= État-major spécialisé pour l'outre-mer et l'étranger =

Insigne.

The Specialized Staff for Overseas and Foreign Affairs (French: État-major spécialisé pour l'outre-mer et l'étranger, EMSOME) was historically dedicated to training the French Army in interculturality and was the maison mere (mother-parent) of the Troupes de marine. It is located at the Ecole militaire in Paris and at Fréjus (the Museum of the Troupes de Marine).

From July 1, 2016, the Overseas and Foreign Specialization Military School was reorganized as the Specialized Overseas and Foreign Staff. While leading the implementation of the land policy overseas and abroad set by the Chief of Staff of the Army is a new role for EMSOME, its historical training missions and local expertise endure.

As of July 1, 2016, the school has evolved into an Overseas Organic Chain Headquarters (OME), under the Commandement des Forces Terrestres (Land Forces Command). EMSOME was transformed but retained its acronym, flag and badge. The staff has organic responsibility for eleven units (9e RIMa, 33e RIMa, 43e BIMa, 6e BIMa, 5e RIAOM, 2e RPIMa, RIMAP-NC, RIMAP-P and 3e REI, DLEM, 5e RC) and guarantees their performance in coordination with the joint commanders and the commands and directorates of the Army. Meeting the needs of the units is also the responsibility of EMSOME. Interface between the regiments, the land forces command (CFT) and the Army staff, the field of action of the staff from 2016 covers the areas of HR and chancellery, logistics, specialized training. EMSOME also contributes to the definition of FT OME policy.

The specialized staff for overseas and foreign countries controls the OME and jungle areas within the Army. During 2018, a command for the operational military partnership of the Army (COM PMO) was created, for which a foreshadowing echelon was inaugurated in October 2017. This structure is backed by EMSOME.

== Units overseas in 1989 ==
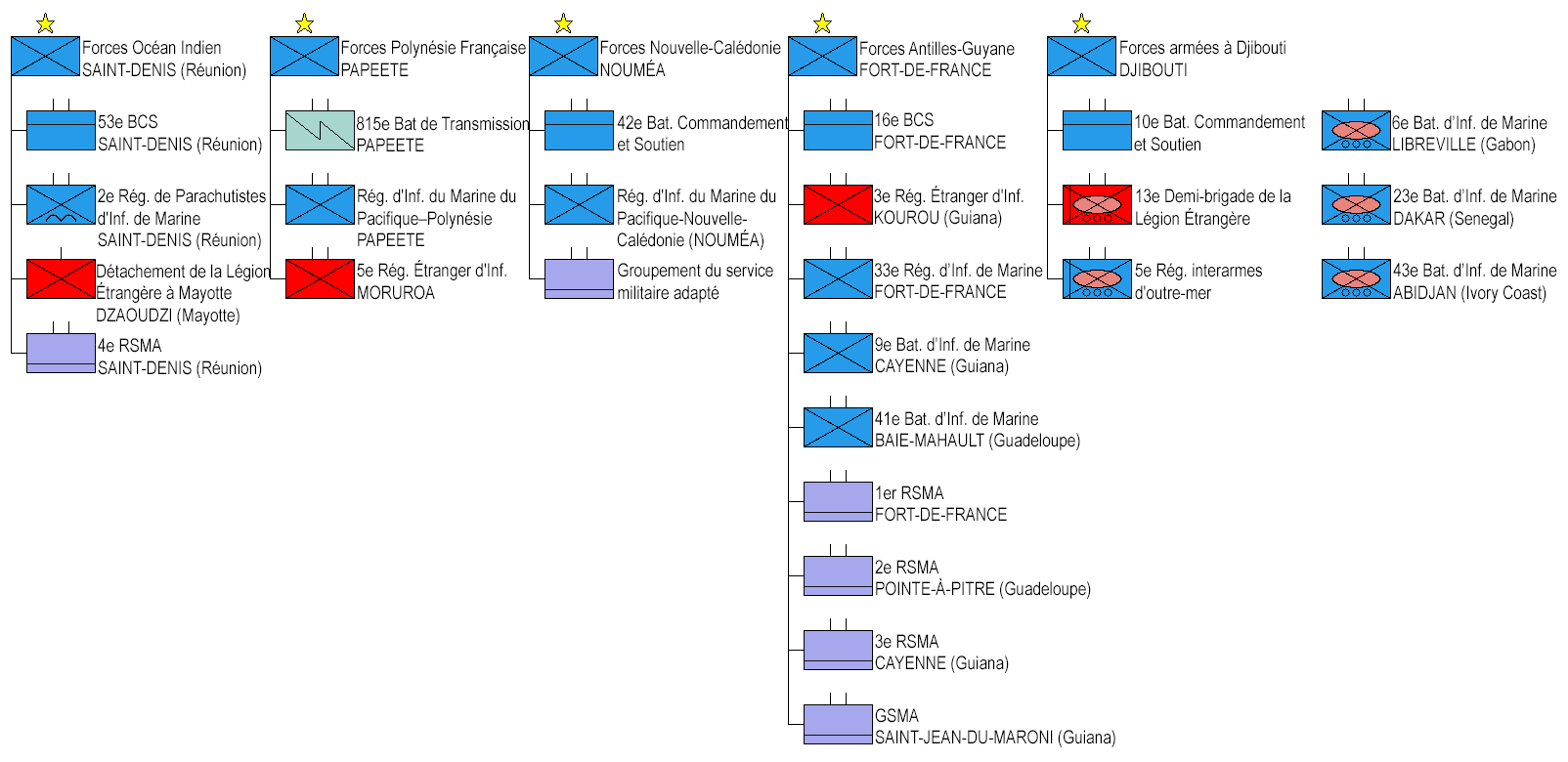
French Overseas Units in 1989 (click to enlarge)

=== Forces armées prépositionnées en Afrique ===
- 6e Bataillon d'Infanterie de Marine (6e BIMa), Libreville (Gabon)
- 23e Bataillon d’Infanterie de Marine (23e BIMa), Dakar (Senegal)
- 43e Bataillon d’Infanterie de Marine (43e BIMa), Port-Bouët, Abidjan (Ivory Coast, formed 1 July 1978)

=== Djibouti ===
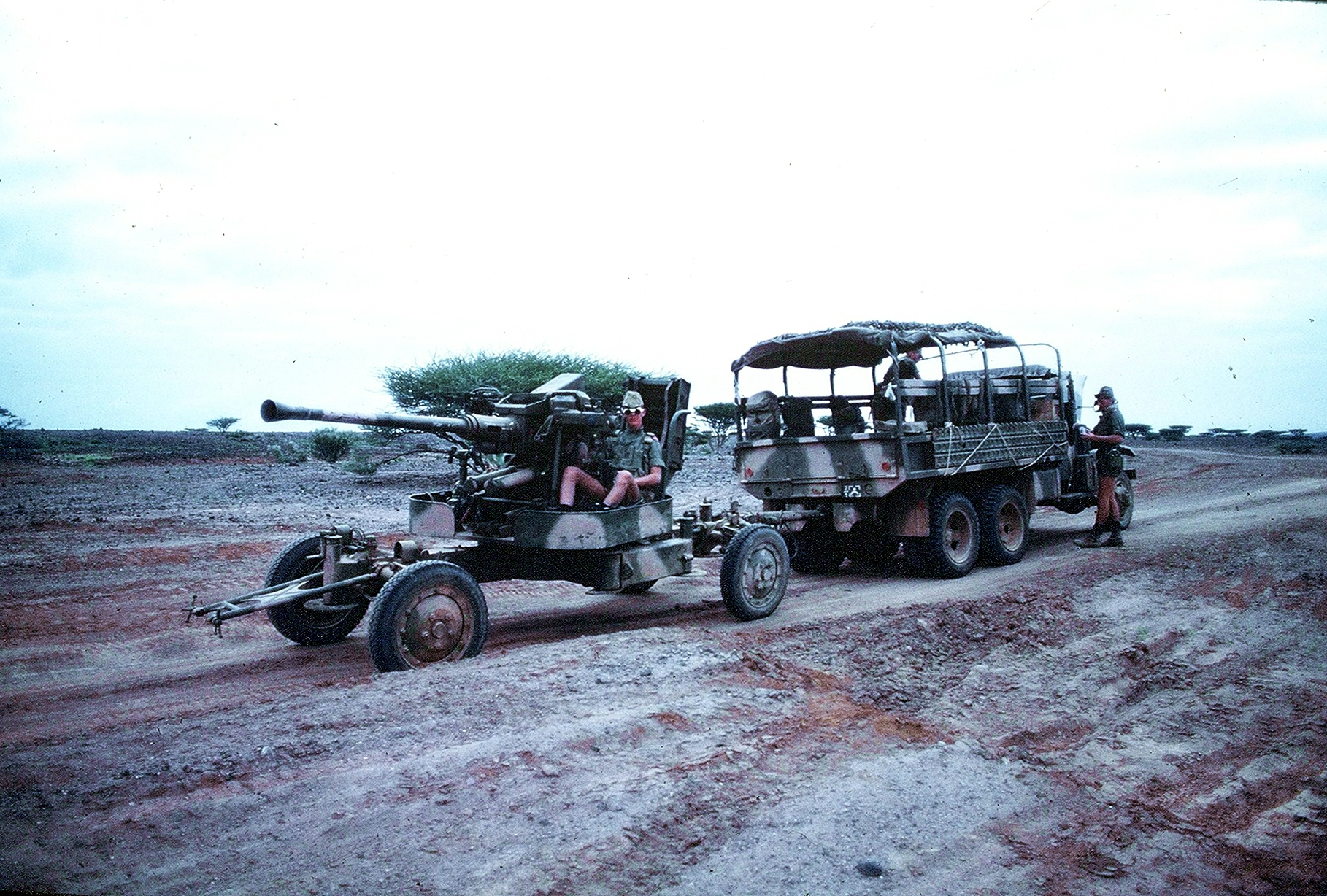
A Bofors 40 mm anti-aircraft gun of the 5th RIAM of Djibouti towed by a GMC CCKW in 1984.

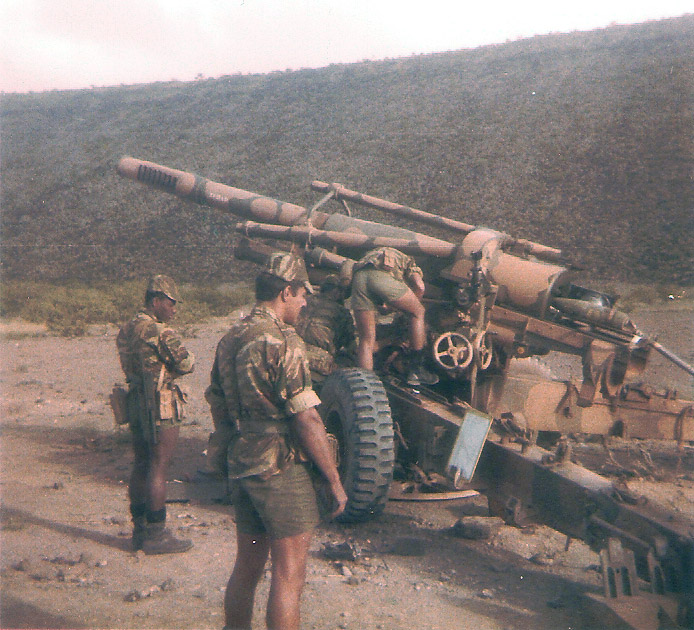
Obusier de 155 mm Modèle 50 in Djibouti in 1979.

Army forces in Djibouti:

- Forces armées stationnées à Djibouti, Djibouti
  - 10^{e} Bataillon de Commandement et de Soutien (10^{e} BCS), Djibouti
  - 5^{e} Régiment interarmes d'outre-mer, Djibouti
  - 13^{e} Demi-brigade de la Légion Étrangère, Djibouti

=== Antilles & Guiana ===
Army forces in the Lesser Antilles and French Guiana:

- Forces armées du groupe Antilles-Guyane, Fort-de-France (Martinique)
  - 16^{e} Bataillon de Commandement et de Soutien (16^{e} BCS), Fort-de-France (Martinique)
  - 3e Régiment Étranger d'Infanterie (3e REI), Kourou (Guiana)
  - 33e Régiment d’Infanterie de Marine (33 RIMa), Fort-de-France (Martinique)
  - 9^{e} Bataillon d’Infanterie de Marine (9^{e} BIMA), Cayenne (Guiana)
  - 41^{e} Bataillon d’Infanterie de Marine (41^{e} BIMa, Baie-Mahault (Guadeloupe)
  - 1^{er} Régiment du service militaire adapté, Fort-de-France (Martinique)
  - 2^{e} Régiment du service militaire adapté, Pointe-à-Pitre (Guadeloupe)
  - 3^{e} Régiment du service militaire adapté, Cayenne (Guiana)
  - Groupement du service militaire adapté Saint-Jean-du-Maroni (Guiana)

=== Indian Ocean ===
Army forces in the Southern Indian Ocean:

- Forces armées de la zone sud de l'Océan Indien, Saint-Denis (Réunion)
  - 53^{e} Bataillon de Commandement et de Soutien (53^{e} BCS), Saint-Denis (Réunion)
  - 2^{e} Régiment Parachutiste d'Infanterie de Marine (2^{e} RPIMa), Saint-Denis (Réunion)
  - Détachement de la Légion Étrangère à Mayotte, Dzaoudzi (Mayotte)
  - 4^{e} Régiment du service militaire adapté, Saint-Denis (Réunion)

=== French Polynesia ===
Army forces in French Polynesia:

- Forces armées en Polynésie Française, Papeete (Tahiti)
  - 5e Régiment Étranger d'Infanterie (5^{e} RE), Moruroa
  - Régiment d'infanterie du Marine du Pacifique–Polynésie, Papeete
  - 815^{e} Bataillon de Transmission (815^{e} BT), Papeete

=== New Caledonia ===
Army forces in New Caledonia:

- Forces armées de la Nouvelle-Calédonie, Nouméa
  - 42^{e} Bataillon de Commandement et de Soutien (42^{e} BCS), Nouméa
  - Régiment d'Infanterie du Marine du Pacifique-Nouvelle-Calédonie, Nouméa
  - Groupement du service militaire adapté, Nouméa

== Composition c. 2018 ==
Unit	Abbreviation	Base
9th Marine Infantry Regiment	9e RIMa	Cayenne
33rd Marine Infantry Regiment	33e RIMa	Guadeloupe, Martinique
43rd Marine Infantry Battalion	43e BIMa	Côte d'Ivoire
6th Marine Infantry Battalion	6e BIMa	Camp de Gaulle, Libreville, Gabon
5e régiment interarmes d'outre-mer	5e RIAOM	Djibouti
2nd Marine Infantry Parachute Regiment	2e RPIMa	La Réunion
Régiment d'infanterie de marine du Pacifique - Nouvelle-Calédonie	RIMAP-NC	Nouvelle-Calédonie
Régiment d'infanterie de marine du Pacifique - Polynésie	RIMAP-P	Polynésie française
3rd Foreign Infantry Regiment	3e REI	Kourou
Détachement de Légion étrangère de Mayotte	DLEM	Mayotte
5th Cuirassier Regiment (5e régiment de cuirassiers)	5e RC	Camp de la Paix, United Arab Emirates
