= 22nd Marine Infantry Regiment =

22nd Marine Infantry Battalion
- 22e Bataillon d'Infanterie de Marine
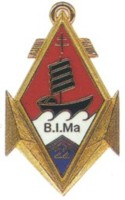
- Regimental badge of the 22nd Marine Infantry Battalion.
- Active: 1 July 1999 - 1 July 2010
- Country: France
- Branch: Troupes de Marine
- Type: Marines
- Part of: 9th Marine Infantry Brigade
- Garrison/HQ: Nantes, France
- Mottos: “Through hope and audacity”
- Colors: Red and blue
- Anniversaries: Bazeilles

The 22nd Marine Infantry Battalion (French: 22e Bataillon d'Infanterie de Marine) is a French marine infantry battalion of the Troupes de Marine of the French Army. It was established on July 1, 1999, and was stationed in Nantes. It operated under the 9th Marine Infantry Brigade. The division incorporates the traditions set by the 22nd Marine Infantry Regiment and the 22nd Colonial Infantry Regiment. Before its dissolution in 2010, the battalion fulfilled support duties.

== History ==
It was created on July 1, 1999, from the 9th Regiment of command and support. On 29 May 2010, a ceremony was to mark the end of a military presence in Nantes. Its official dissolution was scheduled for 1 July 2010. In the reserve response unit (115) to leave Nantes grouped to form the 6th Company of the 6th Engineer Regiment in Angers.

== Subordination ==
The 22nd Battalion Marine Infantry (BIMa) is a support battalion at the headquarters of the Defense Force Headquarters No. 2. The battalion operates under the authority of the land area north-west. It is responsible for operating the PC projected force. The commanding officer took command of all resources deployed.

== After dissolution ==
As of 1 July 2025, the 22nd Marine Infantry Regiment's heritage has been taken up by the 22e GITdM - the Groupement d’Instruction des Troupes de Marine - which continues the traditions of the regiment, albeit as a training/ instructional unit rather than a combat battalion.

== Composition ==
The battalion had 131 soldiers, built around the PC in an administrative, technical and medical headquarters.

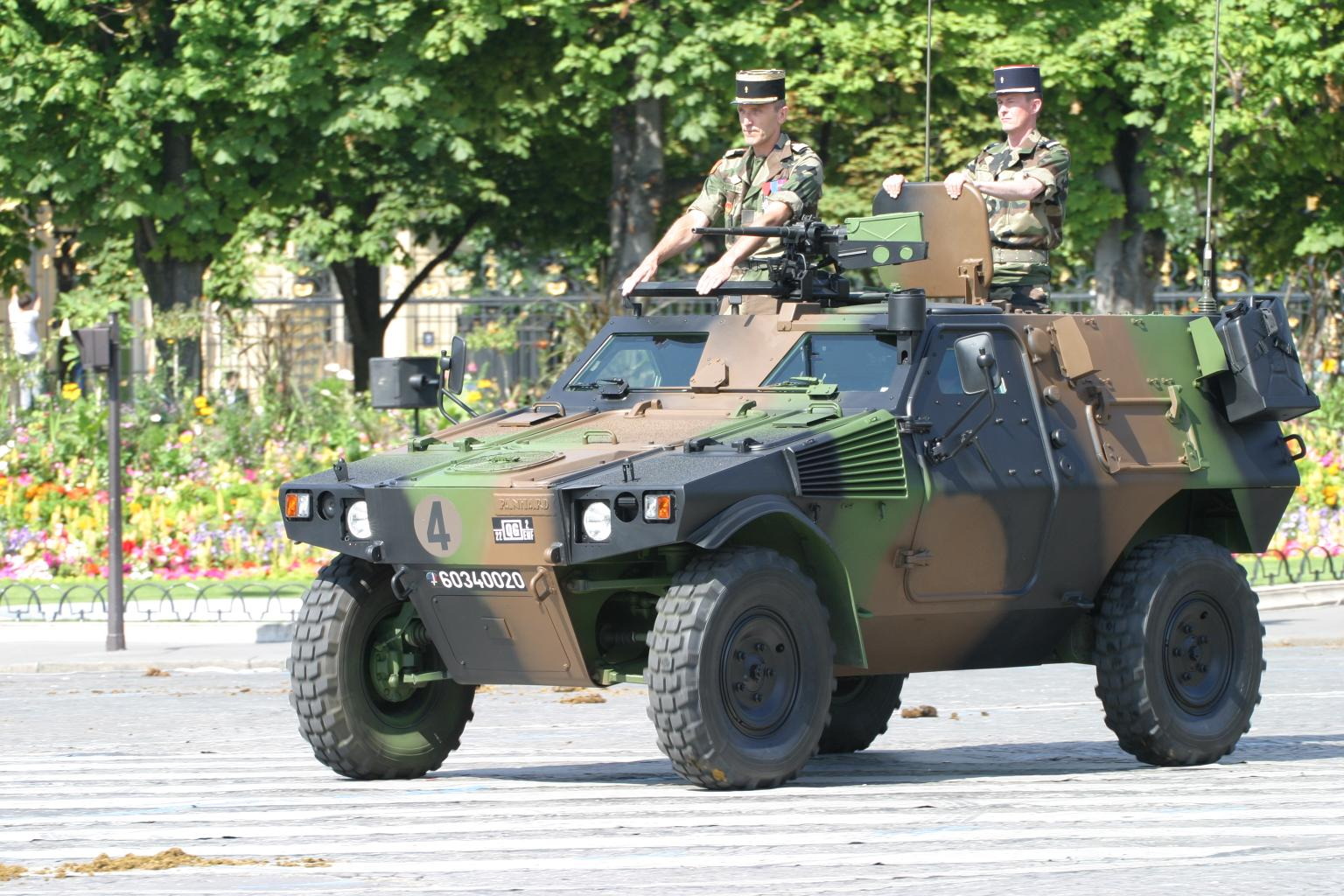
VB2L 003 FR at the same event.

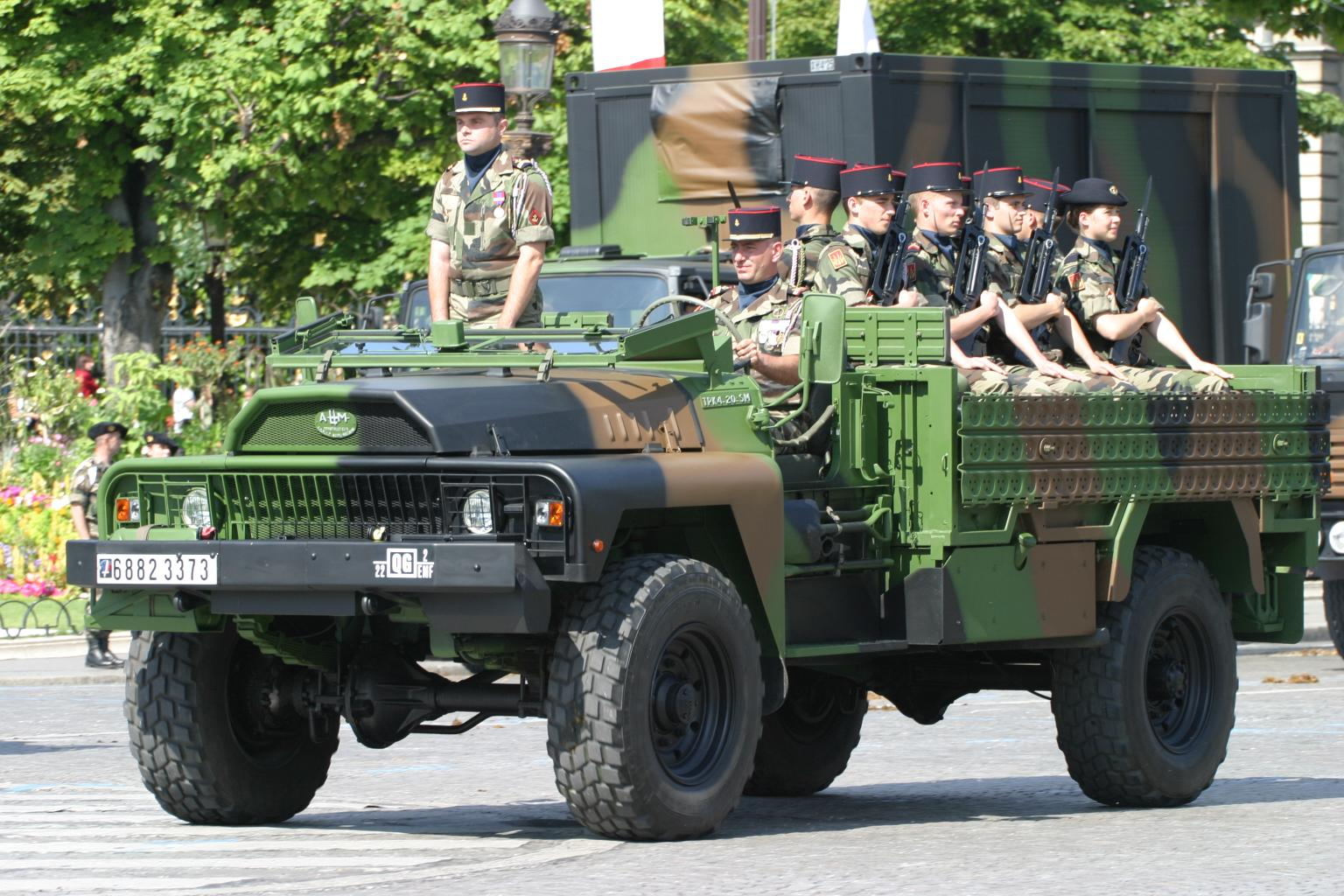
VLRA of the 22nd Marine Infantry Battalion during the military parade on 14 July 2004.

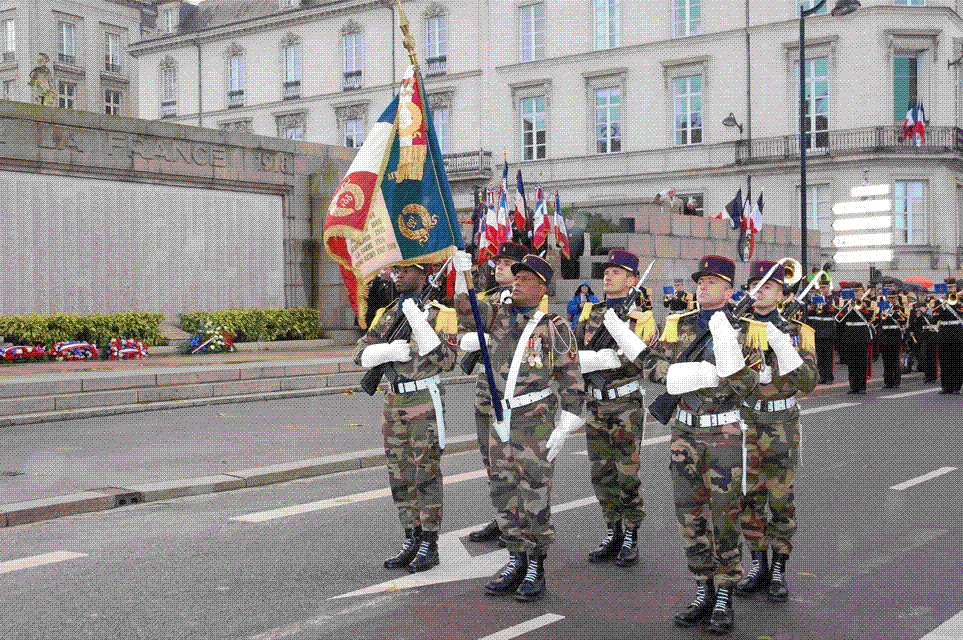
Colour guard
du 22e B.I.Ma
November 11, 2008 in Nantes.

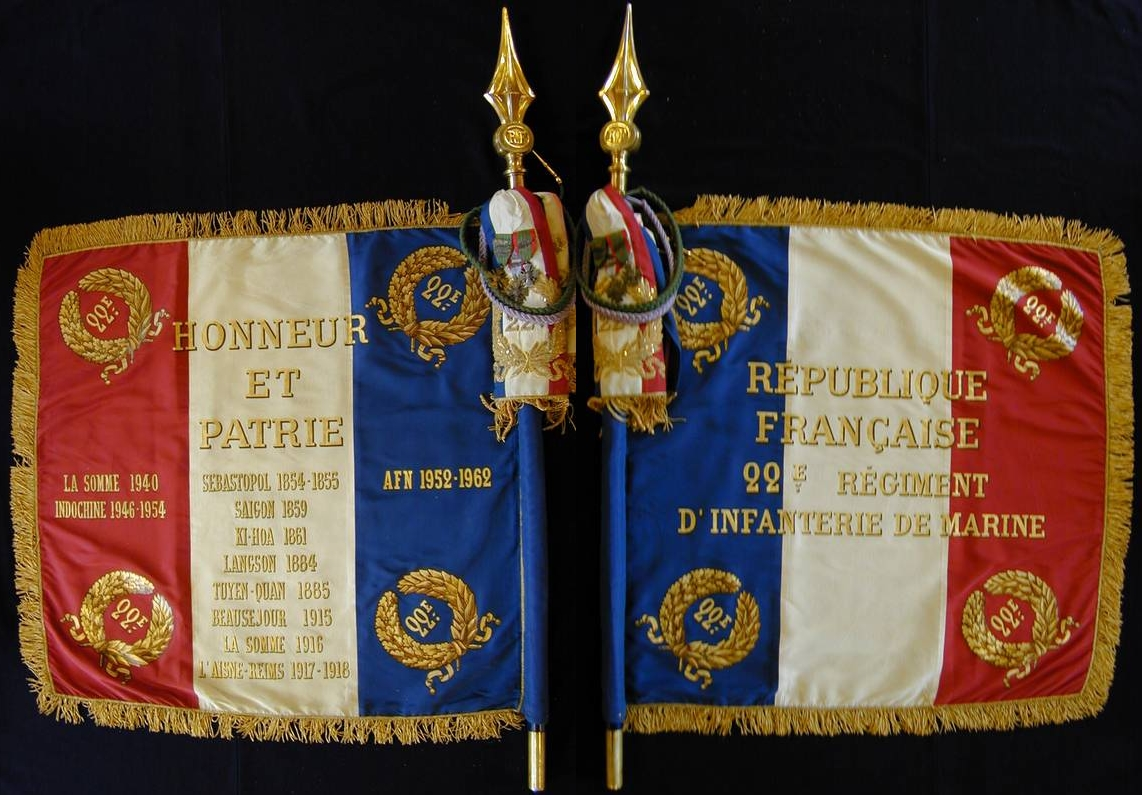

=== Decorations ===
- Its tie is decorated with the Croix de Guerre with three palms and 1914-1918, Croix de Guerre 1939-1945 with one palm, of the Croix de Guerre TOE with 2 palms.
- 3 quotes to order the Army in 1914–1918.
- 1 quote to order the Army in 1939–1945.
- 2 quotes to order the Army in Indochina.

== Sources and bibliography ==
- Erwan Bergot, La colonial du Rif au Tchad 1925-1980, imprimé en France: décembre 1982, n° d'éditeur 7576, n° imprimeur 31129, Sur les presses de l'imprimerie Hérissey.
- Association of Former Battalion of the 22nd battalion Marine Infantry. Speaker: Daniel Thereby, 11 rue Maurice Devillers 80200 Peronne.
