= 6th Marine Infantry Battalion (France) =

Military Unit

The 6th Marine Infantry Battalion is a unit of the Troupes de Marine of the French Army. It is stationed in Libreville, Gabon, subordinate to the general commanding the French elements in Gabon (EFG). It is a mixed battalion, including infantry; armored; engineers; artillery; communications ("transmissions"); and other specialities such as jungle combat and airborne insertion.

It is heir to the traditions of the 6^{e} Regiment d'infanterie coloniale, created on 1 April 1890 by splitting the 2nd Marine Infantry Regiment.

== History ==
At the end of October 1975, the 6eme Regiment Interarmes d'Outre-Mer (6 RIAOM) based in N’Djamena in Chad was repatriated to mainland France and was dissolved in Toulon on 10 November 1975.

Its detachment in Libreville was in turn dissolved on 30 November and became, on 1 December 1975, the 6th Marine Infantry Battalion. On the 12th of that month the battalion received the 6 RIAOM flag from the hands of Colonel Ancelin, the last regimental commander.

When it was created, the 6th BIMa had 426 men including 20 officers, 96 non-commissioned officers and 310 non-commissioned members. At the camp des Gardes, north of Libreville, were support and services command company (CCAS), two reinforcement companies - one motorized including a platoon of armored personnel carriers (COMOTO) and the other parachutist (COMPARA) - a helicopter detachment, an autonomous signals detachment, a provost brigade, a military post office. At that time, the battalion was the only French unit in Gabon. Consequently, the battalion commander was also the commander of the French troops in Gabon (TFG).

In 1975, the transit and supply mission at Douala was attached to the TFG / 6e BIMa.

In 1976, the Gardes camp became the de Gaulle camp and was the subject of major infrastructure works.

The 6th BIMa is a key element of the French system in equatorial Africa. A prepositioned force welcoming metropolitan combat units on short-term missions, the battalion offers education and training opportunities adapted to the Gabonese climate and environment while being ready to intervene without delay in the area.

As part of the reorganization of France's military system in Africa, the French forces in Gabon (FFG, approximately 900 soldiers) were created on 1 September 2007 in place of French troops in Gabon (TFG). A joint staff commanded by a general (COMFOR FFG) is set up at Camp de Gaulle. The latter assumes command of all French units in Gabon, which until that point was exercised by the corps commander of the 6th BIMa.

The 6th Marine Infantry Battalion, stationed in the capital Libreville since 1975, is no more. Since the summer of 2024, the 6th Marine Infantry Battalion has been replaced by a military academy. Camp de Gaulle, which will be renamed a training camp shared and co-managed by France and Gabon. Of the 380 French soldiers in 2023, only about a hundred will remain by July 1, 2025.

It has provided logistics support for most French operations in Africa since it was created: Opération Verveine, where it supported transit through Gabon of French forces heading to Zaire during the Shaba I conflict of March–May 1977; Opération Tacaud (1978); Operation Barracuda, to support newly installed President David Dacko of the Central African Republic (September 1979); Operation Manta (1983); Opération Requin (1990); Opération Epervier for Chad (1992); Opération Addax (1992); Opérations Amaryllis & Operation Turquoise regarding Rwanda (1994); Opération Almandin (1996); Opération Malebo (1996); Opérations Pélican & Antilope (1997); Opérations Malachite (1998) & Okoumé (1999) Operation Licorne in Côte d'Ivoire (2002); Opération Boali (2002)
