= 9th Marine Infantry Regiment =

- 9^{e} Régiment d'infanterie de marine
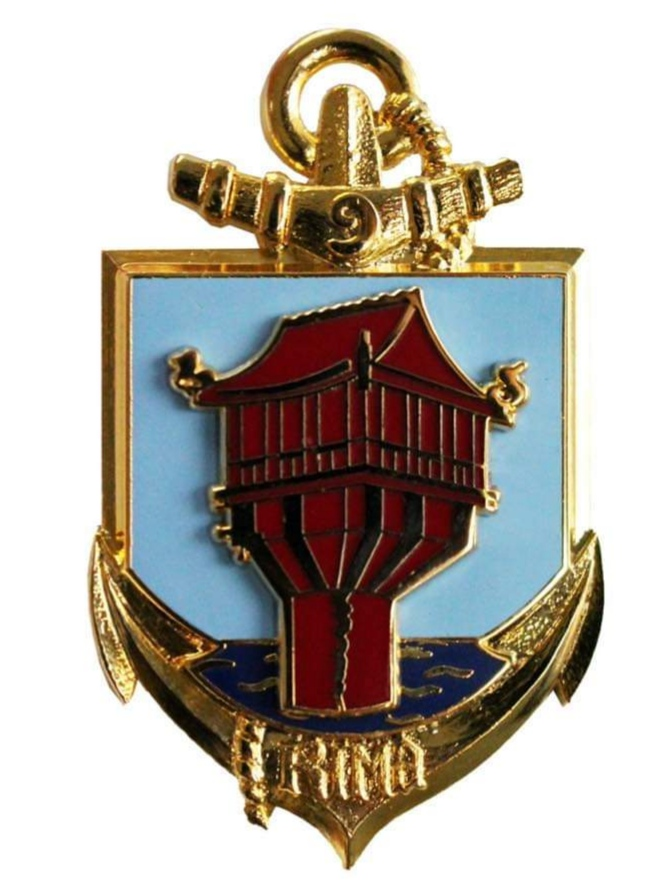
- Regimental insigne
- Active: 1890 - present
- Country: France
- Branch: French Army
- Type: Marine Troops
- Role: Jungle warfare Amphibious warfare Raiding; Counterinsurgency; Reconnaissance; Close-quarters combat
- Part of: Armed Forces in French Guiana
- Garrison/HQ: Cayenne_Saint-Jean-du-Maroni
- Colors: Red and blue
- Anniversaries: Bazeilles

Insignia
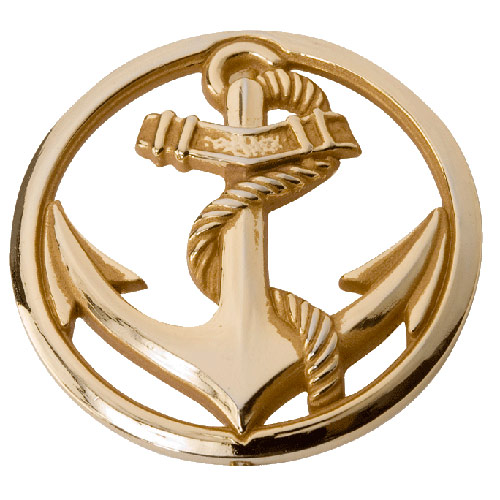
- Beret badge of the Troupes de Marine
- Abbreviation: 9e RIMA

The 9th Marine Infantry Regiment (9e RIMa) is a infantry regiment of the Troupes de marine in the French Army, currently stationed in French Guiana. The troops are situated in the Cayenne district on the River Maroni, in the town of Saint-Jean-du-Maroni, the site of a former penal colony.

== Mission and Organization ==
9e RIMa has a dual mission of infantry and operational support for French forces in Guiana. The regiment recruits from rural Creole, Bush-country Nengue and Amerindian locations in Guiana, as well as in the neighboring countries of Suriname and Brazil. The regiment has a permanent contingent, consisting mainly of marine troops, but also containing forces from all military branches. However 70% of its personnel only sign up for short-term missions. It operates in an equatorial environment, creating great physical strain for its members. Due to its environment, the regiment experts have developed a school to instruct the 1380 short-term mission personnel who serve in its ranks each year, in the tactics specific to the equatorial jungle and river in which it operates.

The infantry has missions along the Maroni and deep into the interior of the country, terminating at the border with Brazil. In the summer of 1999, the infantry was reinforced by a permanent company created specifically for the missions of Operation "Harp". This new company's numbers are estimated to be 670 military personnel.

== Structures ==
The 9e RIMa is composed of several companies stationed in Cayenne, and a detachment based in Saint-Jean-du-Maroni:

- one headquarters company — in the Loubère neighborhood in Cayenne
- one permanent infantry company (created: summer 2010)
- one maintenance company — in the Berthelin Journet district in Cayenne
- one short-mission infantry company
- one short-mission engineering company
- one engineering company
- one reserve company
- one platoon — stationed in Saint-Jean-du-Maroni.

== Battles inscribed on the flag ==
- Creation Date: 1890. Reactivated under its original name in 1992.

It bears the following inscription:

- 9th Marine Infantry Regiment :

- Alma 1854
- Palikao 1860
- Tonkin 1883
- Tombouctou 1890
- Tien-tsin 1900
- Pékin 1900
- Indochine 1939-1945
- AFN 1952-1962
