= 5th Overseas Interarms Regiment =

French Army regiment

- 5^{e} régiment interarmes d’outre-mer
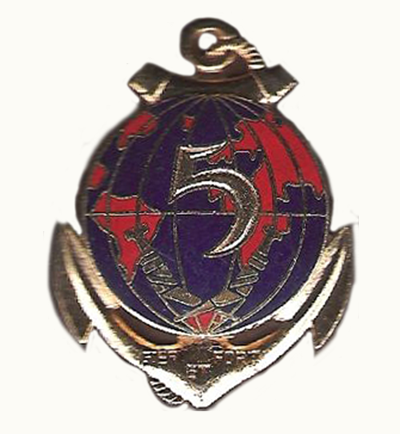
- Regimental insigne
- Active: 1890–present
- Country: France
- Allegiance: France
- Branch: French Army
- Type: Marine Troops
- Role: Desert warfare Amphibious warfare
- Garrison/HQ: Djibouti
- Mottos: "Proud and Strong"
- Colors: Red and blue
- Anniversaries: 1 September (Battle of Bazeilles)

Insignia
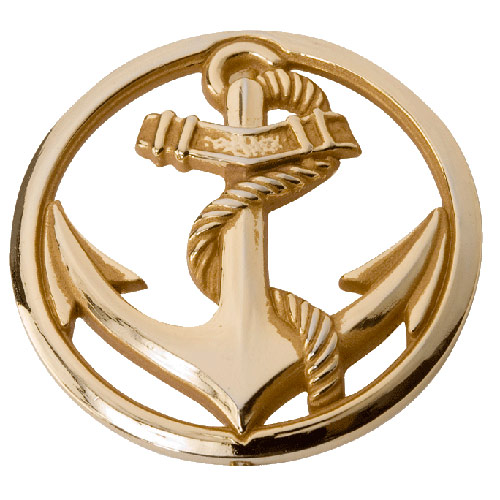
- Beret badge of the Troupes de Marine
- Abbreviation: RIOM

The 5th Overseas Interarms Regiment (French: 5^{e} régiment interarmes d'outre-mer (RIOM)) is a troupes de marine regiment stationed in Djibouti. It has been the Djibouti garrison since 1 November 1969.

It is the last combined arms regiment in the French army comprising a mechanised infantry company, a light cavalry squadron, an artillery battery and a command and support company.

== Recent commanding officers ==
- 1985–1987: Colonel Kelche
- 1987–1989: Colonel Coste
- 1989–1991: Colonel Delort
- 1991–1993: Colonel de Saqui de Sannes
- 1993–1995: Colonel Bidard
- 1995–1997: Colonel Boulnois
- 1997–1999: Colonel Clément-Bollée
- 1999–2001: Colonel de Bourdoncle de Saint Salvy
- 2001–2003: Colonel Boubée de Gramont
- 2003–2005: Colonel Toutous
- 2005–2007: Colonel Bucquet
- 2007–2009: Colonel Millot
- 2009–: Colonel Gauthier

== Organisation ==
Based at Quartier Brière de l'Isle. The Regiment is made up of:

- Headquarters Company (CCS)
- 1st Infantry Company equipped with VAB and missile CA;
- 2nd Battery, an anti-aircraft unit equipped with MISTRAL and NC1;
- 3rd Armoured Squadron, equipped with AMX 10 RC;
- 6th Battery, Artillery unit equipped with 155mm towed cannon Tr-F1 and 120mm mortars.

Since 1 August 2008, the Aviation Battalion Light Djibouti (MNAAvBn) equipped with Puma and Gazelle helicopters has been attached to the 5th RIAOM.

== Decorations ==
- Croix de Guerre 1914–1918 three palms (5e RIC)
- Croix de Guerre 1914–1918 deux palms and a silver star (battalion Somali)
- Croix de guerre 1939–1945 a palm and a silver star (battalion Somali)
- Croix de Guerre TOE of a palm (5e RIC/ Light body for action)
- Two national orders of Laos – Order of the Million Elephants and the White Parasol and Order of the Reign, Bronze class
