= Troupes de marine =

French Army arm

Marine Troops
- Troupes de Marine
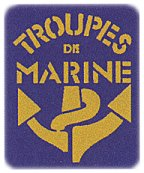
- Marine troops badge
- Active: 1622 – present (402 years)
- Country: France
- Branch: French Army
- Type: Marines
- Role: Amphibious warfare Expeditionary warfare Airborne forces Special Operations Capable
- Size: > 17,000 men (2022)
- Nicknames: Les marsouins (The porpoises); Les bigors (The winkles)
- Mottos: Et au Nom de Dieu, vive la coloniale! ("And in the name of God, long live the Coloniale!")
- Colors: Red and blue
- March: Hymne de l'Infanterie de marine
- Anniversaries: Bazeilles (31 August - 1 September)
- Engagements: Siege of La Rochelle (1627-1628); Franco-Spanish War; Franco-Dutch War; Nine Years' War; War of the Spanish Succession; War of the Polish Succession; King George's War; Seven Years' War; French and Indian War; American Revolutionary War; French Revolutionary Wars; Napoleonic Wars; First Franco-Mexican War; Franco-Moroccan War; Crimean War; Second Opium War; Cochinchina Campaign; Second Franco-Mexican War; Franco-Prussian War; Sino-French war; Tonkin campaign; Second Madagascar expedition; Boxer Rebellion; First World War; Second World War; Indochina War; Suez Crisis; Algerian War; Lebanese Civil War (1975-1990); United Nations Interim Force in Lebanon (1978–present); Multinational Force in Lebanon (1982-1984); Gulf War; Bosnian War; Kosovo War; War on terror; War in Afghanistan (2001-2021); First Ivorian Civil War; Second Ivorian Civil War; Mali War; Operation Serval (2013-2014); Operation Barkhane (2014-2022); Central African Republic Civil War; Operation Sangaris (2013-2016)

Commanders
- Current commander: Père de l'Arme ("Father of the Marine Corps"); General Paul Gèze
- Notable commanders: Général Joseph Gallieni; Général Marcel Bigeard; Jacques Testard de Montigny

Insignia
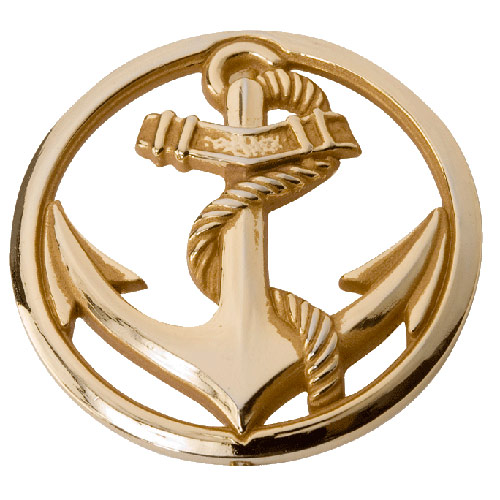
- Beret badge of the Troupes de Marine
- Abbreviation: TDM

The Troupes de Marine (French pronunciation: [tʁup də maʁin], lit. 'Marine Troops') or TDM, sometimes simply referred to as "French Marines" in English, are one of the major components of the French Army and comprise several specialties: infantry, airborne, armoured cavalry, artillery, engineering, and transmissions (signals). Characterized by their fundamental vocation for service beyond the seas, including in French overseas territories and, formerly, in French colonies, the Marines have taken part in all French military campaigns since the corps' foundation, both on home soil and in theaters of operations around the world. They are stationed in Metropolitan France, in many French overseas departments and territories, as well as in Africa.

Historically amphibious warfare specialists, the French Marines were pioneers of professionalization since the late 1960s and are well suited for military campaigns abroad. From Gabon in 1964 to Afghanistan in 2002, and from the First Gulf War in 1990 to Mali in 2013, their units took part in more than sixty military operations over six decades. As they represent a core asset of French expeditionary capabilities, they are highly trained soldiers and noted for their professionalism and strong esprit de corps. With a strength of over 17,000 men as of 2022, the Troupes de Marine consist of 26 regiments and amount to around 15% of the French Army.

== History ==
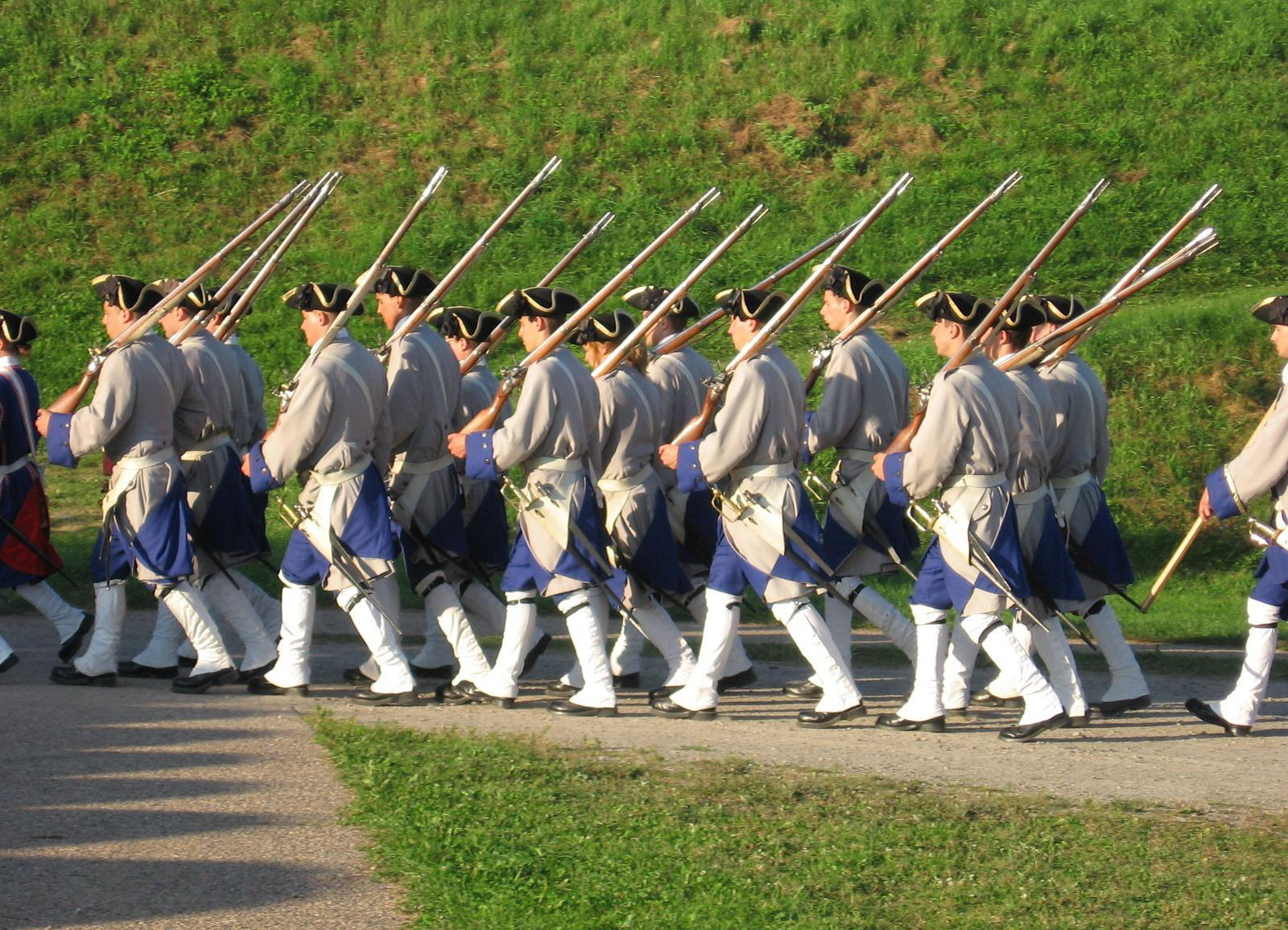
Reenactors depicting the compagnies franches de la marine as they were dressed during the Seven Years' War in 2008

The Troupes de marine were formerly known as the Troupes coloniales, with origins dating back to the French Navy's Troupes de la marine. The French colonies were under the control of the Ministère de la Marine (the equivalent of the British Admiralty), accordingly, Marines defended the colonies.

=== Ancien Régime ===
==== Origin ====
Renamed Troupes d'Outre-Mer then Troupes de Marine during the dismantling of the French Union (1958), their origin can actually be found in the Compagnies Ordinaires de la Mer (French: Compagnies Ordinaires de la Mer) (Ordinary Sea Companies), created in 1622 by Cardinal Richelieu. These companies were used to embark on royal naval ships to serve the naval artillery and participate in the boarding of enemy ships. These companies were also in charge of guarding the various sea ports. Despite the fact that the artillery of the marines was limited in numbers compared to those of the infantry marines (fusiliers and grenadiers), the ship's marine artillerymen were the determining factor for the Troupes de la marine, being in charge of displacing and mounting the naval guns under the orders of the respective marine artillery officer in charge. In the 18th century, they constituted the Compagnies Franches de la Marine who essentially spread to Nouvelle France (in particular: these marines were recruited in Europe, with marine officers recruiting them on the spot due to an excellent knowledge of the local environment). Since then the anchor has been with the Troupes as their official symbol because of the former links to the French Royal Navy.

Following France's defeat in the Seven Years' War, these troops, along with the rest of the Marines, were transferred to the French Army under the Choiseul ministries, and after their emancipation at the end of 1760, they retained a large number of officers issued from the Ministère de la Guerre, which would reproduce and compensate for the losses endured assisting the colonies during the American Revolutionary War. An evolution in the mentality of the troops and an increasingly pronounced separation between the marines and their officers followed. A tentative close-up merger was attempted by two naval ship corps and their troops in 1786 with the companies of naval gunners assigned to ships of the Navy; however, the experiment came to little conclusion.

==== Ordinary Sea Companies and Troupes de la marine (1622–1673) ====
The separate companies of the Régiment Royal–La Marine and the Régiment de l'Amiral de France founded by Colbert were based in Dunkerque, Le Havre, Brest, Rochefort and Toulon. They wore an off-white/grey uniform with blue facings.

The 1670s saw significant changes in the organisation of the new corps, administered by Ministers Colbert and François-Michel le Tellier, Marquis de Louvois, respectively Naval State Secretary and the Secretary of State of War. The four regiments of the la marine were transferred from the secretariat of La Marine to that of the secretariat of La Guerre. The regiments were no longer directly part of the French Navy although the designation Troupes de marine was retained. During the Revolution, the La Marine, Royal-Marine, Royal-Vaisseux, and the Régiment de l'Amiral (re-baptized Régiment de Vermandois) regiments were integrated definitively into the French Army, becoming respectively, the 11^{e}, 60^{e}, 43^{e} and 61^{e} regiments of de Ligne in 1791.

The Marine Royale was a substantial force in 1671, consisting of 196 naval vessels. Colbert decided to create 100 companies of "guardian-soldiers" intended to form part of the crews of the larger naval vessels (French: Vaisseau). However, these men were redirected towards the French Army by Louvois in 1673. Starting from this date, senior naval and marine officers were obliged to separately recruit crews and marines for each ship. Using a system of «levées» (selective conscription) in the various sea ports, similar to the « marine press », the naval and marine officers were able to man their ships. However, the system reached its limitations quickly. The recruits often lacked discipline and experience, and were discharged or deserted following their first voyage, wasting months of training. Until 1682 there was a serious shortage of experienced sailors and soldiers in the French Navy.

==== Free Marine Companies and Marine Artillery Corps (1690–1761) ====
The Marine units were recreated at the end of the 17th century by re-organization of the infantry units dedicated to guarding military harbors (the Warden-Soldiers Companies or compagnies de soldats-gardiens, created in 1671) and the artillery units dedicated to coastal battery service (Bomb Companies or compagnies de bombardiers, created in 1689), naval artillery training (Apprentice Gunner Companies or compagnies d'apprentis-cannoniers, created in 1689) and naval artillery administration (Artillery Commissaries or Commissaires d'artillerie, created in 1631).

- Compagnies franches de la Marine (Free Marine Companies) created in 1690. Each company was tasked to guard a military harbor and its immediate coastline. Beginning in 1695, the Companies were organized in battalions around the major harbors (Brest, Rochefort, Toulon). The Marine Companies and Battalions were dissolved in 1761.
- Corps d'artillerie de Marine (Marine Artillery Corps), created in 1692 to oversee the training and use of coastal artillery. The Corps was disbanded in 1761.

==== Royal Marine Corps (1769–1786) ====
The infantry and marine artillery units were briefly merged into a single marine corps in 1769. Some colonial units were created at the same time, organized along the same lines of artillery and infantry units.

- Corps royal d'artillerie et d'infanterie de Marine (Royal Marine Artillery and Infantry Corps), created in 1769. Its name was changed in 1772 to Corps royal de la Marine (Royal Marine Corps). The Corps was organized in eight regiments, each centered on a harbor: (Bayonne, Bordeaux, Brest, Le Havre, Marseille, Rochefort, Saint-Malo and Toulon). The corps was broken down in 1774, in line with Antoine de Sartine's reform of the navy.
- Corps royal d'infanterie de la marine ("Royal Marine Infantry Corps), created in 1774 with the infantry units of the Royal Marine Corps, organized in three divisions centered on the only three military harbors remaining: Brest, Rochefort and Toulon. The Corps' name was changed to Corps royal de la Marine in 1782, but it remained an infantry-only unit. The corps was disbanded in 1786.
- Artillerie de Marine (Marine Artillery), created in 1774 with the artillery units of the Royal Marine Corps, organized in three divisions centered on the same three military harbors: Brest, Rochefort and Toulon. The Marine Artillerymen were tasked to serve aboard Navy ships as well as manning the coastal batteries. The commanding officers of the Marine Artillery were naval officers. The corps was dispanded in 1786.
- Colonial Regiments
  - "Cap", created 1766, became the 106th Infantry Regiment
  - "Pondichéry", set up 1772, became the 107th Infantry Regiment
  - "Martinique et Guadeloupe", created 1772, became the 109th Infantry Regiment
  - "Port-au-Prince", created 1773, became 110th Infantry Regiment

=== Revolution and First French Empire (1786–1816) ===
After 1786, the Marine units were often reduced to artillery units, except for some short-lived infantry regiments (1792–1794).

- Corps royal de cannoniers-matelots (Royal Sailors-Gunners Corps), created on 1 January 1786. The Corps royal de canonniers-matelots was an early attempt to use sailors for duties previously done by marines – soldiers specializing in naval and amphibious combat. This naval artillery corps was suppressed in 1792 and its duties transferred to a new marine unit.
- Corps d'artillerie et d'infanterie de marine (Marine Artillery and Infantry Corps), created in 1792. The Corps had four infantry regiments, two artillery regiments, two engineer companies and two training companies. The infantry units were transferred to the Army in 1794.
- Corps d'artillerie de marine (Marine Artillery Corps), created in 1794 from the artillery units of the Artillery and Infantry Corps. It was organized in seven half-brigades and re-organized in four regiments in 1803. The Corps gained the title Impérial at Napoléon I's coronation (1804) and Royal at Louis XVIII's return (1814 and 1815).

These units fought for France during the French Revolutionary Wars and in all the Napoleonic Wars.

=== 19th century ===
The colonial expansion of the 19th century saw the extensive use of French sailors and marines serving together in Southeast Asia, the Pacific, and West Africa. The troupes de marine were tasked with insuring the French presence in its Asian, African, and American colonies.

The revolutionary period saw a definite division in 1792 between the reconstituted troupes de marine and the ships of the navy. Under Napoleon, the troupes de marine were used primarily as line infantry. Following the disbandment of the Imperial Guard, under the Restoration, separate marine artillery (Artillerie de Marine) and marine infantry (Infanterie de Marine) units were created as part of a reorganization between 1818 and 1822. These two corps were popularly known as « bigors » and « marsouins » respectively. Starting in 1831, these two arms ceased to serve on board naval ships and were exclusively armed with regular army equipment and weapons. Their role was now to serve on land in the new French colonial territories, as well as defending the large naval ports and bases in France itself.

The diverse colonial or exterior operations administered by the July Monarchy, essentially conducted by the Marines and their troops, led to the rehabilitation and the increase of the latter in 1846. The revolution of 1848 led to a draconian reduction in size. The Crimean War saw them, along with the equipment of naval vessels of the fleet, illustrating their capability during the Siege of Sevastopol while aiding the heavy artillery pieces (to constitute a siege artillery) to disembark from the naval vessels under the orders of Admiral Charles Rigault de Genouilly.

Honored since 1855, with the return of their staff of 1846, the marines demonstrated their capability during the expeditions of the Second French Empire.

In 1870, marine artillery and infantry were for the first time regrouped in a grand unit: Blue Division of general Élie de Vassoigne, named after the blue uniforms worn by the soldiers to differentiate them from the line troops. Following the Franco-Prussian War, the marines participated to the construction of the second colonial empire of France.

==== Marine Infantry and Marine Artillery Regiments (1816–1900) ====
The 21 February 1816, royal ordinance of Louis XVIII re-establishing L'infanterie de marine authorized two regiments. This was increased to three regiments in 1838 and four in 1854. The 1st Regiment was located in Cherbourg, the 2nd in Brest, the 3rd in Rochefort and the 4th in Toulon. In 1890, L'infanterie de marine was increased to eight regiments. L'artillerie de marine, created in 1793, was formed into a single regiment in 1814. A second was added on 8 July 1893. Battles fought in this era included Bomarsund (1854) in the Baltic, Sea of Azoff and the Crimea (1855–56), Ki Hoa in China (1860), and the Battle of Puebla in Mexico (1863). Their most famous battle was Bazeilles (1870) in the Franco-Prussian War.

The Troupes de marine fought in the Sino-French War (August 1884 to April 1885) and during the period of undeclared hostilities in Tonkin (northern Vietnam) that preceded it. Between June 1883 and April 1886 the Tonkin Expeditionary Corps included several marine infantry battalions and marine artillery batteries. These units saw service in the Sơn Tây Campaign (December 1883), the Bắc Ninh Campaign (March 1884), the Capture of Hưng Hóa (April 1884), the Bắc Lệ ambush (June 1884), the Keelung Campaign (October 1884 to June 1885), the Battle of Yu Oc (November 1884), the Battle of Núi Bop (January 1885), the Lạng Sơn Campaign (February 1885) and the Pescadores Campaign (March 1885). In March 1885 the two marine infantry battalions in Lieutenant-Colonel Ange-Laurent Giovanninelli's 1st Brigade suffered heavy casualties storming the Chinese trenches at the Battle of Hòa Mộc. The French victory at Hòa Mộc relieved the Siege of Tuyên Quang, and was commemorated thereafter in an annual ceremony at Tuyên Quang in which a soldier of the French Foreign Legion (representing the besieged garrison) and a marine infantryman (representing the relief column) solemnly presented arms on the anniversary of the relief of the beleaguered French post.

The French Navy itself, due to the trouble it was having in obtaining naval infantry detachments from the Ministry of the Navy, established the Fusiliers Marins in 1856. The Fusiliers-Marins were initially composed of sailors, senior rates and naval officers who undertook special infantry training to form the "marine" detachments aboard ships and conduct small scale landings. Unlike their anglophone contemporaries, they are graded by naval rates rather than adopting army ranks.

=== Transformation to Troupes Coloniales ===
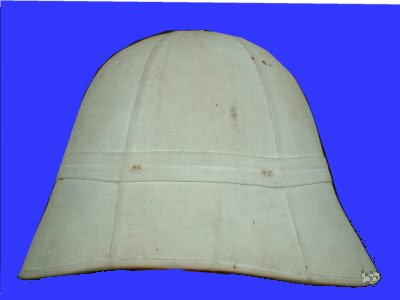
Helmet of Colonial Troupes.

In 1890 the Ministry of Colonies was separated from that of the Ministère de la Marine. This raised the question of to which authority the troupes de Marine, who only now served in the colonies, should be responsible. By a decree dated 7 July 1900 the renamed troops were placed under the Département de la Guerre and were thus rebadged, now as part of the French Army, under one name – the Troupes coloniales, retaining the anchor badge as a reminder of their naval heritage.

The Troupes coloniales were composed of two distinct corps. One was the colonial forces in metropolitan France, composed of Europeans who had voluntarily enlisted for successive service engagements of five years duration. These regulars (as opposed to conscripts) were assigned in small contingents to undertake tours of duty in the various French colonies outside North Africa. There they served either in blanches (all white) units, or were employed as officers and NCOs in the recruitment, training and leadership of locally recruited indigenous troops (tirailleurs, cipayes etc.). The proportion of European to "native" colonial troops were progressively reduced as additional locally recruited units were created during the late 19th and earlier 20th centuries.

One problem of this system was the differences between the training and equipment required for colonial and European warfare. Service conditions in turn would differ between the various colonial territories in Africa and South East Asia. The two types of colonial troupes were however successfully employed in World War I and World War II, as well as the Indochina War and the Algerian War.

The Construction Service of the marine artillery (which designed and engineered the naval artillery guns in the metropolitan arsenals), became an integral part of the colonial artillery following the reorganisation of 1900. In 1909 those colonial artillery officers who specialised in artillery design and manufacture work were transferred into the newly created "Engineers of Naval Artillery"; a newly created corps of the French Navy which subsequently merged with the Naval Engineer Corps (responsible for the construction of naval ships) during the Second World War.

In 1905, the strength of the Troupes coloniales stationed in (the 19 military districts of metropolitan) France was marked at 2,123 officers and 26,581 other ranks. The strength maintained in the colonies amounts to 1,743 officers, 21,516 European troops and 47,868 native soldiers.

==== Troupes Coloniales (1900–1958) ====
By the time the Troupes were transferred to the Army the unit names changed from "Marine" to "Colonial" while the Fusiliers-Marins remained part of the French Navy. The Troupes Coloniale were still used in occasional amphibious landings but this was because of the ready availability of units normally based near naval embarkation ports or in colonial garrisons. In the World War I Gallipoli campaign in the Dardanelles, the Corps expéditionnaire d'Orient was more than two-thirds Troupes Coloniale including the 4th, 6th, 7th and 8th Colonial Infantry Regiments and Colonial Artillery. (The artillery element at Gallipoli did not contain any artillery units from the Troupes Coloniales.) The Troupes Coloniales were however far more likely to see action in African or Asian land campaigns or, during both World Wars, in France itself.

In World War II, one Colonial unit did have "Marine" in its title – The Bataillon d'Infanterie de Marine du Pacifique (BIMP). Two divisions of the Troupes Coloniale were trained in amphibious tactics by the Americans and performed amphibious landings at Corsica (6th Moroccan Mountain Division) and Elba (9th Colonial Infantry Division – 9e DIC). Both these divisions also landed in southern France in the follow-on echelons of Operation Dragoon. The French wanted the United States to transport these two divisions to the Pacific to fight against the Japanese and later retake French Indochina, but transport was a problem.

The Troupes coloniales distinguished themselves in both World Wars. The most decorated regimental colors of the French Armed Forces are those of the Colonial Infantry Regiment of Morocco (RICM) and the regimental colors of the 2nd Marine Infantry Regiment 2^{e} RIMa. After 1945 the decolonization wars involved the colonial troops in Indochina, Algeria, and Madagascar. Following 1962, operations in Africa were undertaken by the again renamed troupes de Marine and the Légion étrangère which were the only units mainly or entirely composed of "engaged" (non-conscript) soldiers. This was also the case in Tchad and in Lebanon and the former Yugoslavia before metropolitan troops started also to recruit volunteer soldiers. The cessation of obligatory military service after 2001 permitted the deployment of the remainder of the French Army in overseas operations.

=== End of Troupes Coloniales and recreation of Troupes de Marine ===
==== Troupes de Marine (1958– present) ====
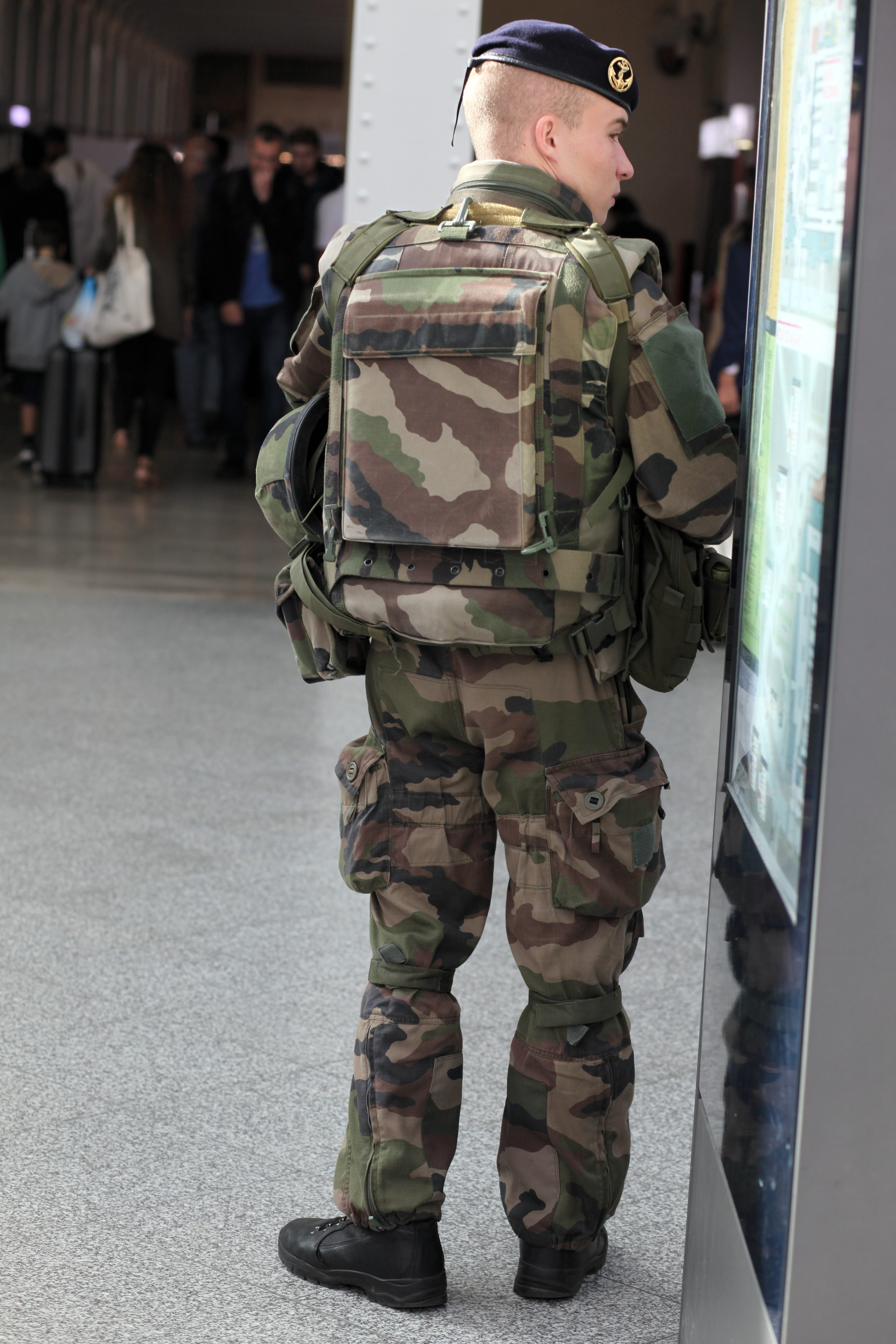
A "marsouin" standing guard at the Gare de Lyon in 2016.

With France divesting itself of its colonies, on 1 December 1958 the title of Troupes d' Outre-Mer (Overseas Troops) replaced that of Troupes Coloniales. Finally, on 4 May 1961, the historic designation of "Troupes de marine" was readopted, this time for all the Troupes Coloniales. They became a major component in France's Forces d'Intervention. In July 1963 the 9th Marine Infantry Brigade (9^{e} Brigade d'Infanterie de Marine) (9^{e} BIMa) of the Troupes de marine was formed a French Force d'Intervention. It was named after and carried the insignia of the 9th Colonial Infantry Division (9^{e} DIC) that had performed a successful amphibious assault on Elba in World War II. The Troupes de marine remaining overseas became part of the Forces d'outre mer. In 1964 the Force d'Intervention was expanded by adding two airborne brigades and one motorized brigade and formed into the 11th Division d'Intervention, which became the 11th Parachute Division in 1971. The Troupes de marine were removed from this division in 1976 to form a separate intervention force, and the 9^{e} Brigade d'Infanterie de Marine was expanded on 1 January 1976 to form the 9^{e} Division d'Infanterie de Marine (9e DIMa). This division was the amphibious component of the Force d'Intervention, which was renamed the Force d'Action Rapide (FAR) in 1983.

Because of their overseas heritage and their use in the Force d'Intervention, the Troupes de marine were mostly volunteer regulars, as in France, draftees are legally exempt from overseas duty. The conversion of the French Army into a smaller professional force led to the French Army's decision to make the brigade its largest formation and the 9^{e} Division d'Infanterie de Marine was reduced in size on 1 July 1999 and became the 9th Light Armoured Marine Brigade (France) (9^{e} Brigade Légère Blindée de Marine) and then back to the 9th Marine Infantry Brigade (9ème Brigade d'Infanterie de Marine) in 2016.

The Troupes de marine are one of the "armes" (corps) of the French Army, which includes specialties associated with other corps (artillery, cavalry, signals, armour, paratroopers) but with overseas deployment as a specialisation.

=== Gallery ===
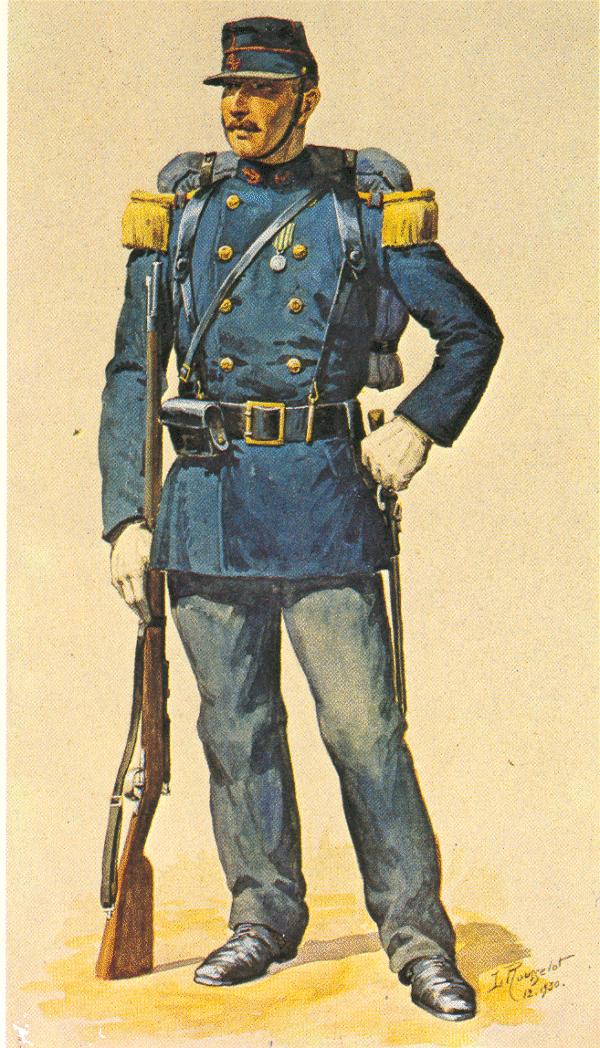
Marsouin in full metropolitan dress, as worn until 1914.

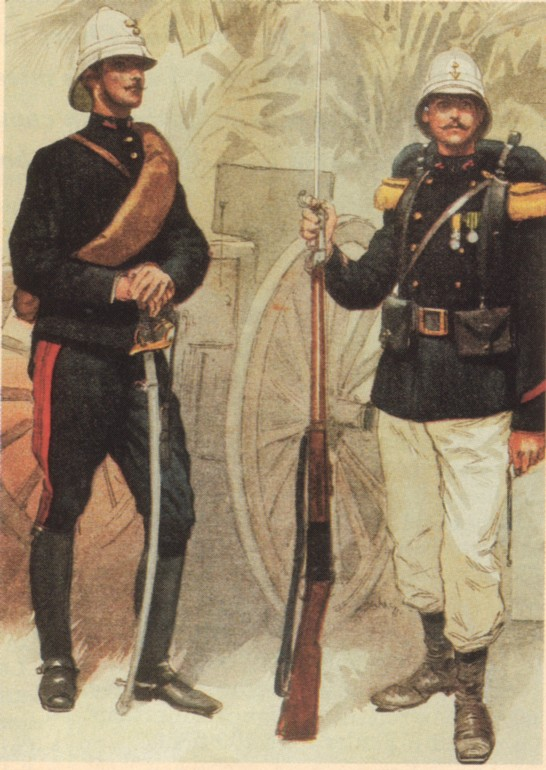
Officer and Marsouin (private) in colonial dress, late 19th century.

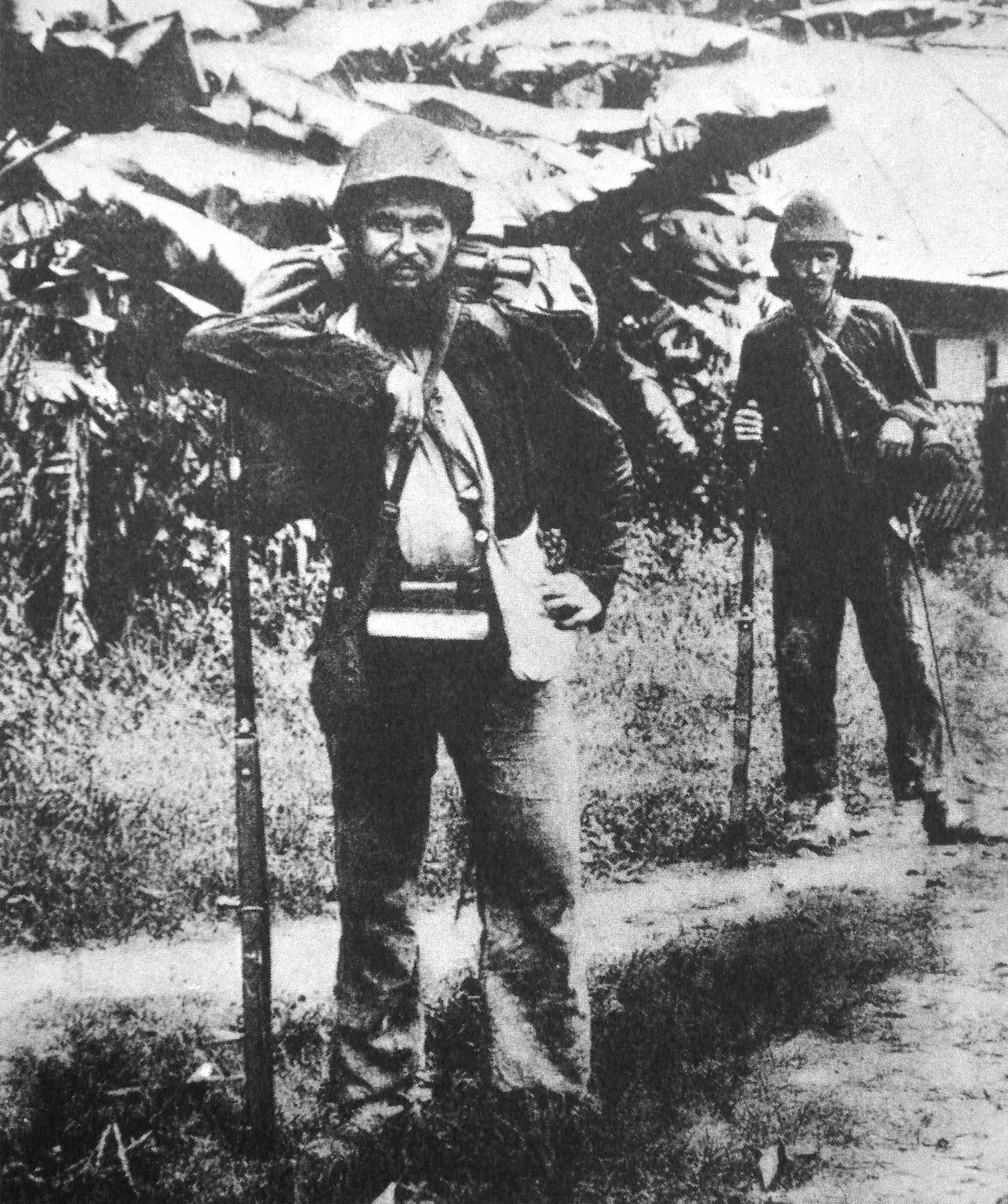
Marine infantrymen in Tonkin, 1888.

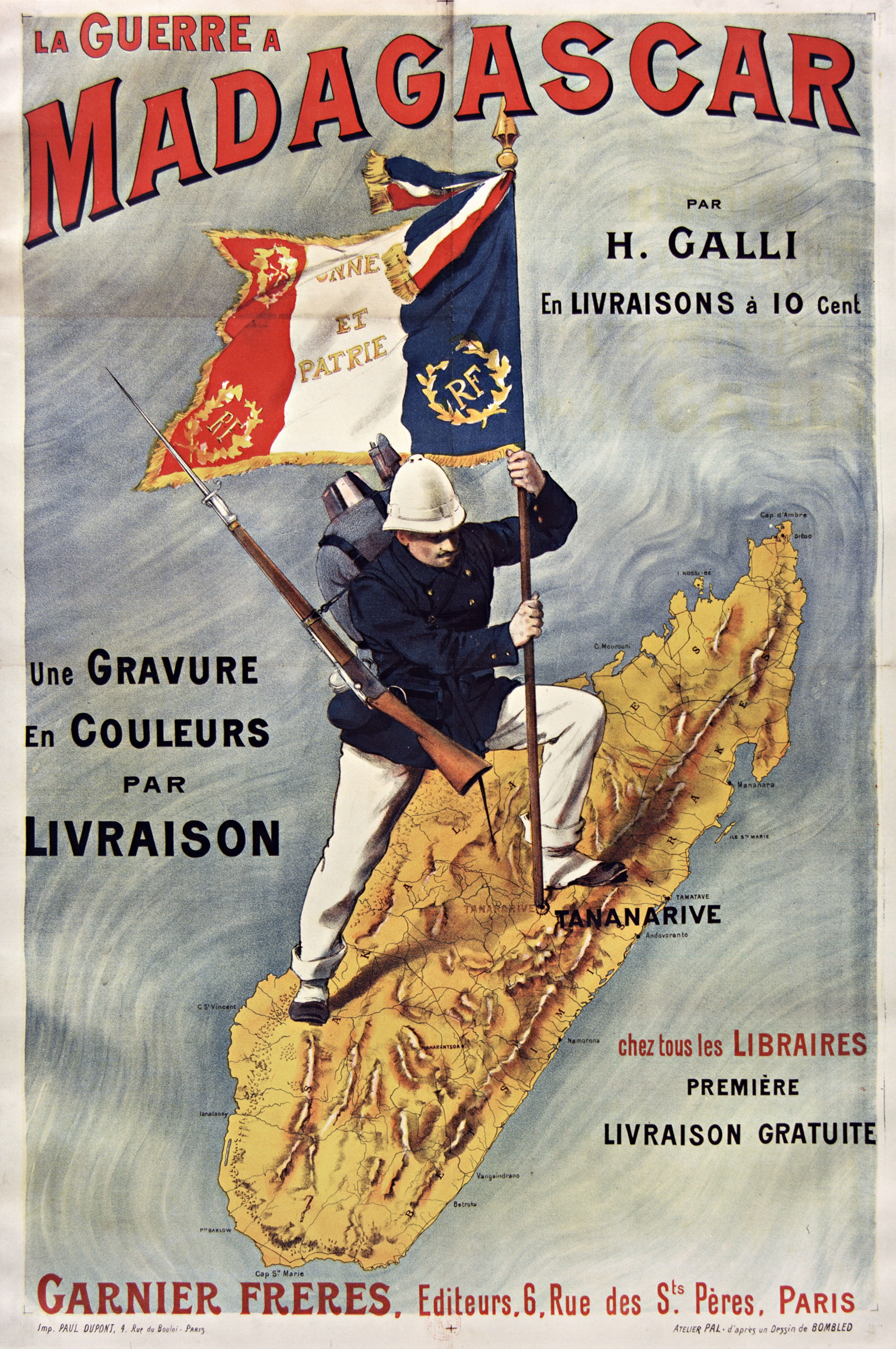
French Marines in Madagascar (1894–1895).

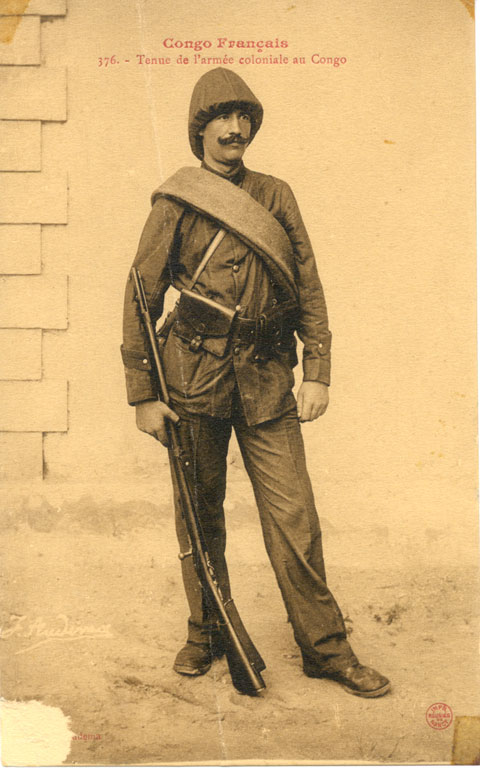
French colonial soldier in Congo (1905)

== Nicknames ==
The Marine soldiers are known in French as marsouins ("Harbour porpoise"), allegedly because, like porpoises, they accompany ships without really being part of the crew.

Marine Gunners are known as bigors, a nickname whose origin is disputed. It could come from bigue dehors which was the order given for loading the guns on a ship. It could also come from bigorneau (winkle in English), either due to their toughness and unwillingness to desert their positions in combat or because their duties usually had them stuck on coastal rocks.

The nickname used by Marsouins and Bigors for the other branches of the French Army is biffins (slang for ragmen). The name originated in the nineteenth century when sailors of the Fleet and Marine Infantry and Artillerymen, proud of their own smart appearance, accused the soldiers of the Army of being slovenly by comparison. The Legion is excused this nickname, probably reflecting a special relation between Marsouins and legionnaires.

== Uniform ==
The modern Troupes de marine uniform is the same as for other units of the French Army (light beige, plain green or woodland or desert camouflage according to circumstances). Distinctive features are a gold metal fouled anchor badge on a dark blue beret (Marine paratroopers wear red berets and their badge is a composite of the gold metal anchor and the silver wing of airborne units). This is worn either on the beret or embroidered on the front of the kepi.

The modern full dress includes a dark blue kepi, yellow fringed epaulettes (official colour name is daffodil) and a navy blue cravat (scarf worn around the neck). A red waist sash is also sometimes worn by certain units with a history of colonial service in Africa and Indo-China.

Historically, the uniform consisted of a blue kepi with red piping, double breasted navy blue tunic, lighter blue trousers, and yellow epaulettes. Worn by all ranks until 1914, the blue uniform was reissued for regular personnel in 1930 and is still worn by bandsmen. This traditional uniform gave the nickname of "the Blue Division" to the Troupes de marine units involved in the 1870 Franco-Prussian War. The pith helmet was worn overseas during the colonial period, with blue, khaki or white uniforms according to circumstances. Until the early 1960s a dark blue calot (forage/side cap) with red piping and anchor badge was the usual distinction of the Troupes de marine.

=== Gallery ===
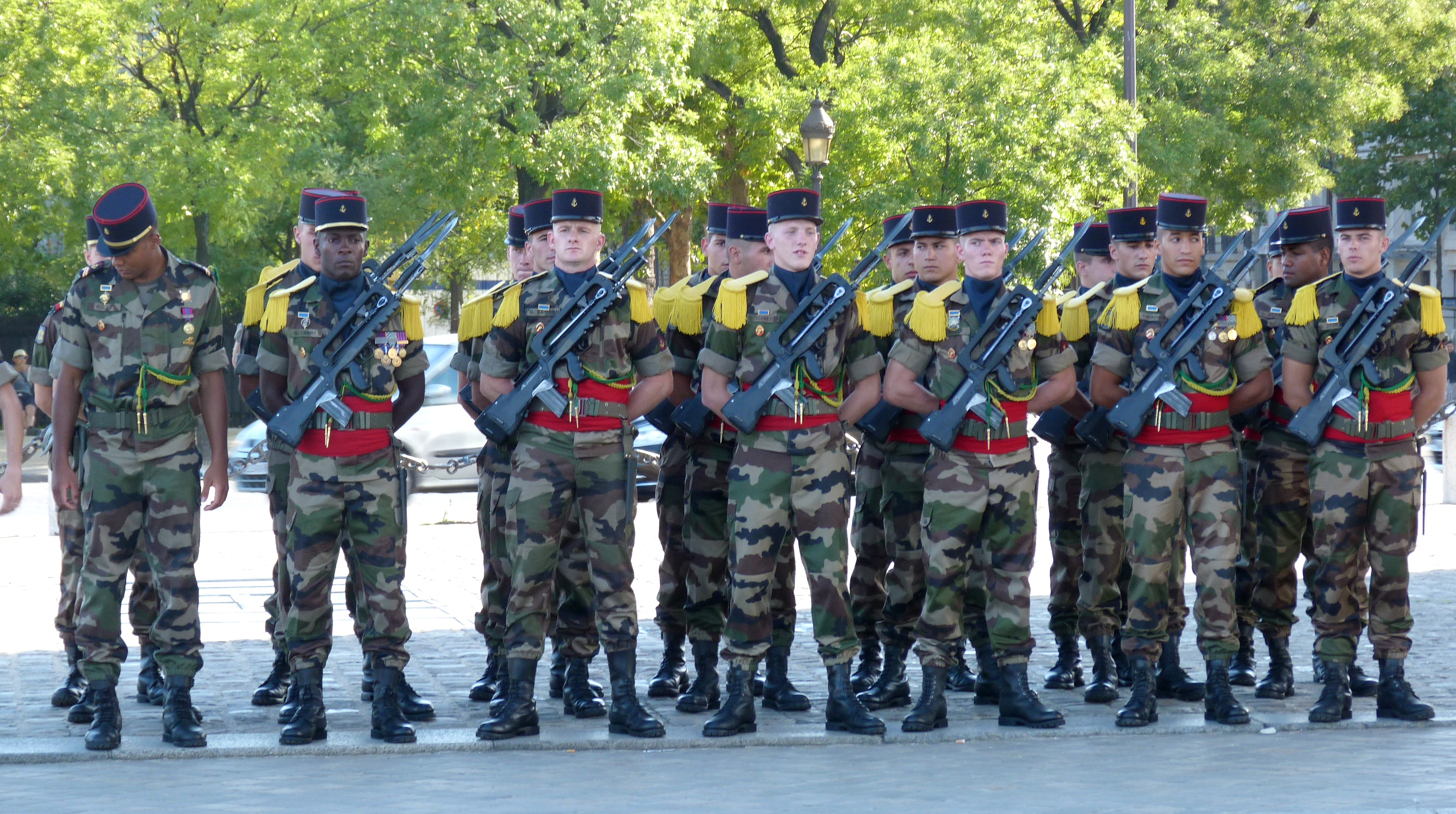
Troupes de marine on parade

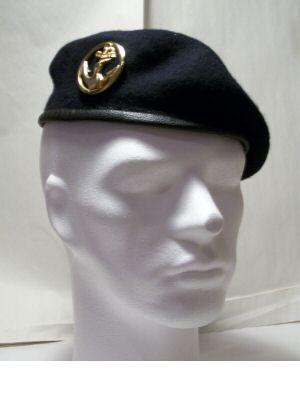
Beret of all the French Army's Troupes de marine, except paratroopers.

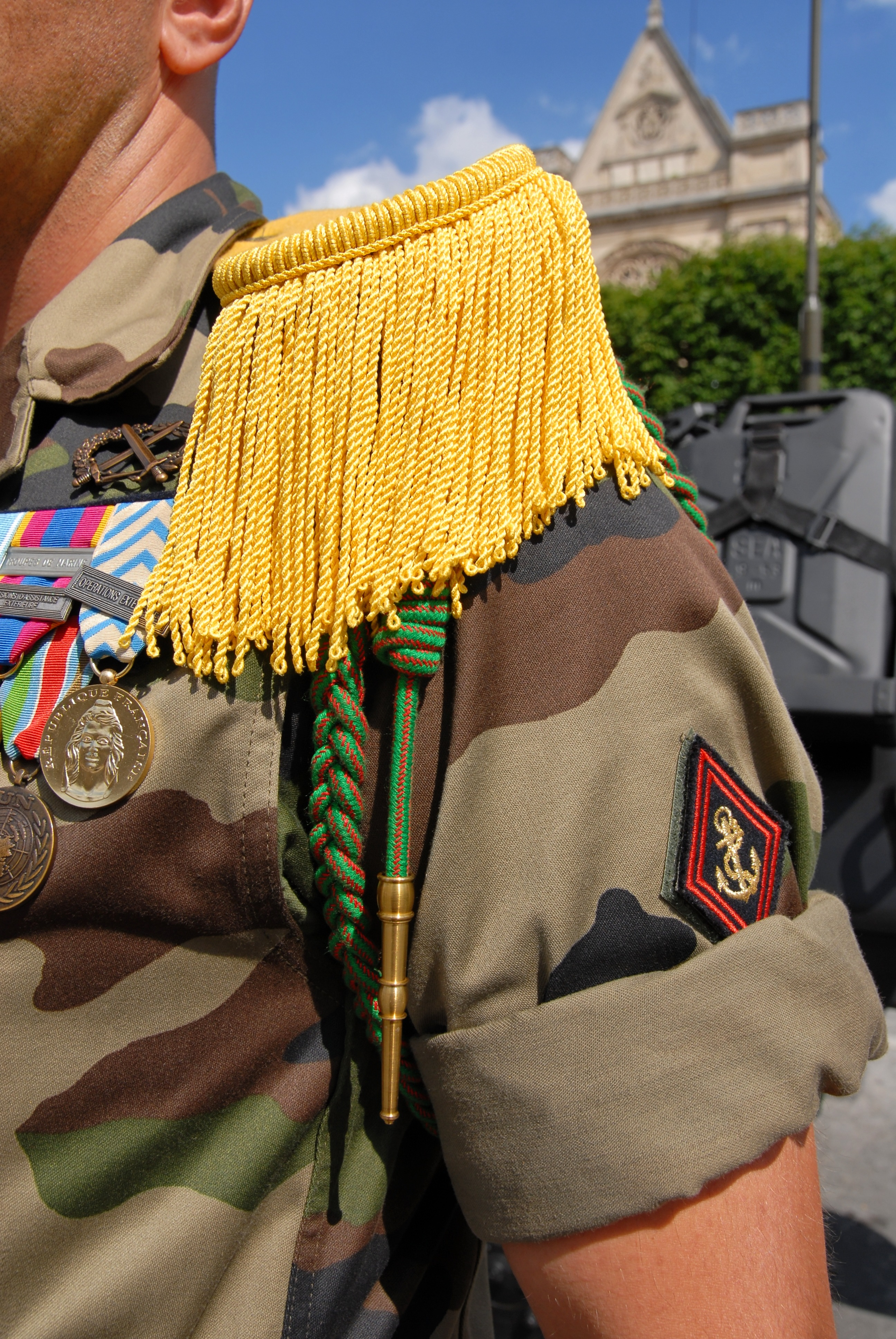
The distinctive badge with an anchor and the yellow epaulettes of the Troupes de marine. This uniform is only used for parades.

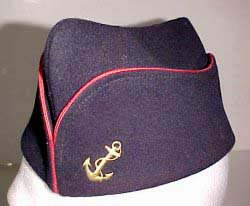
"Traditional" garrison cap (calot)

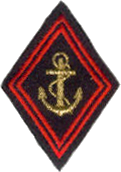
Shoulder Patch of all marines (and infantry, paratroopers and light cavalry before the 2000s).

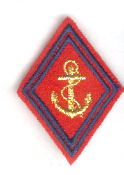
Shoulder patch of the marine artillery before the 2000s. This patch is sometimes still worn but not official anymore.

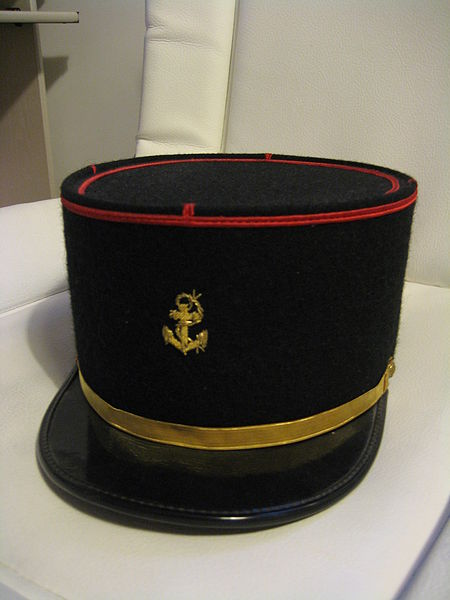
Képi of a first sergeant in the TDM with gold piping

=== Kepi and traditional epaulettes ===
The modern kepi is presented to new recruits in a solemn ceremony. It is worn by officers and non-commissioned officers when another headdress is not prescribed. The kepi is entirely dark blue – a very dark blue, often mistaken for black – with a red (privates and corporals) or gold (non-commissioned officers and officers) trimming. All kepis display the anchor insignia of the Marines. When not being worn the kepi is expected to be positioned so that the anchor is always visible.

The "traditional" epaulettes used by the TdM are gold for officers and NCOs and wool of "daffodil" yellow for other ranks. This colour and pattern is derived from the historic epaulettes of the light infantry formations in mainland France.

=== Golden Spurs ===
The officers of marine "mounted" units (that is to say those formerly using horses, or currently armored vehicles) have the privilege of wearing gold spurs for certain occasions. This differs from the usual French cavalry practice of wearing silver spurs. Tradition has it that Queen Victoria of the United Kingdom requested this distinction for the marine troops from Emperor Napoleon III to honor the branch after the Battle of Balaclava in the Crimea (1854) where marine infantry saved British troops from destruction.

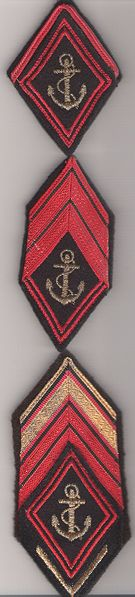
Badges and rank of Corporal and Corporal Chief of Marine troops

=== Sword ===
The officers and senior non-commissioned-officer can wear, in special circumstances, a sword as a part of their dress uniform. This sword has a straight-edge blade, in contrast to other Army Corps' curved sabers and thus similar to those of the Royal Marines and the rest of the British Armed Forces. Since the Second World War, the sword is very rarely used.

=== Red beret ===
The armored, artillery and infantry regiments of the Marines wear dark blue berets with golden anchor insignia. The parachute regiments of the Marines (2^{e} RPIMa, 3^{e} RPIMa, 8^{e} RPIMa) wear a red beret with anchor and wing insignia, the 1^{e} RPIMa SAS, a Special Forces regiment, where soldiers wear a purple beret.

The red beret was first introduced to the Free French Paratroopers of the SAS in August 1944, at the 2^{e} RCP during a parade on 11 November 1944, this regiment for a first time dressed this beret with the insignia of the SAS. However, these paratroopers then belonged to the Air Force. In Indochina, the Infantry Metropolitan SAS Demi-Brigade retained the practice, which was readopted by the 1st SAS Parachute Demi-Brigade in 1948. The red beret, which was officially introduced as the standard uniform headdress on all Paratroopers in Indochina in 1952 by Général Jean de Lattre de Tassigny (except for the Legion), became the norm for all airborne contingents of the French Army in 1957, with legionnaires paratroopers retaining their traditional green beret, and the 1^{e} RPIMa which transitioned to a purple beret in 2015.

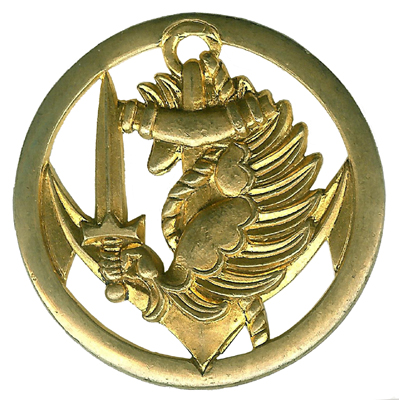
Beret badge worn by the paratroops of the French colonial troops.(Obsolete)

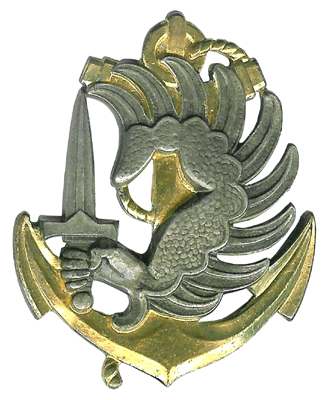
Current Beret badge worn by the Marine paratroops

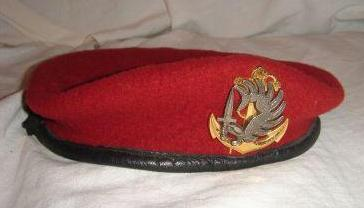
red beret (Amaranth) of marine paratroops (France).

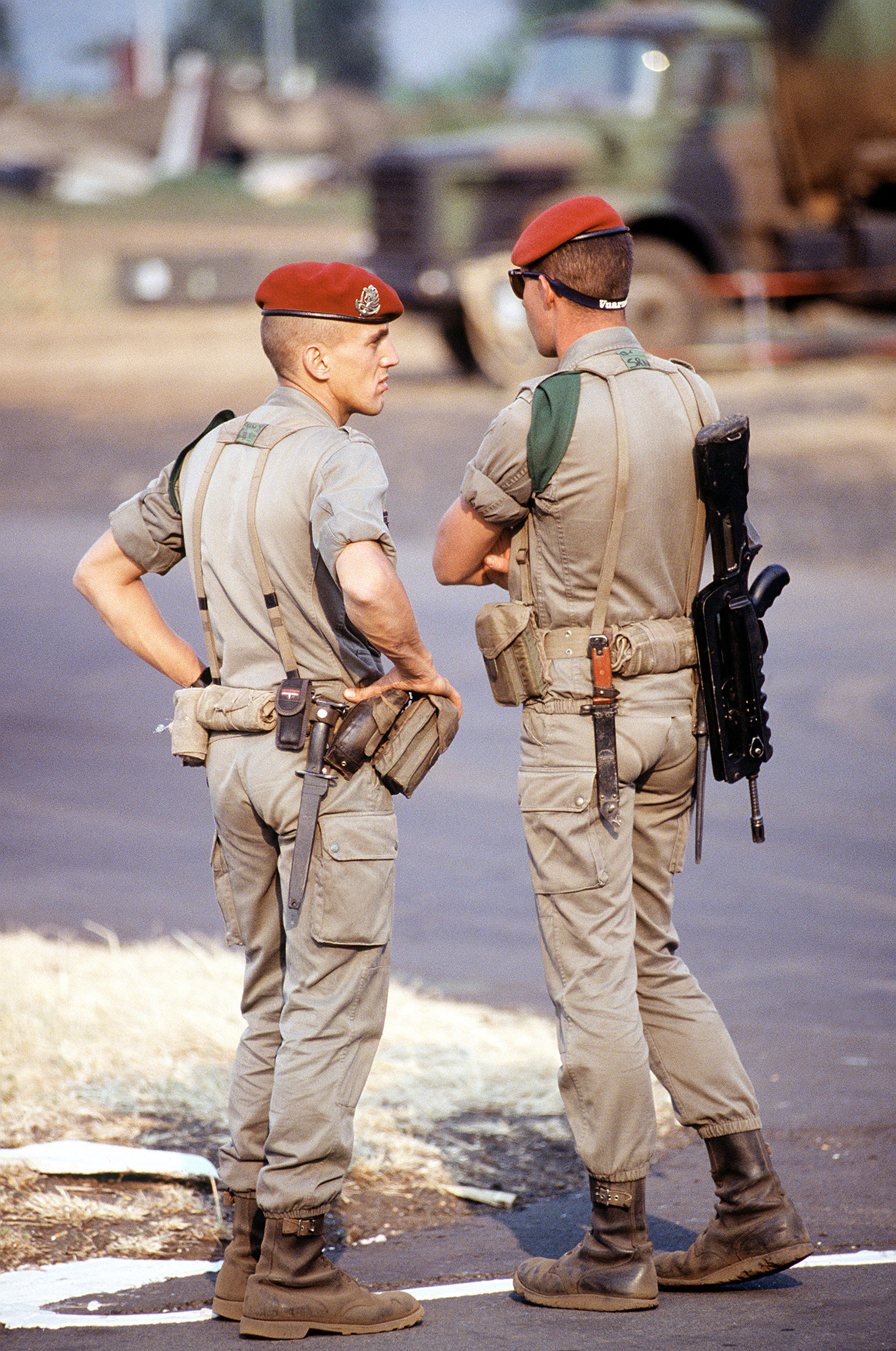
Marine parachutists in Rwanda.

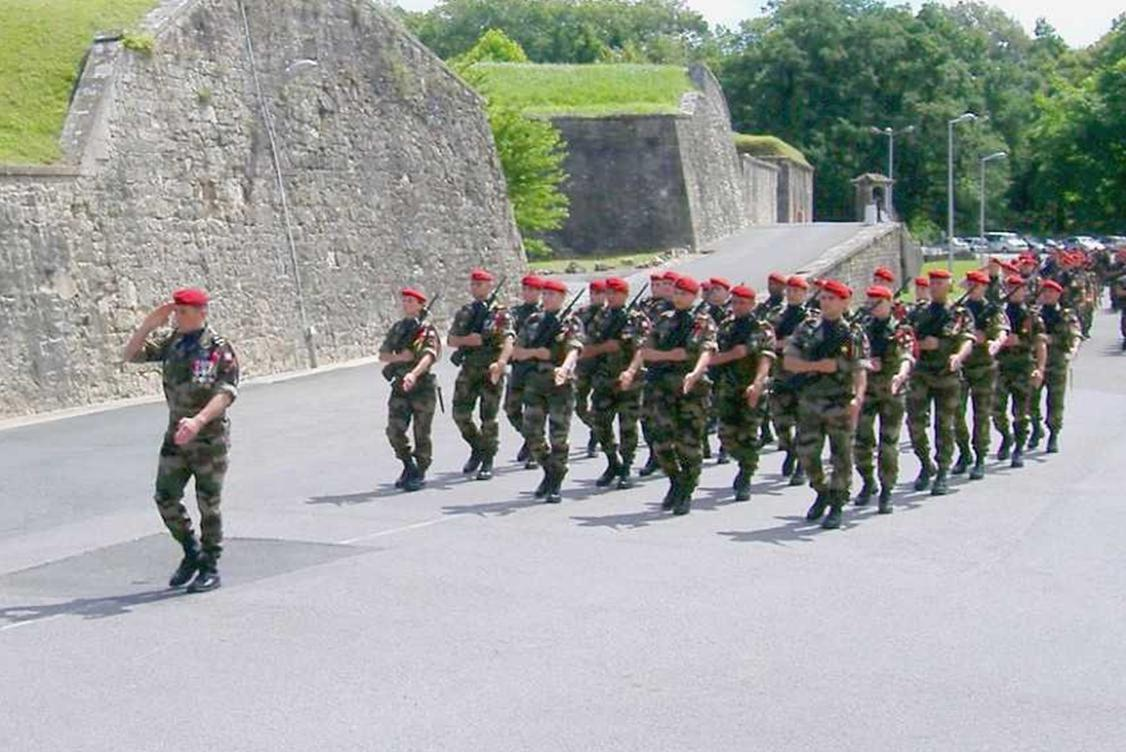
The companies of the 1st Parachute Regiment of Marine Infantry, in 2008 in Bayonne.

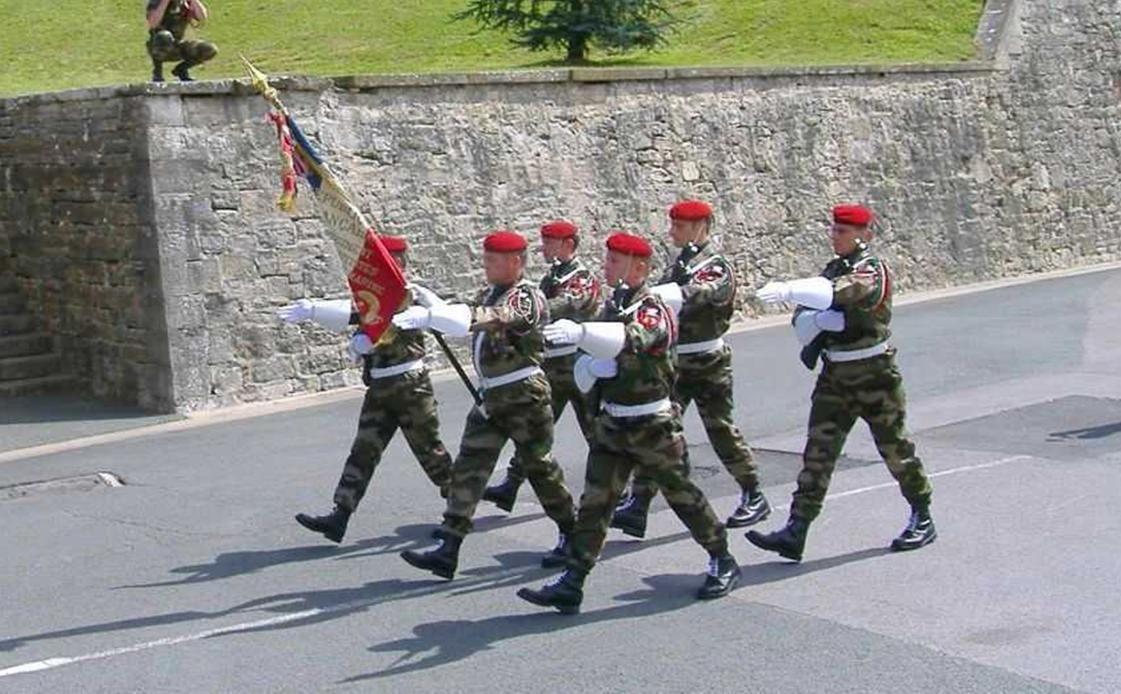
Color Guard of the 1st Parachute Regiment of Marine Infantry November 11, 2008, in Bayonne.

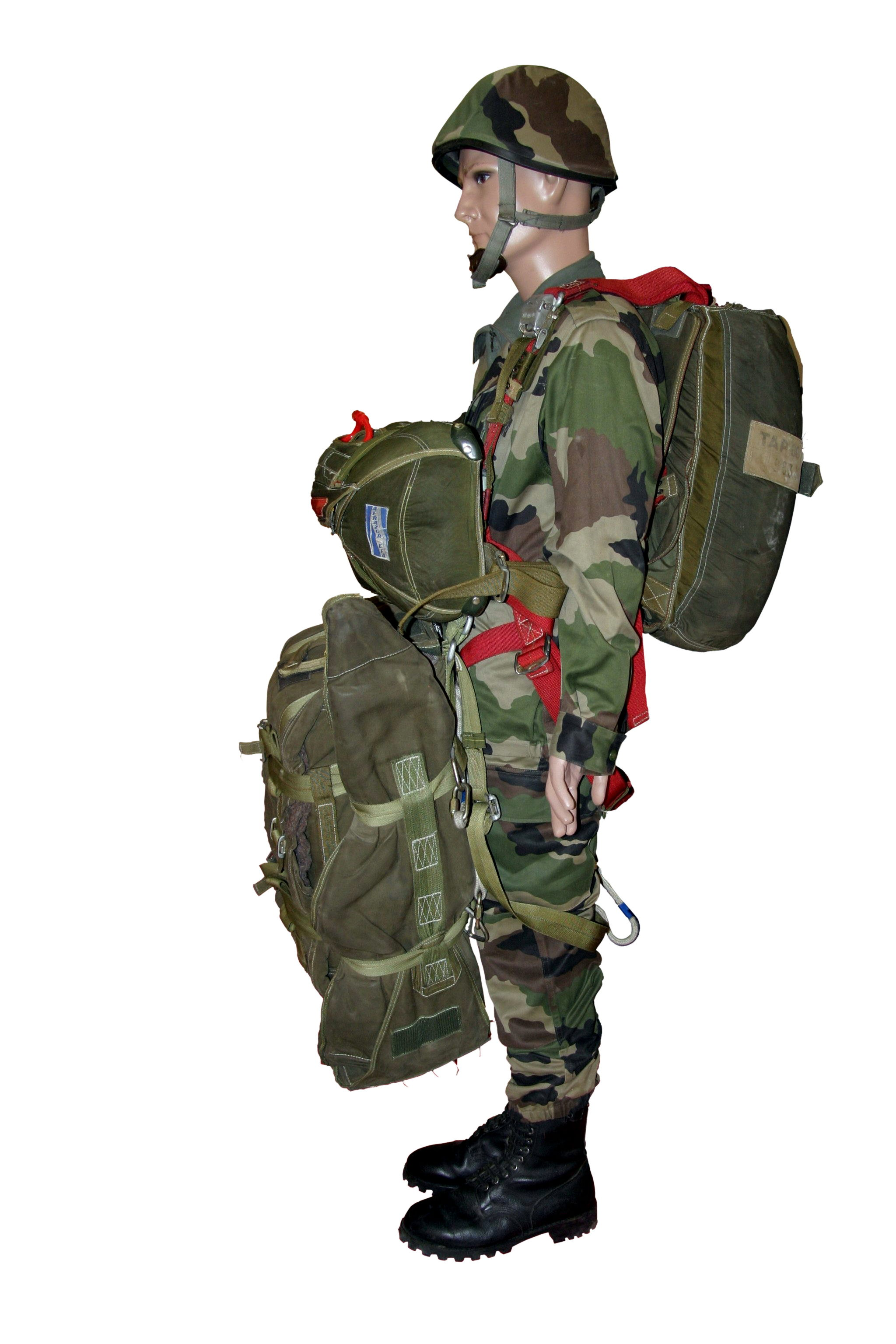
Jumping uniform and equipment worn by parachutists of the Marine paratroops.

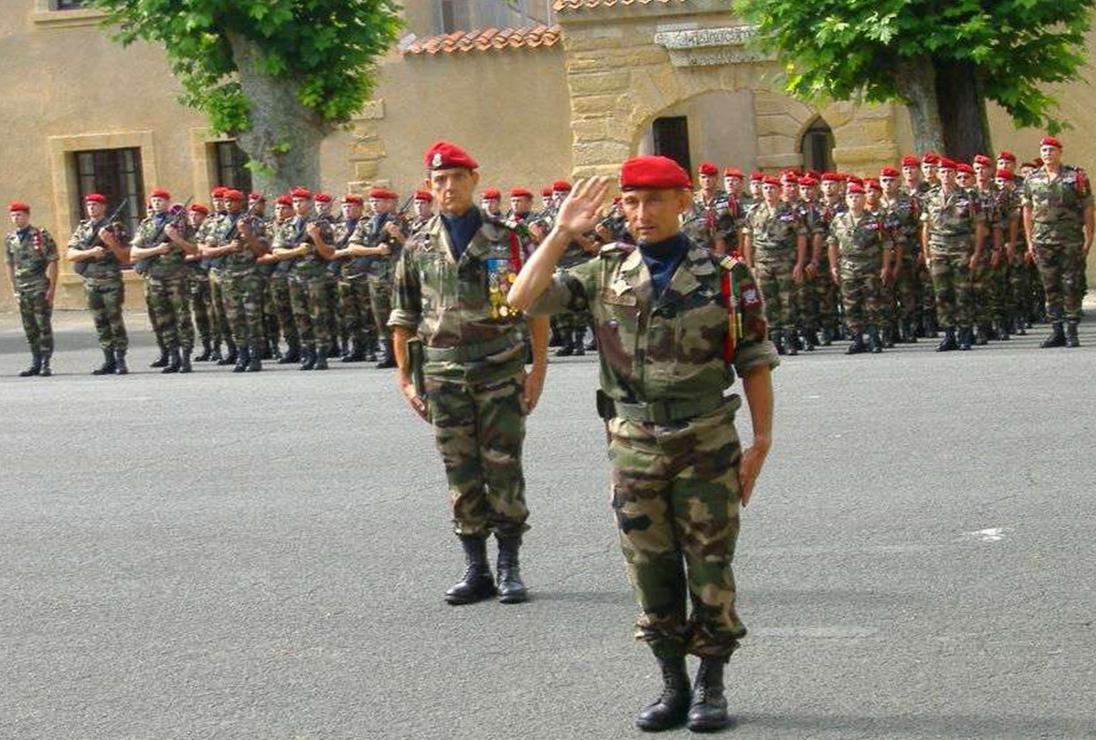
Ceremonial parade of companies of the 1st Parachute Regiment of Marine Infantry, in 2008 at Bayonne.

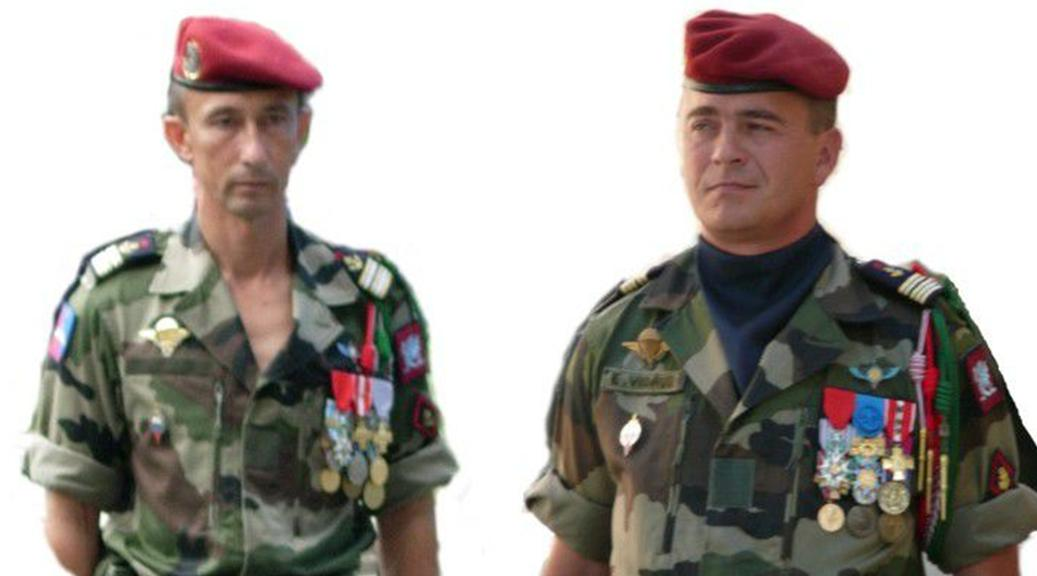
Change of command of Colonel of the 1st Parachute Regiment of Marine Infantry, in 2008 at Bayonne.

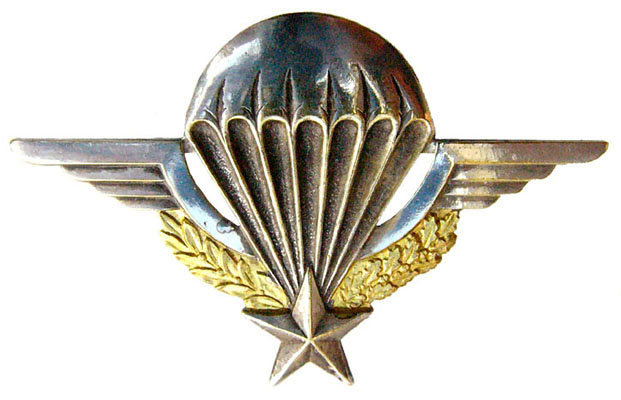
French military parachutist badge

== Traditions ==
The Feast of the Marines: in the name of God, long live the colonials! This expression is believed to have originated with the famous missionary Charles de Foucauld who, when rescued by colonial troops, exclaimed "In the name of God, the great colonials!". Annual ceremonies celebrating the marine troops take place on 31 August and 1 September – the anniversary of the Blue Division. On 31 August detachments of all marine units parade at Fréjus where the Museum of Marine Troops is located. On 1 September veterans hold a ceremony at Bazeilles in Ardennes.

== The anchor of gold ==
As a naval symbol since ancient times, the anchor appeared on the uniforms of French sailors from the late eighteenth century. The Marine Infantry and Artillery troops adopted this insignia at the same time and it remains the modern symbol of the Troupes de marine.

- 1772: a royal ordinance provides for the port anchor badge on the uniforms of the French Royal Navy, including the Marine Regiment.
- 1900: the anchor is carried by the Colonial Infantry with their transfer to the Army.
- 1916: the Colonial Troops adopt the badge of an anchor over a flaming grenade (the latter being a traditional distinction of elite troops).
- 1919: All officers of the Colonial Troops adopt a gold anchor on their kepis.
- 1920: an anchor entwined with a cable becomes the common badge of Colonial Troops.
- 1933: Colonial Artillery gunners no longer wear the grenade insignia.
- 1935: the anchor insignia appears alone on the armbands worn by Staff officers of the Colonial Troops.
- 1939: the anchor no longer to be worn with an entwined cable.
- 1945: the anchor officially sanctioned to be worn on all the attributes (including headgear and uniforms) of the Colonial Troops.
- 1953: approval of a "traditional" anchor design for the CT.
- 1962: introduction of the TDM beret, regulated by the Corps, with the gold anchor badge as the DUI (Distinctive unit insignia).
- 1985: "traditional" anchor now permitted to be carried on pennants and guidons as a badge.

== Current units ==
The headquarters of the Troupes de marine is the Specialized Staff for Overseas and Foreign Affairs (French: État-major spécialisé pour l'outre-mer et l'étranger, EMSOME), which also directs overseas Foreign Legion forces. The General commanding the EMSOME is nicknamed the "Father of the Marine Corps" (le Père de l'Arme des TDM).

The Troupes de Marine include various specialties, which form separate arms in the rest of the Army, including:

- Infantry (Infanterie de marine, abbreviation: -IMa)
  - Régiment de marche du Tchad in Meyenheim (mechanized infantry)
  - 2^{e} Régiment d'Infanterie de Marine (2^{e} RIMa) in Le Mans (infantry)
  - 3^{e} Régiment d'Infanterie de Marine (3^{e} RIMa) in Vannes (infantry)
  - 6^{e} Bataillon d'Infanterie de Marine (6^{e} BIMa) in Libreville (Gabon) (infantry)
  - 21^{e} Régiment d'Infanterie de Marine (21^{e} RIMa) in Fréjus (infantry)
  - 9^{e} Régiment d'Infanterie de Marine (9^{e} RIMa) in Cayenne (French Guiana) (infantry)
  - 22nd Marine Infantry Regiment in Nantes
  - 33^{e} Régiment d'Infanterie de Marine (33^{e} RIMa) in Fort-de-France (Martinique) (infantry)
  - Régiment d'Infanterie de Marine du Pacifique – Nouvelle Calédonie (RIMaP-NC) in Nouméa New Caledonia (infantry)
  - Détachement Terre de Polynésie/Rimap-P (RIMaP-P) in Papeete (infantry)

- Light Cavalry (referred to as "armoured colonials" (blindés coloniaux) in military slang; uses infantry ranks, unlike the rest of the cavalry)
  - Régiment d'infanterie-chars de marine (RICM) in Poitiers (light armoured)
  - 1er Régiment d'Infanterie de Marine (1^{er} RIMa) in Angoulême (light armoured)

- Airborne Infantry (parachutistes d'infanterie de marine, abbreviation: -PIMa)
  - 1er Régiment de Parachutistes d'Infanterie de Marine (1er RPIMa) in Bayonne (airborne/special forces)
  - 2^{e} Régiment de Parachutistes d'Infanterie de Marine (2^{e} RPIMa) in Pierrefonds (Réunion) (airborne infantry)
  - 3e Régiment de Parachutistes d'Infanterie de Marine} (3e RPIMa) in Carcassonne (airborne infantry)
  - 6e Régiment de Parachutistes d'Infanterie de Marine (6e RPIMa) in Castres (airborne infantry)
  - 8e Régiment de Parachutistes d'Infanterie de Marine (8e RPIMa) in Castres (airborne infantry)

- Artillery (Artillerie de Marine, abbreviation: -AMa)
  - 1^{er} Régiment d'Artillerie de Marine (1^{er} RAMa) in Châlons-en-Champagne (artillery)
  - 3^{e} Régiment d'Artillerie de Marine (3^{e} RAMa) in Canjuers (artillery)
  - 11^{e} Régiment d'Artillerie de Marine (11^{e} RAMa) in Saint-Aubin-du-Cormier (artillery)

- Engineers
  - 6e Régiment du Génie – (Marine Sappers) in Angers (engineers)

- Combined Arms
  - 5^{e} Régiment interarmes d'outre-mer (5^{e} RIAOM) in Djibouti

=== Former units with traditions entrusted to other units ===
- 4^{e} régiment d'infanterie de Marine 4^{e}RIMa : bataillon du service militaire adapté de Mayotte.
- 11^{e} régiment d'infanterie de Marine : régiment du service militaire adapté de Polynésie française.
- 67^{e} régiment d'infanterie de Marine : Groupement de transit et d'administration du personnel isolé.
- 5^{e} régiment d'infanterie de Marine : 4^{e} régiment du service militaire adapté in Guyane.
- 7^{e} régiment d'artillerie de Marine : 3^{e} régiment du service militaire adapté in La Réunion.
- 10^{e} régiment d'artillerie de Marine : 2^{e} régiment du service militaire adapté in Guadeloupe.
- 41^{e} régiment d'artillerie de Marine : régiment du service militaire adapté de Nouvelle-Calédonie.

=== Other former Parachute Marine units ===
- Battalions and Colonial Parachute Groups (B.C.C.P, G.C.C.P & B.P.C)
- 5^{e} Régiment de Parachutistes d'Infanterie de Marine (5^{e} RPIMa)
- 6^{e} Régiment de Parachutistes d'Infanterie de Marine (6^{e} RPIMa)
- 7^{e} Régiment de Parachutistes d'Infanterie de Marine (7^{e} RPIMa)
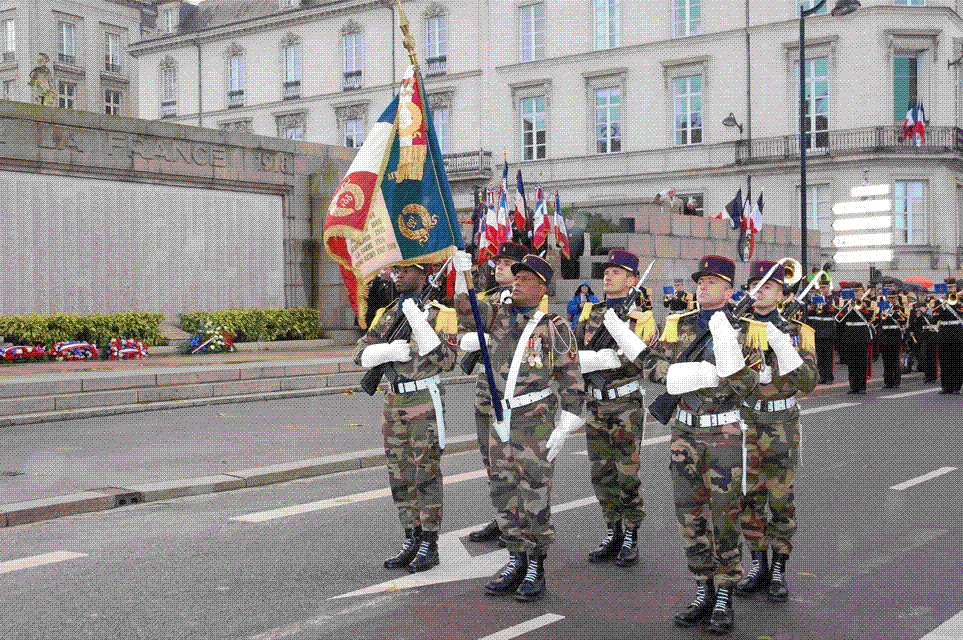
Color Guard of the 22nd battalion of marines, November 11, 2008, in Nantes.

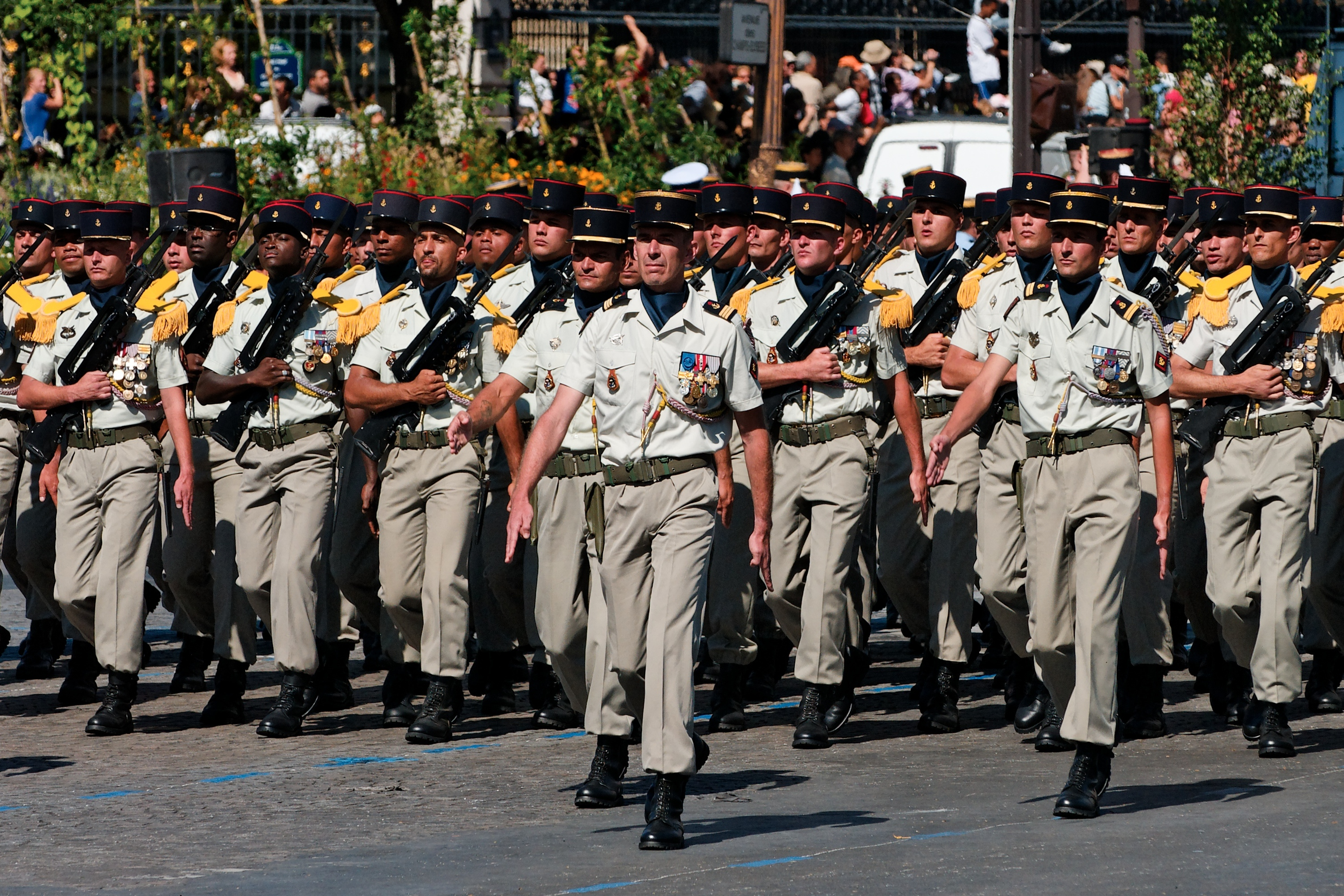
21st Regiment of marine infantry, Bastille Day 2008 military parade on the Champs-Élysées, Paris.

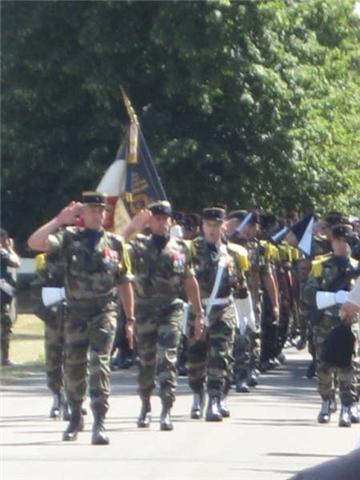
Parade of Companies of the 2nd Marine Regiment, change of command.

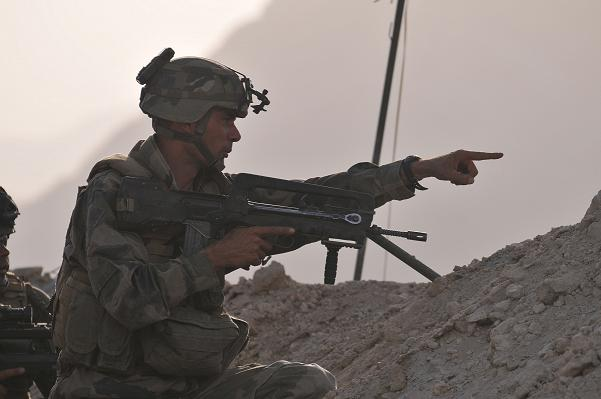
Military marine troops French Task Force, August 13, 2009, GTIA Korrigan (French forces in Afghanistan; 3^{e} RIMa).

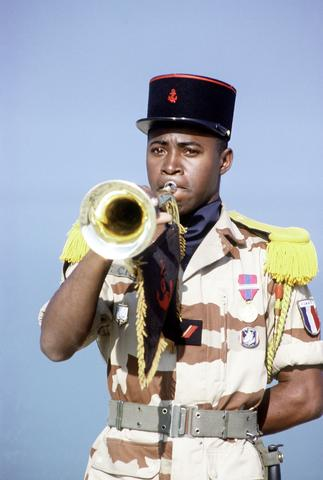
Clarion marine troops in Kuwait after the Operation Desert Storm.

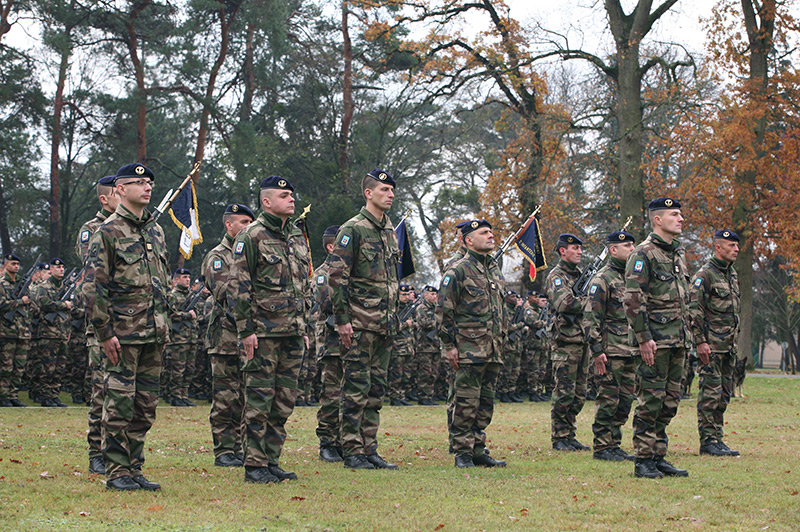
Ceremony of creation of battle group Richelieu, 2nd Regiment of Marines, before departure to Afghanistan.

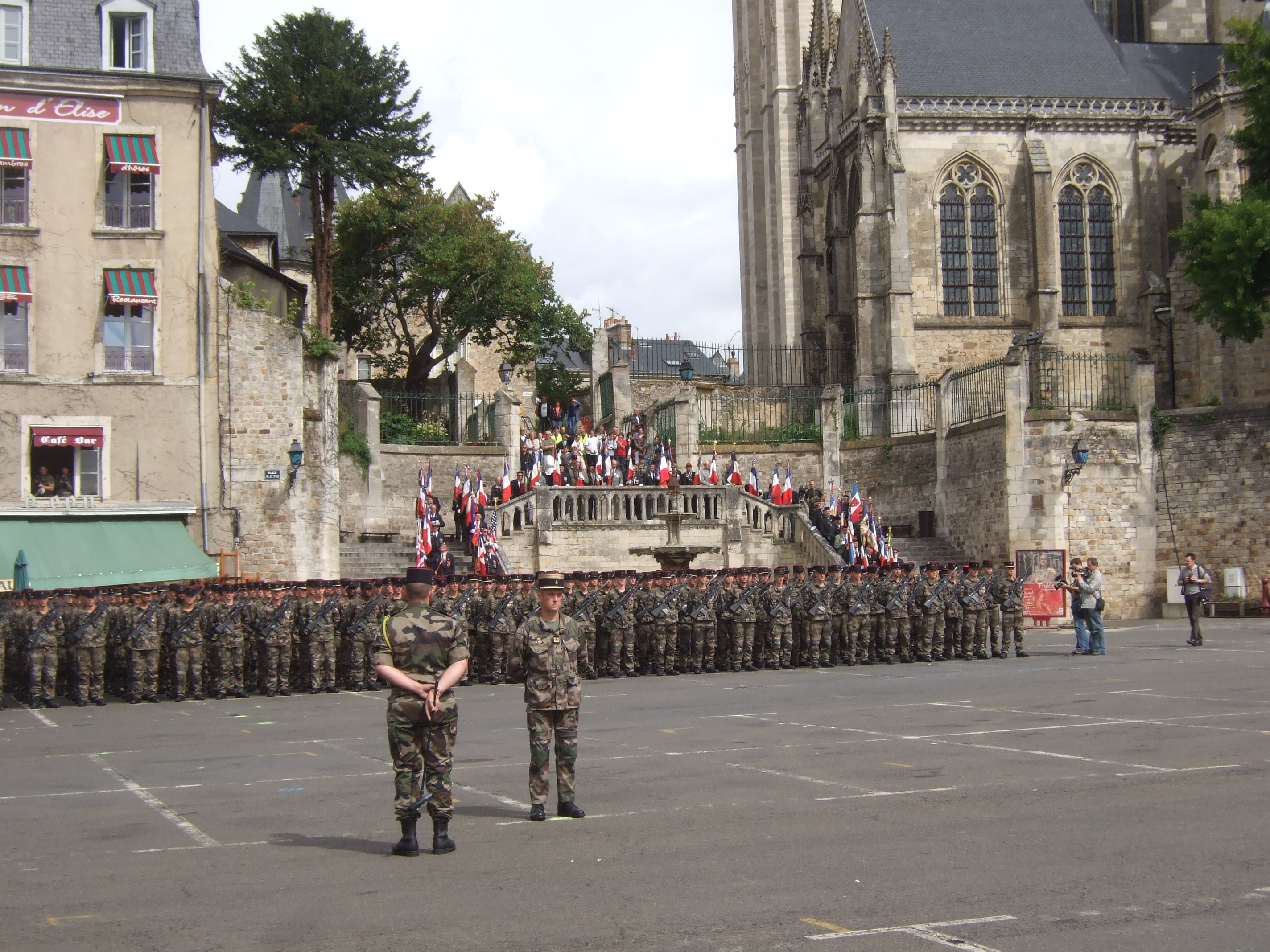
The dissolution ceremony at Le Mans July 7, 2011, the battalion / battle group Richelieu of the 2nd Regiment of Marines after return from Afghanistan.

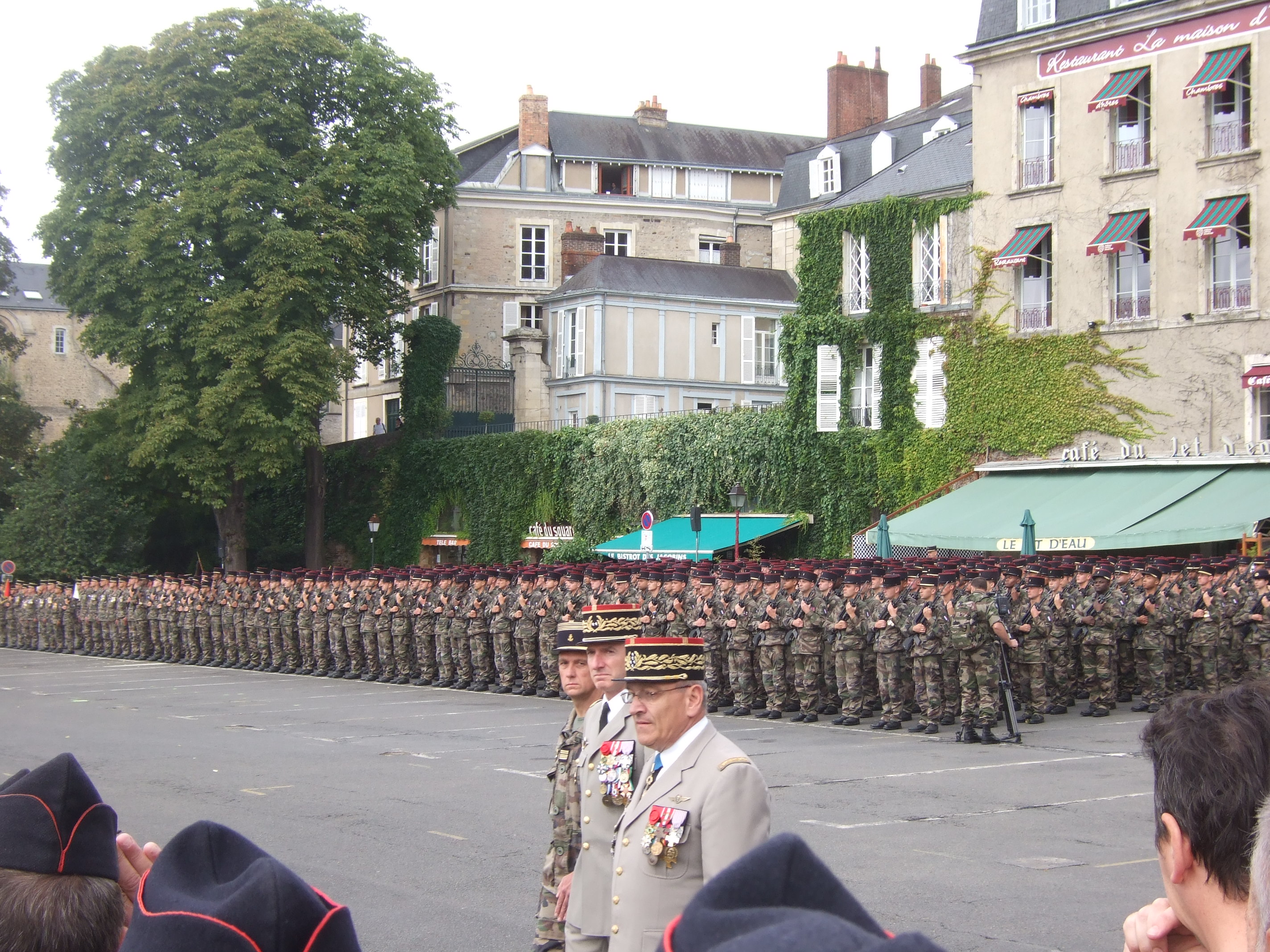
Following the dissolution of the battalion.

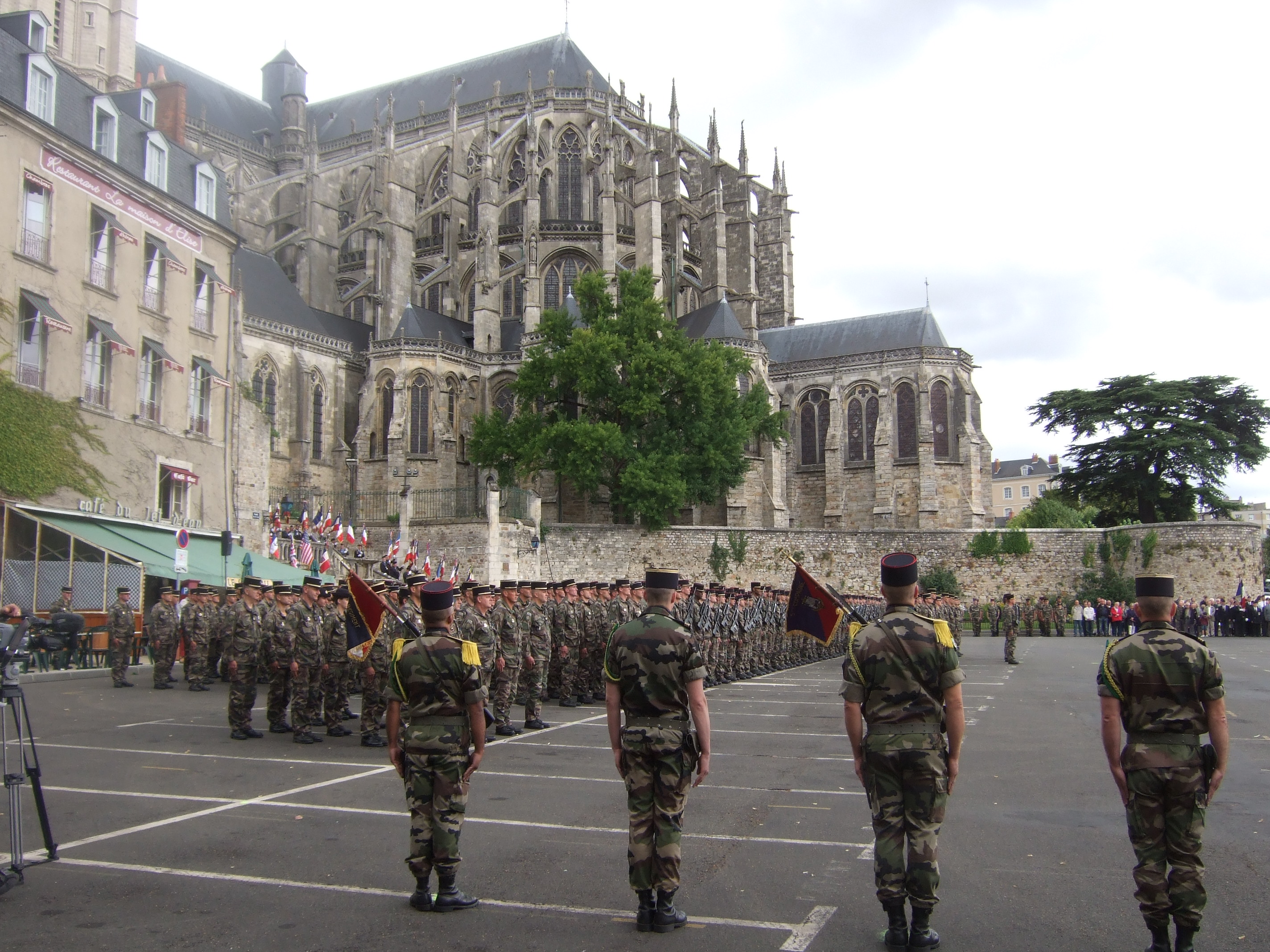
Following the dissolution of the battalion.

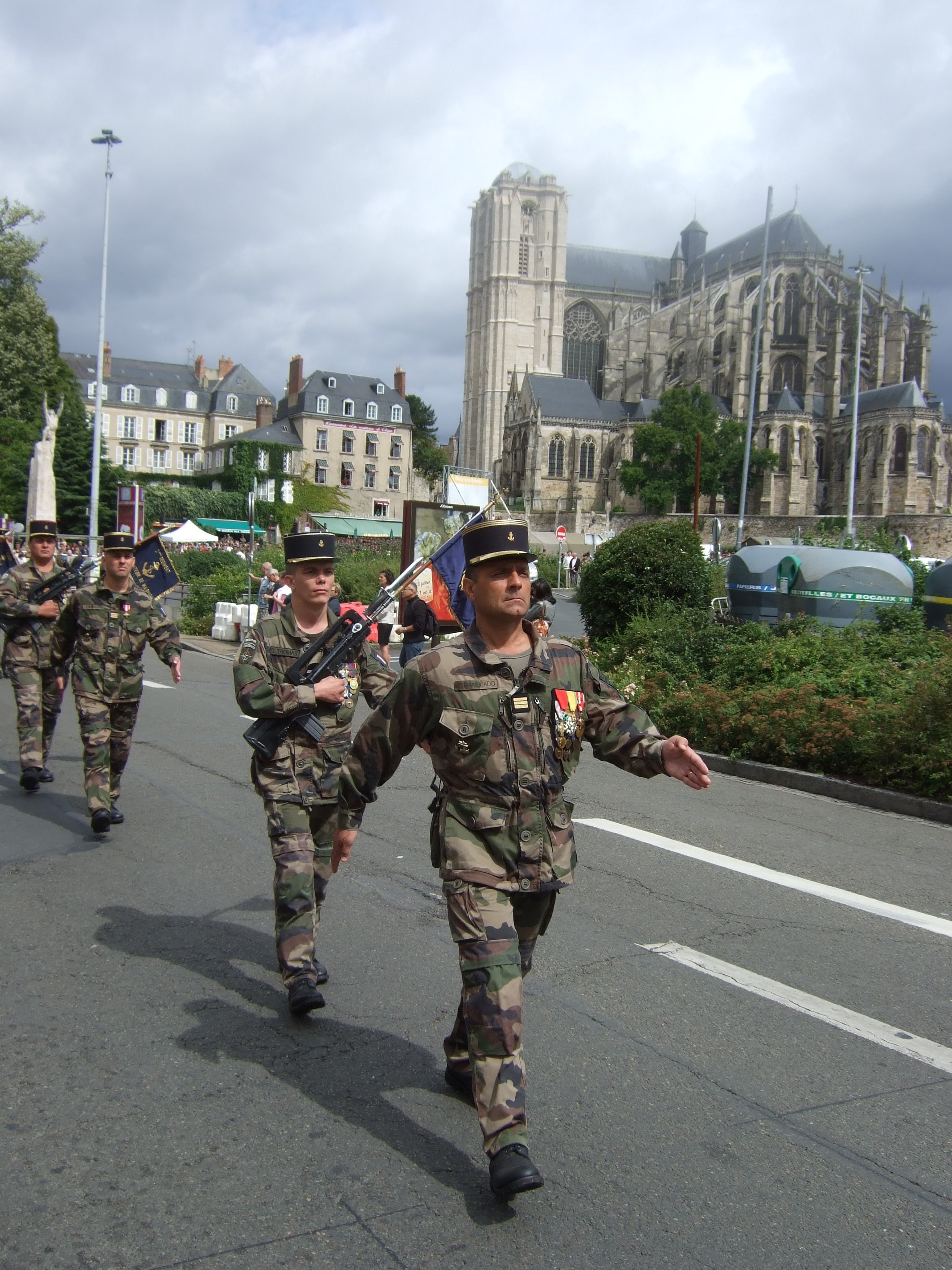
Following the dissolution of the battalion.

== Anthem ==
(traditional)

This song is sung at a brisk pace to marching music

In battle or storm,
The chorus of male songs, (repeat)
Our soul always ready to danger,
Brave and lightning guns.
Men of iron that nothing weary
We look death in the face,
In the roaring storm or rough fight. Forward!
To make a soldier of Marine
You need in the chest
The heart of a sailor and that of a soldier.
Often in the torrid zone,
The tooth tiger or lion
Fever or ball homicide
Just decimate our battalions.
So to the motherland,
We see, contorted with agony,
In a supreme effort to turn our front. Forward!
And we regret unanimous
Dear France, O sublime country!
This is for you to have one life to give.

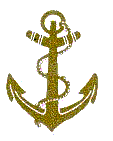

Be proud soldier in the Navy,
Love thy victory bugles
And your face illuminated by burnished,
The brilliance of great deeds.
From the Bosphorus to Martinique,
From Senegal to the Pacific
We see your flag colors shine. Forward!
The glory took you under his wing,
For the honor always faithful,

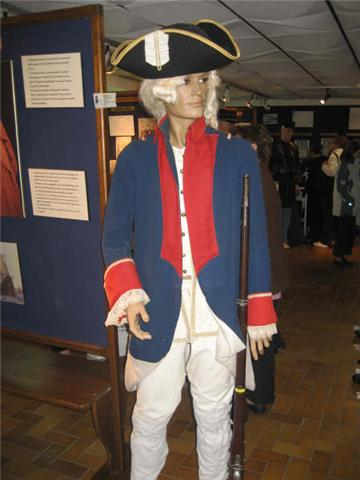
Uniform of the marines under Louis XV at the Museum of the 2nd regiment of marines

You die in battle or you come back victorious.
In every battle in the Crimea,
We too have taken part
De Malakoff under fire,
We were climbing the walls.
At the sight of our uniforms,
That the fire or sword deforms,
The enemy turned pale, stepped back many times. Forward!
And on our foreheads that shines,
We can see the triple crown
The laurels of Podor, of Inkerman and Alma.
When Prussia inundating France,
About Us unleashed its fury,
At his balls as his spears
We have opposed our hearts.
And when the battle roared,
Our forehead, wounded by shrapnel,
Bloody, but untamed, defied the winners. Forward!
A Bazeilles The Cluze and Neuville,
When fighting against one hundred thousand,
The success betrays us but we kept the honor.

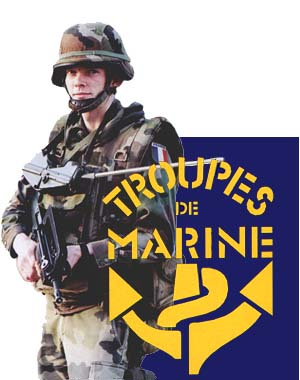
Marsouin marine troops

Constantly ready for any fight;
Valiant soldiers of our major ports,
No nothing can kill you
Who do you count your dead point
You reduce Chinese, Kanaka,
In Madagascar you, Annam and Tonkin. Forward!
Also under the sky its dome
Joined still halo
Son-Tay and Nouméa, Tamatave and Beijing

A day will come, dear hope,
Where the ardent call of bugles,
Will rise to our France
Avengers ... and we will.
So for us, oh what a feast!
We will give younger sisters,
For the victories of Jena, Auerstadt, Stettin. Forward!
Yes we love the holy wars
For the blood of heroes, our fathers,
In our blood on fire, do not flow in vain

== See also ==
- Marine corps
- Tirailleur
- French colonial flags
- French colonial empire
- List of French possessions and colonies
- Moroccan Division

== Sources ==
- Les Troupes de Marine 1622–1984, Paris: Charles-Lavauzelle, 1991, ISBN 2-7025-0316-0 or ISBN 978-2-7025-0316-4.
- Serge Saint-Michel & Rene Le Honzec, Les Batisseurs d'empire Histoire Troupes de marine Tome II 1871–1931
- CEHD (Centre d'Etudes d'Histoire de la Défense), Les troupes de Marine dans l’armée de Terre. Un siècle d’histoire (1900–2000), Paris, Lavauzelle, 2001, 444 p., ISBN 2-7025-0492-2
- Historique du 16^{e} régiment d'infanterie de marine. Année 1900, Paris, H. Charles-Lavauzelle, 1903.
- Louis Beausza, La formation de l'armee coloniale, Paris, L. Fournier et cie., 1939.
- Marcel Vigneras, Rearming the French, Office of the Chief of Military History, Dept. of the Army, 1957
- John C. Cornelius, Richard J. Sommers, Michael Winey, The Military Forces of France, Washington, GPO, 1977.
- Anthony Clayton, France, Soldiers and Africa, London; Washington: Brassey's Defence Publishers, 1988, ISBN 0-08-034748-7 or ISBN 978-0-08-034748-6.
- Comité national des traditions des troupes de marine, De Bizerte à Sarajevo : les troupes de marine dans les opérations extérieures de 1961 à 1994, Paris:C. Lavauzelle, 1995, ISBN 2-7025-0380-2 or ISBN 978-2-7025-0380-5.
