= Operation Serval =

French military operation in Mali (2013–14)

Coordinates: 16.2667°N 0.0500°W

- Part of the Mali War and the War in the Sahel
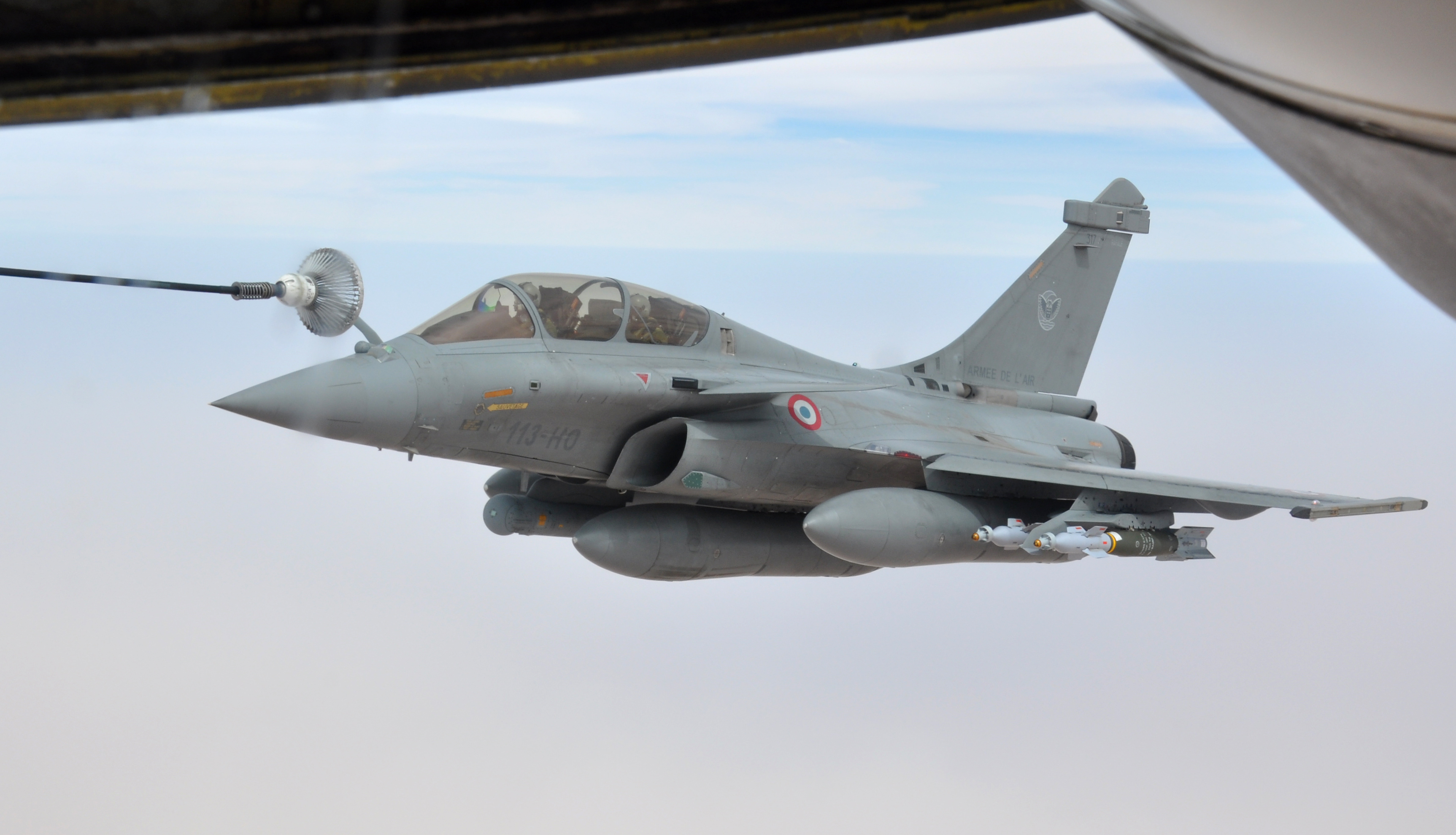
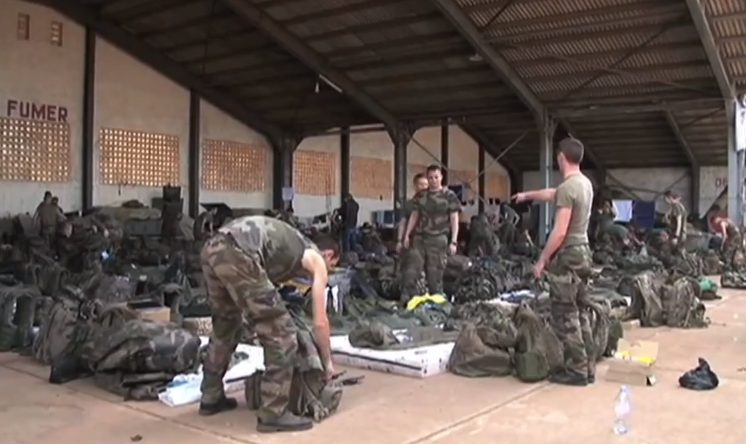
- (Top) A French Dassault Rafale of squadron 2/92 "Aquitaine" refuels from a KC-135 Stratotanker over Africa on 17 March 2013. (Bottom) French troops arriving in Bamako.
Date	11 January 2013 – 15 July 2014 (1 year, 6 months and 4 days)
Location	Mali
Result	Malian/French victory: All major cities controlled by French/Malian troops and other allied troops.; France launched Operation Barkhane on 1 August 2014.

Belligerents
France; Mali; Chad; Nigeria; Burkina Faso; Senegal; Togo; (Azawad) MNLA (latter part of conflict); AFISMA; Supported by: Belgium; Canada; Denmark; Germany; Netherlands; Spain; Sweden; Poland; Australia; United Arab Emirates; United Kingdom; United States	Islamist militants; MOJWA; AQIM; Ansar Dine; Boko Haram; Ansaru

Commanders and leaders
(France) François Hollande (France) Édouard Guillaud (Mali) Dioncounda Traoré (until 4 Sept. 2013) (Mali) Ibrahim Boubacar Keïta (from 4 Sept. 2013) (Chad) Mahamat Déby Itno (Azawad) Bilal Ag Acherif	Abdelhamid Abou Zeid †; Iyad ag Ghali; Omar Ould Hamaha †; Mokhtar Belmokhtar; Abdel Krim †

Strength
4,000 French troops deployed (5,100 involved in total), 2,900 AFISMA	Elements of: between 5,000 and 10,000 fighters (Ansar Dine); 1,000 fighters (AQIM); 500 fighters (MOJWA)

Casualties and losses
(France) 9 killed, 1 Gazelle helicopter lost (Mali) 82 killed (Chad) 38 killed (Azawad) 17 killed, 60 wounded (Nigeria) 2 killed (Burkina Faso) 1 killed (Togo) 1 killed (Senegal) 2 killed	Between 600 and 1,000 killed 50 vehicles destroyed, 150 tons of ammunitions and 200 weapons seized, 60 IEDs defused 109-300 captured

Operation Serval (French: Opération Serval) was a French military operation to oust Islamist militants from the north of Mali, who had begun a push into the center of the country.

Operation Serval followed the United Nations Security Council Resolution 2085 of 20 December 2012 and an official request by the interim Malian government for French military assistance. The operation ended on 15 July 2014, and was replaced by Operation Barkhane, launched on 1 August 2014 to fight Islamist fighters in the Sahel. Three of the five Islamist leaders, Abdelhamid Abou Zeid, Abdel Krim and Omar Ould Hamaha were killed, while Mokhtar Belmokhtar fled to Libya and Iyad ag Ghali fled to Algeria.

The operation was named after the serval, a medium-sized African wild cat.

== Background ==
In January 2012, following an influx of weapons that occurred after the Libyan Civil War, Tuareg tribesmen of the National Movement for the Liberation of Azawad (MNLA) began a rebellion against Mali's central government. In April, the MNLA said it had accomplished its goals and called off its offensive against the government, proclaiming the independence of Azawad. In June 2012, the MNLA came into conflict with the Islamist groups Ansar Dine and the Movement for Oneness and Jihad in West Africa (MOJWA), after the Islamists began imposing Sharia in Azawad.

By 17 July, MOJWA and Ansar Dine had pushed the MNLA out of all the major cities. On 1 September 2012, the town of Douentza in the Mopti Region, until then controlled by the Ganda Iso militia, was taken by the MOJWA, and on 28 November 2012, the MNLA was pushed out of Léré, Timbuktu Region, by Ansar Dine.

== Forces committed ==
=== French Forces ===
==== French Air Force ====
Initially, the French Air Force deployed two Mirage F1 CR Reconnaissance from the 2/33 Savoie Reconnaissance Squadron and six Mirage 2000D fighter jets, which were already part of the French military Opération Épervier in Chad. Additionally, the Air Force deployed three KC-135 Stratotanker planes, as well as one C-130 Hercules and one Transall C-160 transport planes from the French airbase in N'Djamena.

On 13 January, four Rafale fighter jets of the 1/7 Provence Fighter Squadron flew from the Saint-Dizier Airbase in France to attack targets in the city of Gao. The Rafale planes then proceeded to N'Djamena and would remain based there for the duration of the conflict. By 16 January, the French Air Force dispatched two additional KC-135 Stratotanker planes and two Harfang UAVs from the 1/33 Belfort Reconnaissance Squadron to N'Djamena.

To transport Army troops to Bamako, the Air Force used the Airbus A310 and A340 of the 3/60 Estérel Transport Squadron. On 23 January, a detachment of Fusiliers Commandos de l'Air was deployed to the airport in Bamako to provide security for the French Air Force assets stationed there and to execute combat search and rescue missions if necessary. Along with the Fusiliers, the Air Force deployed two Puma helicopters of the 1/67 Pyrénées Helicopter Squadron in the combat search and rescue role to Bamako. On 25 January, the Air Force deployed two additional Rafale fighter jets and two additional KC-135 Stratotanker planes to N'Djamena, bringing the total to six Rafale jets and 5 KC-135's in the theater of operations.

Transall C-160 transport planes from the 1/64 Béarn and 2/64 Anjou squadrons and C-130H Hercules transport planes from the 2/61 Franche Comté squadrons were used to ferry materiel to Bamako, while Transall C-160 transport planes from the 3/61 Poitou Transport Squadron flew reinforcements to the airport of Gao.

==== French Army ====
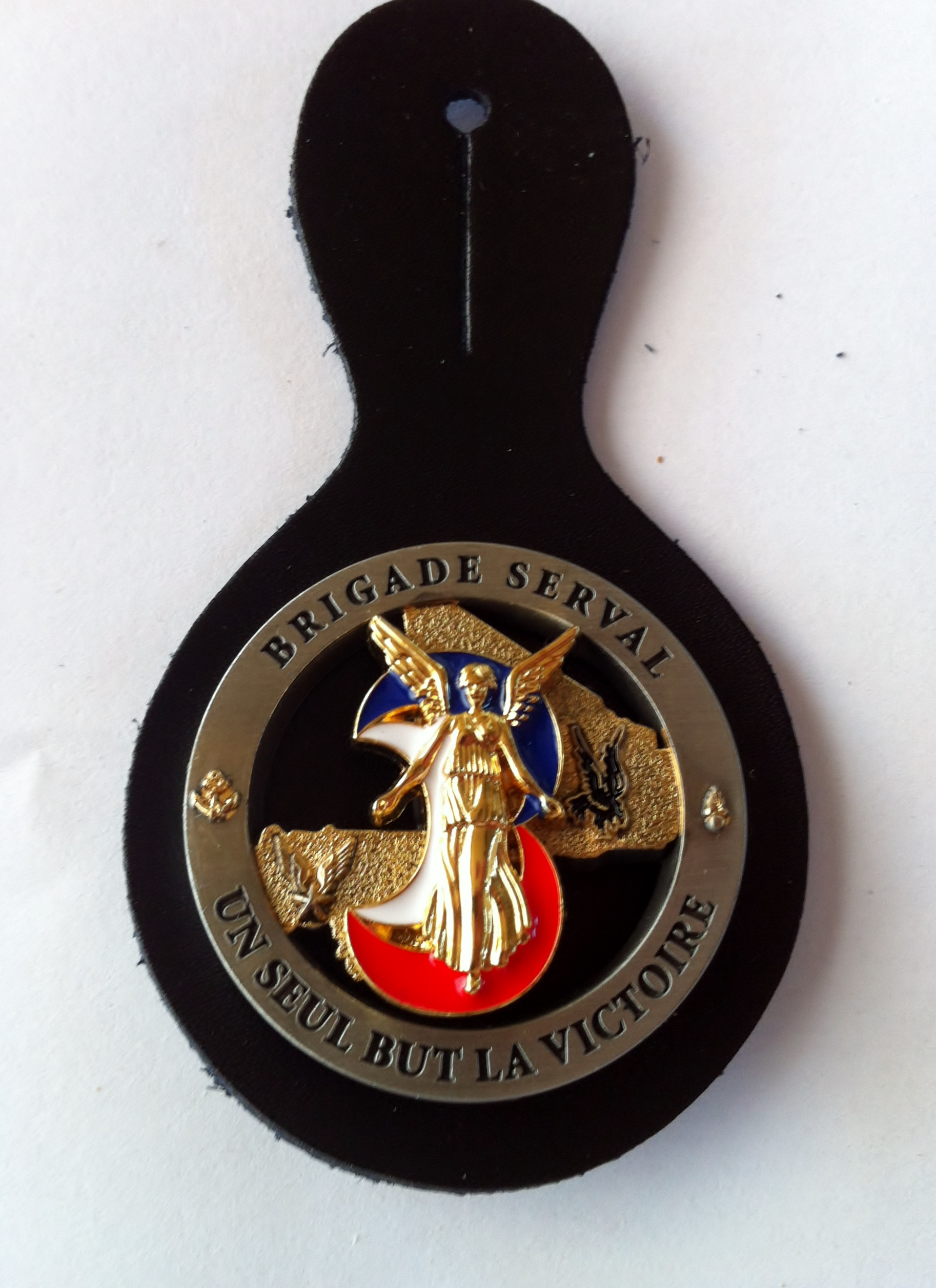
Insignia is on the brigade Serval. Based on that of the 3rd Mechanized Brigade with its motto: "One goal, victory" which was added to the map of Mali and insignia of formations that participated in operations in Mali in 2013.

French Army forces deployed included one company of the 21st Marine Infantry Regiment, an Armored Cavalry platoon of the 1st Foreign Cavalry Regiment and one company of the 2nd Marine Infantry Regiment. On 14 January, the French Army Light Aviation transported Eurocopter Tiger HAP attack helicopters from the 5^{e} Régiment d'Hélicoptères de Combat to Mali. A company from the 3rd Marine Infantry Parachute Regiment and soldiers from the 1st Parachute Hussar Regiment and the 17th Parachute Engineer Regiment, which are all currently deployed as part of Opération Licorne in Ivory Coast, left Abidjan in a convoy of 60 vehicles for the Malian capital of Bamako.

The Commander of the French Land Forces, General Bertrand Clément-Bollée, announced that a company of the 92nd Infantry Regiment, equipped with VBCI Infantry fighting vehicles, has been sent to Mali. An additional three companies equipped with VBCI and one squadron equipped with Leclerc main battle tanks could be sent on short notice if required. An armored company of the Marine Infantry Tank Regiment is being deployed to Mali as are CAESAR self-propelled howitzers.

On 21 January, a company of the 3rd Marine Infantry Regiment arrived in Bamako to provide security for the allied airhead. Ground operations are commanded by Brigadier General Bernard Barrera, commanding officer of the 3rd Mechanized Brigade.

The following units of the French Army were involved in Mali during the first period of operation:

- 3^{e} Brigade Mécanisée (3^{e} BM), deployed from France and tasked with command of the ground operations
  - Brigade Command & Signals Company
  - 1^{er} Régiment d'Infanterie de Marine (1^{er} RIMa), one squadron with AMX 10 RC
  - 92^{e} Régiment d'Infanterie (92^{e} RI), two companies with VBCI
  - 126^{e} Régiment d'Infanterie (126^{e} RI), one company with VAB
  - 68^{e} Régiment d'Artillerie d'Afrique (68^{e} RA), regimental command and one battery with CAESAR self-propelled 155mm howitzers
  - 31^{e} Régiment du Génie (31^{e} RG), one company
- 6^{e} Brigade Légère Blindée (6^{e} BLB), redeployed from Opération Épervier
  - 1^{er} Régiment Étranger de Cavalerie (1^{er} REC), one platoon with AMX 10 RC
  - 21^{e} Régiment d'Infanterie de Marine (21^{e} RIMa), two companies with VAB
  - 3^{e} Régiment d'Artillerie de Marine (3^{e} RAMa), one battery with TRF1 155mm howitzers and MO-120-RT-61 120mm mortars deployed from France on 21 January
- 9^{e} Brigade Légère Blindée de Marine (9^{e} BLBM), deployed from France
  - Régiment d'Infanterie Chars de Marine (RICM), one squadron with AMX 10 RC
  - 2^{e} Régiment d'Infanterie de Marine (2^{e} RIMa), one company with VBCI
  - 3^{e} Régiment d'Infanterie de Marine (3^{e} RIMa), one company with VAB
  - 11^{e} Régiment d'Artillerie de Marine (11^{e} RAMa), one battery with TRF1 155mm howitzers and MO-120-RT-61 120mm mortars
  - 6^{e} Régiment du Génie (6^{e} RG), one company
- 11^{e} Brigade Parachutiste (11^{e} BP), redeployed from Opération Licorne
  - 1^{er} Régiment de Hussards Parachutistes (1^{er} RHP), one troop with ERC 90 Sagaie
  - 1^{er} Régiment de Chasseurs Parachutistes (1^{er} RCP), two companies transported to Kidal from France
  - 2^{e} Régiment Etranger Parachutiste (2^{e} REP), one company parachuted near Timbuktu and was deployed from France
  - 3^{e} Régiment de Parachutistes d'Infanterie de Marine (3^{e} RPIMa), one company
  - 17^{e} Régiment du Génie Parachutiste (17^{e} RGP), one platoon
  - 1^{er} Régiment du Train Parachutiste (1^{er} RTP), one platoon
- Airmobile group
  - 5^{e} Régiment d'Hélicoptères de Combat (5^{e} RHC), with three Eurocopter Tiger attack helicopters and four Eurocopter AS532 Cougar transport helicopters
  - 9^{e} Bataillon de soutien aéromobile, with one Pilatus PC-6 Porter aircraft
- Logistics battalion
  - 7^{e} Régiment du Matériel (7^{e} RMAT), one company
  - 511^{e} Régiment du Train (511^{e} RT), one squadron
  - 515^{e} Régiment du Train (515^{e} RT), one squadron
- 28^{e} Régiment de Transmissions (28^{e} RT), one company
- Régiment Médical (RMED), 7th and 9th field hospitals in Bamako and Sévaré

At the end of May 2013, the French Army began to draw down its forces in Mali. For further combat operations, a mixed combat group named GTIA Désert (Groupement tactique interarmes Désert) was activated in Gao, on 20 May 2013. Only this combat group will remain in the area for further combat operations and to support the MISMA, MINUSMA and EUTM Mali missions, as well as the Malian Army. The GTIA Désert is composed of the following units:

- Headquarters and Command of the 2^{e} Régiment Étranger d'Infanterie (2^{e} REI)
  - 1^{er} Régiment Étranger de Cavalerie (1^{er} REC), one troop with AMX 10 RC
  - 1^{er} Régiment de Tirailleurs (1^{er} RTIR), one company with VBCI
  - 2^{e} Régiment Étranger d'Infanterie (2^{e} REI), one company with VAB
  - 3^{e} Régiment d'Artillerie de Marine (3^{e} RAMa), a mixed unit armed with CAESAR self-propelled 155mm howitzers and 120mm mortars deployed
  - 1^{er} Régiment Étranger de Génie (1^{er} REG), one sapper company, one EOD squad

==== French Navy ====
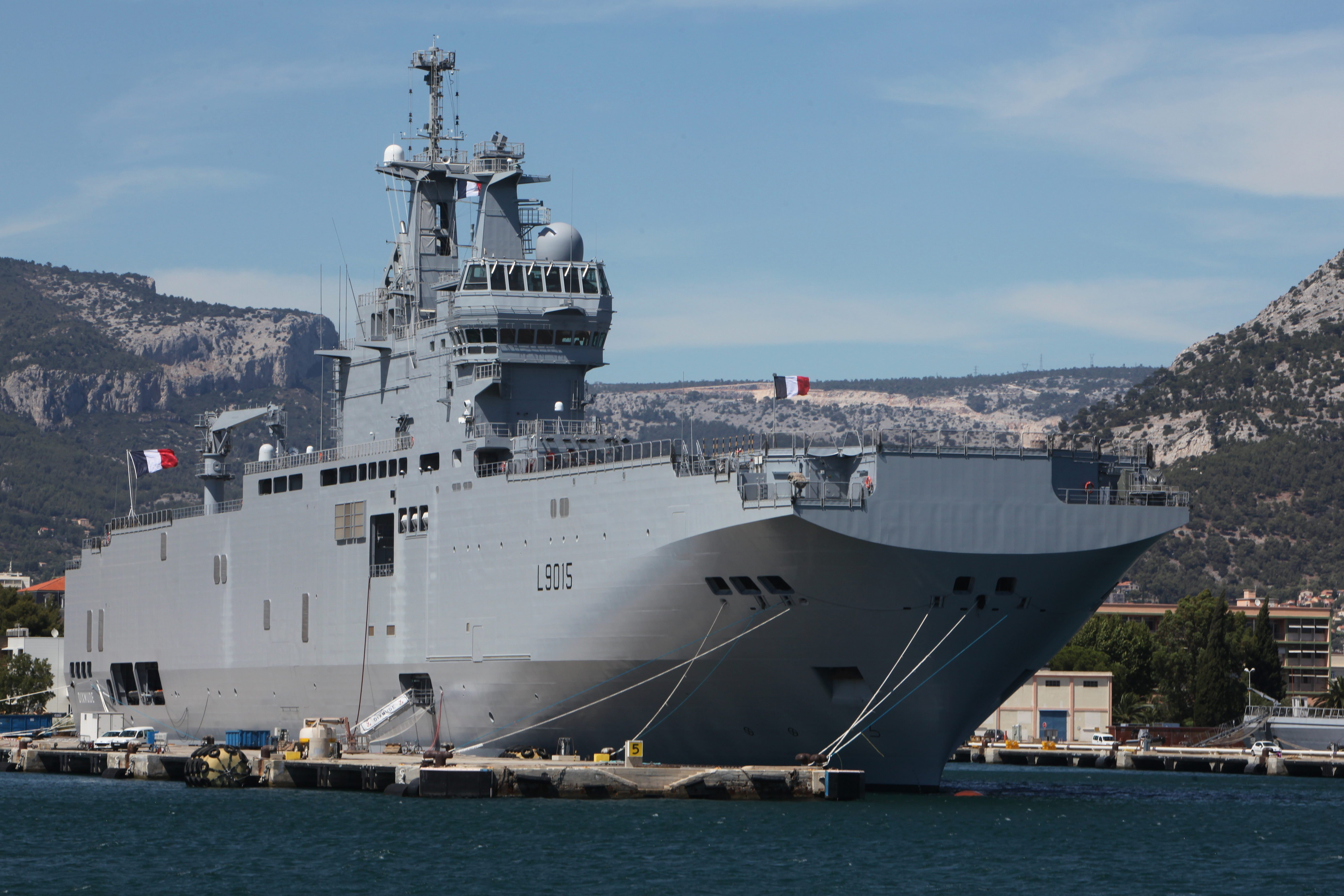
The Mistral-class Dixmude, an amphibious assault ship and helicopter carrier of the French Navy.

The French Navy deployed five Breguet Atlantic long-range reconnaissance aircraft operating from Dakar in Senegal and transported two companies of the 92nd Infantry Regiment along with their equipment and military materiel on the Mistral-class amphibious assault ship Dixmude from Toulon to Dakar in Senegal. Dixmude was escorted on her journey by the D'Estienne d'Orves-class corvette Lieutenant de vaisseau Le Hénaff.

==== Special Forces ====
- Commandement des Opérations Spéciales (COS)
  - Brigade des Forces Spéciales Terre (BFST)(Army)
    - 1^{er} Régiment de Parachutistes d'Infanterie de Marine (1^{er} RPIMa)
    - 13^{e} Régiment de Dragons Parachutistes (13^{e} RDP)
    - 4^{e} Régiment d'Hélicoptères des Forces Spéciales (4^{e} RHFS)
  - FORFUSCO (Navy)
    - Commandos Marine
  - Air Force Special Forces Bureau (BFS) (Air Force)
    - Commando parachutiste de l'air n°10 (CPA 10)
    - Division des Opérations Spéciales/Transport (D3/61 Poitou), C-130 Hercules and C-160 Transall
    - Division des Opérations Spéciales / Hélicoptères (ESH)

==== National Gendarmerie ====
The French National Gendarmerie deployed two platoons of gendarmes to Mali in the military police role:

- 24/1 Mobile Gendarmerie Squadron, one platoon
- 21/9 Mobile Gendarmerie Squadron, one platoon

==== Intelligence ====
DGSE Service Action

=== Allied nations ===
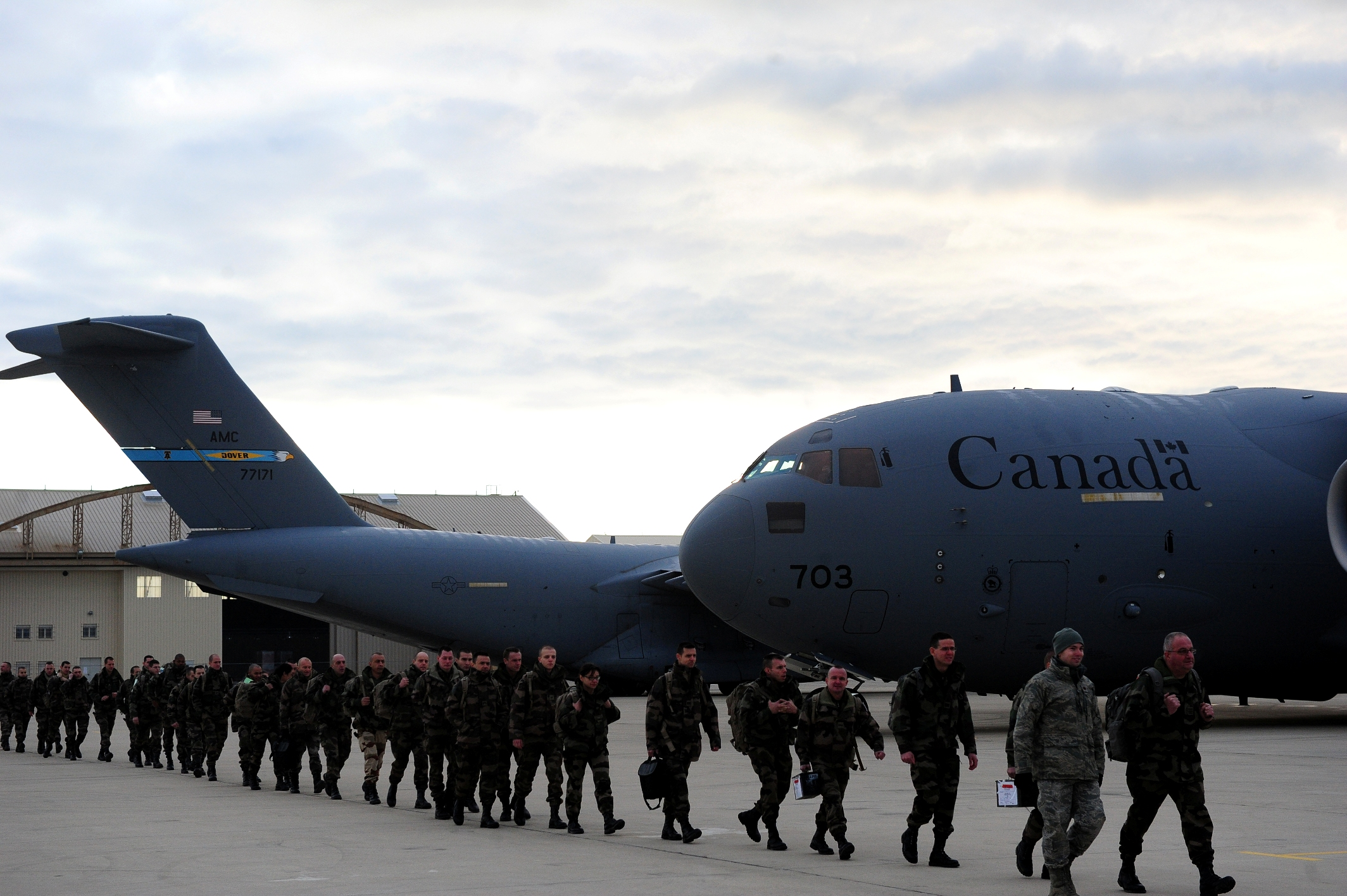
C-17 transport aircraft from the United States and Canada at Istres-Le Tubé Air Base preparing to load French forces, 21 January 2013.

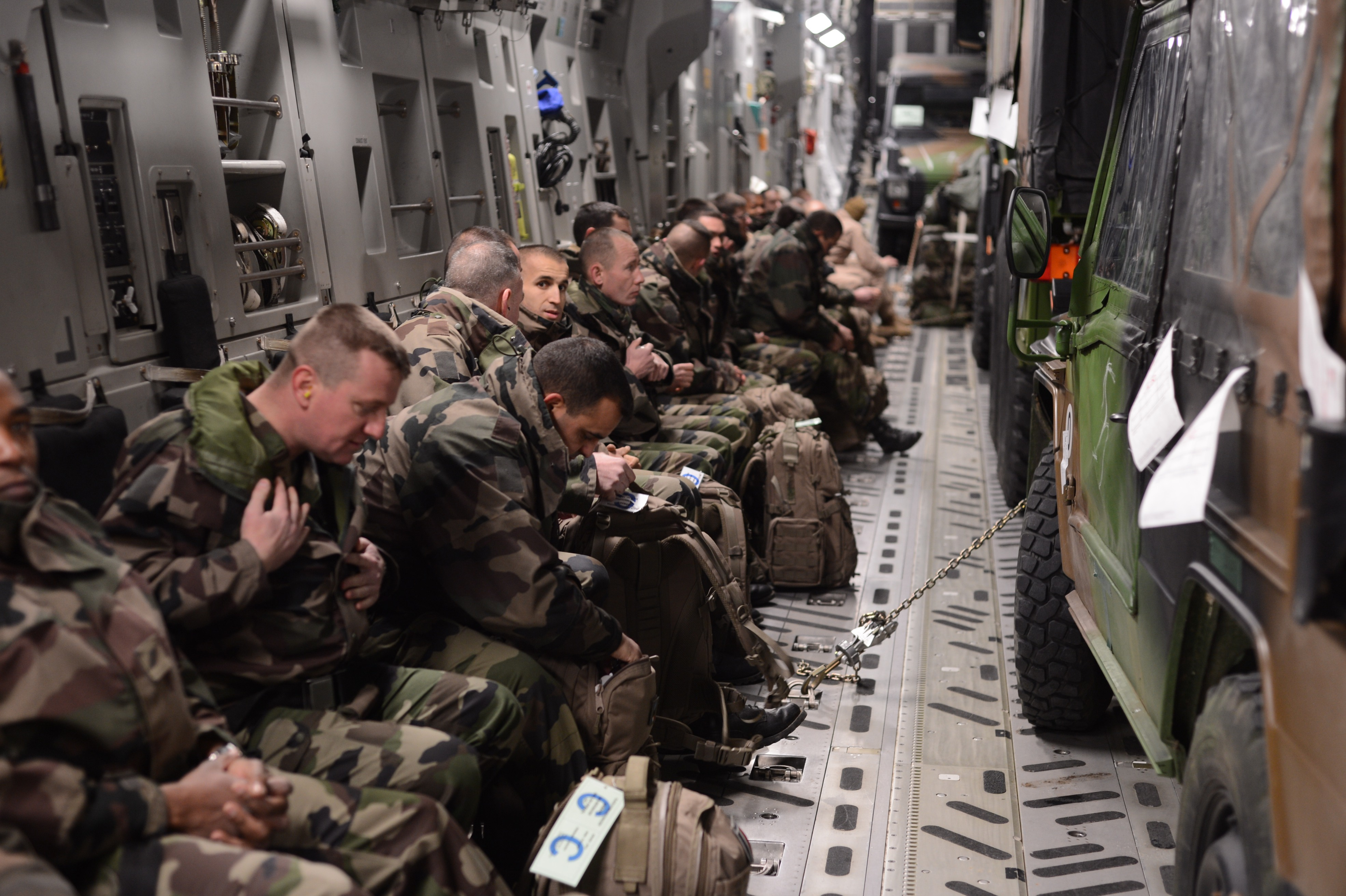
French troops prepare for take-off inside a U.S. Air Force C-17 Globemaster III cargo aircraft in Istres, France.

These are the forces committed by the countries that support France (in alphabetical order):

- Belgium: The Belgian Army deployed two Air Component C-130H Hercules transport planes and two Medical Component Agusta A109 Medevac medical evacuation helicopters along with 80 support personnel to Mali.
- Canada: A Royal Canadian Air Force C-17ER Globemaster III deployed to France to assist with the transport of troops and materiel from France to Mali for one week. According to French Ambassador to Canada Philippe Zeller, the Government of France had requested former Prime Minister Stephen Harper to extend the Canadian deployment.
- Chad: On 16 January, the Chadian government announced that it would deploy 2,000 troops: one infantry regiment with 1,200 soldiers and two support battalions with 800 soldiers. The Chadian forces will not be part of the African-led International Support Mission to Mali, but will be integrated into the French command structure.
- Denmark: A Royal Danish Air Force C-130J-30 Super Hercules with 40 support personnel was deployed on 15 January to Mali.
- Germany: Three German Air Force Transall C-160 were deployed to the Malian capital Bamako to help with the transport of equipment. On 28 February 2013, the German parliament approved sending up to 330 German soldiers to provide engineer mentoring, logistical and medical service to the operation as well as one additional A310 MRTT air-to-air refueling plane.
- Netherlands: Initially, the Dutch government decided to deploy a Royal Netherlands Air Force KDC-10 tanker/transport plane. For its first flight, the aircraft picked up its supplies in France and proceeded to N'Djamena in Chad, where the French military have a logistic support hub. After 14 January 2013, the Dutch began to fly directly into Bamako. Later, the Dutch contribution was increased by an additional KDC-10 tanker/transport plane, four C-130 Hercules transport planes, three CH-47 Chinook transport and Medevac helicopters and one DC-10 passenger plane.
- Spain: A Spanish Air Force C-130 Hercules with 50 support personnel was deployed on 18 January to Mali to help with the transport of African-led International Support Mission to Mali personnel. Spain later added a C-295 plane to assist in troop movements in Mali. An additional 30 soldiers were sent on 13 February to protect allied instructors.
- Sweden: The Swedish government allowed France the use of the Swedish share of the NATO Strategic Airlift Capability. Therefore, one Heavy Airlift Wing C-17 Globemaster III strategic transport plane was dispatched from the Pápa Air Base in Hungary to France to aid in the transport of materiel and troops to Mali. Also, six Swedish parachute rangers from Fallskärmsjägarna will assist as instructors for Mali's armed forces.
- United Arab Emirates: The United Arab Emirates Air Force deployed two C-17 Globemaster III transport planes to aid in the transport of materiel and troops from France to Mali.
- United Kingdom: The Royal Air Force deployed two C-17 Globemaster III strategic transport planes of No. 99 Squadron to the French Évreux Air Base on 13 January 2013. The planes transported French armored vehicles to the Malian capital Bamako in what the British are calling Operation Newcombe. On 25 January 2013, the UK Ministry of Defence announced the deployment of a Sentinel R1 surveillance aircraft to support French forces. The British government announced on 28 January that British troops will deploy to Mali, but that they would not be involved in combat. According to the BBC, on 29 January 2013, it was understood that 40 British advisers were to operate within Mali, and more in other nations, making a total of 350. There was a debate about whether these advisers should be protected by French forces, or by British troops - the latter would result in a deployment of "multiples of dozens".
- United States: The US Air Force established an air bridge between the Istres-Le Tubé Air Base in the South of France and Malian capital Bamako, using up to five C-17 Globemaster III transport planes to ferry French equipment and troops to Mali. A small contingent of American troops provided flight support operations at Bamako. On 26 January, US Defense Secretary Leon Panetta informed French Minister Jean-Yves Le Drian that the "US Africa Command will support the French military by conducting aerial refueling missions as operations in Mali continue". Over the course of Operation Serval, up to 5 US KC-135 were deployed to conduct Air Refueling missions with French Mirage and Rafales, including an impressive 100 sorties in less than two months. US covert ISR aircraft based in Burkina Faso supported the operation. ABC News reported that 150 U.S. military personnel set up and carried out an operation involving surveillance drone over Mali from Niamey.

== Operations ==
A map showing the fullest extent of rebel-held territory (January 2013), before it was re-taken by Malian and French forces.

The operation began on 11 January 2013, with French Army Gazelle helicopters armed with 20 mm cannons from the 4th Special Forces Helicopter Regiment attacking a rebel column near Sévaré. French forces suffered one casualty when a Gazelle attack helicopter came under small arms fire and one of the two pilots was hit. The pilot, Lt. Damien Boiteux, later died of his injuries. The other pilot managed to fly the helicopter back to base, but the aircraft was written off as lost due to the damage sustained.

By 12 January, hundreds of French troops were involved in the military operation in Mali, with special focus in the Battle of Konna. The Malian army claimed that, with their help, it had retaken Konna, which it had lost a few days earlier. French airstrikes appeared to stop the rebel advance to the south which prompted the intervention and destroyed an Ansar Dine command post near Konna.

France asked the U.S. to speed up its contribution by sending drones to improve surveillance over the vast area of northern Mali. The Pentagon was reported to have studied the French request. Meanwhile, the Prime Minister of the United Kingdom announced that his country would lend logistical support to the operation. ECOWAS troops preparing to deploy to Mali also decided to move up their arrival date to 14 January at the latest.

According to Human Rights Watch, 10 civilians were killed when Malian forces fought to recapture Konna.

On 13 January, French planes bombed rebels' positions in Gao. Air strikes hit a fuel depot and a customs house being used as a headquarters by the Islamist rebels. Dozens of Islamist fighters were killed. A Malian security source put the number of dead fighters at 60. On 15 January, the French defense minister confirmed that the Mali military had still not recaptured Konna from rebel forces, despite earlier claims that they did.

On 15 January, French special forces entered the strategically important central town of Markala, describing it as "secured" on 19 January. The French and Malian forces launched a major ground offensive into the North of the country for the first time on 16 January. Along with French help, Malian forces took back control of Konna on 18 January. On 21 January, the Malian military, with the aid of French air support, took possession of Diabaly. The next day, Chadian forces began moving from Niger's capital city, Niamey, to Ouallam, a position some one-hundred kilometers south of the Malian border.

On 25 January, it was reported that a combined force of French and Malian troops captured the town of Hombori, about 100 miles south of Gao. French forces also bombed Islamist troops and their supply stores around Gao. This resulted in the destruction of two Islamist bases with fuel stocks and weapon dumps.

On the morning 26 January, French forces captured the airport at Gao and seized the main Wabary bridge over the Niger River into Gao. French special forces were also in action against rebels that had melted into the local population. During the next few hours, the French-Malian forces assaulted the town of Gao, backed by French warplanes and helicopters. The Islamists lost a dozen fighters, while the French suffered no losses or injuries. A Malian army spokesman said on 27 January that the "Malian army and the French control Gao today".

On the 27 January, French forces captured Timbuktu without resistance after Islamist fighters fled the city to avoid French airstrikes. In capturing Timbuktu, documents left by AQIM were found revealing the strategic organization of the group. After gaining the airport on 27 January, the next day, Malian and French military sources claimed that the entire area between Gao and Timbuktu was under government control and access to the city was available.

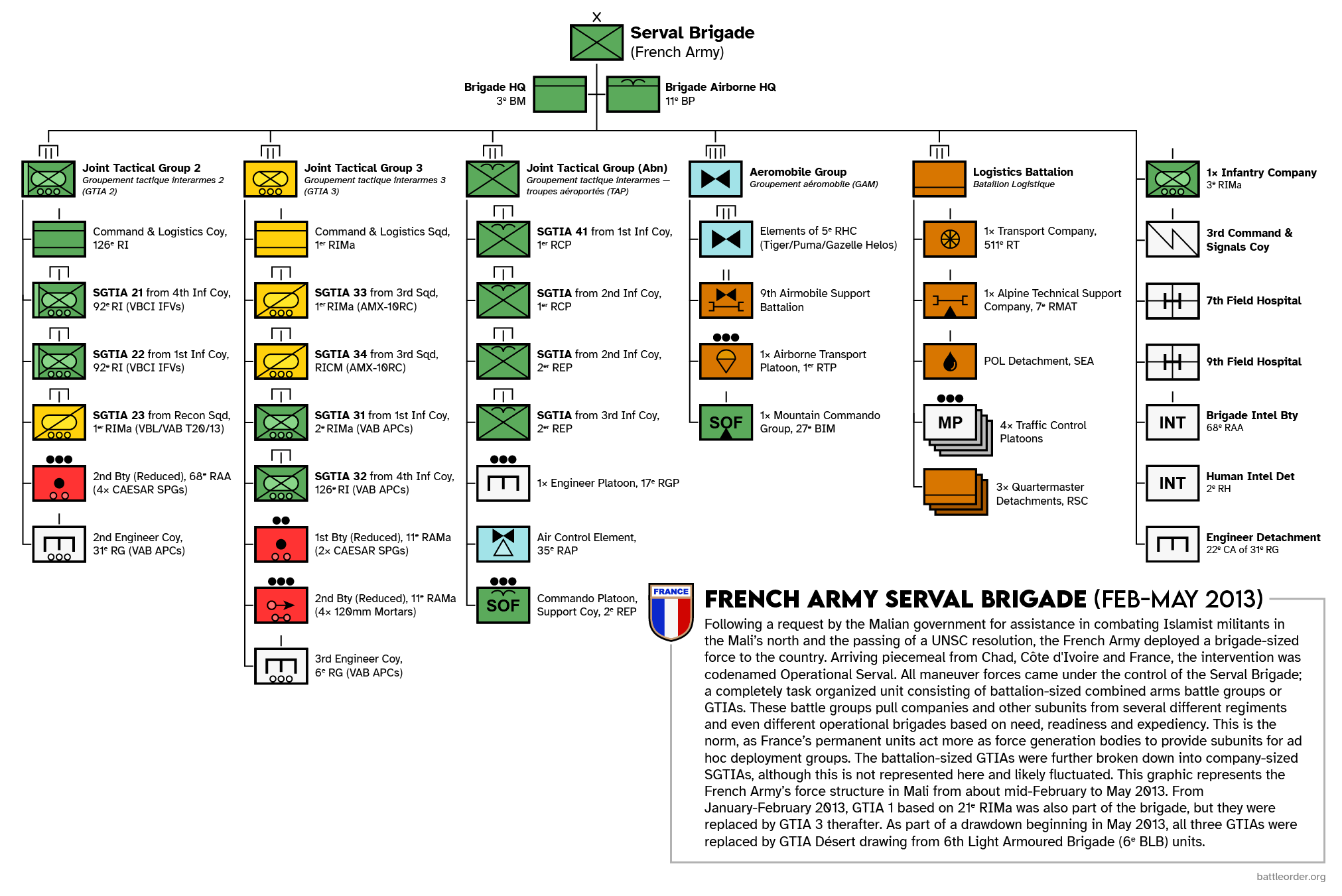
Organization of the Serval Brigade from mid-February 2013 after the replacement of GTIA 1 with GTIA 3.

Three days after capturing Timbuktu, French and Malian forces entered the town of Kidal on 30 January, approximately 200 kilometers from the Algerian border. The town and its airport were taken without resistance from Islamist militants. It was the last major town to be held by the militants. Despite the capture of all major towns, French and Malian forces clashed with Islamists outside Gao on 5 February. Several French troops suffered light wounds during the skirmish, which involved long-range small arms and rocket fire. On 8 February, French and Chadian troops claimed to have occupied the town of Tessalit, near the Algerian border, and seat of one of the last airports still not controlled by the Malian government and its allies. The same day, the first suicide attack in the conflict took place in Gao, resulting in one Malian soldier injured and the death of the attacker. On 10 February, the Islamists made an attack in Gao, which was countered by French and Malian troops securing the nearby area of Bourem on 17 February.

Two French Air Force Rafale fighter jets operating over Mali.

On 19 February, a French soldier (member of the French Foreign Legion) was killed during heavy fighting in the Adrar des Ifoghas mountains in the far North East of Mali near the Algerian border. On 3 March, a French paratrooper was killed in the same area and the Chadian army announced the killing of the two Islamist Algerian leaders, Abdelhamid Abou Zeid and Mokhtar Belmokhtar. This was not confirmed by the French army. On 5 March, the death of Abou Zeid was confirmed by a member of Al-Qaeda in the Islamic Maghreb (AQIM).

On 6 March, a French Army sergeant from the 68th African artillery regiment was killed during an operation in eastern Mali around 100 km (60 miles) from the town of Gao, the former stronghold of the Movement for Oneness and Jihad in West Africa (MOJWA). On 17 March, a corporal from the 1st Marine Infantry Regiment was killed when his vehicle was hit by an Improvised explosive device in the south of Tessalit in the Adrar des Ifoghas massif. Three other soldiers were wounded by the explosion.

On 30 March, the city of Timbuktu was attacked when a suicide bomber blew himself up at a Malian army checkpoint, allowing a group of rebels to infiltrate by night. A contingent of around fifty French soldiers supported by French fighter jets were then sent to reinforce the Malian army who could not repel the rebel attack. By 1 April, rebel presence in the city was cleared. On 12 April, two suicide bombers detonated their belts, blowing themselves up near a group of Chadian soldiers, in a busy market in Kidal. At least three soldiers were killed in the explosion and a dozen of civilians were wounded.

On 11 May 2013, the command of ground operations of in Mali passed from the 3^{e} Brigade Mécanisée to the 6^{e} Brigade Légère Blindée. On 25 May 2013, French forces began their first stage of withdrawal when a convoy of lorries left Bamako for Ivory Coast, carrying equipment and vehicles no longer needed. On 30 July, a French soldier was killed in a vehicle accident and a second soldier suffered injuries. This marked the ninth death among French soldiers killed in support of operations in Mali.

The second in command of AQIM, Hacene Ould Khalill, was killed during a raid by French special forces near Tessalit in November 2013.

=== Battle of Dayet in Maharat ===
Battle of Dayet en Maharat
- Part of Northern Mali conflict
Date	16–17 April 2014
Location	Dayet, Mali
Result	French Victory

Belligerents
France	al-Qaeda in the Islamic Maghreb

Strength
Special Forces	20, 2 pickup trucks

Casualties and losses
None	10–12 killed

On the evening of 16 April 2014, the French army destroyed two pickup trucks containing jihadists north of Timbuktu. They then used air and ground forces to intercept other vehicles. During the night of 16 to 17 April, the French special forces, backed by troops from Operation Serval and helicopters come in contact with the Islamist fighters. The French began by firing warning shots, but the jihadists refused to surrender and opened fire. Faced with the advance of the French military, they abandoned their vehicles and ran, suffering more losses. According to the French Ministry of Defense "part of the terrorist group" is "neutralized. According to the staff of the armies, a dozen fighters are neutralized, that is to say killed.

A number of hostages were abandoned by their jihadist captors at the beginning of the fight. The former hostages were then exfiltrated by the French military. Those released were Malians and four Tuaregs. On the evening of 17 April, in a joint statement, the French president and the president of Mali, announced the release of five hostages. The ICRC also published a statement in which he welcomed the release and said that two humanitarian workers had suffered minor injuries but their life was not in danger.

== Reactions ==
In the wake of the French deployment, ECOWAS said that it had ordered its African-led International Support Mission to Mali to be deployed immediately, and the European Union said it had increased preparations for sending a military training mission, EUTM Mali.

UN Secretary-General Ban Ki-moon hoped on 12 January that the French government's decision would "be consistent with the spirit" of UN Security Council resolution 2085 adopted in December. Algerian foreign ministry spokesman Amar Belani expressed support for the Malian transitional authorities, and "noted that Mali has asked, in line with its sovereignty, for friendly powers to reinforce its national capacities to fight terrorism".

Anders Fogh Rasmussen, Secretary General of NATO (2009-2014), said that he did not see a role for the NATO in Mali (NATO can't be the world's policeman, travelling from country to country, solving all the problems. So I think it's a good idea to have a division of labour. [..] the United Nation Security Council has mandated an African-led stabilisation force to take action in Mali).

Germany could take part in any European training mission to Mali to help its government prepare troops to counter the insurgents, German Chancellor Angela Merkel said on 14 January. German foreign minister Guido Westerwelle ruled out the possibility of German armed forces taking part in a combat mission in Mali, but he also said Germany was prepared to help train the Mali Armed Forces.

On 14 January, the Tuareg separatist MNLA declared it would fight alongside the French and even the Malian government to "end terrorism in Azawad". The spokesman also declared that the MNLA would be a more effective force than those of the neighboring West African nations "because of our knowledge of the ground and the populations".

Mathieu Guidère, a scholar of Islam and the Arab world at the University of Toulouse, said in an interview published in the newsmagazine Jeune Afrique, that without the French military intervention the state of Mali would have fallen.

France's stated rationale for the operation is that to do otherwise would allow "a terrorist state at the doorstep of France and Europe."

Israeli Prime Minister Benjamin Netanyahu praised the intervention in a phone call with French President François Hollande as "a brave step against extremist Islamic terrorism".

Egypt's former President Mohammed Morsi criticized France's intervention.

On 26 January, during the CELAC and European Union summit in Santiago de Chile, Colombia and Chile both expressed support for the French military intervention in Mali. Colombia's president, Juan Manuel Santos, stated that "Colombia has suffered so much from terrorism that it can not disagree with this action."

A 2013 Al Jazeera poll found that 96% of Malians in Bamako supported French intervention.

== See also ==
- Northern Mali conflict (2012–present)#Foreign intervention (January 2013)
- Battle of Konna
- List of battles involving France in modern history
- Operation Barkhane

== Bibliography ==
- Comolli, Virginia (2015). Dwyer, Michael; Leitch, Daisy; May, Kathleen; Weisweiller-Wu, Lara; Arefin, Farhaana; Clarke, Alicia; Uselyté, Raminta (eds.). Boko Haram: Nigeria's Islamist Insurgency (1st ed.). London, United Kingdom of Great Britain: Hurst Publishers (C. Hurst & Co. Ltd.). ISBN 978-184904-491-2.
