= 3rd Marine Artillery Regiment (France) =

French Army regiment

- 3^{e} Régiment d'Artillerie de Marine
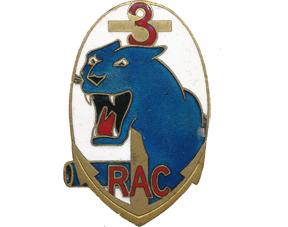
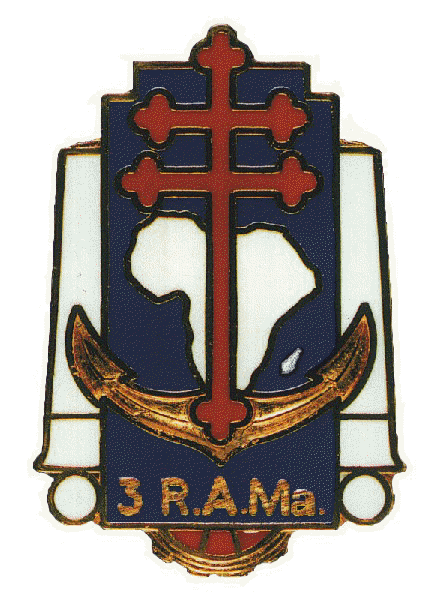
- Regimental Insignia of the 3^{e} R.C.A; Regimental Insignia of the 3^{e} R.A.Ma
- Active: 1803–1900; 1900–1940; 1943–Present
- Country: France
- Branch: Marine Troops; French Army
- Type: Regiment
- Role: Artillery; Amphibious warfare Reconnaissance; Anti-aircraft warfare
- Part of: 6th Light Armoured Brigade
- Garrison/HQ: Camp de Canjuers
- Colors: Red and blue
- Anniversaries: Bazeilles
- Engagements: World War I World War II War on terror (2001-present)
- Battle honours: Hanau 1813; Mogador 1844; Dahomey 1892; Tien-Tsin 1900; Maroc 1908-1913; Champagne 1915; La Somme 1916; La Serre 1918; Fezzan 1942; Sud Tunisien 1943; Paris 1944; Strasbourg 1944

Insignia
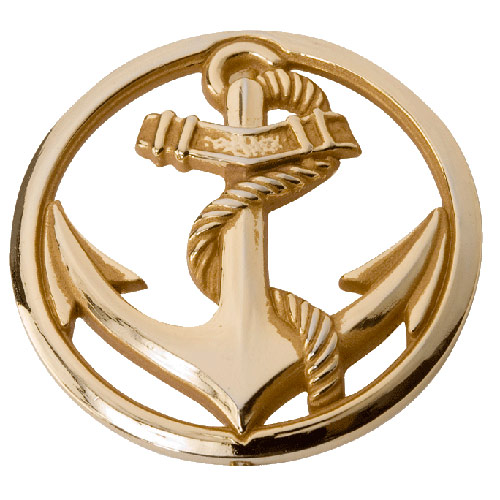
- Beret badge of the Troupes de Marine
- Abbreviation: 3^{e} RAMa

The 3rd Marine Artillery Regiment (French: 3^{e} Régiment d'Artillerie de Marine, 3^{e} RAMa) is the heir to the 3rd Marine Artillery Regiment created in Rochefort by Napoleon Bonaparte's consular decree of May 13, 1803, the 3rd Colonial Artillery Regiment, then the 3rd Marine Artillery Regiment. The 3^{e} RAMa has been present in either a constituted corps or isolated unit since 1803, on almost all the battlefields in which France has been engaged. The regiment was founded in a third operational phase in 1943.

== Creation and different nominations ==
- On December 1, 1902 : 3rd Colonial Artillery Regiment at Toulon.
- On January 1, 1924 : 310th Colonial Artillery Portable Regiment.
- On May 5, 1929 : 3rd Colonial Artillery Regiment, Joigny, 2nd formation.
- On December 1, 1932: the regiment was designated as the 3rd Divisional Horse-drawn (hippomobile) Colonial Artillery Regiment.
- In June 1940 : disappeared, the regiment was dissolved.
- In July 1943 : 3rd Colonial Artillery Regiment, 3rd formation from artillery batteries present in Africa.
- In November 1943 : I/3rd Colonial Artillery Regiment.
- On October 1, 1945 : Divisionary Automative Artillery Group of the 2nd Armored Division 2^{e} DB, Vernon.
- On July 1, 1960 : I/ 3rd Marine Artillery Regiment, artillery regiment of the 10th Armored Division 10^{e} DB, at Verdun, until 1991.
- On July 1, 1994 : Canjuers

== History since 1813 ==
=== World War II ===
On May 10, 1940, the 3rd Colonial Infantry Divisionary Regiment was part of the 3rd Colonial Infantry Division.

The 3rd Colonial Division included the 1st Colonial Infantry Regiment (1^{er} RIC), 21st Colonial Infantry Regiment (21^{e} RIC), 23rd Colonial Infantry Regiment (French: 23^{e} Régiment d'Infanterie Coloniale, (23^{e} R.I.C)), the 3rd Colonial Artillery Regiment (3^{e} RAC), 203rd Colonial Artillery Regiment (203^{e} RAC). The 3rd Colonial Infantry Division disappeared.

Reconstituted progressively from individuals rallying to général de Gaulle since August 1940, the regiment participated to operations of column Leclerc, then integrated the 2nd Armored Division of général Leclerc.

=== Post War ===
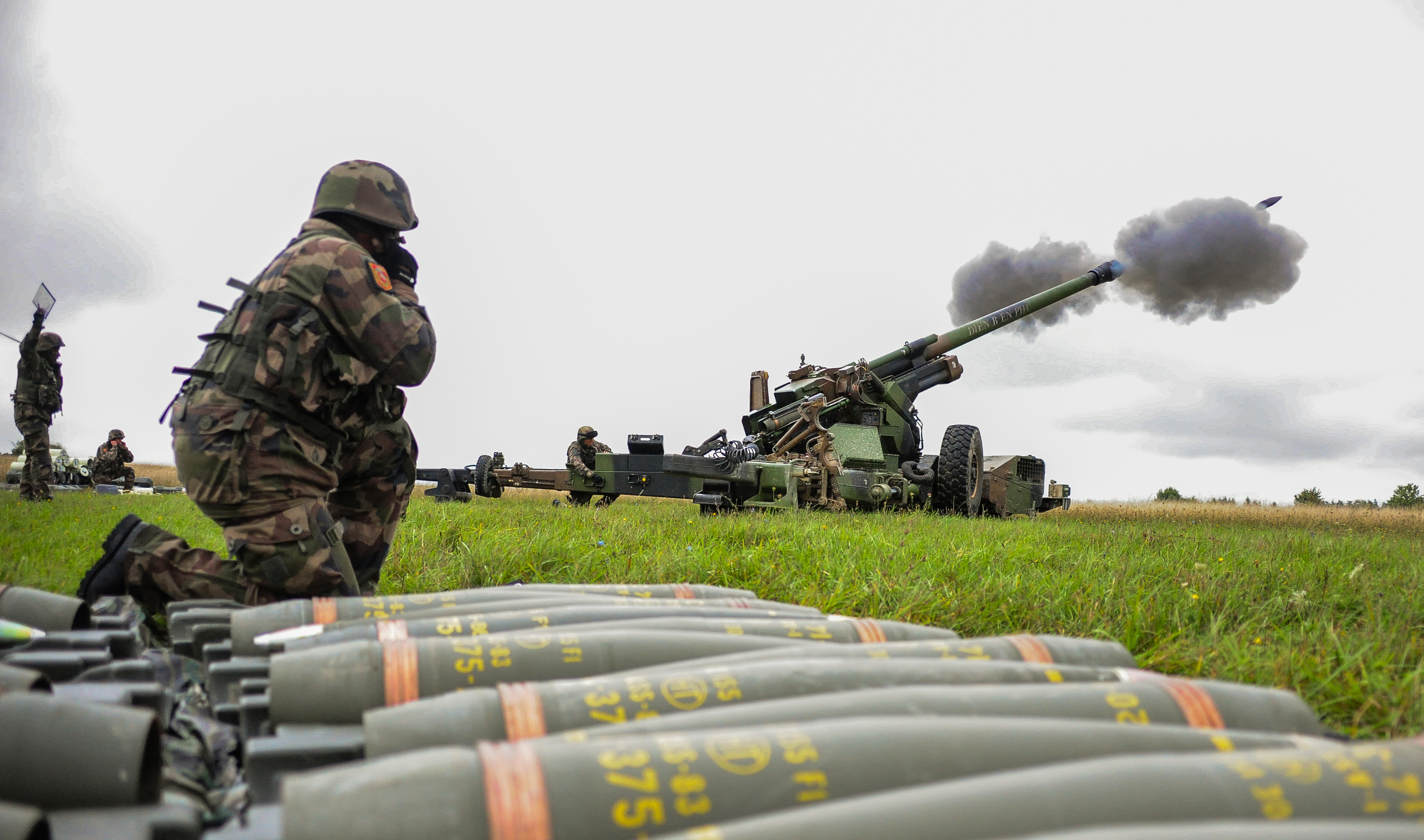
French marines of 3rd Marine Artillery Regiment fire a French TRF1 155 mm howitzer as part of a live fire exercise during Combined Endeavor at the Joint Multinational Training Command's Grafenwoehr Training Area, Germany, Sept. 17, 2013.

- Divisionary Automative Artillery Group of 2nd Armoured (Vernon since October 1, 1945)
- I/3^{e} Marine Artillery Regiment July 1, 1960, the artillery regiment of the 10th Armoured Division at Verdun until July 1, 1984.
- The regiment participated in two tours in Bosnia with UNPROFOR.
- Artillery Regiment of the 6th Light Armoured Brigade (3rd Division) since July 1, 1999.

=== Campaigns ===
Campaign Participation Engagement
( 1813 - 1918 )

- 1813 : Hanau
- 1844 : Mogador
- 1892 : Dahomey
- 1900 : Tien-Tsin
- 1908 - 1913 : Maroc
- 1915 : Champagne
- 1916 : La Somme

Campaign Participation Engagement
( 1940 - 1991 )

- 1942 : Fezzan
- 1943 : Sud Tunisien
- 1944 : Paris
- 1944 : Strasbourg

Campaign Participation Engagement
( 1991 - 2001 )

- 1991 - 2001 : UNPROFOR

Campaign Participation Engagement
( 2000–Present )

- 2003 : Martinique
- 2003 : Guadeloupe
- 2003 : Djibouti
- 2003: Ivory Coast
- 2004 : Ivory Coast
- 2004 : Tchad
- 2005 : Kosovo
- 2005 : Cameroun
- 2005 : Guyane
- 2005 : Djibouti
- 2006 : Ivory Coast
- 2006 : Polynesia
- 2007 : Djibouti
- 2007 : Cameroun
- 2007 : Tchad
- 2007 : Guadeloupe
- 2007 : Afghanistan
- 2008 : Kosovo
- 2008 : Afghanistan
- 2009 : Afghanistan
- 2009 : Tchad
- 2009 : Central African Republic
- 2010 : Afghanistan
- 2010 : New Caledonia
- 2011 : Afghanistan
- 2011 : Djibouti
- 2011 : Guyane
- 2011 : Martinique
- 2011 : Ivory Coast
- 2011 : Senegal
- 2012 : Tchad
- 2013 : Tchad
- 2013 : Mali
- 2013 : Djibouti
- 2013 : Senegal

== Organization ==
The 3^{e} RAMa is composed of 950 artillery marines articulated in 6 Artillery batteries:

- 1 command and logistics artillery battery
- 2 ground composed artillery batteries equipped with 155mm CAESAR and 120mm type mortars
- 1 Ground-to-Air artillery battery with missiles
- 1 artillery renseignement brigade battery
- 1 artillery intervention reserve battery.

=== Part of Equipment ===
- 120 mm type mortars
- VAB equipped with mortars and 20mm type cannons
- CAESAR

== Traditions ==
=== Insignia ===
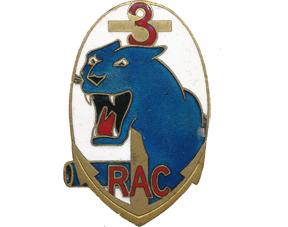
Insignia of the 3^{e} RAC

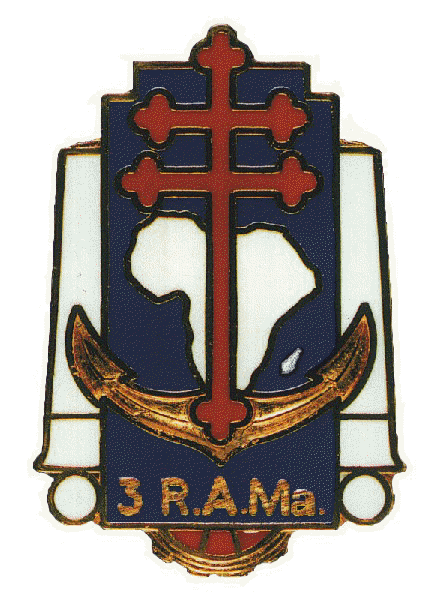
Insignia of the 3^{e} RAMa

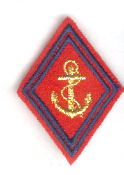
Shoulder Insignia

=== Decorations ===
The Regimental Colors of the 3rd Marine Artillery Regiment 3^{e} RAMa is decorated with:

- Croix de guerre 1914-1918 with:
  - 2 palms (two citations at the orders of the armed forces)
- Croix de guerre 1939-1945 with:
  - 2 palms (two citations at the orders of the armed forces).
- Fourragere with:
  - colors of the croix de guerre 1914-1918 awarded on January 31, 1919 with olive color bearing the attribution of the croix de guerre 1914-1918, then the olive color bearing the attribution of croix de guerre 1939-1945 awarded September 18, 1946
- U.S. Presidential Unit Citation
- Fourragere with :
  - colors of Cross of the Liberation
- Croix de la Valeur militaire with :
  - 1 vermeil star (September 2013)
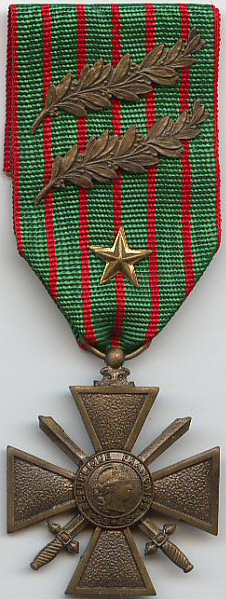
Croix de guerre 1914-1918

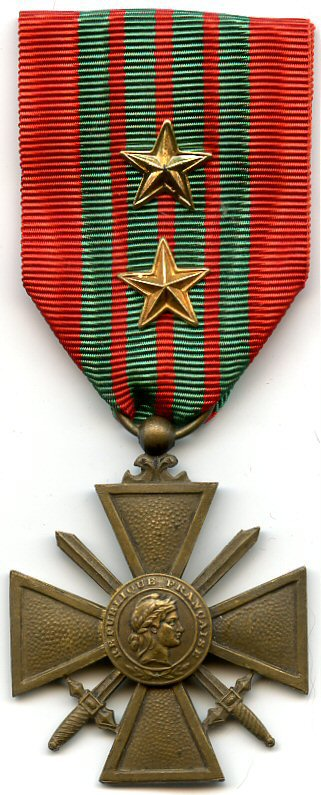
Croix de guerre 1939-1945

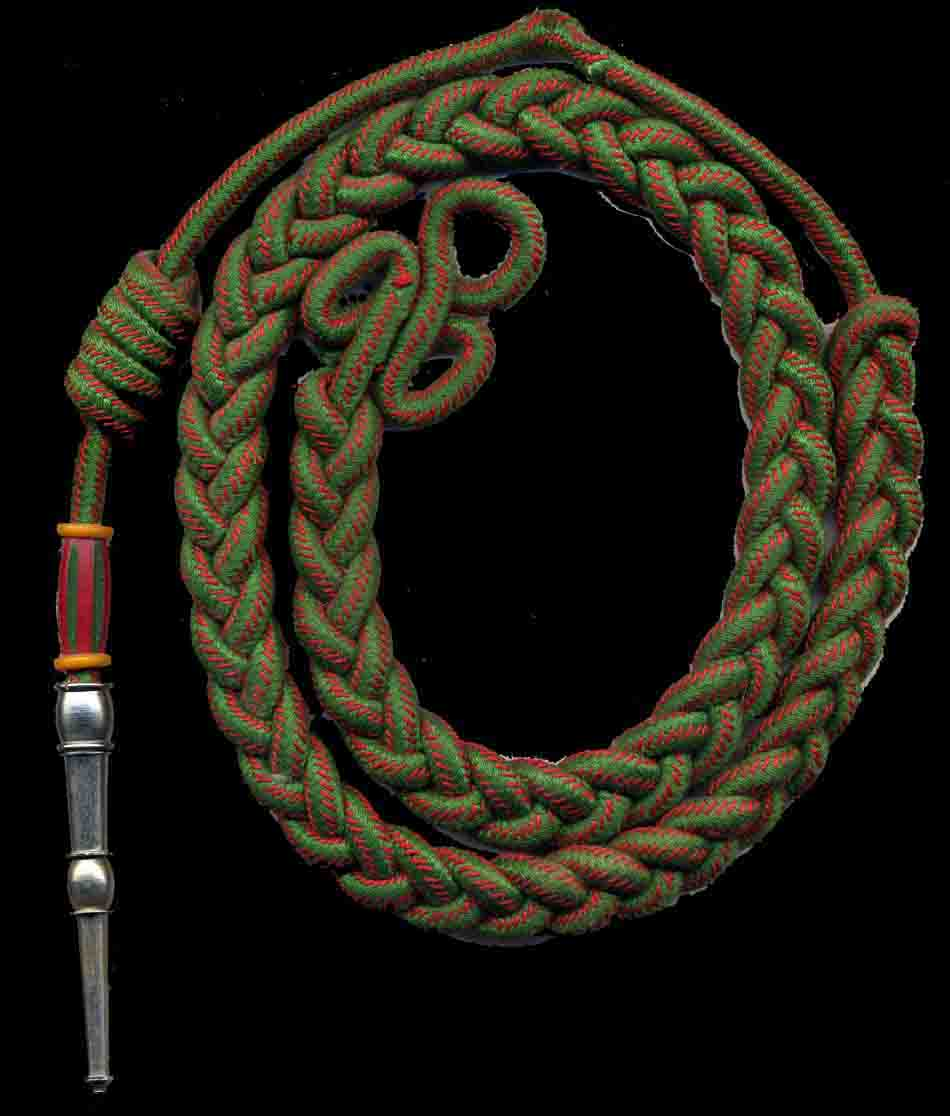
Fourragere with colors of the croix de guerre 1914 1918 with olive color of the croix de guerre 1939 1945

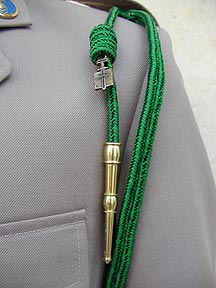
Fourragere with colors of the Ordre de la Libération

U.S. Presidential Unit Citation

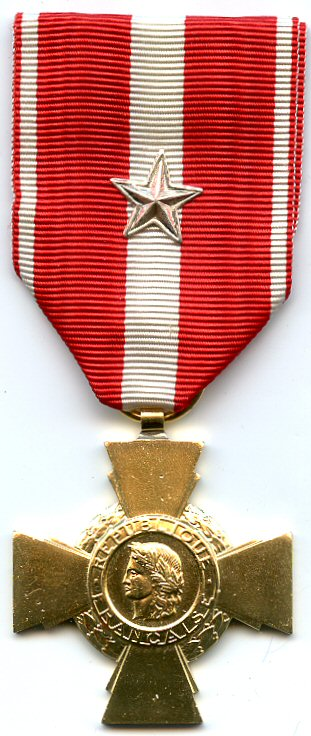
Croix de la Valeur militaire

=== Battle Honours ===
- Hanau 1813
- Mogador 1844
- Dahomey 1892
- Tien-Tsin 1900
- Maroc 1908-1913
- Champagne 1915
- Somme 1916
- La Serre 1918
- Fezzan 1942
- Sud Tunisien 1943
- Paris 1944
- Strasbourg 1944

== Regimental Commanders ==
3rd Marine Artillery Regiment, 3^{e} RAMa

- 1960-1962 : Lieutenant-Colonel Goeury
- 1962-1964 : Colonel Vieil
- 1964-1965 : Colonel Sibiril
- 1965-1967 : Lieutenant-Colonel Legendre
- 1967-1969 : Colonel Pauly
- 1969-1971 : Lieutenant-Colonel Martegoute
- 1971-1973 : Colonel Amoudru
- 1973-1975 : Colonel Delpit
- 1975-1977 : Colonel Laboria
- 1977-1979 : Colonel Allemane
- 1979-1981 : Colonel Nomblot
- 1981-1983 : Lieutenant-Colonel Sandoz
- 1983-1985 : Colonel Soulard
- 1985-1987 : Colonel Cazade
- 1987-1989 : Colonel Jardin
- 1989-1991 : Colonel Baldecchi
- 1991-1993 : Colonel Fernandez
- 1993-1995 : Lieutenant-Colonel Caplain
- 1995-1997 : Lieutenant-Colonel Leplatois
- 1997-1999 : Colonel Jestin
- 1999-2001 : Colonel L'Hostis
- 2001-2003 : Colonel Cuny
- 2003-2005 : Colonel Fournier
- 2005-2007 : Colonel Caiazzo
- 2007-2009 : Colonel Rampal
- 2009-2011 : Colonel Renouard
- 2011-2013 : Colonel Cluzel
- 2013-2014 : Lieutenant-Colonel Reinbold

== See also ==
- Moroccan Division
- 35th Parachute Artillery Regiment

== Sources and bibliography ==
- Erwan Bergot, La coloniale du Rif au Tchad 1925-1980, imprimé en France : décembre 1982, n° d'éditeur 7576, n° d'imprimeur 31129, sur les presses de l'imprimerie Hérissey.
