= African-led International Support Mission to Mali =

Member states of African-led International Support Mission to Mali

The African-led International Support Mission to Mali (AFISMA) was an Economic Community of West African States (ECOWAS) organized military mission sent to support the government of ECOWAS member nation Mali against Islamist rebels in the Northern Mali conflict. The mission was authorized with UN Security Council Resolution 2085, passed on 20 December 2012, which "authorizes the deployment of an African-led International Support Mission in Mali (AFISMA) for an initial period of one year. The AFISMA mission transferred its authority to MINUSMA on 1 July 2013, that is, AFISMA mission ended and MINUSMA mission began, with AFISMA troops becoming MINUSMA troops.

Initially, the mission was to begin in September 2013, but after an unexpected advance by the rebel forces in early January 2013 and the subsequent French intervention, ECOWAS decided to immediately deploy the AFISMA forces. On 17 January, Nigeria began deploying air and ground forces to Mali. The Nigerian deployment was followed by the arrival of a 160-man contingent from Burkina Faso the following week. The first commander of AFISMA is Nigerian Major General Abdulkadir Shehu.

Meanwhile, the heads of state and government of ECOWAS have endorsed Major General Shehu of Nigeria as Force Commander and Brigadier General Yaye Garba of Niger as Deputy Force Commander.

On January 31, the United States Department of State estimated that there were about 1,400 AFISMA troops from Nigeria, Benin, Togo, Senegal, Burkina Faso and Chad on the ground in Mali.

The following forces have been committed to AFISMA:

Country	Personnel	Remarks
Benin	300	
Burkina Faso	500	
Burundi	unknown	
Cape Verde	unknown	
Chad	1,800	
Gabon	900	
Gambia	1 military police platoon and 1 infantry company	
Ghana	120 - Engineer Company	
Guinea	144	
Guinea-Bissau	unknown	
Ivory Coast	500	
Liberia	1 platoon	
Niger	500	
Nigeria	1,200	Reportedly includes elements of 333 Battalion. Also deployed Mi-35 helicopters, and two Nigerian Air Force Alpha Jets.
Rwanda	unknown	
Senegal	500	
Sierra Leone	500	'Maintenance battalion' (Xinhua News Agency)
South Africa	unknown	
Tanzania	unknown	
Togo	500	
Uganda	unknown	
AFISMA Total:	7,464	

== Casualties ==
65 soldiers have been killed during the mission: 34 Chadians, 28 Nigerians, 2 Togolese and 1 Burkinabé.

== See also ==
- United Nations Multidimensional Integrated Stabilization Mission in Mali
