= 31st Brigade (France) =

- 31^{e} Brigade
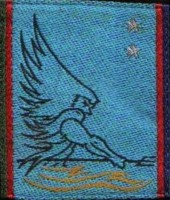
- Insignia of the 31st Brigade featuring Poseidon
- Active: 1 July 1981 – 28 June 1984
- Country: France
- Branch: French Army
- Type: Specialized Armoured Brigade
- Part of: Foreign Legion Groupment
- Garrison/HQ: Bonifacio, Nîmes, Aubagne, Orange, Fréjus
- Motto(s): Honneur et Fidélité
- Colors: Green and Red; Red and Blue
- Engagements: 31st Brigade Lebanese Civil War: Multinational Force in Lebanon

Commanders
- Notable commanders: Général de brigade Paul Lardry (1981–1982); Général de brigade Jean-Claude Coullon (1982–1984)

The 31st Brigade (French: 31^{e} Brigade) was a French Army unit created in 1981 whose components were all reassigned in 1984.

On 1 July 1981 the Chief of Staff of the French Army enacted the creation of an inter-arm brigade placed under the orders and command of the Foreign Legion Groupment (G.L.E), headed by générals Paul Lardry and Jean-Claude Coullon.

== Organization ==
The structure of the 31st Brigade consisted of :

- Command
- 31st Command and Transmission Company
- Operational Group of the Foreign Legion (G.O.L.E.; French: Groupement Opérationnel de la Légion Etrangère) stationed in Bonifacio, Corsica. This was redesignated the 2nd Foreign Infantry Regiment (2^{e} R.E.I) in 1980, and garrisoned at Nîmes.
- 21st Marine Infantry Regiment (21^{e} R.I.M.a)

The brigade benefitted from the support of AMX-30 tank squadrons of the 501e Régiment de chars de combat, (501^{e} R.C.C). The brigade could be reinforced more particularly by the 1st Foreign Cavalry Regiment (1^{er} REC), as well as the 1st Foreign Regiment, and AMX 10 RC squadrons of the 21st Marine Infantry Regiment.

The headquarter staff of the brigade was stationed in Aubagne. The brigade's main mission was peacekeeping operations in Lebanon in 1983 within the Multinational Force in Lebanon. Some of the regiments included the 3rd Marine Infantry Parachute Regiment (3^{e} RPIMa), the 8th Marine Infantry Parachute Regiment (8^{e} RPIMa), the 1st Parachute Hussar Regiment (1^{er} RPH), the 35th Parachute Artillery Regiment (35^{e} RAP) and the 17th Parachute Engineer Regiment (17^{e} RGP), already active in UNIFIL ground operations since 1978.

Général de brigade Jean-Claude Coullon was also in charge of the 2nd Foreign Parachute Regiment (2e REP) in 1982, through the putting-in-place of Operation Épaulard I spearheaded by lieutenant-colonel Bernard Janvier. Général Coullon led and witnessed the transformation of the Foreign Legion Groupment (G.L.E.) to the Foreign Legion Command (C.O.M.L.E) in 1984. He also headed simultaneously the transitional command of the newly established Foreign Legion Command.

From May to September 1983, the 31st Brigade intervened in Lebanon as part of the Multinational Force in Lebanon.

The 31st Brigade was replaced by the 6th Light Armoured Division on 28 June 1984.

== Traditions ==
=== Insignias ===
The insignia of the 31st Brigade is a silver rectangle, bordered to the left by green and red stripes, representing the Legion and bordered to the right by red and blue stripes, representing the Troupes de marine. The top right features two stars representing the brigade. At the bottom left features Poseidon armed with a trident, forming out of a silver wave, recalling the intervention capacity capability of the brigade in any lieu, by maritime including aeronaval, aerial, or other maritime means of displacement. The insignia was realized in July 1981, following a contest at the corps units forming the brigade.

== Brigade commander ==
- 1981 - 1982: Général de brigade Paul Lardy
- 1982 – 1984: Général de brigade Jean-Claude Coullon

== See also ==
- Major (France)
- French Foreign Legion Music Band (MLE)
- Paul Arnaud de Foïard
- Jeannou Lacaze
- Jean Brette
- Maurice Schmitt
- Jean Louis Roué
- Raymond Le Corre
- Bruno Dary
- Benoît Puga
- Édouard Guillaud
- Hervé Charpentier
- Jean-Pierre Bosser
- French aircraft carrier Clemenceau (R98)
- French aircraft carrier Foch (R99)
- 1st Division
- 9th Marine Infantry Brigade
- 3rd Division
- 6th Light Armored Brigade
