= 1st Foreign Cavalry Regiment =

- 1^{e} Régiment étranger de Cavalerie
- Regimental Insignia of 1^{er} REC
- Active: 1921 – present
- Country: France
- Allegiance: 1er REC
- Branch: La Legion Étrangère
- Type: Armoured Cavalry
- Role: Reconnaissance & Fire Support
- Size: ~ 1,000 men
- Part of: 6th Light Armored Brigade; 3rd Division
- Garrison/HQ: Camp de Carpiagne (Bouches-du-Rhône), France
- Nickname: Royal Étranger
- Mottos: Nec pluribus impar A nul autre pareil (To none other equal)
- March: La Colonne (The Column)
- Anniversaries: Camerone Day (30 April), Saint-Georges Day and Christmas
- Engagements: Interwar period: Battle of Messeifre; Battle of Rachaya; World War II: Operation Dragoon; First Indochina War; Algerian War; Lebanese Civil War 1975-1990: Multinational Force 1982-1984; Koweït 1990–1991; Global War on Terrorism (2001-present): War in Afghanistan (1978–present); Operation Enduring Freedom; Afghanistan; Northern Mali conflict

Commanders
- Current commander: Colonel Leinekugel Le Cocq

Insignia
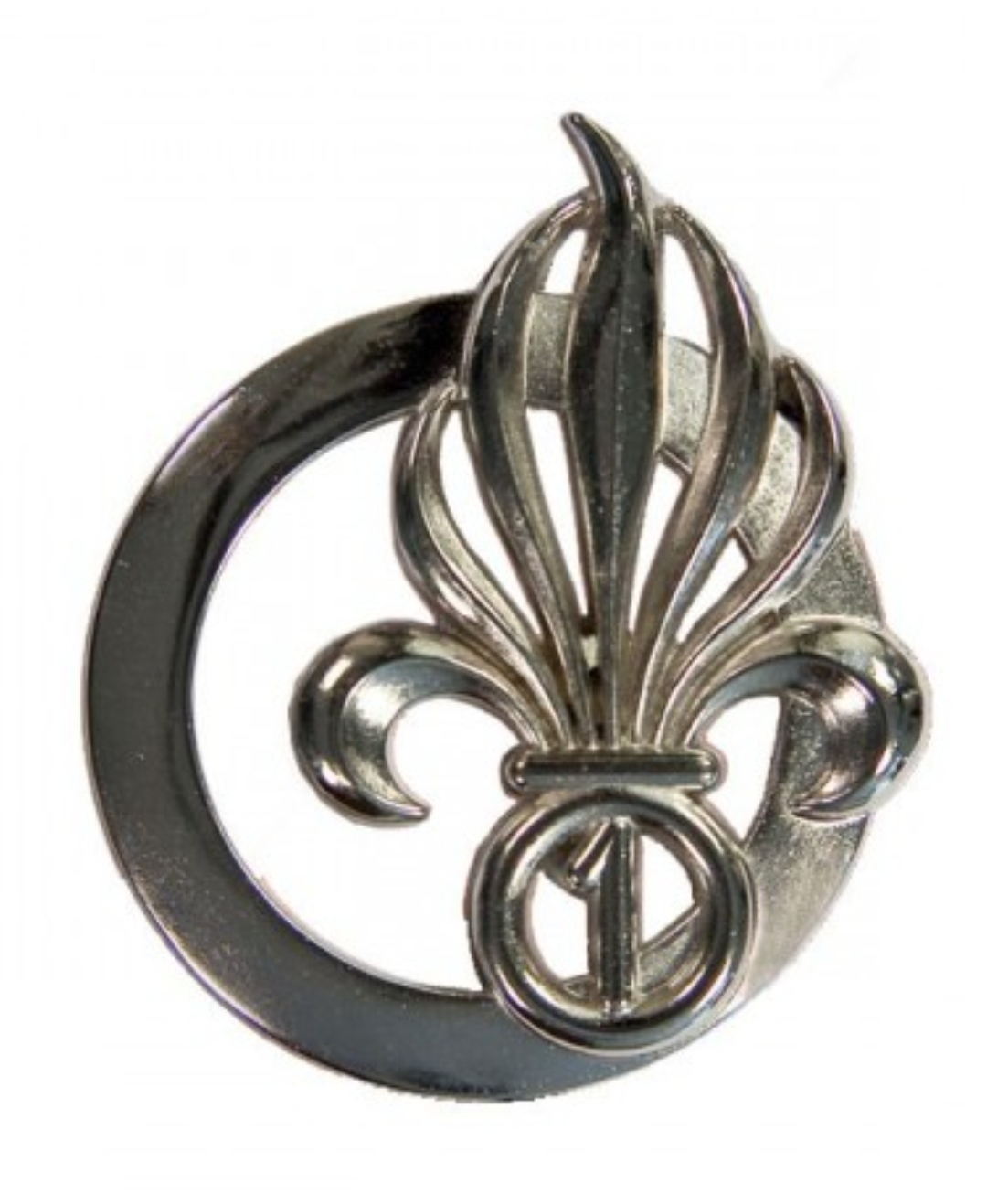
- Insignia
- Abbreviation: 1^{er} REC

The 1st Foreign Cavalry Regiment (French: 1^{er} Régiment Étranger de Cavalerie, 1^{er} REC) is the only cavalry regiment of the Foreign Legion in the French Army. It is one of two armoured cavalry regiments of the 6th Light Armoured Brigade.

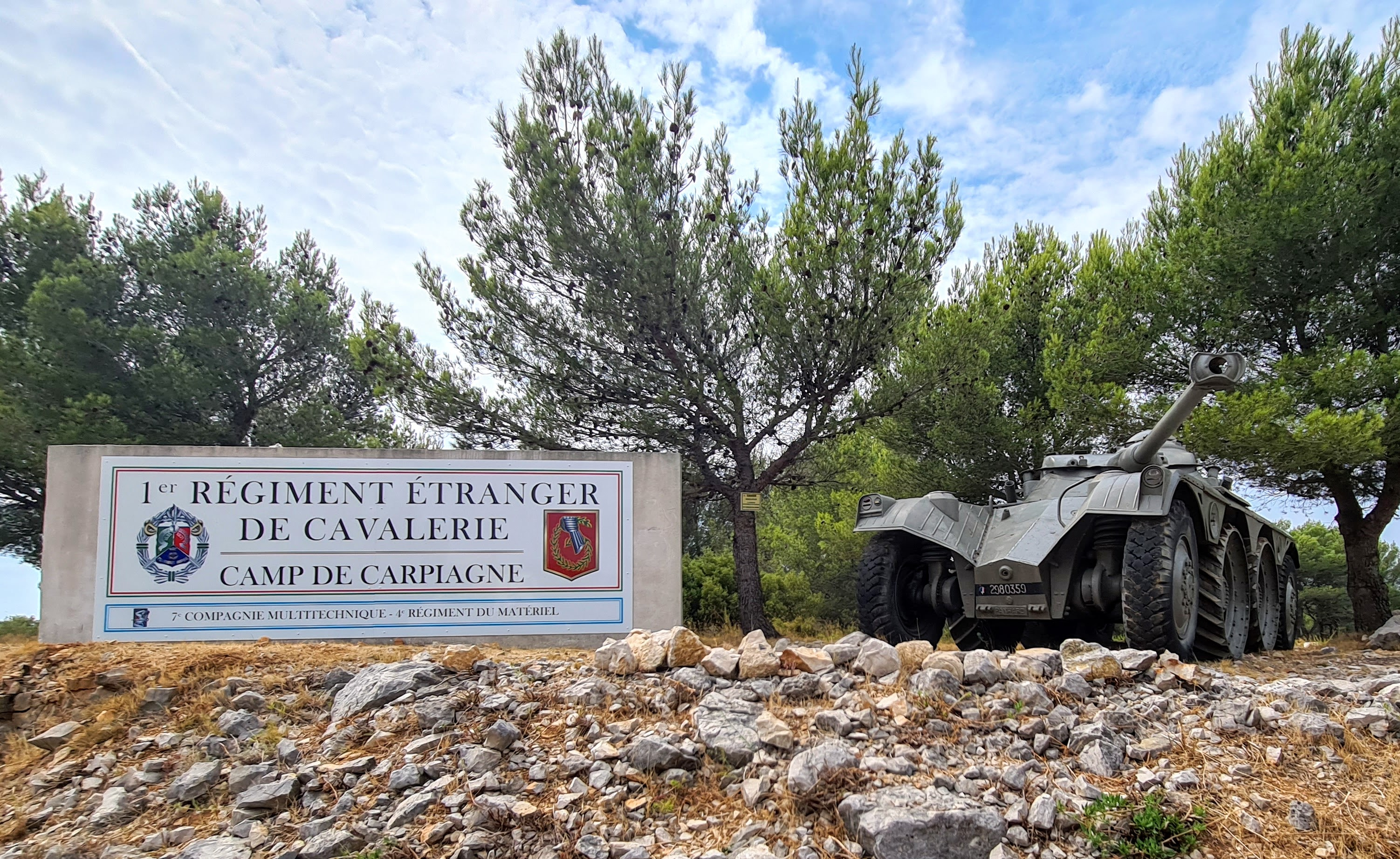
Barracks in Camp de Carpiagne.

The regiment has been stationed at Camp Carpiagne near Marseille since 2014, when it moved from Quartier Labouche in Orange, Vaucluse. It had spent 47 years in Orange after relocating from Mers-el-Kébir, Algeria in October 1967.

== History ==
=== Levant and Morocco from 1921 ===
The 1st Foreign Cavalry Regiment (1^{er} REC) was created on March 8, 1921 at Sousse from elements of the 2nd Foreign Infantry Regiment. The title of the 1^{er} REC would not become official until January 20, 1922, under Decree n°6330-1/11 of January 20, 1922. The cadres of the new unit were drawn from existing French cavalry regiments. Only one junior officer (Second Lieutenant Antraygue) had had previous Legion experience while one non-commissioned officer had been in service with the 1st Foreign Regiment 1^{er} RE.

Of the 156 other ranks of the newly formed 1^{er} REC, 128 were Russians. A significant contingent hailed from the White Army of Wrangle. These included thirty officers (one a former general of the Imperial Russian Army and one a former colonel); 14 non-commissioned officers and 33 Cossacks. Most of the remainder had served as regular cavalrymen with the Wrangle forces. Beginning in 1925, the 1^{er} REC was engaged as mounted cavalry in Syria (4th Squadron ) and in Morocco (3rd Squadron). In both theatres of operations, the Foreign Cavalry Regiment served with distinction, notably in the Levant at Messifre (September 17, 1925) and at Rachaya (from November 20 to 24, 1925). The fanion of the 1^{er} REC received the Croix de guerre des théâtres d'opérations extérieures with 2 palms, the fourragère of the colors of the Croix de Guerre and the 1st Class Lebanese Order of Merit Medal.

From 1927 to 1934, the 1^{er} REC saw active service in Morocco (3rd, 4th, 5th and 6th Squadrons), followed by patrol work along the northern border of the Sahara. In 1934 the 5th squadron was equipped with White-Laffly and Panhard armored cars. The remainder of the regiment retained horses and sabers.

=== World War II and Indochina War ===
In 1939 the two existing regiments of Foreign Cavalry were still only partially motorized. However, in 1940, the 1^{e} REC was dispatched to France as part of the 97th Reconnaissance Group of the Infantry Division (97^{e} GRDI). As such it was engaged in combat from May 18 (at the Somme) until the Armistice. A citation issued at the orders of the Armed Forces praised the heroism of the Legionnaires during this period. Following the Battle of France the 1^{er} REC took up garrison duties in Tunisia. In 1943, the regiment was re-equipped with U.S. material, consisted of one light tank squadron and four armored car squadrons. Its new role was that of divisional recce regiment of the newly raised 5th Armored Division (5^{e} DB).

In 1943, the 1^{er} REC was engaged against the Germans in Tunisia. In 1944, the 1^{er} REC landed on the côtes de Provence as one of the French armored units participating in the Liberation of France. At the end of World War II, the regimental colors were decorated with two new palms and the fourragère of the Croix de Guerre. In 1946, the 1^{er} REC embarked for Indochina. The regimental squadrons plus two autonomes groups (detached units) served for nine years in Cochinchina and Tonkin. Three new citations and the fourragère of the Croix de Guerre of TOE were added to the regimental colors, while the two autonomes groups earned 6 citations.

=== Algeria and the modernization of the Regiment ===
After returning to French North Africa in 1954, the regiment was involved in the Algerian War for eight consecutive years of active service. Following the Évian Accords and the independence of Algeria the 1^{er} REC regrouped at the base of Mers El Kebir. It was then reassigned, on October 17, 1967, to peacetime duty in metropolitan France for the first time.

The 1^{er} REC was now based at Orange in the Quartier Labouche garrison. Reattached to the 14th Infantry Division (14th DI) on January 1, 1976; the 1st Foreign Cavalry Regiment returned to Africa the same year, serving in Djibouti and then Mayotte. In 1978 and 1979, the regiment participated in Opération Tacaud in Tchad where an Army citation was awarded. During this period, the regiment received new equipment, including the FAMAS service rifle, MILAN anti-tank guided missiles, VAB armored personnel carriers, and the AMX-10RC armored car. From May to October 1983, the 1st Foreign Cavalry Regiment served in three separate deployment areas: within the ranks of the Multinational Force in Lebanon; with a tactical command headquarters stationed in Beirut; in Tchad within the combat deployment cadre of Operation Manta; and in Djibouti.

=== Within the ranks of the FAR and Division Daguet ===
The 6th Light Armoured Division (6^{e} DLB) operating the left flank of the 34 nations coalition during the Gulf War.

The 1st Foreign Cavalry Regiment remained within the Force d'Action Rapide (FAR) and was part of the Division Daguet. In July 1984, the Royal étranger was incorporated into the 6th Light Armoured Division (6^{e} D.L.B). Engaged in operation Daguet starting September 15, 1990; the regiment as whole was found complete in the desert of Saudi Arabia on November 6, 1990. Following an initial preparatory phase, the regiment saw service as part of Operation Desert Storm. On February 23, 1991; the regiment crossed the Iraqi frontier, reached its objective at the D'As Salman air base within 36 hours. Victorious, the 1st Foreign Cavalry Regiment intact from personnel or material loss, decorated a new palm on the regimental colors. From December 1992 to June 1993, the regiment served in Cambodia as part of the United Nations peacekeeping force (APRONUC).

=== Operations post 1993 ===
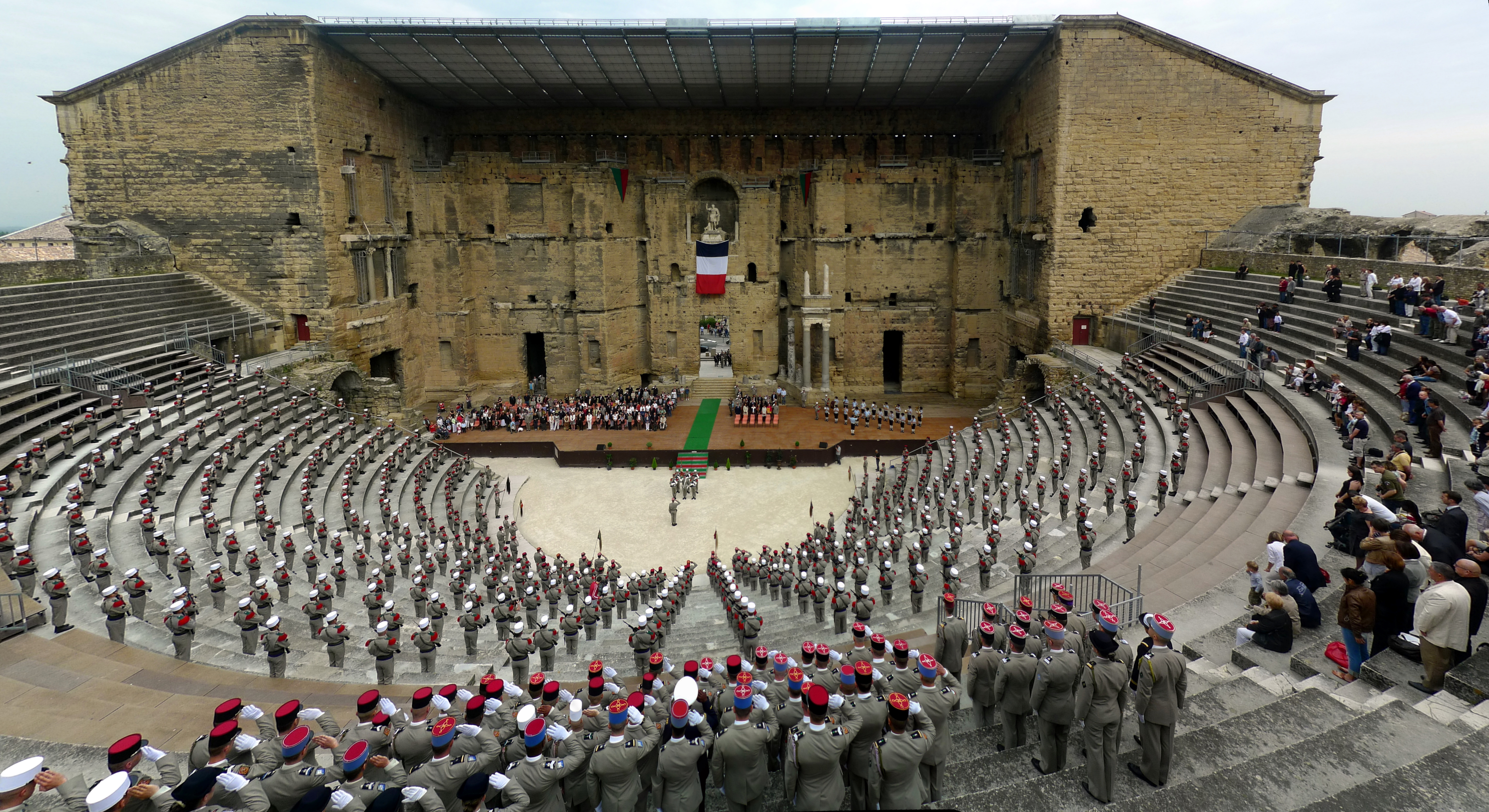
Commemoration of the Battle of Camarón by the 1st Foreign Cavalry Regiment at the Roman Theatre of Orange.

The 2nd Squadron of the Regiment served in Sarajevo as part of the United Nations Protection Force (FORPRONU) from October 1993 to February 1994, and subsequently with the cadre of BATINF from January to June 1995. From 1995 to 1996, the 1st Foreign Cavalry Regiment was engaged in the former Yugoslavia within the cadre of the force de réaction rapide (FRR) and in Chad as part of Opération Épervier. From May to September 1996, the 5th Squadron, recreated in July 1993, was first deployed in the Central Africa Republic during Operation Almandin II. The 1er REC also participated in Guyane, Mayotte and Djibouti. In 1997, the regiment served in the Republic of Congo assisting in the evacuation of refugees. During 1999 the regiment participated in operations with NATO forces in Kosovo, deploying one armored squadron (5^{e} ESC) in the Macedonia, then dispatching the scouting squadron in Kosovo. Since then, the 1st Foreign Cavalry Regiment has participated in Opération Licorne in the Ivory Coast and in (fr) Opération Pamir in Afghanistan.

In January 2013, an AMX 10 RC unit from the regiment was deployed in Mali as part of Operation Serval, to counter an Islamist offensive against the local government and engaged in battle for control of the town of Diabaly.

As of June 2015, with nearly 1,000 men and advanced equipment, the Regiment is on permanent stand-by to undertake any mission being allocated to it.

== Organization ==
The regiment is currently divided into 7 squadrons

- Escadron de Commandement et de Logistique (ECL) – Command and Logistics Squadron.
- 1^{er} Escadron – 1st Squadron (4 combat troops and a command troop)
- 2^{e} Escadron – 2nd Squadron (4 combat troops and a command troop)
- 3^{e} Escadron – 3rd Squadron (4 combat troops and a command troop)
- 5^{e} Escadron – 5th Squadron ( 4 combat troops and a command troop)
- Escadron d'éclairage et d'investigation de brigade (EEI) – Brigade Reconnaissance Squadron. (4 troops)
- Escadron d'Aide à l'Engagement (EAE) – anti-tank squadron

== Equipment ==
Three squadrons are equipped with the AMX 10 RC, a light wheeled armoured vehicle armed with a 105mm gun. The EEI is equipped with the Panhard VBL.

== Traditions ==
=== Insignias ===
Regimental Insignia of the 1st Foreign Cavalry Regiment, 1^{er} REC

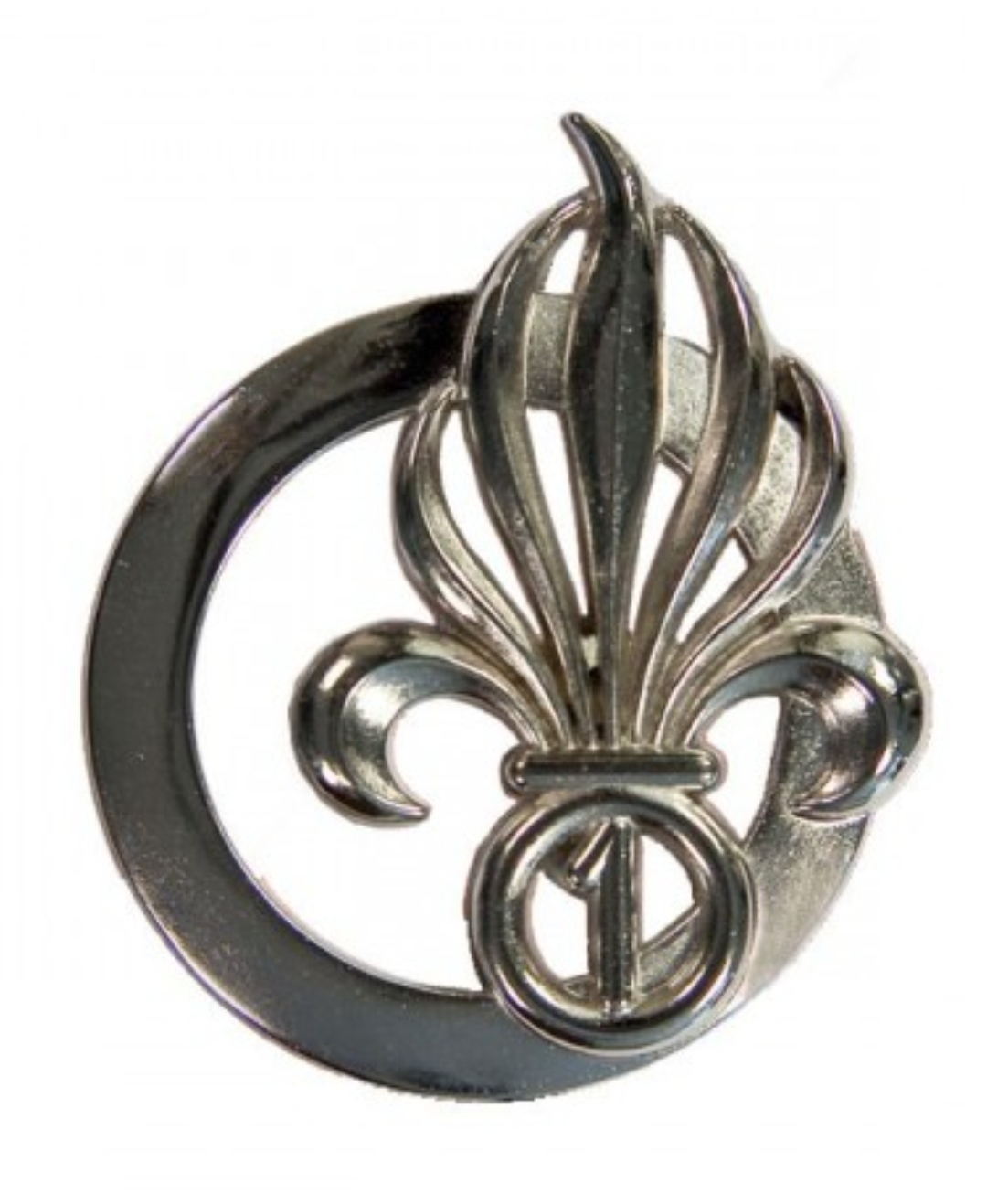
Beret insignia of the 1st Foreign Cavalry Regiment, 1^{er} REC

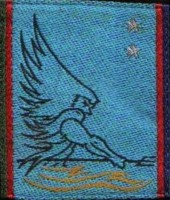
The Foreign Legion Groupment, G.L.E in the 31^{e} Brigade featuring Poseidon

=== Regimental Colors ===
Regimental Colors of the 1st Foreign Cavalry Regiment

=== Decorations ===
- fourragère with ribbon colors of the croix de guerre 1914-1918 with olives of ribbon color of the croix de guerre 1939-1945.
- fourragère with ribbon color of the Croix de guerre des Théâtres d'opérations extérieurs.
- La Croix de guerre 1939-1945 with 3 palms.
- La Croix de guerre des théâtres d'opérations extérieures with 4 palms.
- La Croix de la Valeur militaire with 1 palm.
- 4th squadron decorated November 19, 2012, with Croix de la valeur militaire with palm ( Afghanistan ).
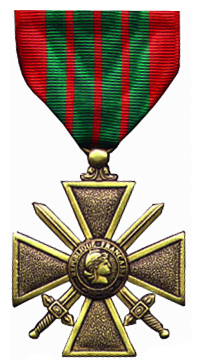
Croix de guerre 39-45

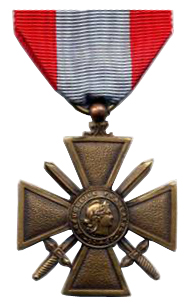
Croix de guerre des théâtres d'opérations extérieures

=== Honors ===
==== Battle Honors ====
- Camerone 1863
- Levant 1925–1926
- Morocco 1925–1927
- Ousseltia 1943
- Colmar 1945
- Stuttgart 1945
- First Indochina War 1947–1954
- AFN 1952–1962
- Koweït 1990-1991

== Regimental Commanders ==
Tenure (1921 - 1939)

- 1921 – 1922 : Colonel Perret
- 1922 – 1923 : Lieutenant Colonel Sala
- 1923 – 1925 : Colonel Maurel
- 1925 – 1931 : Colonel Sala
- 1931 – 1932 : Colonel Burnol
- 1932 – 1935 : Colonel Bonnefous

Tenure (1935 - 1946)

- 1935 – 1940 : Colonel Berger
- 1940 – 1943 : Colonel Levavasseur
- 1943 – 1945 : Colonel Miquel
- 1945 : Major Lennuyeux
- 1945 – 1946 : Colonel Robert
- 1945 – 1946 : Lieutenant Colonel Marion

Tenure (1948 - 1956)

- 1948 – 1949 : Lieutenant Colonel Doré
- 1949 – 1951 : Lieutenant Colonel de Battisti
- 1951 – 1952 : Lieutenant Colonel Royer
- 1952 – 1953 : Lieutenant Colonel Deluc
- 1953 – 1954 : Lieutenant Colonel Hardoin
- 1954 – 1956 : Lieutenant Colonel Coussaud de Massignac

Tenure (1955 - 1975)

- 1956 : Commandant Ogier de Baulny
- 1956 – 1958 : Lieutenant Colonel Spitzer
- 1958 – 1960 : Lieutenant Colonel Hervé Le Barbier de Blignières
- 1960 – 1961 : Lieutenant Colonel de la Chapelle
- 1961 – 1962 : Lieutenant Colonel Barazer de Lannurien
- 1962 – 1963 : Lieutenant Colonel de Monplanet
- 1963 – 1965 : Lieutenant Colonel de Froissard de Broissia
- 1965 – 1967 : Lieutenant Colonel Ansoborlo
- 1967 – 1969 : Lieutenant Colonel Bart
- 1969 – 1971 : Lieutenant Colonel Caillard d'Aillières
- 1971 – 1973 : Lieutenant Colonel Fesneau
- 1973 – 1975 : Lieutenant Colonel Lorho

Tenure (1975 - 1995)

- 1975 – 1977 : Lieutenant Colonel Devouges
- 1977 – 1979 : Lieutenant Colonel Raymond Le Corre
- 1979 – 1981 : Lieutenant Colonel Audemard d'Alançon
- 1981 – 1983 : Lieutenant Colonel de la Presle
- 1983 – 1985 : Lieutenant Colonel Ansart de Lessan
- 1985 – 1987 : Colonel Belloir
- 1987 – 1989 : Colonel Badie
- 1989 – 1991 : Colonel Ivanoff
- 1991 – 1993 : Colonel Yves de Kermabon
- 1993 – 1995 : Colonel Franceschi

Tenure (1995–present)

- 1995 – 1997 : Colonel H. Clément-Bollée
- 1997 – 1999 : Colonel Colas des Francs
- 1999 – 2001 : Colonel Bertrand Clément-Bollée
- 2001 – 2003 : Colonel Yakovlev
- 2003 – 2005 : Colonel de Saint-Chamas
- 2005 – 2007 : Colonel Windeck
- 2007 – 2009 : Colonel Dupont
- 2009 – 2011 : Colonel Gilles Jaron
- 2011 – 2013 : Colonel Jean-Christophe Béchon
- 2013 – 2015 : Lieutenant Colonel Rémi Bouzereau
- 2015 - 2017 : Colonel Valentin Seiler
- 2017 - 2019 : Colonel Olivier Baudet
- 2019 - 2021 : Colonel Meunier
- 2021 - 2023 : Colonel Leinukugel Le Cocq
- 2023 - 2025 : Colonel Dias
- 2025 - present : Colonel Larchet

== See also ==
- Major (France)
- Music of the Foreign Legion (MLE)
- Paul Gardy
- Serge Andolenko
- René Lennuyeux
- Jean Compagnon
- 2nd Foreign Cavalry Regiment
- Armored Train of the Foreign Legion
