= 6th Armoured Division (France) =

The 6th Armoured Division (French: 6^{e} division blindée) was a military formation of the French Army. It was established in 1951, disbanded in 1957; then reformed in 1977, and dissolved in 1984.

== History ==
The 6th Armored Division was created in 1951 at Compiègne. It was the heir to the 6th Cavalry Division (French: 6^{e} Division de cavalerie) of 1914, and the 6th Light Cavalry Division of 1940 (French: 6^{e} Division Légère de Cavalerie). It was disbanded in 1957, but reformed on 1 August 1977 in Strasbourg. The reformed division from 1977 succeeded the 6th Mechanised Brigade of the 7th Armoured Division which existed from February 1, 1963 to July 31, 1977.

The general commanding the new division was also responsible for the 62nd territorial military division. It was about 8,000 strong, with 148 AMX-30 main battle tanks.

The division included:

- 6e régiment de commandement et de soutien (Strasbourg);
- 152nd Infantry Regiment (French: 152e régiment d'infanterie) (Colmar);
- 6th Anti-Tank Company (6e compagnie anti-chars) (Colmar);
- 153e régiment d'infanterie (Mutzig);
- 4th Regiment of Cuirassiers (France) (4e régiment de cuirassiers) (Bitche);
- 6e escadron d'éclairage divisionnaire (Bitche);
- 2nd Dragoon Regiment (Haguenau);
- 12e régiment d'artillerie (Haguenau);
- 9e régiment du génie (Neuf-Brisach).

The division was disbanded on 30 June 1984, and the 6th Light Armoured Division (France) established at Nimes.
