= 6th Light Armoured Brigade =

- 6^{e} Brigade Légère Blindée
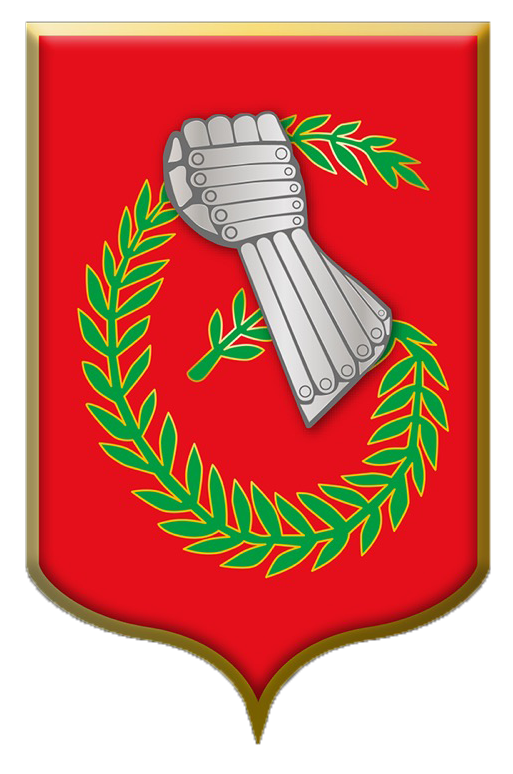
- Active: 6th Light Armoured Division: 1984 - 1999; 6th Light Armoured Brigade: 1 July 1999 – present
- Country: France
- Branch: French Army
- Type: Light Armour Brigade
- Role: Motorised Infantry
- Size: ~7,500
- Part of: 3rd Division
- Garrison/HQ: Nîmes
- Nickname: Division Daguet
- Mottos: Vite, fort et bien ("Swiftly, Powerfully and Well")
- Engagements: 6th Light Armoured Division Koweït 1990–1991; 6th Light Armoured Brigade Global War on Terrorism (2001–present)

The 6th Light Armoured Brigade (French: 6^{e} Brigade Légère Blindée, 6^{e} BLB) is one of the eight inter-arm brigades which are at the disposition of the Commandement des Forces Terrestres. The headquarters of the brigade is situated in Nîmes. The brigade is capable of deploying to any exterior theatre of operation while delivering fire power, agility, and mobility.

== History ==
The brigade is heir to the 6th Cavalry Division (French: 6^{e} Division de cavalerie) of 1914, the 6th Light Cavalry Division of 1940 (French: 6^{e} Division Légère de Cavalerie), and the 6th Armoured Division, stationed in Compiègne (1951-1957) and then in Strasbourg (1977-1984)

In 1984, the formation was reorganised as the 6th Light Armoured Division (6e DLB) and was part of the Rapid Action Force (1984-1999). The division then consisted of 7 regiments, with 5 fully professional ones (i.e. not having within their ranks any citizen doing their mandatory national service), out which 3 were part of the Foreign Legion:

- 21st Marine Infantry Regiment, 21^{e} RIMa, which had been part of the 31st Brigade (1981-1984)
- 68th Artillery Regiment, 68^{e} RA
- 6th Command and Support Regiment, 6^{e} RCS
- 1st Spahi Regiment, 1^{er} RS
- 1st Foreign Cavalry Regiment, 1^{er} REC, attached to the 31st Brigade
- 2nd Foreign Infantry Regiment, 2^{e} REI, a regimental component of the 31st Brigade
- 6th Foreign Engineer Regiment, 6^{e} REG

=== Structure in 2007 ===
Following Army reorganisation in 1999, the division was renamed the 6th Light Armoured Brigade (French: 6^{e} Brigade Légère Blindée, 6^{e} B.L.B). It consists of 6000 service personnel with 2100 wheeled vehicles, and includes 6 regiments and one transmission company:

- 21st Marine Infantry Regiment
- 3rd Marine Artillery Regiment
- 2nd Foreign Infantry Regiment, 2^{e} REI
- 1st Spahi Regiment
- 1st Foreign Cavalry Regiment, 1^{er} REC
- 1st Foreign Engineer Regiment, 1^{er} REG
- 6th Command and Support Regiment

It includes significant numbers of the Foreign Legion and Troupes de Marine.

=== Organization in 2009 ===
Strong with 6000 service personnel, legionnaires and Troupes de Marine the brigade is composed of:

- General H.Q. in Nîmes
- 6th Command and Support Regiment, 6^{e} RCS
- 21st Marine Infantry Regiment, 21^{e} RIMa
- 3rd Marine Artillery Regiment, 3^{e} RAMa
- 2nd Foreign Infantry Regiment, 2^{e} REI
- 1st Foreign Cavalry Regiment, 1^{er} REC
- 1st Foreign Engineer Regiment, 1^{er} REG

=== Organization in 2016 ===
Mostly manned with troops from the Foreign Legion and Troupes de Marine, the brigade is composed of:

- General H.Q. in Nîmes
- 6^{e} Compagnie de Commandement et de Transmissions (6^{e} CCT) - Command and Signals Company in Nîmes with VAB
- 1^{er} Régiment de Spahis – Cavalry Regiment in Valence with AMX 10 RC
- 1^{er} Régiment Etranger de Cavalerie (1^{er} REC) Foreign Legion - Cavalry Regiment in Marseille with AMX 10 RC
- 2^{e} Régiment Etranger d'Infanterie (2^{e} REI) - Foreign Legion Infantry Regiment in Nîmes with VBCI
- 13^{e} Demi Brigade de Légion Etrangère (13^{e} DBLE) - Foreign Legion regiment in La Cavalerie with VAB
- 21^{e} Régiment d'Infanterie de Marine (21^{e} RIMa) - Marine Infantry Regiment in Fréjus with VAB
- 3^{e} Régiment d'Artillerie de Marine (3^{e} RAMa) - Marine Artillery Regiment in Canjuers with TRF1 howitzers, CAESAR self-propelled howitzers and RTF1 mortars
- 1^{er} Régiment Étranger de Génie (1^{er} REG) - Foreign Legion Engineer Regiment in Laudun

== Division & Brigade Commanders ==
=== (1984 - 1999) ===
- 1984 - 1986 : général de division Moreau
- 1986 - 1988 : général de brigade Favreau
- 1988 - 1990 : général de brigade Pincemin
- 1990 - 1991 : général de brigade Mouscardès
- 1991 - 1993 : général de division Bernard Janvier
- 1993 - 1994 : général de division Bâton
- 1994 - 1996 : général de division Rideau
- 1996 - 1999 : général de brigade Schwrdorffer

=== (1999 - present) ===
- 1999 - 2000: général de brigade Barro
- 2000 - 2002: général de brigade de Kermabon
- 2002 – 2004: général de brigade Bruno Dary
- 2006 – 2008: général de brigade Bertrand Clément-Bollée
- 2008 – 2010: général de brigade Eric Margail
- 2010 – 2012: général de brigade Antoine Windeck
- 2012 – 2014: général de brigade Laurent Kolodziej
- 2014 – 2016: général de brigade Pierre Gillet
- 2016 - 2017: général de brigade Benoît Durieux
- 2017 - 2019: général de brigade Franck Nicol
- 2019 - 2021: général de brigade Jean-Christophe Bechon
- 2021 - : général de brigade Eric Ozanne

== See also ==
- French Navy
