= 21st Marine Infantry Regiment =

- 21^{e} Régiment d'Infanterie de Marine
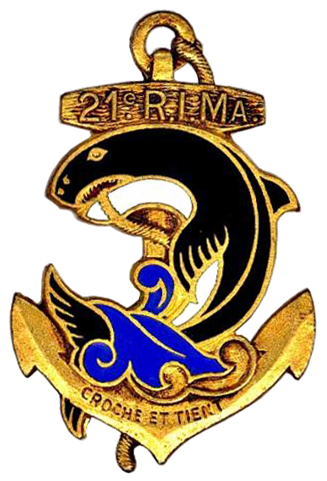
- Regimental insigne
- Active: 1901–1940; 1940–1942; 1942–1955; 1955–present
- Country: France
- Branch: Marine Troops; French Army
- Type: Regiment
- Role: Infantry; Amphibious warfare Urban warfare Close-quarters combat Raiding
- Part of: 31st Brigade (1981–1984) 6th Light Armoured Division (1990–1991); 6th Light Armoured Brigade (1999–present) 3rd Division
- Garrison/HQ: Fréjus, France
- Nickname: Porpoises
- Mottos: Croche et tient (Fr); Hook & hold (Eng)
- Colors: Red and blue
- March: Marche du 21^{e} RIMa
- Anniversaries: Bazeilles
- Engagements: World War I World War II; First Indochina War Algerian War; Lebanese Civil War: United Nations Interim Force in Lebanon; Multinational Force in Lebanon; Gulf War; War on terror (2001–present): War in Afghanistan (2001–present); Operation Serval
- Battle honours: Bomarsund 1854; Saïgon 1859; Puebla 1863; Tuyen Quang 1885; Bataille de Champagne (1914–1915); Bataille de la Somme; L'Aisne 1917; Bataille de la Marne (1918); Colmar 1944; Leimersheim 1945; Indochine 1945–1954; AFN 1952–1962

Insignia
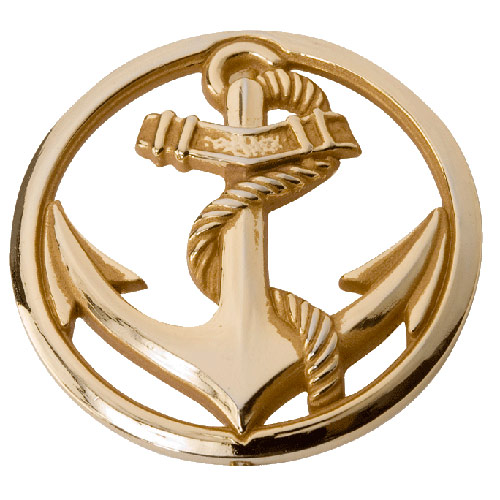
- Beret badge of the Troupes de Marine
- Abbreviation: 21^{e} RIMa

The 21st Marine Infantry Regiment (French: 21^{e} Régiment d'Infanterie de Marine, 21^{e} RIMa) is an infantry regiment of the Troupes de Marine issued by filiation from the 2^{e} RIC.

== Creation and different nominations ==
- 1831: creation of the 2nd Marine Infantry Regiment 2^{e} RIMa (garrison of the 2nd Marine Infantry Regiment).
- 1900: the 2^{e} RIMa was designated 2nd Colonial Infantry Regiment 2^{e} RIC (garrison of the 2nd Colonial Infantry Regiment).
- January 17, 1901: creation of the 21st Colonial Infantry Regiment 21^{e} RIC.
- July 1940: the regiment disappeared.
- September 1, 1940: creation of the 21^{e} RIC within the cadre of the armistice army.
- November 8, 1942: dissolution.
- November 1, 1944: the 4th Senegalese Tirailleurs Regiment 4^{e} RTS was designated as 21^{e} RIC.
- March 22, 1955: dissolution.
- May 16, 1955: creation of the 21^{e} RIC.
- December 1, 1958: the 21 Colonial Infantry Regiment 21^{e} RIC was designated as 21st Marine Infantry Regiment.

== History ==
=== Moroccan Campaign ===
Designated as the 21^{e} RIC on January 17, 1901. A brief passage in Morocco justified the regiment's colonial vocation.

=== World War I ===
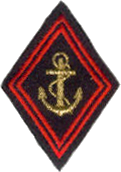
left arm insignia, sou-sofficiers model with anchor of the marine infantry.

In 1914, the regiment garrisoned in Paris and belonged to the 5th colonial brigade of the 3rd Colonial Infantry Division 3^{e} DIC. The 21^{e} RIC was principally engaged Champagne, on the Somme and the Chemin des Dames and was cited in the Order of the Day four times. On November 24, 1918, the regiment was awarded the Fourragere with colors bearing the Médaille militaire.

=== Interwar period ===
Throughout the course of twenty years of peace, the 21^{e} RIC accompanied the 23rd Colonial Infantry Regiment 23^{e} RIC with whom both regiments shared their first experience. Both units maintained a high tempo of training. The two fraternal regiments relay equally the duties of services around the respective garrisons in Paris which revolved around: honorary detachments, parades, award of decorations and national funeral procession of Marshals Joseph Joffre and Ferdinand Foch. From 1920 until 1939, the 21^{e} garrisoned in Paris with the regimental staff and the 2nd Battalion headquartered in Clignancourt, the 1st Battalion in Ivry-sur-Seine then Saint-Denis and the 3rd Battalion at Bicêtre Hospital. Cadres of the regiment retake accordingly the rhythm of deployments in Outre-mer territories. Overseas service postings included the Levant, Madagascar, French West Africa, Algeria, Morocco, China, and missions alongside the Czechoslovak and Polish militaries. During some months as many as thirty officers left the regiment for colonial service.

=== World War II ===
On May 10, 1940, the 21st Colonial Infantry Regiment of colonel Cazeilles was part of the 3rd Colonial Infantry Division which reinforced the under-sector of Montmédy.

==== June 1940 at Villers-en-Argonne ====
In June 1940, the town of Villers-en-Argonne was the scene of fierce fighting and was virtually destroyed by bombing and fire. On 11 and 12 June, the residents were evacuated from Villers as the front line was hard pressed. The men of the 2nd Battalion under Major Varrier were entrenched in an arc around Villers by 13 June, with the rest of the regiment in a line to their east. Their mission was to prevent access to the Forest of Argonne, the road from Villers to Passavant-en-Argonne, and the gap south of Villers, a front three kilometers long. The battalion command post was at Villers. The Regiment as a whole was commanded by Colonel Cazeilles from Montdesir farm (west of Passavant) to the east of Villers.

The unit received reports that German motorized and armored troops were approaching. The 2nd Battalion set up their anti-tank guns (5x 25 mm and 4x75mm) and machine guns in roadblocks around the town. The 6th Senegalese Tirailleurs Regiment 6^{e} RTS had been in contact with the enemy west of Villers in the direction of Braux-Saint-Remy and had retreated, reforming south of the 2nd Battalion positions in woods west of the village. On the morning of June 13, villages to the north, northwest and west of Villers were burning. At 1130, Major Varrier personally conducted two patrols on foot in front of Villers to the village of Ante and another by motorcycle to the Villers railway station (1 km west of the village) at 1330.

At 1430, two German tanks attempted to infiltrate on the left of the battalion in front of the 7th Company (Captain Allegrini) on the Ante road. Both tanks were knocked out by hits from 25 mm guns between 300 m and 200 m from the company's position. A wounded German was captured and his papers passed to the regimental command post. The 1st Battalion, 11th Infantry Regiment of the 35th Infantry Division retreated, passing Villers on its way.

During the evening, the Germans advanced to within 2.5 km. A company, commanded by Captain Marchenoir, of the 18th Light Infantry Battalion of Africa, was made available to Major Varrier on the night of June 13 to 14, to strengthen the western side of Villers. Considering the situation on the spot, Varrier decided to position them facing north and personally positioned the company on the ground intending to avoid encirclement. On the morning of the 14th, enemy movement across the front of the Battalion indicated that contact with enemy infantry was about to occur. Enemy aircraft, flying at low altitude, strafed the positions of the 2nd Battalion and the village of Villers during the morning.

Around 1330, the Germans begin to bombard the village and continued heavy artillery fire until 1500. Despite losses caused by the artillery, the 2nd Battalion remained steady under fire. The first shells were fired at the village, which within a few moments was heavily ablaze and was completely destroyed by the end of the bombardment. German infantry moved behind cover to about 800 m from the village and at 1500, the enemy, singing and shouting, probed the positions of the 2nd Battalion. The main effort occurred west of the village, falling on the 5th Company under Captain Charvet and the 6th Company under Captain Paganel. At the same time, with artillery support, the Germans pushed through the woods, on the flanks of the battalion, pressing on Captain Allegrini's 7th Company in an attempt to encircle its position. The 2nd Battalion received the attack steadily and their rifle, machine gun and grenade fire inflicted severe losses on the attacking infantry.

The Germans renewed their attacks for several hours, with close air support and artillery fire, until 1800. At points during these attacks, elements of the 5th and 6th Companies in the woods were engaged in very close range fights. During these attacks, Major Varrier requested artillery support. A battery of 155 mm howitzers located 9 km behind the battalion were able to give the requested support. Despite calling in target and ranging information on a telephone and only having a 1:50,000 scale map, this fire was effective.

By 1900, the battle was over and the 2nd Battalion was in high spirits and ready to hold its ground. However, Varrier was called to see Colonel Cazeilles at the regimental command post. The colonel expressed his satisfaction and congratulations, but communicated an order of withdrawal at 2130. Returning to his command post, Major Varrier gave the order to withdraw. The withdrawal was made very difficult by continuing contact with the enemy and darkness and was finally accomplished by 0245 on the 15th. After the last units passed, Varrier ordered a Lieutenant of Engineers and four men to come with him and blow the bridge over the Aisne, the Pont aux Vendanges between Villers and Passavant. The bridge was destroyed at 0255.

Following the orders they had received, the 2nd Battalion moved 15 km southeast of Villers and reformed between Triaucourt and Charmontois L'abbé along a 4 km front. The 2nd Battalion and the regiment as a whole were disappointed to have given up the ground they had held in the face of serious attack but their continued movements south were necessary to protect and cover the retreat of other units.

==== Other battles ====
- On June 15, 1940: the regiment disappeared in total along with the regimental commander, Colonel Cazailles.
- On September 1, 1940: recreation of the 21 Infantry Colonial Regiment 21^{e} RIC in the Armitistice Army.
- November 8, 1942: dissolution
- November 1, 1944: the 21^{e} RIC was recreated from the 4th Senegalese Tirailleurs Regiment 4^{e} RTS at the corps of the 9th Colonial Infantry Division 9^{e} DIC, the first army of général Jean de Lattre de Tassigny. Battles included the battles of the Mines de potasse d'Alsace, the Colmar Pocket, the liberation of Ensisheim, of Leimersheim and of Rastatt.
- Général Vial commanded the 1st Company of the 21^{e} RIC from 1944 to 1945. Leading his unit during an attack on Saint-Barbe in Alsace in February 1945, he was severely wounded and lost his sight.
- April 2, 1945, the 21^{e} RIC crossed the River Rhine near Leimersheim (Palatinate).
- The regiment was cited three times, the 21 Colonial Infantry Regiment added to the regiment's fourragere, the olive color of the croix de guerre 1939–1945.

=== Post War ===
- From November 1, 1949, to April 8, 1955, the regiment's status passed to a Marching Battalion of the 21st Colonial Infantry Regiment BM/21^{e} RIC. Following the liberation of France and the Allied invasion, the regiment's battalions served in Indochina where the regiment was recreated in November 1954 from three African marching battalions of the CEFEO. Dissolved again on March 22, 1955, the regiment was recreated on May 16, 1955, as 21^{e} RIC. On December 1, 1958, the regiment was designated as 21 Marine Infantry Regiment in Germany FFA.
- Following campaigns in Indochina from September 1945 to July 1954. Relaying each turn in Cochinchine, in Annam and in Tonkin while cited twice, the regiment was awarded the fourragere with colors of the croix de guerre des théâtres d'opérations extérieures.
- In 1956, the regiment departed to Algeria, partook in the Suez Crisis, then pursued missions in Kabylie until 1962.
- The regiment returned to metropole in 1963 and garrisoned in Aisne.
- Since 1963, the regiment belonged to the 8th Infantry Division until 1980. Garrisoned in Fréjus in 1980, the regiment integrated the 31st Brigade in 1981, which packed squadrons of AMX 10 RC, the 21^{e} was a mixed regiment, the only in France, composed of 2 squadrons of AMX 10 RC, 2 companies of VAB, one Artillery battery, one company of reconnaissance and support VAB, one command company VAB and one instruction company. The regiment composed with the 2nd Foreign Infantry Regiment 2 ^{e} REI, the units of the 31st Brigade. The brigade was dissolved in 1984.

The regiment as well as the museum of the Troupes de marine is garrisoned at Fréjus, the previous garrison of the 4th Marine Infantry Regiment. The regiment is part of the 6th Light Armoured Brigade.

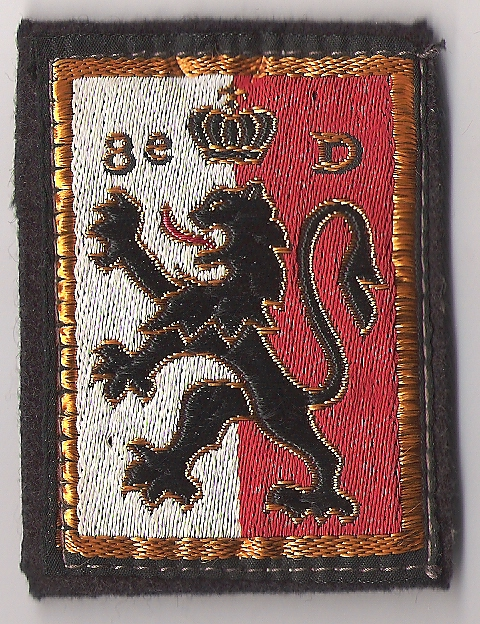
Right arm insignia of the 8th Infantry Division.

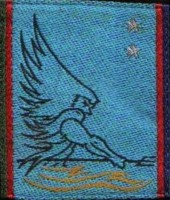
Right arm insignia of the 31st Brigade.

In recent years the 21^{e} RIMa has been engaged in theatres in central-Europe. The regiment was cited at the orders of the brigade for action in Kosovo in 1999. The regiment can be deployed in overseas missions or fill the service of missions in service of the public in metropolitan France. The regiment is the designated guardian of the traditions of the Troupes de Marine.

== Mission ==
The 21st Marine Infantry Regiment (21st RIMa) is a motorised infantry unit equipped with Véhicule de l'Avant Blindé (VAB) armoured personnel carriers. Its principal missions include the defence of French territory and overseas possessions, as well as military interventions in Europe and abroad, with a particular emphasis on amphibious warfare.

=== Foreign Missions ===
For the past 25 years the regiment and its battalions have been widely deployed in the following areas:

- 1979: Chad
- 1980: Gabon
- 1981–83: UNIFIL, Lebanon
- 1984: Operation Manta in Chad
- 1985: Gabon, Bangui
- 1986: New Caledonia, Central African Republic, Chad
- 1987: Chad and Central African Republic
- 1988: New Caledonia, Bangui
- 1989: Gabon, Guyana, Bangui
- 1990: Chad, Gabon, Operation Daguet
- 1991: Gulf War (Division Daguet), Chad, Zaire
- 1992: Rwanda, Gabon, Central African Republic
- 1993: Djibouti, Sarajevo (UNPROFOR), Chad, Gabon, Rwanda
- 1994: Ivory Coast
- 1995: Sarajevo, Former Yugoslavia
- 1996: Former Yugoslavia (IFOR), Central African Republic
- 1997: Central African Republic
- 1998: Chad
- 1999: Macedonia, Kosovo (K-For)
- 2000: Lebanon, Bosnia, Senegal
- 2001: Mitrovica, Kosovo, Senegal
- 2002: Kabul, Mazar-e-Sharif, Afghanistan, Ivory Coast
- 2003: Opération Licorne in Ivory Coast
- 2005: Kosovo, Ivory Coast
- 2006: Ivory Coast, New Caledonia
- 2007: Guyana, Chad, Senegal
- 2008: Chad, Senegal, Kosovo
- 2010: Afghanistan as part of the Operational Mentoring Liaison Team program.
- 2013: Mali as part of Operation Serval
- 2020: Ivory Coast

== Organization ==
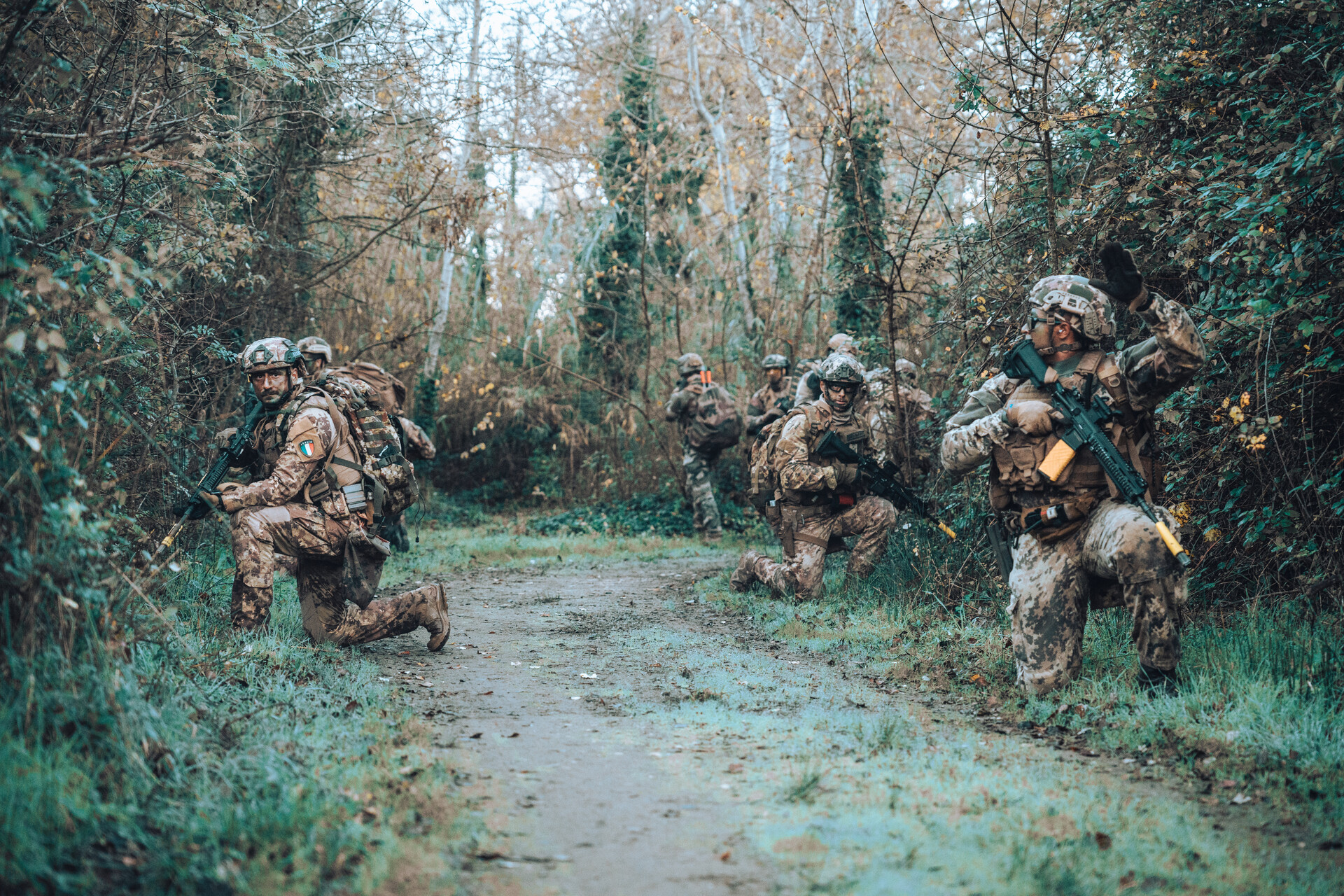
21^{e} Régiment d'Infanterie de Marine and Italian Army Lagunari Regiment "Serenissima" troops during an exercise in France

The 21^{e} RIMa is articulated into eight companies:

- Compagnie de Commandement et de Logistique (CCL) – Command and Logistics Company
- Compagnie d'Eclairage et d'Appui (CEA) – Reconnaissance and Support Company
- 1^{re} Compagnie de Combat (1^{re} Cie) – 1st Combat Company
- 2^{e} Compagnie de Combat (2^{e} Cie) – 2nd Combat Company
- 3^{e} Compagnie de Combat (3^{e} Cie) – 3rd Combat Company
- 4^{e} Compagnie de Combat (4^{e} Cie) – 4th Combat Company
- 5^{e} Compagnie de Combat (5^{e} Cie) – 5th Combat Company
- 6^{e} Compagnie de reserve (6^{e} Cie) – 6th Reserve Company

== Traditions ==
=== The Anniversary of the Troupes de Marine ===
The anniversary is celebrated for combats in Bazeilles, the village which was apprehended and abandoned four consecutive times under orders, respectively on August 31 and September 1, 1870.

Et au Nom de Dieu, vive la coloniale !

In the Name of God, vive la coloniale !

The Marsouins and the Bigors have for Saint, God. This war calling concludes ceremonies which part life in the regiments. Often also at origin as an act of grace to Charles de Foucauld.

=== Motto ===
The motto of the 21^{e} RIMa is "Croche et tient" (Fr) which translates to "Hook and apprehend" (Eng) which defines the regiment's conduit to battle. "Hook", the unit recognizes the enemy, then mounts the assault or amphibious assault to the "apprehend", despite the environment.

=== Slogan ===
"Quand l'aventure est un métier" (Fr) which translates "When adventure is a formal job", a slogan picked by colonel F. Loeillet in 1998.

=== Insignia ===
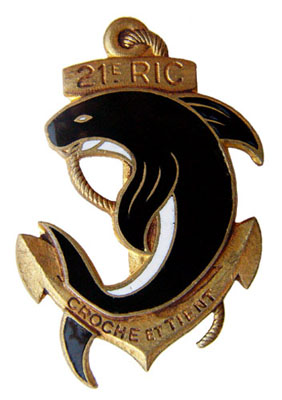
Insignia of the 21^{e} RIC.

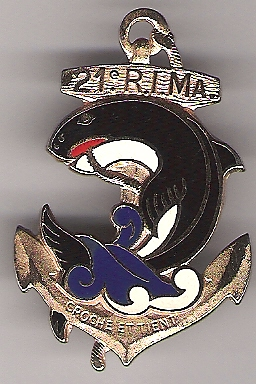
Insignia of the 21^{e} RIMa.

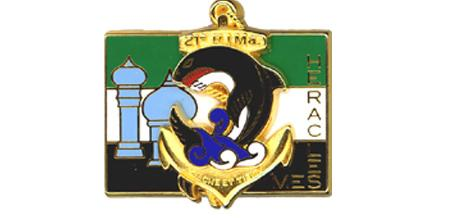
21^{e} RIMa insignia in French task force Héracles.

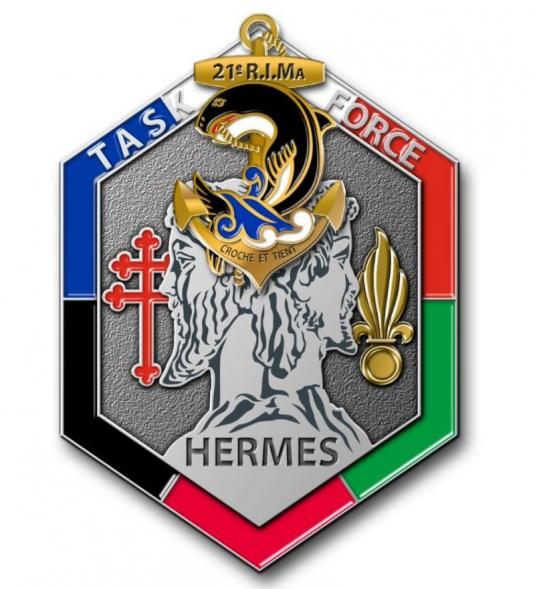
21^{e} RIMa insignia in French task force Hermès.

The surname "Marsouin" was designated to the French Marines in 1856 by the "Marins" of the La Royale.

=== Regimental Colors ===
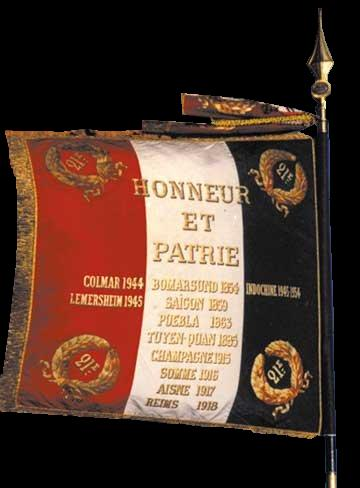
Regimental colors of the 21^{e} RIMa.

=== Decorations ===
The regimental colors of the 21^{e} RIMa is decorated with:

- Croix de Guerre 1914–1918 with
  - 4 palms
- Croix de Guerre 1939–1945 with:
  - 3 palms
- Croix de Guerre of overseas theaters of operation with:
  - 2 palms and 1 star.

Fourragere:

- the fourragere with colors of the Médaille militaire awarded November 24, 1918, with olive colors of the croix de guerre 1914–1918 and croix de guerre 1939–1945 awarded September 18, 1946.
- the fourragere with colors of the croix de guerre des théâtres d'opérations extérieurs awarded on July 12, 1955.
- the fourragere with colors of the croix de la valeur militaire awarded on September 1, 2013.

==== Citations ====
- 4 citations at the orders of the armed forces 1914–1918 (1915, 1917, 1918)
- 3 citations at the orders of the armed forces 1939–1945 (1940, 1944, 1945)
- 2 citations at the orders of the armed forces in Overseas Theaters of Operation Indochina (1948, 1950)
- 1 citations at the orders of the brigade in Kosovo Kosovo (1999)
- 2 citations at the orders of the armed forces in Afghanistan (2001, 2010)
- 1 citation at the orders of the armed forces in Mali (2013)

=== Honours ===
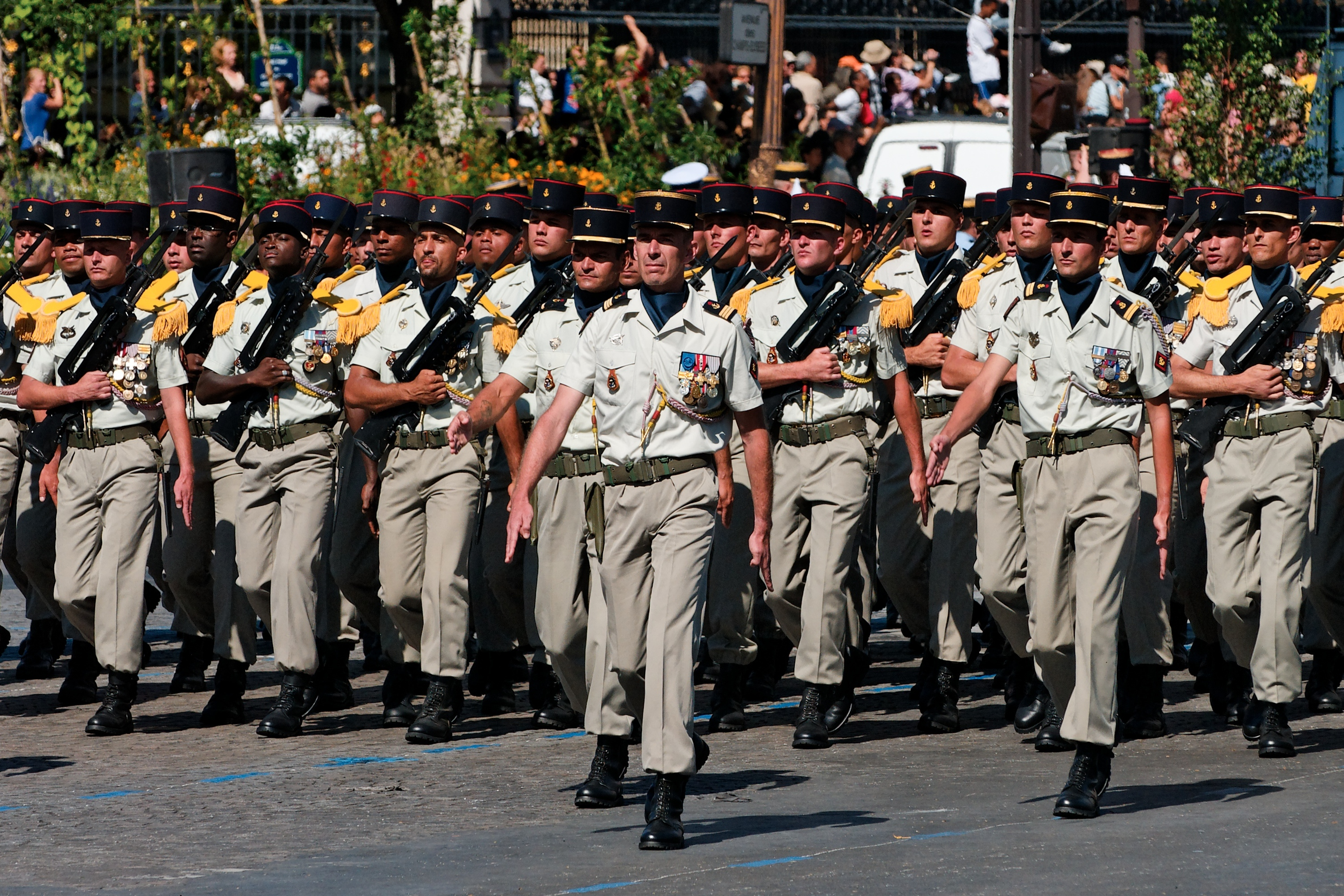
21^{e} RIMa marching during a parade in 2008 in Paris.

==== Battle Honours ====
The regimental colors bear stitched in golden letters in the folds, the following inscriptions:

- Bomarsund 1854
- Saïgon 1859
- Puebla 1863
- Tuyen Quang 1885
- Bataille de Champagne (1914–1915)
- Bataille de la Somme
- L'Aisne 1917
- Bataille de la Marne (1918)
- Colmar 1944
- Leimersheim 1945
- Indochine 1945–1954
- AFN 1952–19626

== Regimental Commanders ==
=== Regimental Commander of the 21^{e} RIMa ===
- 1954–1955: Colonel de Sury d'Aspremont
- 1955–1956: Colonel Rousson
- 1956–1958: Colonel Le Bihan
- 1958–1959: Colonel Lavergne
- 1959–1960: Colonel Deleris
- 1960–1961: Colonel Maillotte
- 1961–1962: Colonel Jacquemin
- 1962–1963: Colonel Foubert
- 1963–1964: Colonel Arnaud
- 1964–1966: Colonel de Luze
- 1966–1968: Colonel Lafaurie
- 1968–1970: Colonel Brasart
- 1970–1972: Colonel Bouttin
- 1972–1974: Colonel Deleume
- 1974–1976: Colonel Cazeneuve
- 1976–1978: Colonel Crespin
- 1978–1980: Colonel Rouvier
- 1980–1982: Colonel Accary
- 1982–1984: Colonel Desmergers
- 1984–1986: Colonel Marchand
- 1986–1988: Colonel Rey
- 1988–1990: Colonel Sonnic
- 1990–1992: Colonel Pellegrini
- 1992–1994: Colonel Tracqui
- 1994–1996: Colonel Bonningues
- 1996–1998: Colonel Boré
- 1998–2000: Colonel Loeuillet
- 2000–2002: Colonel Marill
- 2002–2004: Colonel Castre
- 2004–2006: Colonel Duhau
- 2006–2008: Colonel Collignon
- 2008–2010: Colonel de Mesmay
- 2010–2012: Colonel Jovanovic
- 2012–2014: Colonel Gèze

== Notable servicemen ==
- During 1973, future five-time Tour de France winner Bernard Hinault completed his military service in the regiment.

== See also ==
- French Navy
