= RSAM =

RSAM may refer to:

- Radical SAM, a large collection of enzymes
- Régiment de Soutien Aéromobile, French Regiment
- Random Sequential Access Method, version of storage access method
- Real-time Seismic-Amplitude Measurement
