= Outline of the French Army at the end of the Cold War =

Of the French Army at the end of the Cold War

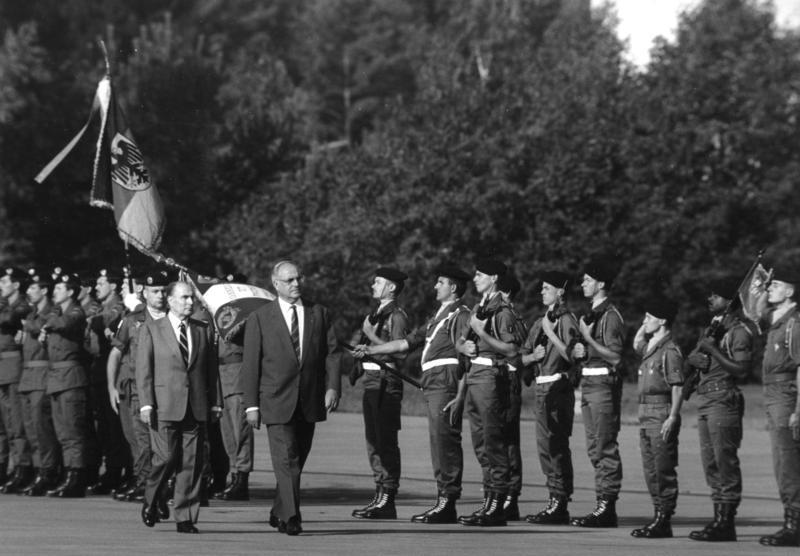
The President of the French Republic François Mitterrand and the Chancellor of the Federal Republic of Germany Helmut Kohl reviewing French troops during maneuvers in West Germany in 1987.

The following is a hierarchical outline for the French Land Army at the end of the Cold War. It is intended to convey the connections and relationships between units and formations. The theoretical combat strength of the army was 295,989 soldiers, of the 557,904 individuals available for service across the entire French Armed Forces in 1989.

In 1967 with the withdrawal of French forces from the NATO Military Command Structure, agreements were reached between the SACEUR at the time, General Lyman Lemnitzer, and the French Chief of Staff, General Charles Ailleret, under which the French forces in Germany might in certain circumstances fight alongside Allied Forces Central Europe.

In 1977 the Army had changed its military organisation in accordance with a short war-fighting strategy in Europe, and divisions lost their component brigades. Under army headquarters in 1985 were the 1st Army, with three corps, the Rapid Action Force, an independent corps-level rapid deployment command, six military regions in the metropole (including the former Défense opérationnelle du territoire territorial defence forces), and forces overseas, including DOM-TOM, in Guyana, Senegal, Côte d'Ivoire, Gabon, Djibouti, Seychelles/Mayotte, New Caledonia, and French Polynesia.

== Regimental structure ==
Below follows a description of the organisation of the various regiments of the French Army.

=== Armored divisions ===
| Type of regiments | Subunits in each regiment | Equipment per company/battery |
|---|---|---|
| Command and Support | one signal company; two transport coys.; one maintenance coy.; one medical coy.; divisional HQ coy. | |
| Armored | 3 OR 4 tank coys.; regimental HQ coy. | 17 tanks (per tank coy.); 2 tanks (in HQ); 53 tanks per tank regiment |
| Mechanized Infantry | 3 mechanized infantry coys.; tank coy.; regimental HQ coy. | AMX-10P; 17 tanks (per tank coy.) |
| Infantry | 3 infantry coys.; regimental HQ coy. | VAB |
| Self-propelled Artillery | 4 artillery batteries; regimental HQ battery | 6 AMX-30 AuF1 |
| Engineer | 3 combat engineer coys.; one civil affairs coy.; regimental HQ coy. | |

=== Light armored divisions ===
The four light armored divisions (6^{e} Division Légère Blindée, 9^{e} Division d'Infanterie de Marine, 12^{e} Division Légère Blindée and 14^{e} Division Légère Blindée) vary in their structure.

| Type of regiments | Subunits in each regiment | Equipment per company/battery |
|---|---|---|
| Command and Support | one signal company; two transport coys. (12th and 14th Divs. only had one transport coy.); one maintenance coy.; one medical coy.; divisional HQ coy. | |
| Reconnaissance | 3 reconnaissance coys.; one anti-tank coy.; regimental HQ coy. | 12 AMX-10RC or ERC-90 (for recon.); 12 VAB/HOT (for AT) |
| Armored | 3 tank coys.; regimental HQ coy. | 17 tanks (per tank coy.) |
| Infantry | 4 infantry coys.; regimental HQ coy. | VAB |
| Artillery | 3 artillery batteries; regimental HQ battery; The 6th and 9th Divs. artillery regiments also field one air defence artillery battery. | 6 M50 |
| Engineer | 3 combat engineer coys.; regimental HQ coy. | |

=== Infantry divisions ===
| Type of regiments | Subunits in each regiment | Equipment per company/battery |
|---|---|---|
| Command and Support | one signal company; two transport coys.; one maintenance coy.; one medical coy.; divisional HQ coy. | |
| Reconnaissance | 3 reconnaissance coys.; one anti-tank coy.; regimental HQ coy. | 12 AMX-10RC (for recon.); 12 VAB/HOT (for AT) |
| Infantry | 3 infantry coys.; regimental HQ coy. | VAB |
| Artillery | 4 artillery batteries; regimental HQ battery | 6 M50 |
| Engineer | 3 combat engineer coys.; regimental HQ coy. | |

== General Staff of the Army ==
French Army Corps and division locations 1989

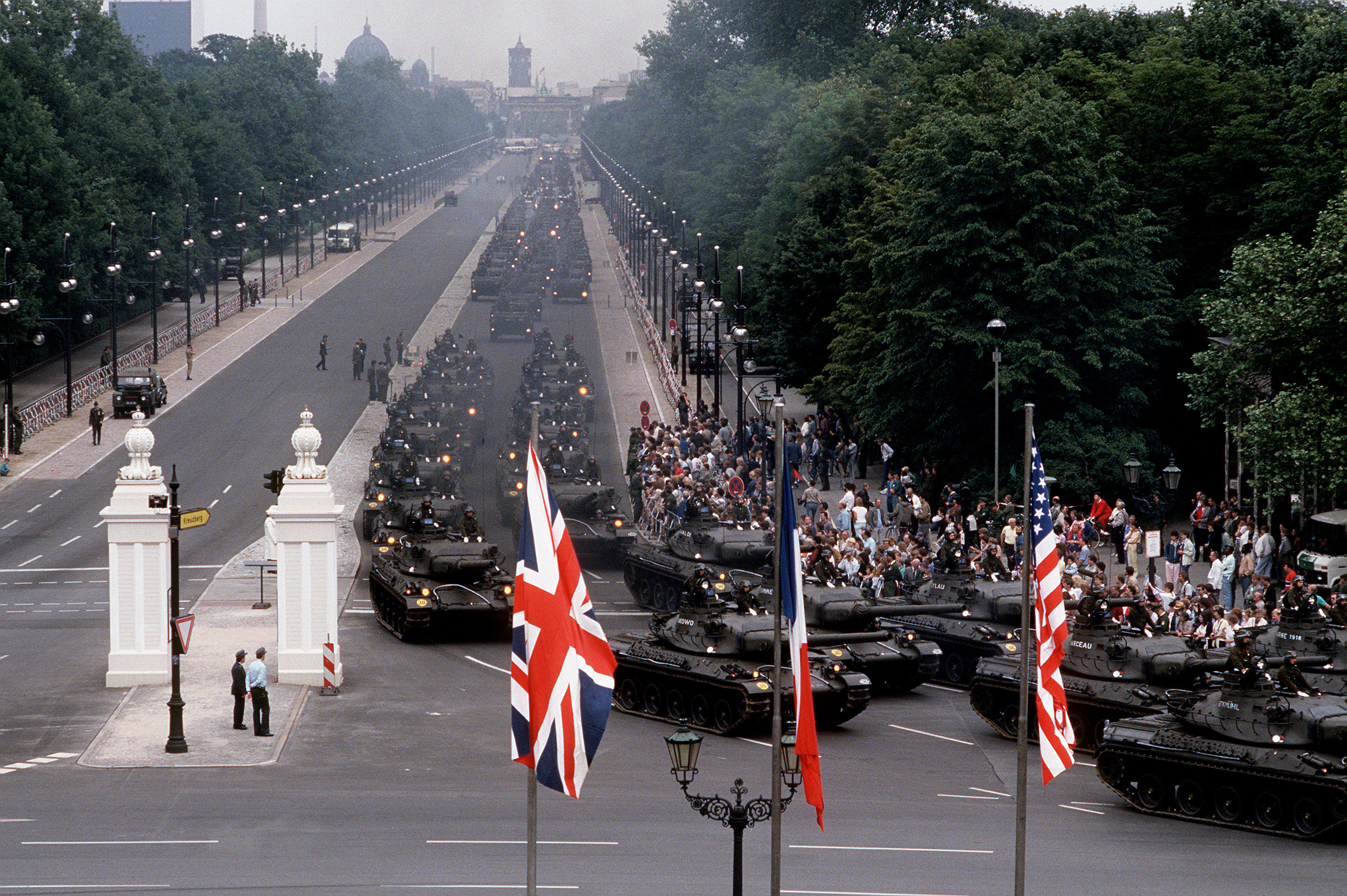
AMX-30 of 11ème Régiment de Chasseurs in West Berlin. 11 June 1988.

- General Staff of the Army, (État-major de l’Armée de terre), Vincennes, France
  - 24^{e} Régiment d'Infanterie (24^{e} RI), Vincennes
  - 8^{e} Régiment de Transmission (8^{e} RT), Vincennes
  - 41^{e} Régiment de Transmission (41^{e} RT), Suresnes
  - 1^{er} Régiment du Train (1^{er} RT), Vincennes
  - Escadrille d’hélicoptères légère de l'État-major de l’armée de terre, Les Mureaux
  - Forces Françaises à Berlin, Berlin
    - 11^{e} Régiment de Chasseurs (11^{e} RCh) (41× AMX-30B)
    - 46^{e} Régiment d'Infanterie (46^{e} RI) (63× VAB)
    - 110^{e} Compagnie du Génie (110e CG)

=== First French Army ===
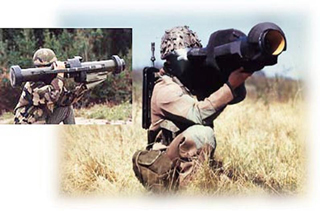
A French soldier ready to fire an APILAS.

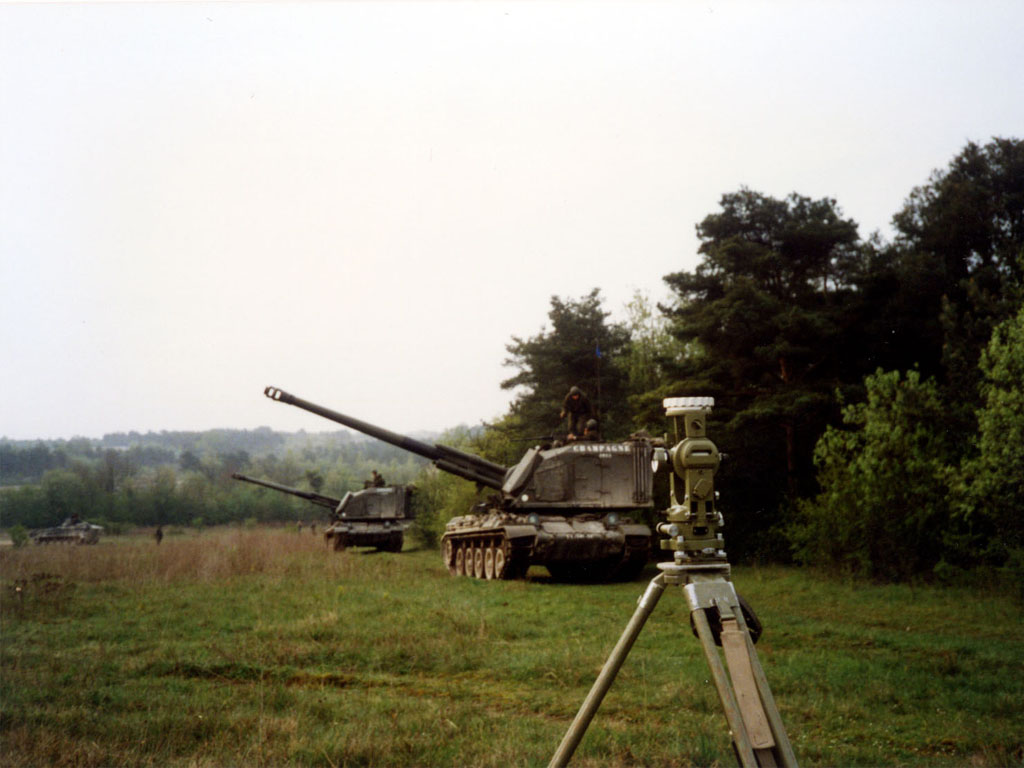
AMX-30 AuF1 in position, April 1989.

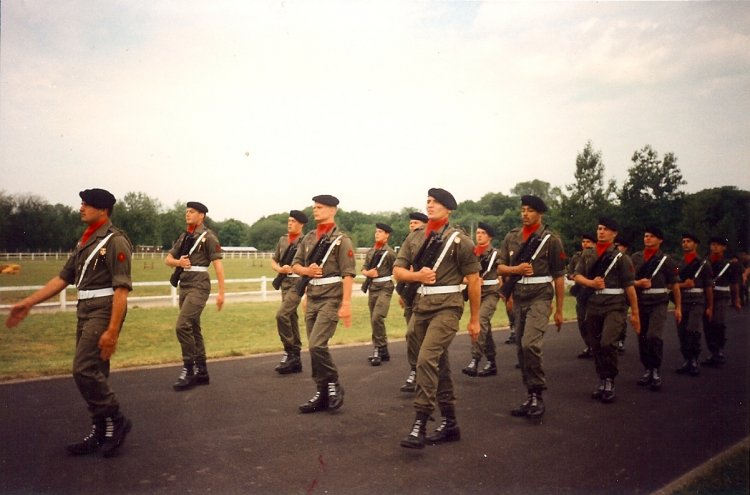
A battery from the 3rd Artillery Regiment at Camp Mailly on parade in 1989. They are armed with a rifle FAMAS.

- First French Army, (1^{re} Armée), Strasbourg, France
  - 13^{e} Régiment de Dragons Parachutistes (13^{e} RDP), Dieuze (Long Range Reconnaissance/Special Forces)
  - 6^{e} Régiment d'Artillerie (6^{e} RA), Phalsbourg (16× RASIT)
  - 7^{e} Régiment d'Artillerie (7^{e} RA), Nevers (with CL-89 drones)
  - 401^{e} Régiment d'Artillerie (401^{e} RA), Draguignan, Air defence training (24× I-Hawk launchers, 8× Roland missile systems)
  - 402^{e} Régiment d'Artillerie (402^{e} RA), Châlons-sur-Marne (24× I-Hawk launchers)
  - 403^{e} Régiment d'Artillerie (403^{e} RA), Quartier Général d'Aboville, Chaumont (24× I-Hawk launchers)
  - 12^{e} Régiment du Génie (Réserve) (12^{e} RG), Neubourg
  - 16^{e} Régiment du Génie (Réserve) (16^{e} RG), Mulhouse
  - 40^{e} Régiment de Transmission (40^{e} RT), Thionville
  - 44^{e} Régiment de Transmission (44^{e} RT), Landau, FRG (Electronic Warfare)
  - 54^{e} Régiment de Transmission (54^{e} RT), Haguenau (Electronic Warfare)
  - Groupe Géographique/28^{e} Régiment d'Artillerie (28^{e} RA), Joigny
  - 83^{e} Bataillon des engins fluviaux du Génie, Kehl
  - Escadrille d’hélicoptères légère de la 1^{re} Armée, Baden-Baden

==== I French Corps ====
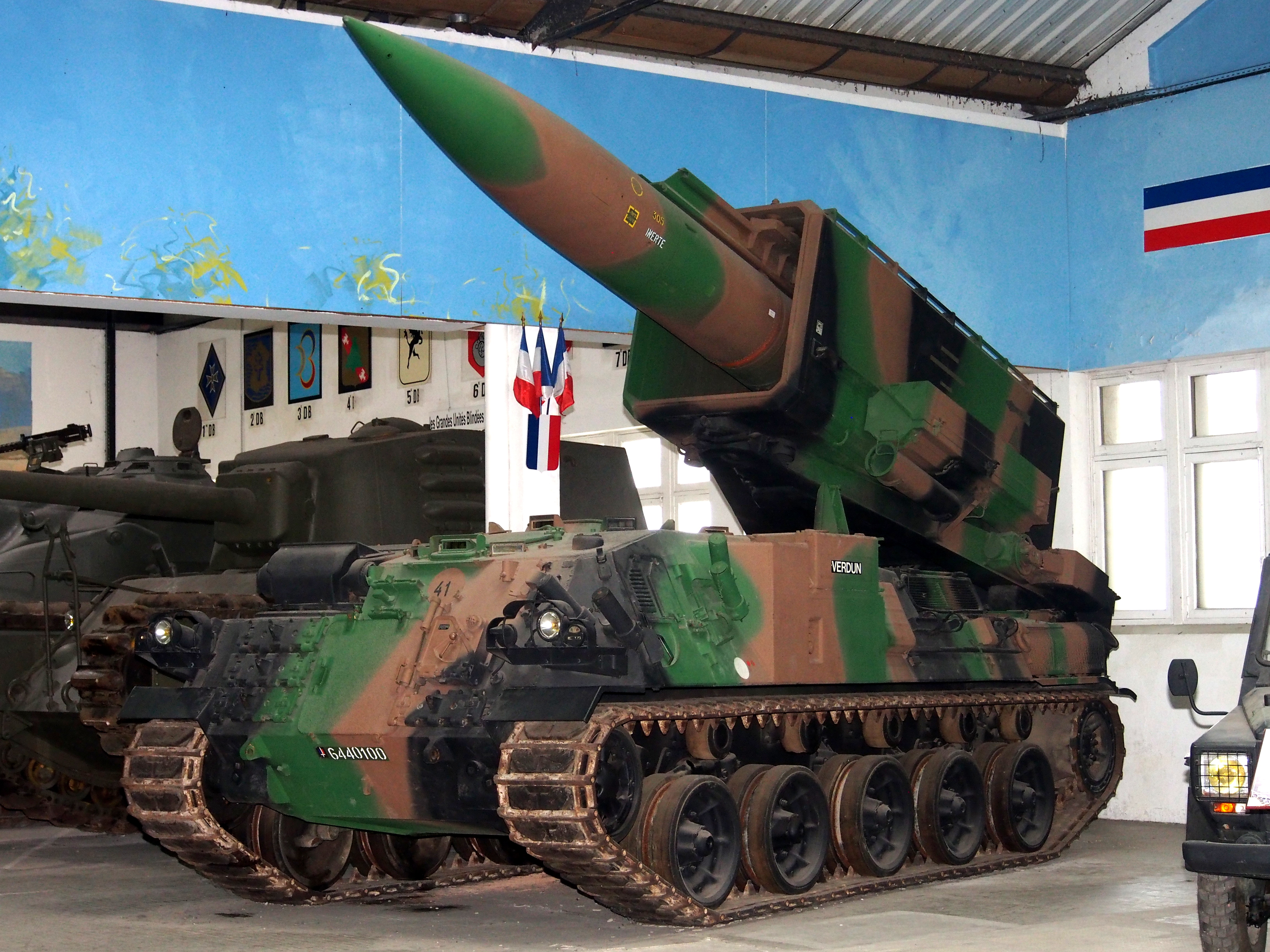
One AMX-30 Pluton. A tactical nuclear weapon with a maximum range of 120 km and a power of 25 kt In service from 1974 to 1993.

- I French Corps, 1^{er} Corps d'armée (1^{er} CA), Metz, France
  - 8^{e} Régiment de Hussards (8^{e} RH), Altkirch (36× AMX-10RC, 24× MILAN)
  - 1^{er} Régiment du Génie (1^{er} RG), Illkirch-Graffenstaden
  - 2^{e} Régiment du Génie (2^{e} RG), Metz
  - 7^{e} Régiment d'Helicopteres de Combat (7^{e} RHC), Essey-lès-Nancy, (16× Gazelle/HOT, 8× Alouette III, 8× SA330 Puma)
  - 18^{e} Régiment de Transmission (18^{e} RT), Épinal
  - 57^{e} Régiment de Transmission (57^{e} RT), Mulhouse
  - 602^{e} Régiment de Circulation Routière (602^{e} RCR), Dijon
  - 619^{e} Régiment de Circulation Routière (Reserve) (619^{e} RCR), Dôle
  - 11^{e} Groupe d’Hélicoptères Légers (Réserve) (11^{e} GHL), Essey-lès-Nancy
  - 39^{e} Escadron d'Artillerie de Corps d'Armée (39^{e} EACA), Metz
  - Commandement de l'Artillerie du 1er Corps
    - 3^{e} Régiment d'Artillerie (3^{e} RA), Mailly (6× Pluton launchers)
    - 15^{e} Régiment d'Artillerie (15^{e} RA), Suippes (6× Pluton launchers)
    - 25^{e} Régiment d'Artillerie (25^{e} RA), (Réserve), Saint-Avold (24× M50)
    - 47^{e} Régiment d'Artillerie (47^{e} RA), (Réserve), Héricourt (24× M50)
    - 57^{e} Régiment d'Artillerie (57^{e} RA), Bitche (24× Roland missile systems mounted on AMX-30)
    - 601^{e} Régiment NBC (Réserve), Metz
    - Batterie d'Artillerie du 1er Corps d'Armée, (BACA 1) Metz
  - Brigade Logistique du 1er Corps
    - 508^{e} Régiment du Train (508^{e} RT), Chaumont
    - 516^{e} Régiment du Train (516^{e} RT), Toul
    - 1^{er} Régiment du Matériel (1^{er} RMAT), Sarrebourg
    - 5^{e} Régiment du Matériel (5^{e} RMAT), Strasbourg
    - 8^{e} Régiment du Matériel (8^{e} RMAT), Verdun
    - 21^{e} Bataillon du Matériel (21^{e} BMAT), Mailly
    - 711^{e} Compagnie mixte des Essences (711^{e} CME), Langres (Fuel Supply Company)
    - 766^{e} Compagnie mixte des Essences (Réserve) (766^{e} CME), Langres
    - 11^{e} Compagnie Médicale, Sedan
    - 612^{e} Compagnie de Ravitaillement (Réserve), Vitry-le-François (Medical Supply Company)
    - 613^{e} Compagnie de Ravitaillement (Réserve), Vitry-le-François

===== 1^{ère} Division Blindée =====
- 1^{ère} Division Blindée (1^{ère} DB), Trier, FRG
  - 1^{er} Régiment de Commandement et de Soutien (1^{er} RCS), Trier
  - 1^{er} Régiment de Cuirassiers (1^{er} RC), Sankt Wendel (70× AMX-30B2)
  - 6^{e} Régiment de Dragons (6^{e} RD), Saarburg, Germany (70× AMX-30B2)
  - 8^{e} Groupe de Chasseurs (8^{e} GC), Wittlich (16× AMX-30B, 51× AMX-10P)
  - 16^{e} Groupe de Chasseurs (16^{e} GC), Saarburg, Germany (16× AMX-30B, 51× AMX-10P)
  - 153^{e} Régiment d'Infanterie (153^{e} RI), Mutzig (70× VAB)
  - 9^{e} Régiment d'Artillerie de Marine (9^{e} RAMa), Trier (20× AMX-30 AuF1)
  - 61^{e} Régiment d'Artillerie (61^{e} RA), Morhange (20× AMX-30 AuF1)
  - 13^{e} Régiment du Génie (13^{e} RG), Trier
  - 1^{er} Escadron d'Éclairage Divisionnaire (1^{er} EED), Sankt Wendel
  - 1^{re} Compagnie Antichar (1^{re} CAC), Mutzig (12× VAB/HOT)

===== 7^{e} Division Blindée =====
- 7^{e} Division Blindée, (7^{e} DB), Besançon
  - 7^{e} Régiment de Commandement et de Soutien (7^{e} RCS), Besançon
  - 1^{er} Régiment de Dragons (1^{er} RD), Lure (53× AMX-30B2, 11× AMX-10P)
  - 3^{e} Régiment de Cuirassiers (3^{e} RC), Chenevières (53× AMX-30B2, 11× AMX-10P)
  - 5^{e} Régiment de Dragons (5^{e} RD), Valdahon (53× AMX-30B2, 11× AMX-10P)
  - 30^{e} Groupe de Chasseurs (30^{e} GC), Lunéville (17× AMX-30B2, 39× AMX-10P)
  - 35^{e} Régiment d'Infanterie (35^{e} RI), Belfort (17× AMX-30B2, 39× AMX-10P)
  - 170^{e} Régiment d'Infanterie (170^{e} RI), Épinal (70× VAB)
  - 1^{er} Régiment d'Artillerie (1^{er} RA), Montbéliard (24× AMX-30 AuF1)
  - 60^{e} Régiment d'Artillerie (60^{e} RA), Canjuers (24× AMX-30 AuF1)
  - 19^{e} Régiment du Génie (19^{e} RG), Besançon
  - 7^{e} Escadron d'Éclairage Divisionnaire (7^{e} EED), Valdahon
  - 7^{e} Compagnie Antichar (7^{e} CAC), Lunéville (12× VAB/HOT)

===== 12^{e} Division Légère Blindée Ecole =====
- 12^{e} Division Légère Blindée Ecole, (12^{e} DLBE), Saumur Cavalry School, training brigade stationed in the West of France
  - 12^{e} Régiment de Commandement et de Soutien (12^{e} RCS), Tours
  - 507^{e} Régiment Chars de Combat (507^{e} RCC), Fontevraud (53× AMX-30B2)
  - 3^{e} Régiment de Chasseurs (3^{e} RCh), Fontevraud (36× ERC-90, 12× VAB/HOT)
  - 3^{e} Régiment de Chasseurs Parachutistes (3^{e} RCP), Pau (Light Infantry)
  - 114^{e} Régiment d'Infanterie (114^{e} RI), Saint-Maixent-l'École (17× AMX-30B2, 39× AMX-10P)
  - 33^{e} Régiment d'Artillerie (Réserve) (33^{e} RA), Poitiers (24× M50)
  - 14^{e} Régiment du Génie (Réserve) (14^{e} RG), Angers

===== 14^{e} Division Légère Blindée Ecole =====
- 14^{e} Division Légère Blindée Ecole, (14^{e} DLBE), Montpellier, training brigade stationed in the South of France
  - 81^{e} Régiment d'Infanterie (81^{e} RI), Montpellier (acts as Régiment de Commandement et de Soutien for the division)
  - 11^{e} Régiment Cuirassiers (11^{e} RC), Aubagne (53× AMX-30B2)
  - 1^{er} Régiment de Chasseurs (1^{er} RCh), Canjuers (36× AMX-10RC, 12× VAB/HOT)
  - 4^{e} Régiment Étranger d'Infanterie (4^{e} REI), Castelnaudary (Light Infantry)
  - 3^{e} Régiment d'Infanterie (3^{e} RI), Nîmes (17× AMX-30B2, 39× AMX-10P)
  - 13^{e} Régiment d'Artillerie (Réserve) (13^{e} RA), Draguignan (24× M50)
  - 4^{e} Régiment du Génie (4^{e} RG), La Valbonne

==== II French Corps ====
- II French Corps, 2^{e} Corps d'armée (2^{e} CA), Baden-Baden, FRG
  - 3^{e} Régiment de Hussards (3^{e} RH), Pforzheim (36× AMX-10RC, 12× VAB/HOT)
  - 10^{e} Régiment du Génie (10^{e} RG), Spire
  - 11^{e} Régiment du Génie (11^{e} RG), Rastatt
  - 2^{e} Régiment d'Helicopteres de Combat (2^{e} RHC), Friedrichshafen (30× Gazelle/HOT, 19× Alouette III, 11× Cougar)
  - 42^{e} Régiment de Transmission (42^{e} RT), Rastatt
  - 53^{e} Régiment de Transmission (53^{e} RT), Freiburg
  - 601^{e} Régiment de Circulation Routière (601^{e} RCR), Achern
  - 680^{e} Régiment de Circulation Routière (Réserve), (680^{e} RCR), Achern
  - 12^{e} Groupe d’Hélicoptères Légers (12^{e} GHL), Föhren
  - Commandement de l'Artillerie du 2^{e} Corps
    - 12^{e} Régiment d'Artillerie (12^{e} RA), Oberhoffen (24× M270 MLRS)
    - 32^{e} Régiment d'Artillerie (32^{e} RA), Oberhoffen (6× Pluton launchers)
    - 43^{e} Régiment d'Artillerie de Marine (43^{e} RAMa) (Réserve), Valbonne (24× M50)
    - 74^{e} Régiment d'Artillerie (74^{e} RA), Belfort (6× Pluton launchers)
    - 75^{e} Régiment d'Artillerie (75^{e} RA) (Réserve), Varces (24× towed M101)
    - 51^{e} Régiment d'Artillerie (51^{e} RA), Wittlich (24× Roland missile systems mounted on AMX-30)
    - 53^{e} Régiment d'Artillerie (53^{e} RA), Breisach (24× Roland missile systems mounted on AMX-30)
    - 602^{e} Régiment NBC (Réserve) Oberhoffen
    - 64^{e} Batterie de Corps d'Armée (64^{e} BACA), Offenburg
  - Brigade Logistique du 2^{e} Corps
    - 135^{e} Régiment du Train (135^{e} RT), Karlsruhe
    - 521^{e} Régiment du Train (521^{e} RT), Karlsruhe
    - 2^{e} Régiment du Matériel (2^{e} RMAT), Freiburg
    - 6^{e} Régiment du Matériel (6^{e} RMAT), Rastatt
    - 7^{e} Régiment du Matériel (7^{e} RMAT), Trier
    - 22^{e} Bataillon du Matériel (22^{e} BMAT), Oberhoffen
    - 702^{e} Compagnie mixte des Essences (702^{e} CME), Renchen (Fuel Supply Company)
    - 777^{e} Compagnie mixte des Essences (Réserve) (777^{e} CME), Renchen
    - 21^{e} Compagnie Médicale, Neustadt
    - 610^{e} Compagnie de Ravitaillement (Réserve), Bühl (Medical Supply Company)
    - 611^{e} Compagnie de Ravitaillement (Réserve), Bühl

===== 3^{e} Division Blindée =====
- 3^{e} Division Blindée, (3^{e} DB), Freiburg, FRG
  - 3^{e} Régiment de Commandement et de Soutien (3^{e} RCS), Freiburg
  - 3^{e} Régiment de Dragons (3^{e} RD), Stetten (70× AMX-30B2, 11× AMX-10P)
  - 12^{e} Régiment de Cuirassiers (12^{e} RC), Müllheim (70× AMX-30B2, 11× AMX-10P)
  - 19^{e} Groupe de Chasseurs (19^{er} GC), Villingen (17× AMX-30B2, 39× AMX-10P)
  - 42^{e} Régiment d'Infanterie (42^{e} RI), Offenburg (17× AMX-30B2, 39× AMX-10P)
  - 110^{e} Régiment d'Infanterie (110^{e} RI), Donaueschingen (70× VAB)
  - 11^{e} Régiment d'Artillerie (11^{er} RA), Offenburg (24× AMX-30 AuF1)
  - 34^{e} Régiment d'Artillerie (34^{e} RA), Müllheim (24× AMX-30 AuF1)
  - 9^{e} Régiment du Génie (9^{e} RG), Neuf-Brisach
  - 3^{e} Escadron d'Éclairage Divisionnaire (3^{e} EED), Stetten
  - 3^{e} Compagnie Antichar (3^{e} CAC), Donaueschingen (12× VAB/HOT)

===== 5^{e} Division Blindée =====
- 5^{e} Division Blindée, (5^{e} DB), Landau
  - 5^{e} Régiment de Commandement et de Soutien (5^{e} RCS), Landau
  - 2^{e} Régiment de Cuirassiers (2^{e} RC), Reutlingen (53× AMX-30B2, 11× AMX-10P)
  - 4^{e} Régiment de Cuirassiers (4^{e} RC), Bitche (53× AMX-30B2, 11× AMX-10P)
  - 5^{e} Régiment de Cuirassiers (5^{e} RC), Kaiserslautern (53× AMX-30B2, 11× AMX-10P)
  - 2^{e} Groupe de Chasseurs (2^{e} GC), Neustadt (17× AMX-30B2, 39× AMX-10P)
  - 24^{e} Groupe de Chasseurs (24^{e} GC), Tübingen (17× AMX-30B2, 39× AMX-10P)
  - 152^{e} Régiment d'Infanterie (152^{e} RI), Colmar (70× VAB)
  - 2^{e} Régiment d'Artillerie (2^{e} RA), Landau (24× AMX-30 AuF1 155mm)
  - 24^{e} Régiment d'Artillerie (24^{e} RA), Reutlingen (24× AMX-30 AuF1 155mm)
  - 32^{e} Régiment du Génie (32^{e} RG), Kehl
  - 5^{e} Escadron d'Éclairage Divisionnaire (5^{e} EED), Landau
  - 5^{e} Compagnie Antichar (5^{e} CAC), Colmar (12× VAB/HOT)

===== 15^{e} Division d'Infanterie =====
- 15^{e} Division d'Infanterie, (15^{e} DI), Limoges, France
  - 15^{e} Régiment de Commande-ment et de Soutien (15^{e} RCS), Limoges
  - 5^{e} Régiment de Chasseurs (5^{e} RCh), Périgueux (36× AMX-10RC, 12× VAB/HOT)
  - 92^{e} Régiment d'Infanterie (92^{e} RI), Clermont-Ferrand (70× VAB)
  - 99^{e} Régiment d'Infanterie (99^{e} RI), Lyon (70× VAB)
  - 126^{e} Régiment d'Infanterie (126^{e} RI), Brive-la-Gaillarde (70× VAB)
  - 20^{e} Régiment d'Artillerie (20^{e} RA), Poitiers (24× M50)
  - 33^{e} Régiment du Génie (Réserve) (33^{e} RG), Castelsarrasin

==== III French Corps ====
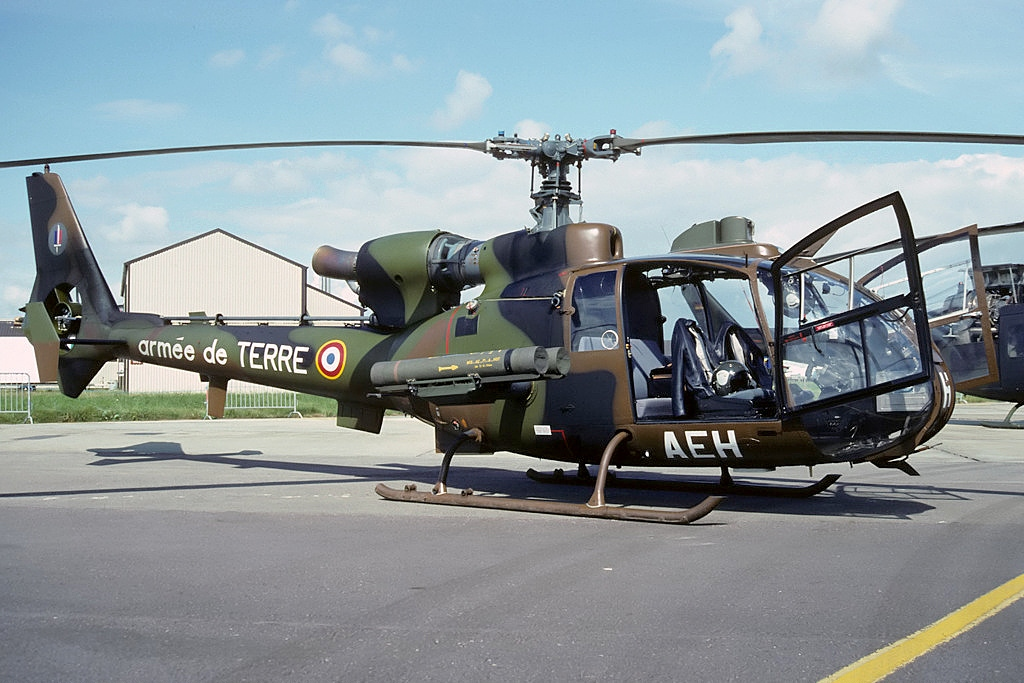
One Gazelle/HOT SA-342M of 6^{e} RHC, 1992.

- III French Corps, 3^{e} Corps d'armée (3^{e} CA), Lille, France
  - 2^{e} Régiment de Hussards (2^{e} RH), Sourdun (36× AMX-10RC, 12× VAB/HOT)
  - 6^{e} Régiment du Génie (6^{e} RG), Angers
  - 71^{e} Régiment du Génie (71^{e} RG), Oissel
  - 6^{e} Régiment d'Helicoptères de Combat (6^{e} RHC), Margny-lès-Compiègne (16× Gazelle/HOT, 10× Gazelle/20mm, 8× Puma)
  - 51^{e} Régiment de Transmission (51^{e} RT), Compiègne
  - 58^{e} Régiment de Transmission (58^{e} RT), Laon
  - 604^{e} Régiment de Circulation Routière (Réserve), (604^{e} RCR), Tours
  - 625^{e} Régiment de Circulation Routière, (625^{e} RCR), Arras
  - 13^{e} Groupe d’Hélicoptères Légers (Réserve), (13^{e} GHL), Lesquin
  - 43^{e} Régiment d'Infanterie et de Commandement de Corps d'armée, (43^{e} RICCA), Lille
  - Commandement de l'Artillerie du 3^{e} Corps
    - 4^{e} Régiment d'Artillerie (4^{e} RA), Couvron (6× Pluton launchers)
    - 2^{e} Régiment d'Artillerie de Marine (2^{e} RAMa) (Reserve), Montlhéry (24× M50)
    - 19^{e} Régiment d'Artillerie (19^{e} RA) (Training), Draguignan (6× Pluton launchers)
    - 22^{e} Régiment d'Artillerie de Marine (22^{e} RAMa) (Réserve), Folembray (24× M50)
    - 54^{e} Régiment d'Artillerie (54^{e} RA), Hyères (24× Roland missile systems mounted on AMX-30)
    - 58^{e} Régiment d'Artillerie (58^{e} RA), Douai (32× Roland missile systems mounted on AMX-30)
    - 603^{e} Régiment NBC, (603^{e} RNBC) (Training), Bretteville-sur-Odon
    - Batterie d'artillerie du 3^{e} Corps d'Armée (BACA 3), Lille
  - Brigade Logistique du 3^{e} Corps
    - 517^{e} Régiment du Train, (517^{e} RT), Vernon
    - 522^{e} Régiment du Train (Réserve), (522^{e} RT), Auneau
    - 3^{e} Régiment du Matériel, (3^{e} RMAT), Beauvais
    - 4^{e} Régiment du Matériel, (4^{e} RMAT), Fontainebleau
    - 705^{e} Compagnie mixte des Essences, (705^{e} CME), Évreux (Fuel Supply Company)
    - 707^{e} Compagnie mixte des Essences (Réserve), (707^{e} CME), Évreux
    - 31^{e} Compagnie Médicale, Sedan
    - 614^{e} Compagnie de Ravitaillement (Réserve), Chartres (Medical Supply Company)
    - 615^{e} Compagnie de Ravitaillement (Réserve), Chartres

===== 2^{e} Division Blindée =====
- 2^{e} Division Blindée, (2^{e} DB), Versailles, France
  - 2^{e} Régiment de Commandement et de Soutien (2^{e} RCS), Satory
  - 2^{e} Régiment de Dragons (2^{e} RD), Laon-Couvron Air Base (53× AMX-30B2)
  - 6^{e} Régiment de Cuirassiers (6^{e} RC), Olivet (53× AMX-30B2,)
  - 501^{e} Régiment Chars de Combat (501^{e} RCC), Rambouillet (53× AMX-30B2)
  - Régiment de Marché de Tchad (RMT), Montlhéry (16× AMX-30B2, 51× AMX-10P)
  - 5^{e} Régiment d'Infanterie (5^{e} RI), Beynes (16× AMX-30B2, 51× AMX-10P)
  - 39^{e} Régiment d'Infanterie (39^{e} RI), Rouen (63× VAB)
  - 1^{er} Régiment d'Artillerie de Marine (1^{er} RAMa), Montlhéry (20× AMX-30 AuF1)
  - 40^{e} Régiment d'Artillerie (40^{e} RA), Suippes (20× AMX-30 AuF1)
  - 34^{e} Régiment du Génie (34^{e} RG), Épernay
  - 2^{e} Escadron d'Éclairage Divisionnaire (2^{e} EED), Saint-Germain-en-Laye
  - 2^{e} Compagnie Antichar (10^{e} CAC), Rouen (12× VAB/HOT)

===== 8^{e} Division d'Infanterie =====
- 8^{e} Division d'Infanterie, (8^{e} DI), Amiens, France
  - 8^{e} Régiment de Commande-ment et de Soutien (8^{e} RCS), Amiens
  - 7^{e} Régiment de Chasseurs (7^{e} RCh), Arras (36× AMX-10RC, 24× [Milan (missile)])
  - 8^{e} Régiment d'Infanterie (8^{e} RI), Noyon (84× VAB)
  - 67^{e} Régiment d'Infanterie (67^{e} RI), Soissons (84× VAB)
  - 94^{e} Régiment d'Infanterie (94^{e} RI), Sissonne (84× VAB)
  - 41^{e} Régiment d'Artillerie de Marine (41^{e} RAMa), La Fère (24× M50)
  - 23^{e} Régiment du Génie (Réserve) (23^{e} RG), Oissel

===== 10^{e} Division Blindée =====
- 10^{e} Division Blindée, (10^{e} DB), Châlons-sur-Marne, France
  - 10^{e} Régiment de Commandement et de Soutien (10^{e} RCS), Châlons-sur-Marne
  - 2^{e} Régiment de Chasseurs (2^{e} RCh), Thierville-sur-Meuse (53× AMX-30B2, 11× AMX-10P)
  - 4^{e} Régiment de Dragons (4^{e} RD), Mourmelon (53× AMX-30B2, 11× AMX-10P)
  - 503^{e} Régiment Chars de Combat (503^{e} RCC), Mourmelon (53× AMX-30B2, 11× AMX-10P)
  - 1^{er} Groupe de Chasseurs (1^{er} GC), Reims (17× AMX-30B2, 39× AMX-10P)
  - 150^{e} Régiment d'Infanterie (150^{e} RI), Verdun (17× AMX-30B2, 39× AMX-10P)
  - 151^{e} Régiment d'Infanterie (151^{e} RI), Metz (70× VAB)
  - 3^{e} Régiment d'Artillerie de Marine (3^{e} RAMa), Verdun (24× AMX-30 AuF1)
  - 8^{e} Régiment d'Artillerie (8^{e} RA), Commercy (24× AMX-30 AuF1)
  - 3^{e} Régiment du Génie (3^{e} RG), Charleville-Mézières
  - 10^{e} Escadron d'Éclairage Divisionnaire (10^{e} EED), Mourmelon
  - 10^{e} Compagnie Antichar (10^{e} CAC), Metz (12× VAB/HOT)

=== Rapid Action Force ===
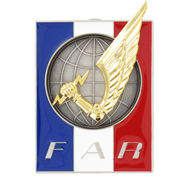

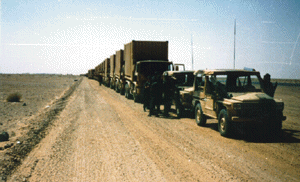
Logistics Convoy of the 511^{e} Régiment du Train of Operation Daguet.

- Headquarters Rapid Action Force, Saint-Germain-en-Laye
  - 17e Régiment de Commandement et de Soutien (17^{e} RCS), Maisons-Laffitte
  - 28e Régiiment de Transmission, (28^{e} RT), Orléans
  - 511e Régiment du Train, (511^{e} RT), Vernon
  - 615e Régiment de Circulation Routière, (615^{e} RCR), Pannes
  - 622e Régiment de Circulation Routière (Réserve), (622^{e} RCR), Dôle
  - 703e Compagnie mixte des Essences, (703^{e} CME), Chalon-sur-Saône
  - 708e Compagnie mixte des Essences (Réserve), (708^{e} CME), Chalon-sur-Saône

==== 4th Airmobile Division ====
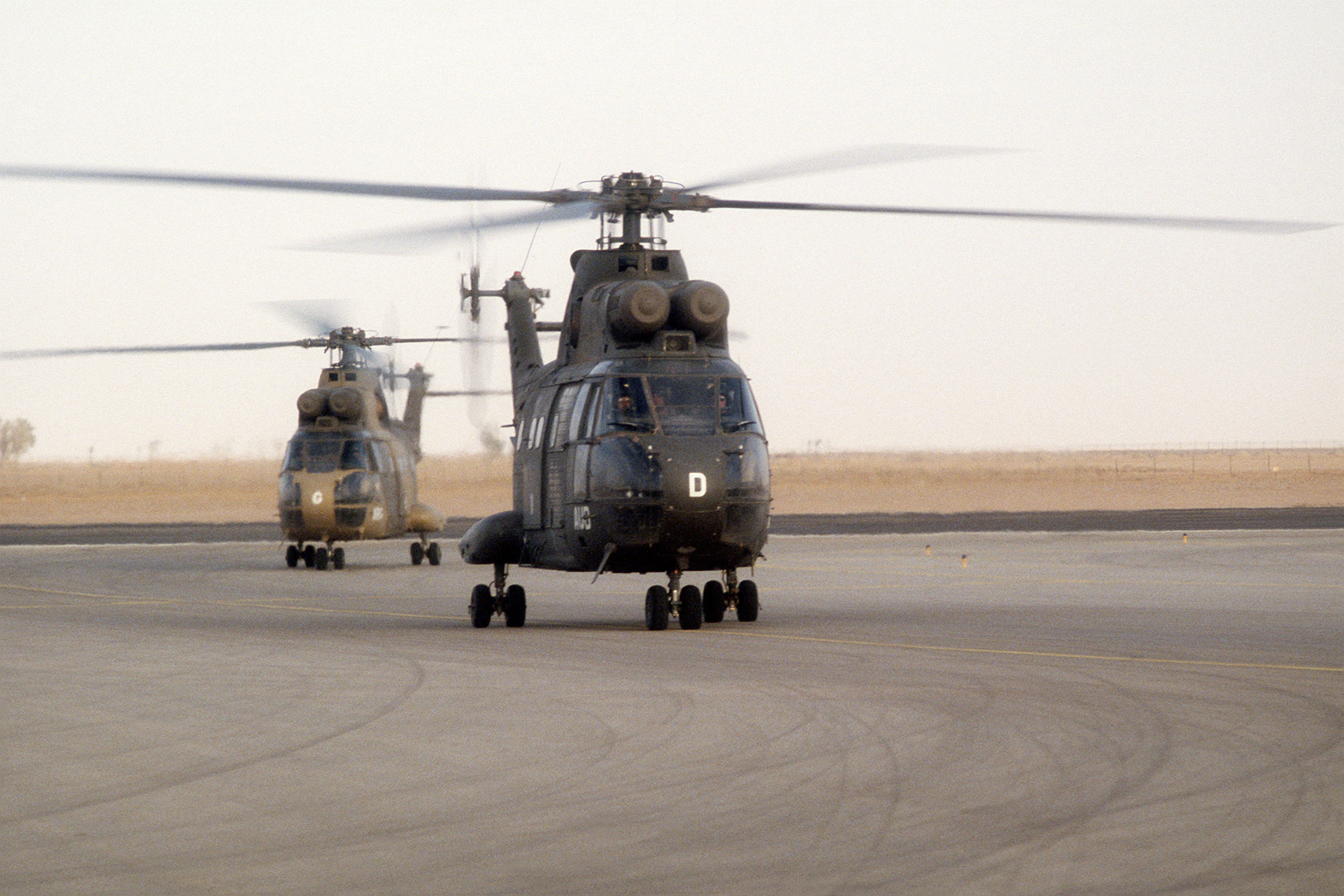
SA 330 Puma helicopters during Operation Desert Shield.

- 4^{e} Division Aéromobile, Nancy, France
  - 4^{e} Régiment d'Hélicoptères de Commandement et de Manœuvre (4^{e} RHCM), Nancy (10× Gazelle 341F, 30× Puma)
  - 1^{er} Régiment d'Infanterie (1^{er} RI), Sarrebourg
  - 1^{er} Régiment d'Helicopteres de Combat (1^{e} RHC), Phalsbourg (10× Sa-341, 30× Gazelle/HOT, 10× Gazelle/20mm, 10× Puma)
  - 3^{e} Régiment d'Helicopteres de Combat (3^{e} RHC), Étain (10× Sa-341, 30× Gazelle/HOT, 10× Gazelle/20mm, 10× Puma)
  - 5^{e} Régiment d'Helicopteres de Combat (5^{e} RHC), Pau (10× Sa-341, 30× Gazelle/HOT, 10× Gazelle/20mm, 10× Puma)
  - 9^{e} Régiment de Soutien Aéromobile (9^{e} RSAM), Phalsbourg:

Wartime: The 4th RHCM consists of a squadron commander and liaison with ten light helicopters type SA341F Gazelle, and five utility helicopters squadrons each with ten type SA330Ba Puma transport helicopters. The 1st, 3rd and 5th RHC are composed of a squadron of light reconnaissance helicopter with nine light helicopters type SA341F Gazelle. These devices called "smooth" knowing that they do not carry on-board armament, used for reconnaissance or command support, a support helicopter squadron protection with ten light helicopters type SA341F2 Gazelle. These aircraft, each provided with a 20 mm gun used in support of ground troops and protection of other aircraft, anti-tank squadrons of three helicopters, each with ten light helicopters type SA342M Gazelle. These aircraft have four HOT antitank missiles for destroying armored vehicles of all kinds and a helicopter squadron maneuver with ten type SA330Ba Puma transport helicopters. None of these units possess Alouette III that is found only in peacetime in the 6th and 7th RHC each with ten machines.

==== 6^{e} Division Légère Blindée ====
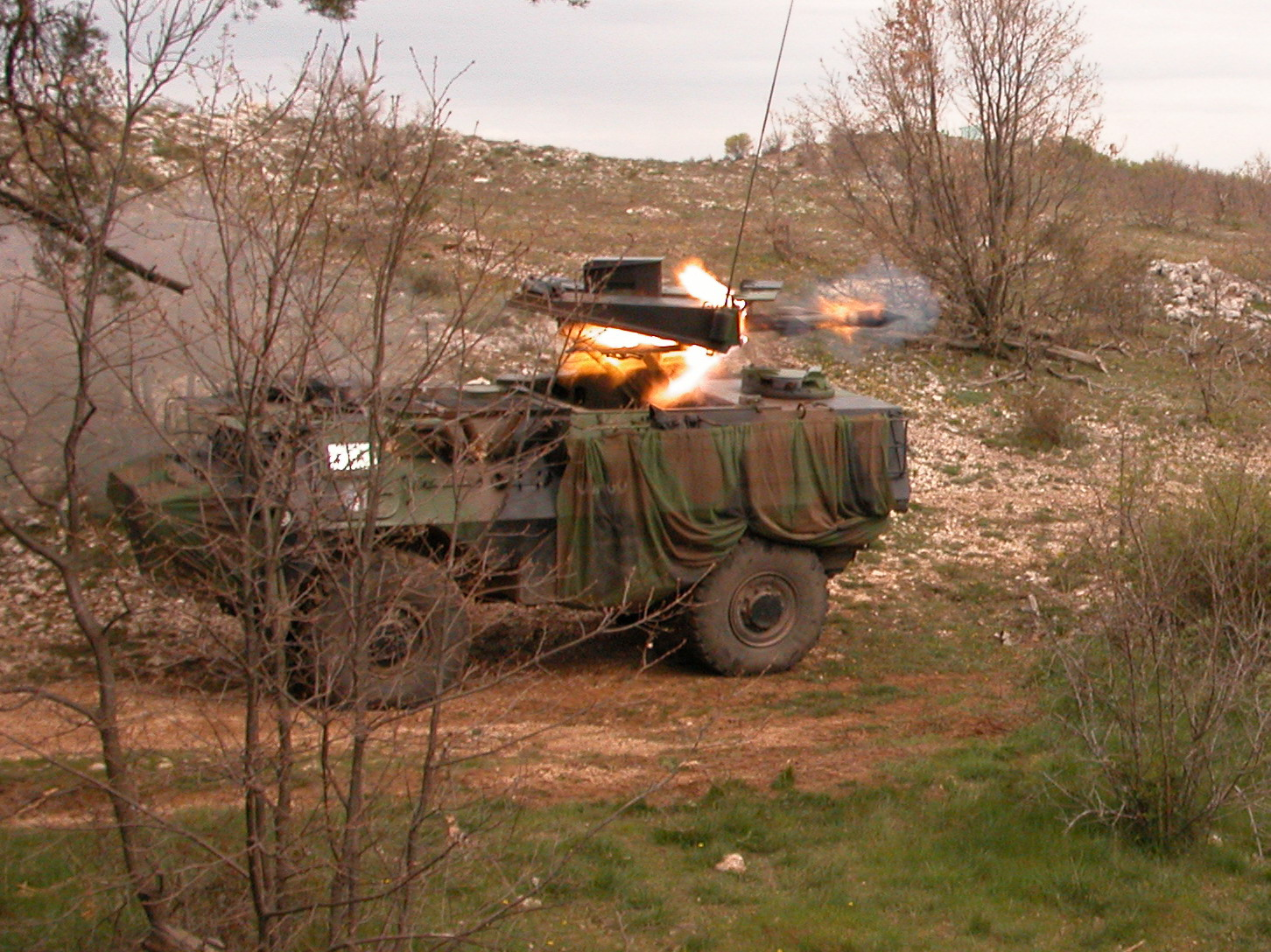
VAB-HOT (Mephisto) of 2^{e} REI.

- 6^{e} Division Légère Blindée, (6^{e} DLB), Nîmes
  - 6^{e} Régiment de Commandement et de Soutien (6^{e} RCS), Nîmes
  - 1^{er} Régiment de Spahis (1^{er} RS), Valence (36× AMX-10RC, 12× VAB/HOT)
  - 1^{er} Régiment Étranger de Cavalerie (1^{er} REC), Orange (36× AMX-10RC, 12× VAB/HOT)
  - 2^{e} Régiment Étranger d'Infanterie (2^{e} REI), Nîmes (70× VAB)
  - 21^{e} Régiment d'Infanterie de Marine (21^{e} RIMa), Fréjus (70× VAB)
  - 68^{e} Régiment d'Artillerie (68^{e} RA), Valbonne (24× M50)
  - 6^{e} Régiment Étranger de Génie (6^{e} REG), L’Ardoise

==== 9^{e} Division d'Infanterie de Marine ====
- 9^{e} Division d'Infanterie de Marine, (9^{e} DIMa), Nantes, trained for amphibious operations
  - 9^{e} Régiment de Commandement et de Soutien (9^{e} RCS), Nantes
  - Régiment d'Infanterie-Chars de Marine (RICM), Vannes (36× ERC-90, 12× VAB/HOT)
  - 1^{er} Régiment d'Infanterie de Marine (1^{er} RIMa), Angoulême (36× ERC 90, 12× VAB/HOT)
  - 2^{e} Régiment d'Infanterie de Marine (2^{e} RIMa), Champagné (70× VAB)
  - 3^{e} Régiment d'Infanterie de Marine (3^{e} RIMa), Vannes (70× VAB)
  - 11^{e} Régiment d'Artillerie de Marine (11^{e} RAMa), Saint-Aubin-du-Cormier (24× towed M101)
  - 14^{e} Regiment du Génie (Reserve) (14^{e} RG), Angers

==== 11^{e} Division Parachutiste ====
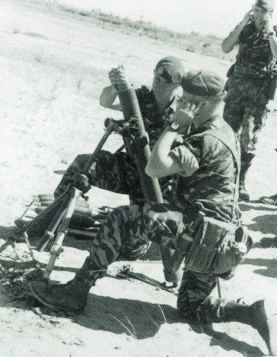
81mm mortar from the 2nd Foreign Parachute Regiment during the Battle of Kolwezi.

- 11^{e} Division Parachutiste, (11^{e} DP), Toulouse
  - 7^{e} Régiment de Commandement et de Soutien (7^{e} RPCS), Albi
  - 14^{e} Régiment de Commandement et de Soutien (14^{e} RPCS), Toulouse
  - 1^{er} Régiment de Hussards Parachutistes (1^{er} RHP), Tarbes (36× AML 90)
  - 1^{er} Régiment de Chasseurs Parachutistes (1^{er} RCP), Saint-Médard-en-Jalles
  - 1^{er} Régiment de Parachutistes d'Infanterie de Marine (1^{er} RPIMa), Bayonne
  - 2^{e} Régiment Étranger de Parachutistes (2^{e} REP), Calvi
  - 3^{e} Régiment Parachutiste d'Infanterie de Marine (3^{e} RPIMa), Carcassonne
  - 6^{e} Régiment Parachutiste d'Infanterie de Marine (6^{e} RPIMa), Mont-de-Marsan
  - 8^{e} Régiment Parachutiste d'Infanterie de Marine (8^{e} RPIMa), Castres
  - 9^{e} Régiment de Chasseurs Parachutistes (9^{e} RCP), Pamiers
  - 35^{e} Régiment d'Artillerie Parachutiste (35^{e} RAP), Tarbes (24× towed M101)
  - 17^{e} Régiment du Génie Parachutiste (6^{e} RGP), Montauban

==== 27^{e} Division Alpine ====
- 27^{e} Division Alpine, (27^{e} DA), Grenoble
  - 27^{e} Régiment de Commandement et de Soutien (27^{e} RCS), Grenoble
  - fr:4e régiment de chasseurs (4^{e} RCh), Gap (36× Panhard ERC-90)
  - 6^{e} Bataillon de Chasseurs Alpins (6^{e} BCA), Varces-Allières-et-Risset
  - 7^{e} Bataillon de Chasseurs Alpins (7^{e} BCA), Bourg-Saint-Maurice
  - 11^{e} Bataillon de Chasseurs Alpins (11^{e} BCA), Barcelonnette
  - 13^{e} Bataillon de Chasseurs Alpins (13^{e} BCA), Chambéry
  - 27^{e} Bataillon de Chasseurs Alpins (27^{e} BCA), Annecy
  - 159^{e} Régiment d'Infanterie Alpine (159^{e} RIA), Briançon
  - 93^{e} Régiment d'Artillerie de Montagne (93^{e} RAM), Varces (24× towed M101)
  - 7^{e} Bataillon du Génie de division Alpine (7^{e} BGDA), Avignon puis 7^{e} Régiment du Génie

=== 1st Logistic Command ===
The 1st Logistic Command provided overseas logistic capabilities.

- 1st Logistic Command, Montigny-lès-Metz
  - 1^{er} Régiment de Livraison par Air (1^{er} RLA), Montigny-les-Metz
  - 121^{e} Régiment du Train, (121^{e} RT), Linas
  - 503^{e} Régiment du Train, (503^{e} RT), La Rochelle
  - 505^{e} Régiment du Train, (505^{e} RT), Vienne
  - 515^{e} Régiment du Train (515^{e} RT), Brie
  - 519^{e} Régiment du Train (519^{e} RT), La Rochelle
  - 525^{e} Régiment du Train (525^{e} RT), Arras
  - 585^{e} Régiment du Train (Réserve) (585^{e} RT), Moulins
  - 500^{e} Groupe de Transbordement Portuaire (Réserve), La Rochelle
  - 504^{e} Groupe de Transbordement Portuaire (Réserve), La Rochelle
  - 506^{e} Groupe de Transbordement Portuaire (Réserve), La Rochelle
  - 509^{e} Groupe de Transbordement Portuaire (Réserve), La Rochelle
  - 514^{e} Groupe de Transbordement Portuaire (Réserve), La Rochelle

== Graphic of the French Army in Europe ==
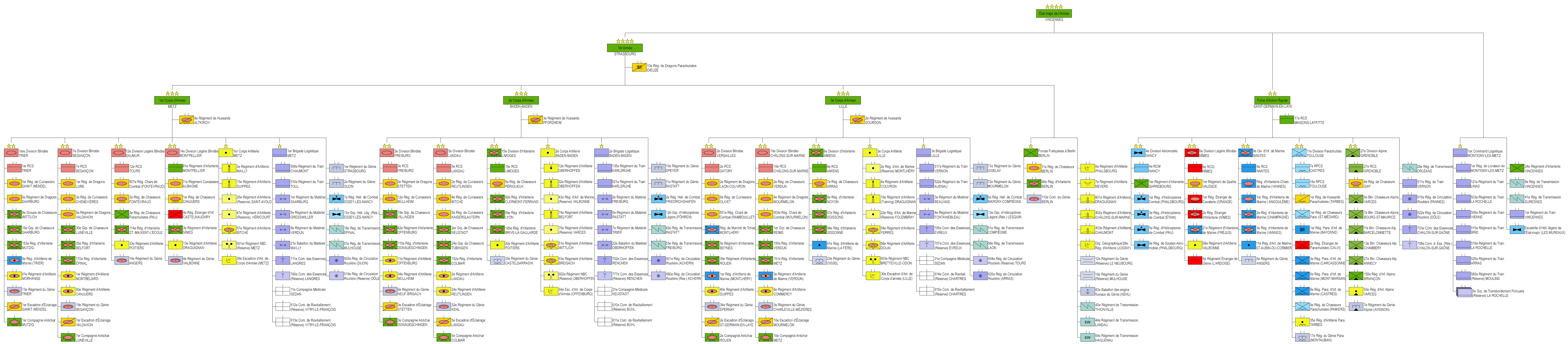
Structure of the active units of the French Army in Europe in 1989 (click to enlarge)

== Overseas Units ==
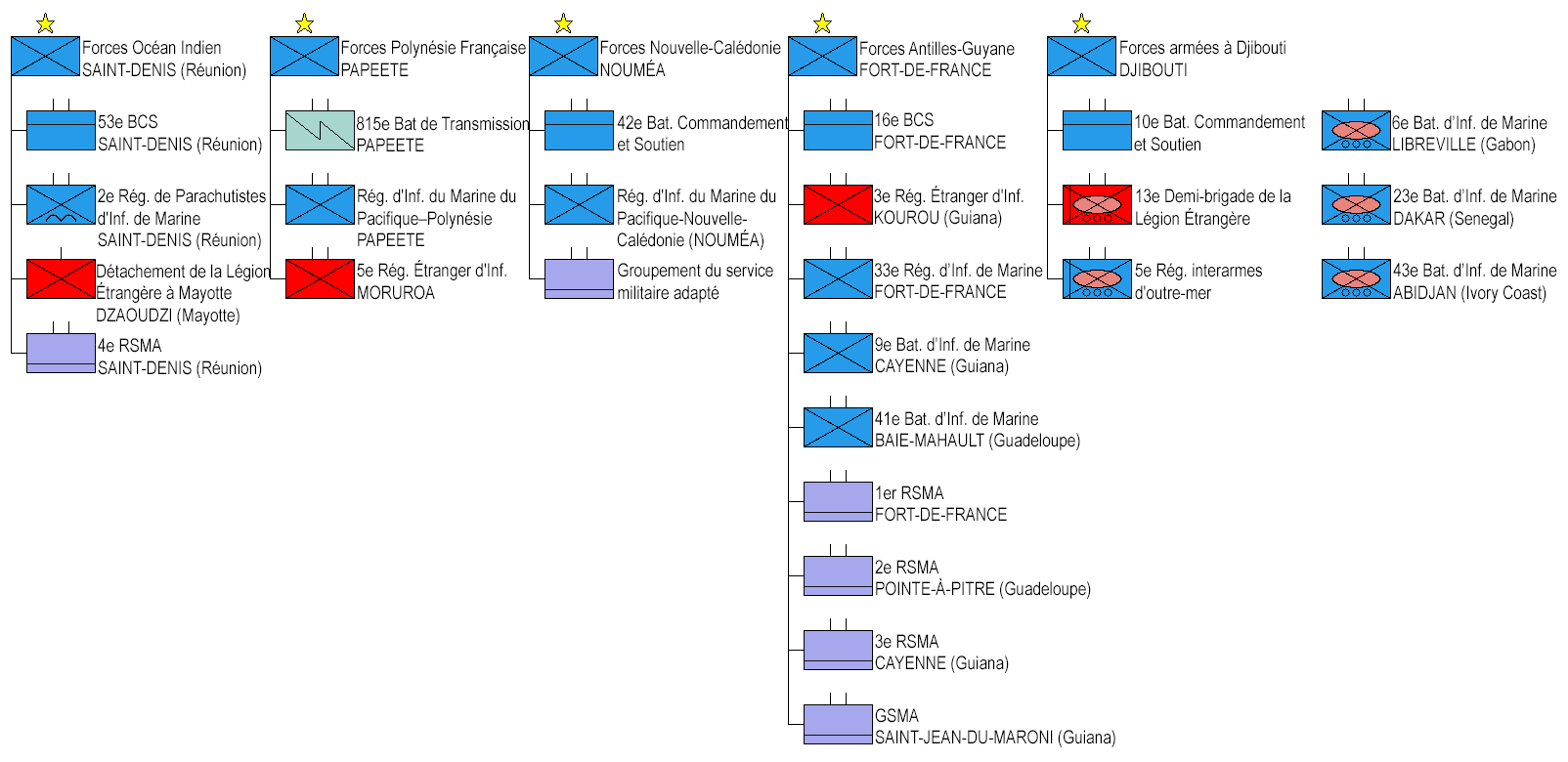
French Overseas Units in 1989 (click to enlarge)

=== Africa ===
Army forces in West Africa:

- Forces armées prépositionnées en Afrique
  - 6the Marine Infantry Battalion (6e BIMa), Libreville (Gabon)
  - 23^{e} Bataillon d’Infanterie de Marine (23^{e} BIMA), Dakar (Senegal)
  - 43^{e} Bataillon d’Infanterie de Marine (43^{e} BIMA), Abidjan (Ivory Coast)

=== Djibouti ===
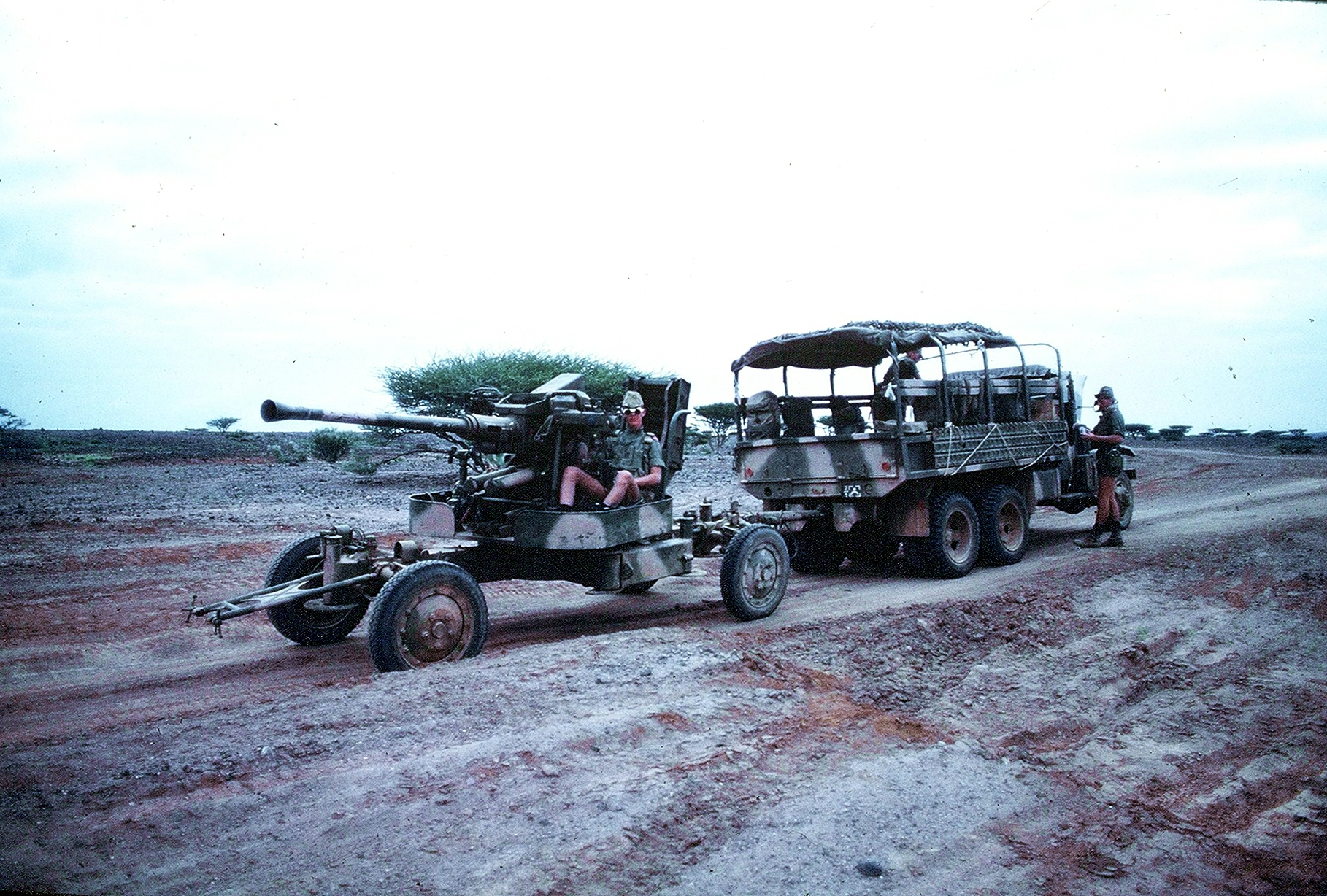
A Bofors 40 mm anti-aircraft gun of the 5th RIAM of Djibouti towed by a GMC CCKW in 1984.

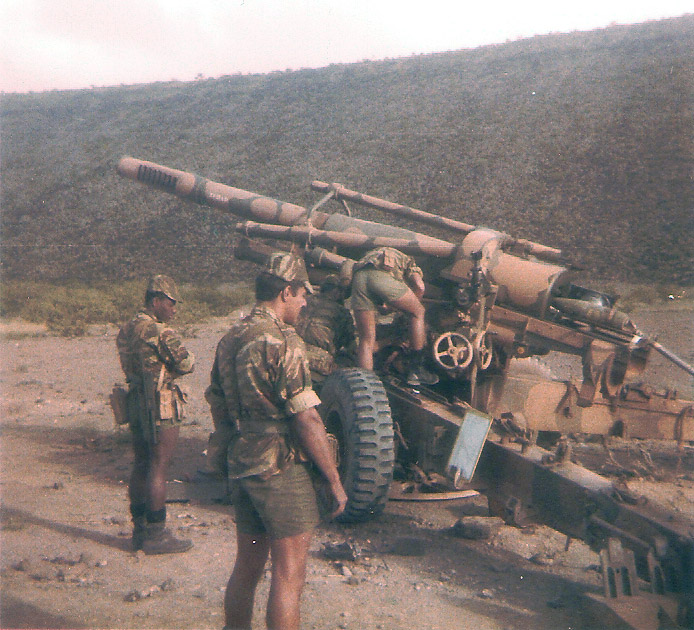
Obusier de 155 mm Modèle 50 in Djibouti in 1979.

Army forces in Djibouti:

- Forces armées stationnées à Djibouti, Djibouti
  - 10^{e} Bataillon de Commandement et de Soutien (10^{e} BCS), Djibouti
  - 5^{e} Régiment interarmes d'outre-mer, Djibouti
  - 13^{e} Demi-brigade de la Légion Étrangère, Djibouti

=== Antilles & Guiana ===
Army forces in the Lesser Antilles and French Guiana:

- Forces armées du groupe Antilles-Guyane, Fort-de-France (Martinique)
  - 16^{e} Bataillon de Commandement et de Soutien (16^{e} BCS), Fort-de-France (Martinique)
  - 3^{e} Régiment Étranger d'Infanterie (3e REI), Kourou (Guiana)
  - 33^{e} Régiment d’Infanterie de Marine (33^{e} RIMA), Fort-de-France (Martinique)
  - 9^{e} Bataillon d’Infanterie de Marine (9^{e} BIMA), Cayenne (Guiana)
  - 41^{e} Bataillon d’Infanterie de Marine (41^{e} BIMA), Baie-Mahault (Guadeloupe)
  - 1^{er} Régiment du service militaire adapté, Fort-de-France (Martinique)
  - 2^{e} Régiment du service militaire adapté, Pointe-à-Pitre (Guadeloupe)
  - 3^{e} Régiment du service militaire adapté, Cayenne (Guiana)
  - Groupement du service militaire adapté Saint-Jean-du-Maroni (Guiana)

=== Indian Ocean ===
Army forces in the Southern Indian Ocean:

- Forces armées de la zone sud de l'Océan Indien, Saint-Denis (Réunion)
  - 53^{e} Bataillon de Commandement et de Soutien (53^{e} BCS), Saint-Denis (Réunion)
  - 2^{e} Régiment Parachutiste d'Infanterie de Marine (2^{e} RPIMa), Saint-Denis (Réunion)
  - Détachement de la Légion Étrangère à Mayotte, Dzaoudzi (Mayotte)
  - 4^{e} Régiment du service militaire adapté, Saint-Denis (Réunion)

=== French Polynesia ===
Army forces in French Polynesia:

- Forces armées en Polynésie Française, Papeete (Tahiti)
  - 5e Régiment Étranger d'Infanterie (5^{e} RE), Moruroa
  - Régiment d'infanterie du Marine du Pacifique–Polynésie, Papeete
  - 815^{e} Bataillon de Transmission (815^{e} BT), Papeete

=== New Caledonia ===
Army forces in New Caledonia:

- Forces armées de la Nouvelle-Calédonie, Nouméa
  - 42^{e} Bataillon de Commandement et de Soutien (42^{e} BCS), Nouméa
  - Régiment d'Infanterie du Marine du Pacifique-Nouvelle-Calédonie, Nouméa
  - Groupement du service militaire adapté, Nouméa

== Military regions and reserve forces ==
In 1984, Isby and Kamps wrote that the Défense opérationnelle du territoire term remained in use despite the command having been disbanded in the 1970s.

=== 1st Military Region ===
- 1^{ère} Région militaire (1^{ère} RM), Paris
  - 6^{e} Régiment de Chasseurs (Réserve) (6^{e} RCh), Rambouillet, (with AML-60 and AML-90)
  - 12^{e} Régiment de Dragons (Réserve) (12^{e} RD), Orléans, (with AML-60 and AML-90)
  - 54^{e} Régiment d'Infanterie de Marine (Réserve) (54^{e} RIMa), Pontoise
  - 95^{e} Régiment d’Infanterie (Réserve) (95^{e} RI), Bourges
  - 5^{e} Régiment du Génie (Réserve) (5^{e} RG), Versailles
  - 1^{er} Régiment de Transmission de Zone de Défense (Réserve), (1^{er} RTZD), Pontoise
  - 49^{e} Régiment de Transmission, (49^{e} RT), Pontoise
  - 101^{e} Régiment du Train de Zone (Réserve) (101^{e} RTZ), Linas
  - 505^{e} Groupe Antiaérien Léger (Réserve) (505^{e} GAL), Provins, (Bofors 40 mm gun)
  - 1^{er} Groupe d’Hélicoptères Légers, Les Mureaux
  - 102^{e} Brigade de Zone (Réserve) (102^{e} BZ), Saint-Germain-en-Laye
    - 102^{e} Régiment de Commandement et de Soutien (102^{e} RCS), Versailles
    - 8^{e} Régiment de Chasseurs (8^{e} RCh), Olivet, (with AML-60 and AML-90)
    - 70^{e} Régiment d'Infanterie de Marine (70^{e} RIMa), Montlhéry
    - 91^{e} Régiment d'Infanterie (91^{e} RI), Beynes
    - 152^{e} Compagnie du Génie (152e CG), Versailles
    - 162^{e} Compagnie du Génie (162e CG), Versailles
  - 12^{e} Circonscription Militaire de Défense
    - 76^{e} Régiment d'Infanterie (Réserve) (76^{e} RI), Vincennes
  - 13^{e} Circonscription Militaire de Défense
    - 90^{e} Régiment d'Infanterie (Réserve) (90^{e} RI), Châteauroux

=== 2nd Military Region ===
- 2^{e} Région militaire (2^{e} RM), Lille
  - 5^{e} Régiment de Hussards (Réserve) (5^{e} RH), Laon, (with AML-60 and AML-90)
  - 28^{e} Régiment d’Infanterie (Réserve) (28^{e} RI), Évreux
  - 33^{e} Régiment d’Infanterie (Réserve) (33^{e} RI), Saint-Omer
  - 73^{e} Régiment d’Infanterie (Réserve) (73^{e} RI), Aire-sur-la-Lys
  - 84^{e} Régiment d’Infanterie (Réserve) (84^{e} RI), Cambrai
  - 127^{e} Régiment d’Infanterie (Réserve) (127^{e} RI), Laon
  - 2^{e} Régiment de Transmission de Zone de Défense (Réserve), (2^{e} RTZD), Lille
  - 52^{e} Régiment de Transmission, (52^{e} RT), Lille
  - 102^{e} Régiment du Train de Zone (Réserve)(102^{e} RTZ), Arras
  - Bataillon des canonniers sédentaires (Réserve) Lille, (Bofors 40 mm gun)
  - 2^{e} Groupe d’Hélicoptères Légers, Dax
  - 108^{e} Brigade de Zone (108^{e} BZ), Amiens
    - 108^{e} Régiment de Commandement et de Soutien (108^{e} RCS), Amiens
    - 18^{e} Régiment de Chasseurs (18^{e} RCh), Arras, (with AML-60 and AML-90)
    - 45^{e} Régiment d'Infanterie (45^{e} RI), Soissons
    - 87^{e} Régiment d'Infanterie (87^{e} RI), Sissonne
    - 158^{e} Compagnie du Génie (158e CG), Oissel
    - 168^{e} Compagnie du Génie (168e CG), Oissel
  - 21^{e} Circonscription Militaire de Défense
    - 243^{e} Régiment d'Infanterie (Réserve) (243^{e} RI), Lille
  - 22^{e} Circonscription Militaire de Défense
    - 54^{e} Régiment d'Infanterie (Réserve) (54^{e} RI), Noyon
  - 23^{e} Circonscription Militaire de Défense
    - 239^{e} Régiment d'Infanterie (Réserve) (239^{e} RI), Rouen

=== 3rd Military Region ===
- 3^{e} Région militaire (3^{e} RM), Rennes
  - 41^{e} Régiment d'Infanterie (41^{e} RI), Châteaulin (70× VAB)
  - 19^{e} Régiment d’Infanterie (Réserve) (19^{e} RI), Brest
  - 77^{e} Régiment d’Infanterie (Réserve) (77^{e} RI), Fontevraud-l'Abbaye
  - 115^{e} Régiment d’Infanterie (Réserve) (115^{e} RI), Thorée-les-Pins
  - 118^{e} Régiment d’Infanterie (Réserve) (118^{e} RI), Châteaulin
  - 125^{e} Régiment d’Infanterie (Réserve) (125^{e} RI), Poitiers
  - 21^{e} Régiment du Génie (Réserve) (21^{e} RG), Angers
  - 3^{e} Régiment de Transmission de Zone de Défense (Réserve), (3^{e} RTZD), Laval
  - 38^{e} Régiment de Transmission, (38^{e} RT), Laval
  - 103^{e} Régiment du Train de Zone (Réserve)(103^{e} RTZ), La Rochelle
  - 504^{e} Groupe Antiaérien Léger (Réserve) (504^{e} GAL), Tourouvre, (Bofors 40 mm gun)
  - 3^{e} Groupe d’Hélicoptères Légers, Saint-Jacques-de-la-Lande
  - 109^{e} Brigade de Zone (Réserve) (109^{e} BZ), Saint-Malo
    - 109^{e} Régiment de Commandement et de Soutien (109^{e} RCS), Dinan
    - 19^{e} Régiment de Dragons (19^{e} RD), Vannes, (with AML-60 and AML-90)
    - 62^{e} Régiment d'Infanterie (62^{e} RI), Vannes
    - 117^{e} Régiment d'Infanterie (117^{e} RI), Le Mans
    - 159^{e} Compagnie du Génie (159e CG), Angers
    - 169^{e} Compagnie du Génie (169e CG), Angers
  - 31^{e} Circonscription Militaire de Défense
    - 48^{e} Régiment d'Infanterie (Réserve) (48^{e} RI), Guingamp
  - 32^{e} Circonscription Militaire de Défense
    - 2^{e} Régiment d'Infanterie (Réserve) (2^{e} RI), Caen
  - 33^{e} Circonscription Militaire de Défense
    - 137^{e} Régiment d'Infanterie (Réserve) (137^{e} RI), Fontenay-le-Comte

=== 4th Military Region ===
- 4^{e} Région militaire (4^{e} RM), Bordeaux
  - 49^{e} Régiment d'Infanterie (Réserve) (49^{e} RI), Bayonne
  - 50^{e} Régiment d’Infanterie (Réserve) (50^{e} RI), Périgueux
  - 63^{e} Régiment d’Infanterie (Réserve) (63^{e} RI), Limoges
  - 83^{e} Régiment d’Infanterie (Réserve) (83^{e} RI), Toulouse
  - 88^{e} Régiment d’Infanterie (Réserve) (88^{e} RI), Auch
  - 17^{e} Régiment d'Artillerie (Training) (17^{e} RA), Biscarrosse, (Bofors 40 mm gun)
  - 31^{e} Régiment du Génie (Réserve) (31^{e} RG), Castelsarrasin
  - 4^{e} Régiment de Transmission de Zone de Défense (Réserve), (4^{e} RTZD), Bordeaux
  - 48^{e} Régiment de Transmission, (48^{e} RT), Bordeaux
  - 104^{e} Régiment du Train de Zone (Réserve)(104^{e} RTZ), Brie
  - 4^{e} Groupe d’Hélicoptères Légers, Martignas-sur-Jalle
  - 115^{e} Brigade de Zone (Réserve) (115^{e} BZ), Limoges
    - 115^{e} Régiment de Commandement et de Soutien (115^{e} RCS), Limoges
    - 9^{e} Régiment de Chasseurs (9^{e} RCh), Périgueux, (with AML-60 and AML-90)
    - 18^{e} Régiment d'Infanterie (18^{e} RI), Pau
    - 34^{e} Régiment d'Infanterie (34^{e} RI), Mont-de-Marsan
    - 165^{e} Compagnie du Génie (165e CG), Castelsarrasin
    - 175^{e} Compagnie du Génie (175e CG), Castelsarrasin
  - 41^{e} Circonscription Militaire de Défense
    - 144^{e} Régiment d'Infanterie (Réserve) (144^{e} RI), Martignas-sur-Jalle
  - 42^{e} Circonscription Militaire de Défense
    - 107^{e} Régiment d'Infanterie (Réserve) (107^{e} RI), Angoulême
  - 43^{e} Circonscription Militaire de Défense
    - 100^{e} Régiment d'Infanterie (Réserve) (100^{e} RI), Brive-la-Gaillarde
  - 44^{e} Circonscription Militaire de Défense
    - 15^{e} Régiment d'Infanterie (Réserve) (15^{e} RI), Castres

=== 5th Military Region ===
- 5^{e} Région militaire (5^{e} RM), Lyon
  - 8^{e} Régiment d'Infanterie de Marine (Réserve) (8^{e} RIMa), Tarascon
  - 16^{e} Régiment d’Infanterie (Réserve) (16^{e} RI), Clermont-Ferrand
  - 38^{e} Régiment d’Infanterie (Réserve) (38^{e} RI), Saint-Étienne
  - 52^{e} Régiment d’Infanterie (Réserve) (52^{e} RI), Sathonay
  - 53^{e} Régiment d’Infanterie (Réserve) (53^{e} RI), Lunel
  - 112^{e} Régiment d’Infanterie (Réserve) (112^{e} RI), La Valette
  - 121^{e} Régiment d’Infanterie (Réserve) (121^{e} RI), Moulins
  - 15^{e} Bataillon de Chasseurs Alpins (Réserve)(15e BCA), Barcelonnette
  - 22^{e} Bataillon de Chasseurs Alpins (Réserve)(22e BCA), Briançon
  - 53^{e} Bataillon de Chasseurs Alpins (Réserve)(53e BCA), Chambéry
  - 5^{e} Régiment de Transmission de Zone de Défense (Réserve), (5^{e} RTZD), Montélimar
  - 45^{e} Régiment de Transmission, (45^{e} RT), Montélimar
  - 105^{e} Régiment du Train de Zone (Réserve)(105^{e} RTZ), Vienne
  - 506^{e} Groupe Antiaérien Léger (Réserve) (506^{e} GAL), Hyères, (Bofors 40 mm gun)
  - 5^{e} Groupe d’Hélicoptères Légers, Lyon
  - 24^{e} Bataillon du Matériel, (24^{e} BMAT), Saint-Priest
  - 127^{e} Brigade de Zone (Réserve) (127^{e} BZ), Grenoble
    - 127^{e} Régiment de Commandement et de Soutien (127^{e} RCS), Grenoble
    - 13^{e} Régiment de Chasseurs (13^{e} RCh), Gap, (with AML-60 and AML-90)
    - 67^{e} Bataillon de Chasseurs Alpins (67e BCA)
    - 140^{e} Régiment d'Infanterie Alpine (140^{e} RIA), Varces
    - 177^{e} Compagnie du Génie (177e CG), Avignon
    - 187^{e} Compagnie du Génie (187e CG), Avignon
  - 51^{e} Circonscription Militaire de Défense
    - 299^{e} Régiment d'Infanterie (Réserve) (299^{e} RI), Sathonay
  - 52^{e} Circonscription Militaire de Défense
    - 292^{e} Régiment d'Infanterie (Réserve) (292^{e} RI), Clermont-Ferrand
  - 53^{e} Circonscription Militaire de Défense
    - 141^{e} Régiment d'Infanterie (Réserve) (141^{e} RI), La Valette
  - 54^{e} Circonscription Militaire de Défense
    - 142^{e} Régiment d'Infanterie (Réserve) (142^{e} RI), Béziers
  - 55^{e} Circonscription Militaire de Défense
    - 173^{e} Régiment d'Infanterie (Réserve) (173^{e} RI), Bastia - disbanded July 2001 and contributed to formation of 6th Company, 2nd Foreign Parachute Regiment.
    - 373^{e} Régiment d'Infanterie (Réserve) (373^{e} RI), Ajaccio

=== 6th Military Region ===
- 6^{e} Région militaire (6^{e} RM), Metz
  - 56^{e} Régiment d’Infanterie (Réserve) (56^{e} RI), Digoin
  - 69^{e} Régiment d’Infanterie (Réserve) (69^{e} RI), Pont-Sainte-Marie
  - 79^{e} Régiment d’Infanterie (Réserve) (79^{e} RI), Saint-Avold
  - 89^{e} Régiment d’Infanterie (Réserve) (89^{e} RI), Sens
  - 133^{e} Régiment d’Infanterie (Réserve) (133^{e} RI), Bourg-en-Bresse
  - 59^{e} Régiment d'Artillerie (Réserve) (59^{e} RA), Colmar, (Bofors 40 mm gun)
  - 6^{e} Régiment de Transmission de Zone de Défense (Réserve), (6^{e} RTZD), Montigny-lès-Metz
  - 43^{e} Régiment de Transmission, (43^{e} RT), Montigny-lès-Metz
  - 106^{e} Régiment du Train de Zone (Réserve)(106^{e} RTZ), Ecrouves
  - 6^{e} Groupe d’Hélicoptères Légers, Dax
  - 107^{e} Brigade de Zone (Réserve) (107^{e} BZ), Besançon
    - 107^{e} Régiment de Commandement et de Soutien (107^{e} RCS), Besançon
    - 10^{e} Régiment de Chasseurs (10^{e} RCh), Lunéville, (with AML-60 and AML-90)
    - 23^{e} Régiment d'Infanterie (23^{e} RI), Les Rousses
    - 149^{e} Régiment d'Infanterie (149^{e} RI), Lunéville
    - 157^{e} Compagnie du Génie (67e CG), Besançon
    - 167^{e} Compagnie du Génie (167e CG), Besançon
  - 110^{e} Brigade de Zone (Réserve) (110^{e} BZ), Châlons-en-Champagne
    - 110^{e} Régiment de Commandement et de Soutien (110^{e} RCS), Chalons sur Marne
    - 15^{e} Régiment de Chasseurs (15^{e} RCh), Thierville-sur-Meuse, (with AML-60 and AML-90)
    - 41^{e} Groupe de Chasseurs (41^{e} GC), Reims
    - 164^{e} Régiment d'Infanterie (164^{e} RI), Verdun
    - 160^{e} Compagnie du Génie (160e CG), Charleville-Mézières
    - 170^{e} Compagnie du Génie (170e CG), Charleville-Mézières
  - 61^{e} Circonscription Militaire de Défense
    - 26^{e} Régiment d'Infanterie (Réserve) (26^{e} RI), Pont-Saint-Vincent
  - 62^{e} Circonscription Militaire de Défense
    - 37^{e} Régiment d'Infanterie (Réserve) (37^{e} RI), Sarrebourg
  - 63^{e} Circonscription Militaire de Défense
    - 106^{e} Régiment d'Infanterie (Réserve) (106^{e} RI), Sedan
  - 64^{e} Circonscription Militaire de Défense
    - 10^{e} Régiment d'Infanterie (Réserve) (10^{e} RI), Digoin
  - 65^{e} Circonscription Militaire de Défense
    - 60^{e} Régiment d'Infanterie (Réserve) (60^{e} RI), Valdahon

== Detached Units ==
=== French Air Force ===
The Army provided two engineer regiments to the Armée de l'Air.

- 15^{e} Régiment du Génie de l'Air (15^{e} RGA), Toul
- 25^{e} Régiment du Génie de l'Air (25^{e} RGA), Compiègne

=== French Forces in Germany ===
Tri-service Peacetime command for all French Forces in Germany.

- French Forces in Germany, Baden-Baden
  - 50^{e} Régiment de Transmission (50^{e} RT), Baden-Baden
  - 20^{e} Régiment du Train (20^{e} RT), Baden-Baden

=== Foreign Intelligence Service ===
The Directorate-General for External Security (DGSE) is the foreign intelligence service of the French state. It acts in the interest of the government and not as a military intelligence, but it is subordinated to the Ministry of Defence as an independent military service. In 1989 the military intelligence function was carried out by the 2nd Department of the French General Staff (2^{e} Bureau) and the Center for Exploitation of Military Intelligence Data (Centre d’exploitation du renseignement militaire). They were eventually merged in 1992 into the current Direction du renseignement militaire)

- Directorate-General for External Security, Paris
  - 44e Régiment d'Infanterie (44^{e} RI), Cercottes - the 44^{e} RI has a solely administrative function, acting as the parent unit of military personnel of the DGSE involved in intelligence data processing and analysis. In 1986 the previous 89^{e} Bataillon de Services received this new designation.
  - 11^{e} Régiment Parachutiste de Choc (11^{e} RPC), Cercottes - a covert intelligence gathering, sabotage and direct action parachute assault unit subordinated to the DGSE's Action Division. Formed in 1985 after the Rainbow Warrior case and the reorganisation of the DGSE's special operations forces. The 11th Parachute Assault Regiment re-formed through the amalgamation of the CINC at Aspretto Naval Air Base and the Specialised Parachute Training Center (Centre parachutiste d'entraînement spécialisé (CPES), previously designated Parachute Reservists Training Center - Centre d'entraînement des réservistes parachutistes (CERP)). The 11th PAR used the CPES garrison infrastructure at Cercottes in the vicinity of Orléans – Bricy Air Base.
  - Maritime Operations Parachutist Training Center (Centre parachutiste d'entraînement aux opérations maritimes (CPEOM), Quélern - combat diver unit under DGSE's Action Division, established in 1985 through the reorganisation of the Combat Divers Training Center (Centre d'instruction de nageurs de combat (CINC)) at the Aspretto Naval Air Base in Ajaccio, Corsica after the Rainbow Warrior case. Unlike the CINC, which was part of the 11th Parachute Assault Regiment's predecessor, the CPEOM came directly under the Action Division.

=== Foreign Legion ===
- 1^{er} Régiment Etranger (1^{er} RE) administrative unit of the Foreign Legion Headquarters in Aubagne

== See also ==
- Structure of the French Army for the current structure of the French Army
- NATO Northern Army Group wartime structure in 1989. NORTHAG would have been reinforced by the French III Corps and the Force d'Action Rapide in the event of hostilities
- NATO Central Army Group wartime structure in 1989. CENTAG would have been reinforced by the French I Corps and II Corps in the event of hostilities
