= TRF1 =

French towed howitzer

TRF1 Arsenal de Bourges
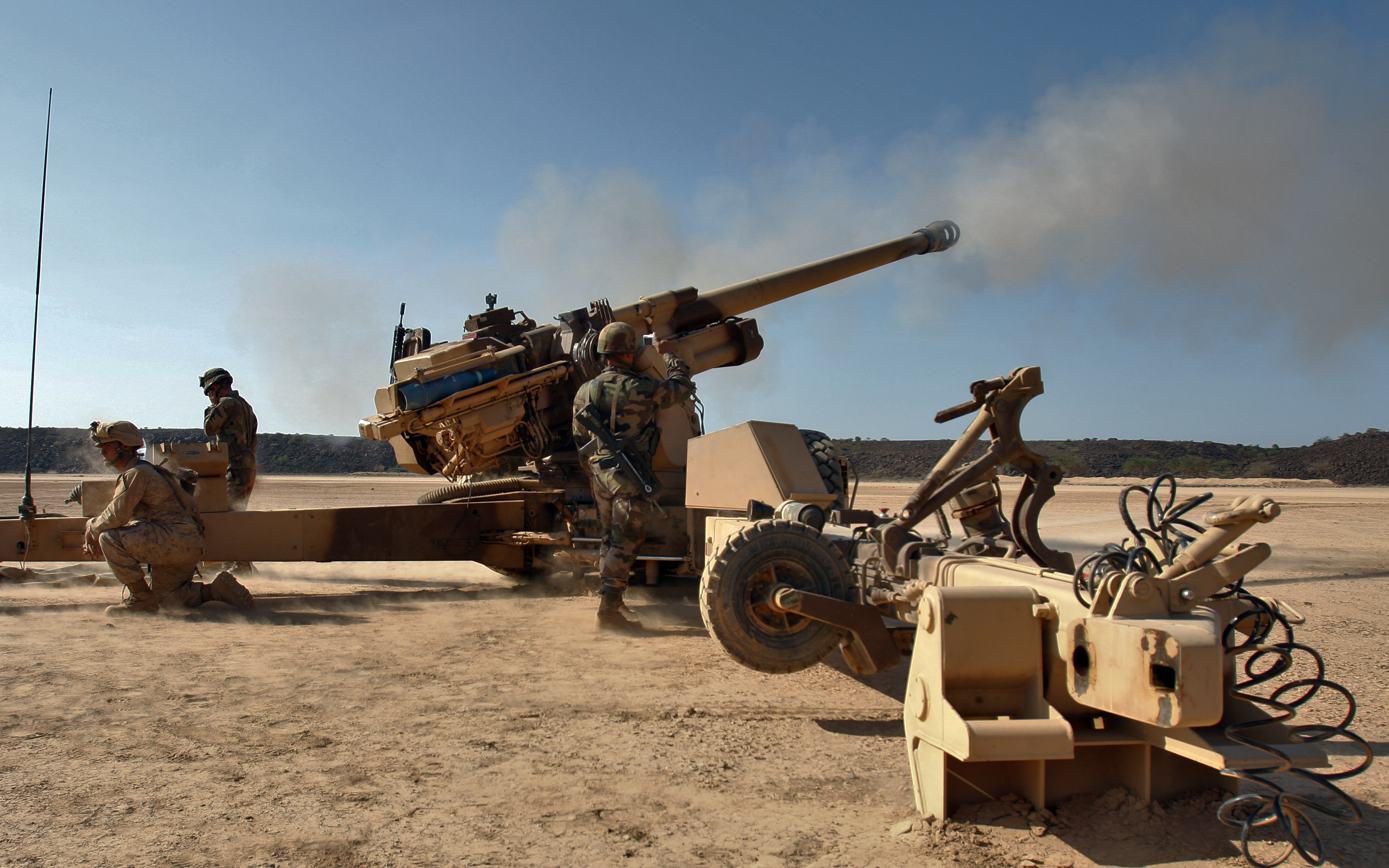
- French soldiers operating a TRF1
- Type: Towed howitzer
- Place of origin: France

Service history
- In service: 1990–present
- Used by: See Users
- Wars: Gulf War; Russo-Ukrainian War

Production history
- Manufacturer: Arsenal de Bourges

Specifications
- Mass: 10.52 t
- Length: 10.0 m (32 ft 10 in)
- Barrel length: 6.2 m (20 ft 4 in) L/40
- Width: 3.09 m (10 ft 2 in) traveling
- Height: 1.79 m (5 ft 10 in) traveling
- Crew: 8
- Calibre: 155 mm (6.1 in) NATO standard
- Carriage: wheeled Split-trail
- Elevation: −6° to +66°
- Traverse: 27° left / 38° right
- Rate of fire: 3 shots in 15 s., 6 shots/min. (because it is necessary to let the tube cool down)
- Effective firing range: 24 km (15 mi) with high-explosive shells 30 km (19 mi) with long-range ammunition

The TRF1, originally known as GIAT 155 mm Tracté (TR) is a 155mm French towed howitzer produced by Nexter (ex Giat Industries) and used by the French Army.

The TRF1 was showcased in 1979 at the Eurosatory arms trade show, as a replacement for the army's BF-50. Giat produced it from 1984 to 1993.

== Performance ==
- Setting out of battery: 2 min
- Crossing of slopes of 60%, fords of 1.20m.
- Horizontal field of fire: 445mil to the left, 675mil to the right.
- Hydraulic aiming

== Ammunition ==
- Capacity of tractor: 56 rounds, 32 on pallets and 24 in racks.
- Can fire all 155 mm ammunition (the normal ammunition is the high-explosive shell).
- Casings are combustible, which improves rate of fire: there is nothing to extract before reloading.

== Combat history ==
The TRF1 was used in combat by Ukrainian Ground Forces during the 2022 invasion of Ukraine. Photographic evidence shows that at least one TRF1 was destroyed in combat near Lyman.

== Operators ==
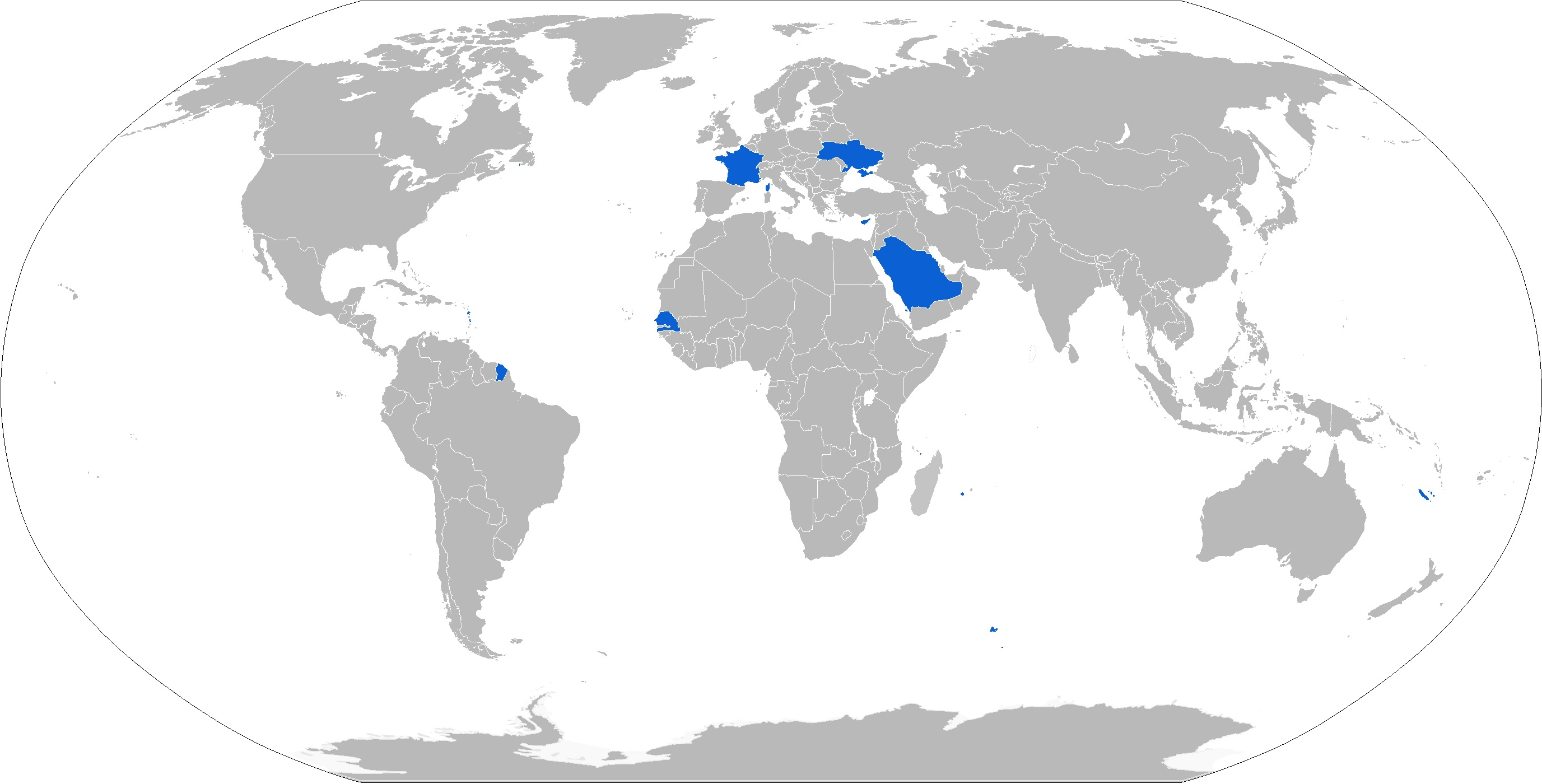
Map of TRF1 operators in blue

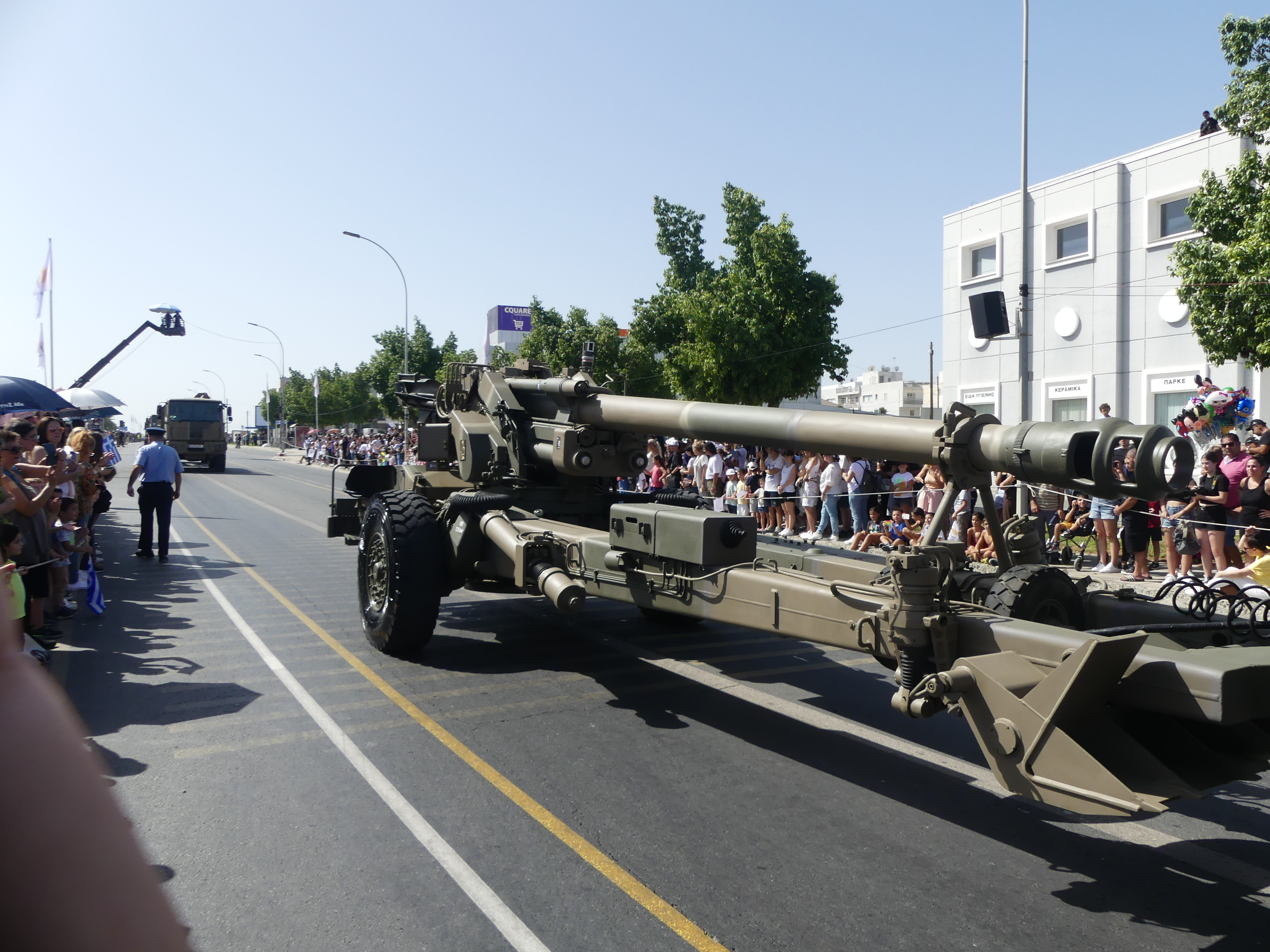
A TRF1 of the Cypriot National Guard.

=== Current operators ===
- Cyprus – 12 delivered in 1991
- Saudi Arabia – 28 delivered in 1990–1991
- Senegal – 8 delivered in 2011
- Ukraine – 6 ex-French Army guns bought in September 2022

=== Former operators ===
- France – 105 or 106 delivered, last retired in April 2022

== See also ==
- Soltam M-71 – (Israel)
- G5 howitzer – (South Africa)
