= Obusier de 155 mm Modèle 50 =

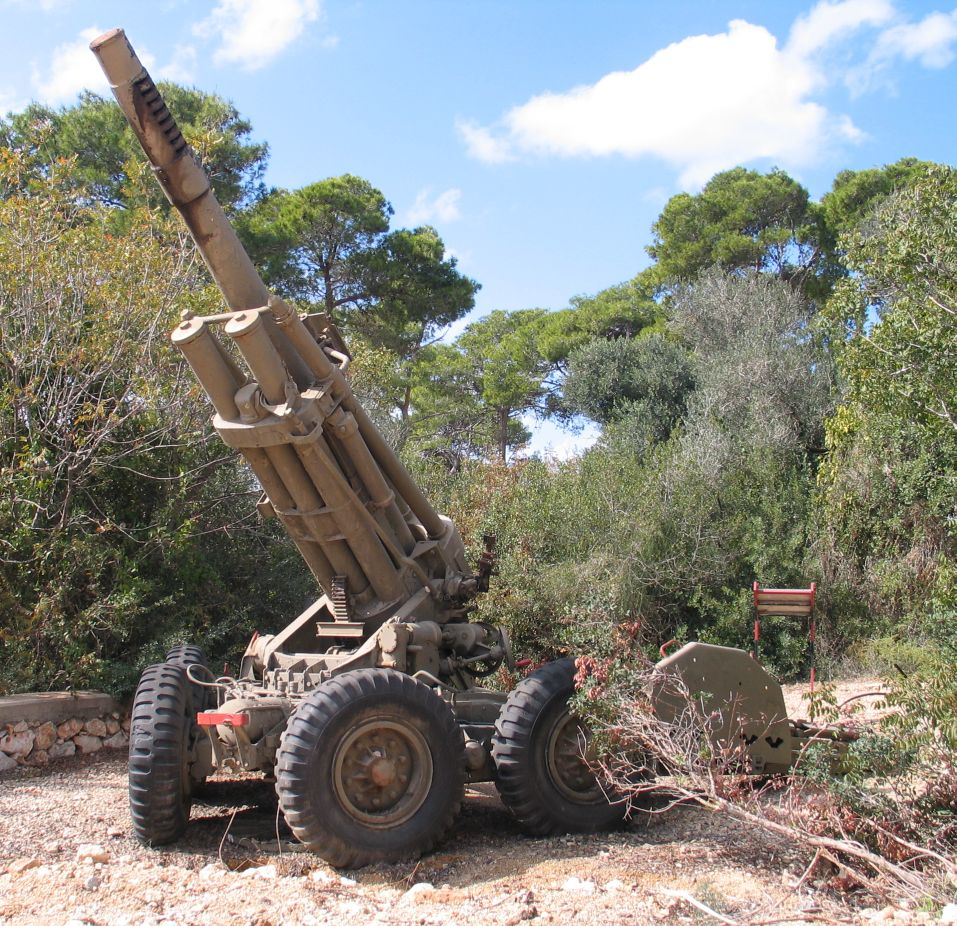
- Obusier de 155 mm Modèle 50 in Beyt ha-Totchan Museum, Zikhron Ya'akov.
- Type: Field howitzer
- Place of origin: France

Service history
- In service: 1952-1990s
- Used by: See Operators

Specifications
- Mass: 8,100 kg (17,900 lb)
- Length: 7.8 m (25 ft 7 in)
- Barrel length: 4.65 m (15 ft 3 in) L/30
- Width: 2.7 m (8 ft 10 in)
- Height: 2.5 m (8 ft 2 in)
- Crew: 11
- Shell: Separate loading charge and projectile
- Caliber: 155 mm (6.1 in)
- Breech: interrupted screw
- Recoil: Hydro-pneumatic
- Carriage: Split trail
- Elevation: -4°/69°
- Traverse: 80°
- Rate of fire: 3-4 rpm
- Muzzle velocity: 650 m/s (2,100 ft/s)
- Effective firing range: 18,000 m (20,000 yd)
- Maximum firing range: 23,300 m (25,500 yd)

Obusier de 155 mm Modèle 50 was a French 155 mm 30 calibre howitzer introduced in 1952. The first French artillery designed since World War II, it was manufactured in both France - 980 howitzers were produced (French army and export) - and under license in Sweden for the Swedish armed forces. The Model 50 was replaced in French service during the 1980s by the TRF1. Reserve units were produced until the end of the 1990s.

== Description ==
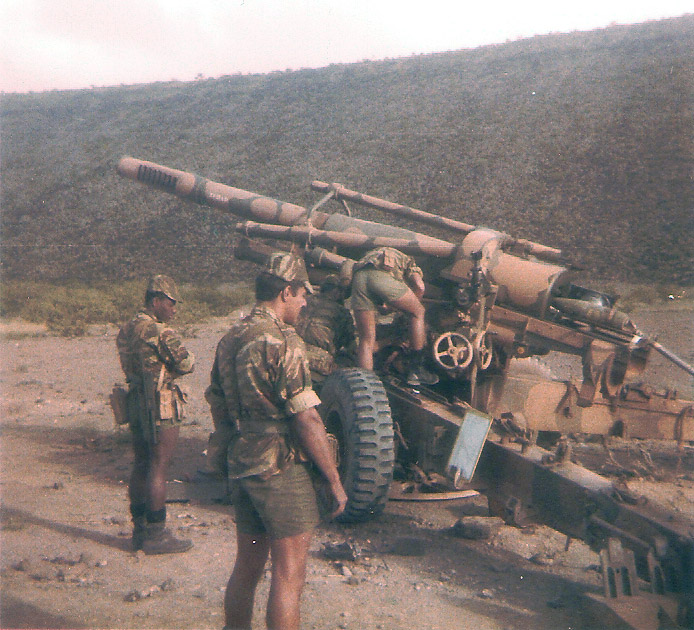
French Obusier de 155 mm Modèle 50 in Djibouti in 1979.

The Model 50 has a split trail, large slotted muzzle-brake, four-wheeled bogie and a retractable firing pedestal beneath the axles.

== Operators ==
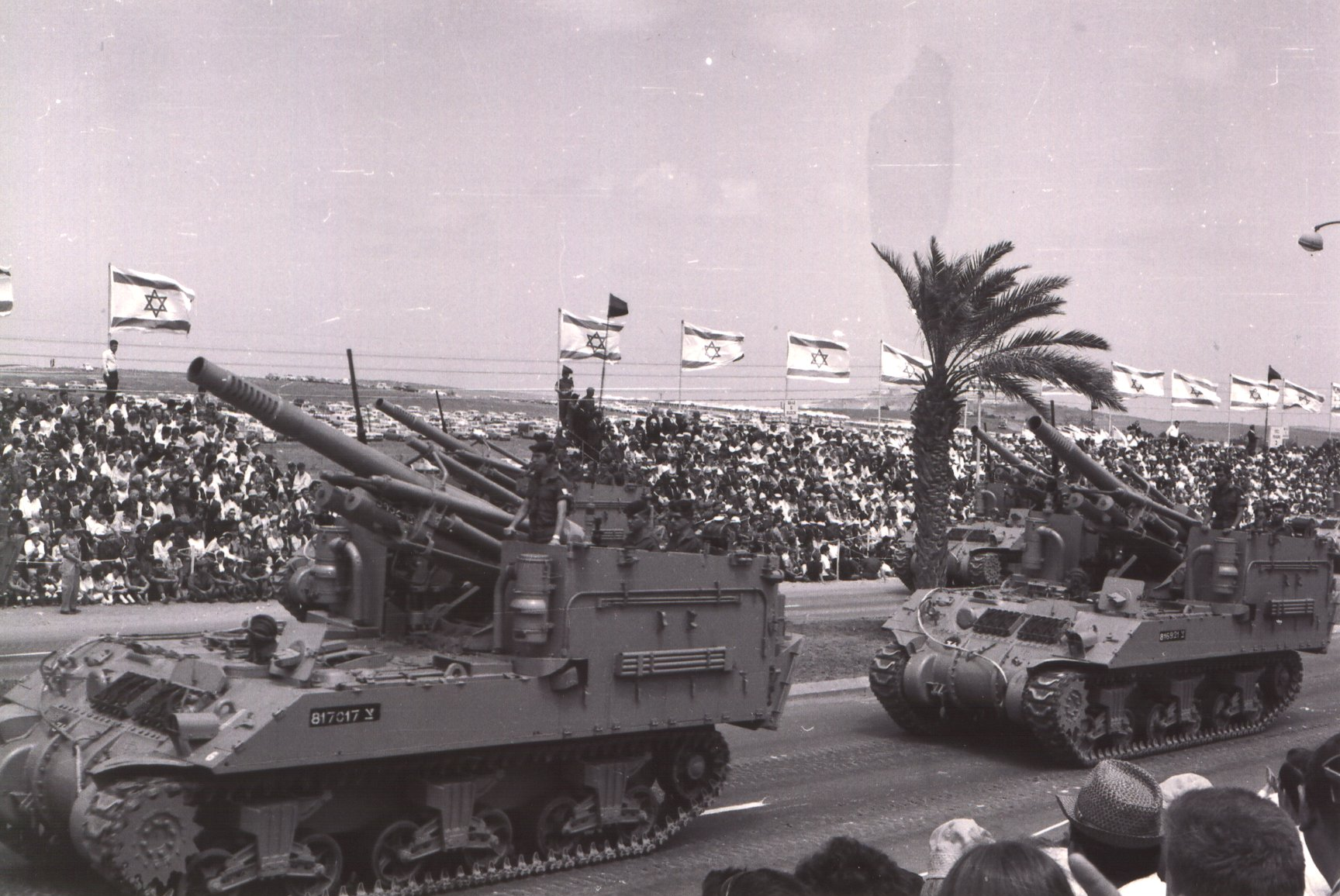
IDF M50 155 mm self-propelled howitzer

- France: standard howitzer of the French Army, replaced in the late 1980s by the TRF1.
- Sweden: 170; possibly more produced under license.
- Israel: 170; most of these were later mounted on an M4 Sherman tank chassis as self-propelled howitzers.
- Lebanon: 50
- Morocco: 18
- Senegal: 6
- Switzerland: 20
- Tunisia: 30

== See also ==
- M-50 155 mm - An M4 Sherman chassis based self-propelled artillery piece mounting the Obusier de 155 mm Modèle 50 155 mm L/30 howitzer in large enclosed superstructure.
