= AMX-30 AuF1 =

French 155 mm self-propelled howitzer

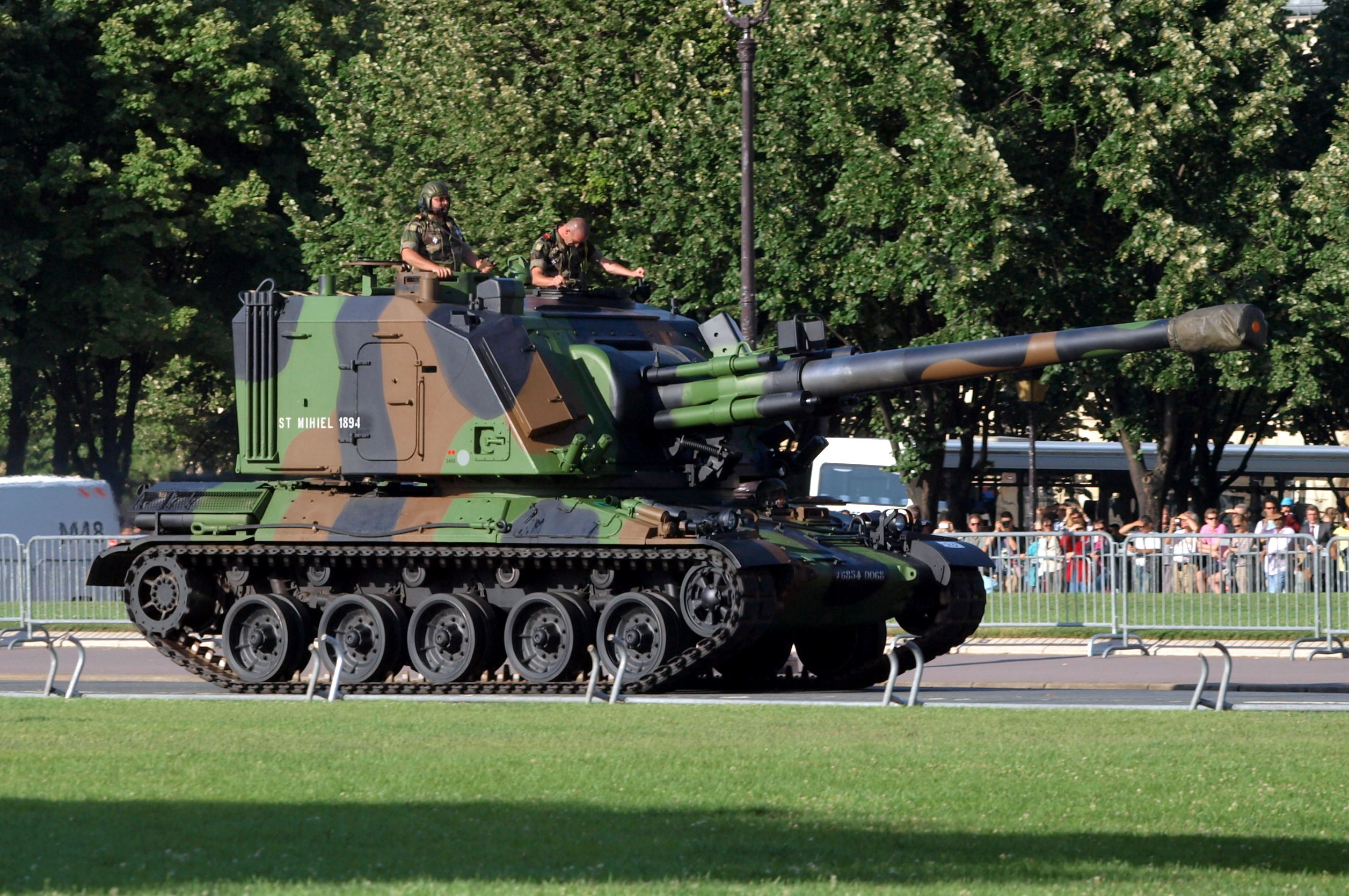
- GCT 155mm self-propelled artillery of the French Army
- Type: Self-propelled gun
- Place of origin: France

Service history
- In service: 1977–present
- Used by: France, Saudi Arabia and Kuwait
- Wars: Iran–Iraq War; Gulf War; Yugoslav Wars

Production history
- Designer: GIAT Industries
- Designed: 1972 (prototype)
- Manufacturer: Nexter
- Produced: 1977–1995
- No. built: 400

Specifications
- Mass: 41.949 tonnes to 43.5 tonnes (42.8 long tons; 48.0 short tons)
- Length: 10.25 m
- Width: 3.15 m
- Height: 3.25 m
- Crew: 4; Commander, Driver, Gunner and Loader
- Armor: 20 mm (turret)
- Main armament: 1× 155 mm CN 155 AUF1 howitzer
- Secondary armament: 1× Browning M2 12.7mm heavy machine gun
- Engine: Hispano-Suiza HS-110 Renault-Mack E9 (AuF1 TA); 680 hp at 2400 RPM 750 hp at 2400 RPM (AuF1 TA)
- Suspension: torsion bar
- Operational range: 420–500 km
- Maximum speed: 60 km/h on-road.

The AMX-30 AuF1 is a French self-propelled gun vehicle currently in use by the army of Saudi Arabia. It replaced the former Mk F3 155mm in French Army service. The AuF1 primary advantage is that it incorporates full armor and nuclear-biological-chemical (NBC) protection for its crew of four, while the former Mk F3 155mm offered no protection and could carry only two of its four crew members. The AuF1 saw combat with the Iraqi Army in the Iran–Iraq War.

== AuF1 ==
The CN 155 AuF1 (Canon de 155 Automoteur Modèle F1, meaning "155 mm self-propelled gun model F1") is based on the AMX-30 main battle tank (MBT) chassis and equipped with a NATO-standard 155mm 39-caliber (L/39) gun with a bustle-mounted autoloader, giving a rate of fire of 8 rounds per minute. It is also equipped with a roof-mounted 12.7mm anti-aircraft gun. The AUF1 has an effective range of 23,000 meters firing conventional rounds and 28,000 meters using Rocket Assisted Projectiles (RAPs).

== Variants and upgrades ==
- AuF1 "experimental": pre-production model tested by the French field corps in 1979. They can be recognized by the lack of louver on the right front part of the turret. One of the six was also fitted with a bore evacuator. The six were later upgraded to the H standard.
- AuF1 H: this designation appeared when the AuF1 T was introduced in order to distinguish the two models. The AuF1 H is fitted with a Citroën AZ 5.4 hp auxiliary power unit (APU) mounted under armor.
- AuF1 T: also known as CTI (Conduite de Tir Inertielle; inertial fire control system), it is fitted with an inertial navigation system linked to the main gun fire control system. The Citroën AZ APU is replaced by a Gévaudan micro-gas turbine, the latter required a more curved glacis plate.
- AuF1 TM: also known as T-MODEX (MODule EXpérimental; "experimental module") 24 were made and were used to test the implementation of the ATLAS system. The AuF1 TM were only used by the 40th artillery regiment.
- AuF1 TA: TA stands for Tourelle ATLAS (ATLAS turret), they were built on AMX-30B2 chassis (which featured stronger torsion bar) using the more powerful Renault-Mack E9 diesel engine. As this new engine was taller, a new 12 cm turret ring was fitted in order to raise up the turret. Unlike the previous variants, the AuF1 TM lacks APU and uses buffer batteries.
- AU F2: proposed upgrade from the 1990s. Increased range (40 km) and rate of fire (10 rnds/min) is accomplished by having a longer L/52 gun as well as an improved autoloader using modular artillery propelling charges.

== Operational history ==
A battery of 8 AuF1s from the French Army's 40e régiment d'artillerie was deployed in support of the Rapid Reaction Force on Mount Igman during the 1995 NATO bombing campaign in Bosnia and Herzegovina. The battery provided rapid counter-battery fire against Serb artillery units during the siege of Sarajevo, the long range of its guns allowing it to dominate the surrounding terrain.

AuF1 in IFOR service in 1995–1996
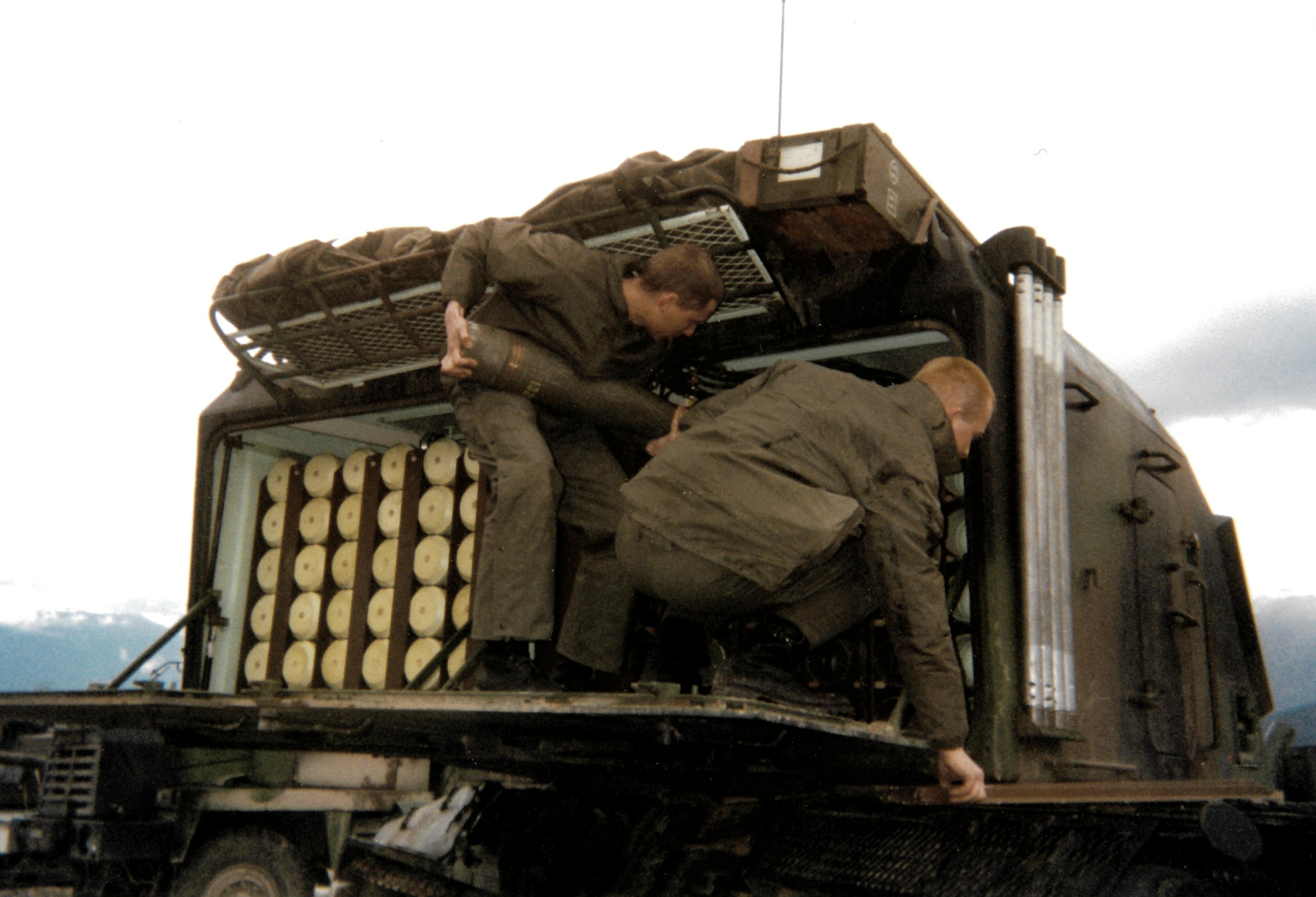
Soldiers loading shells in the ammunition racks at the rear of the turret, near Mostar

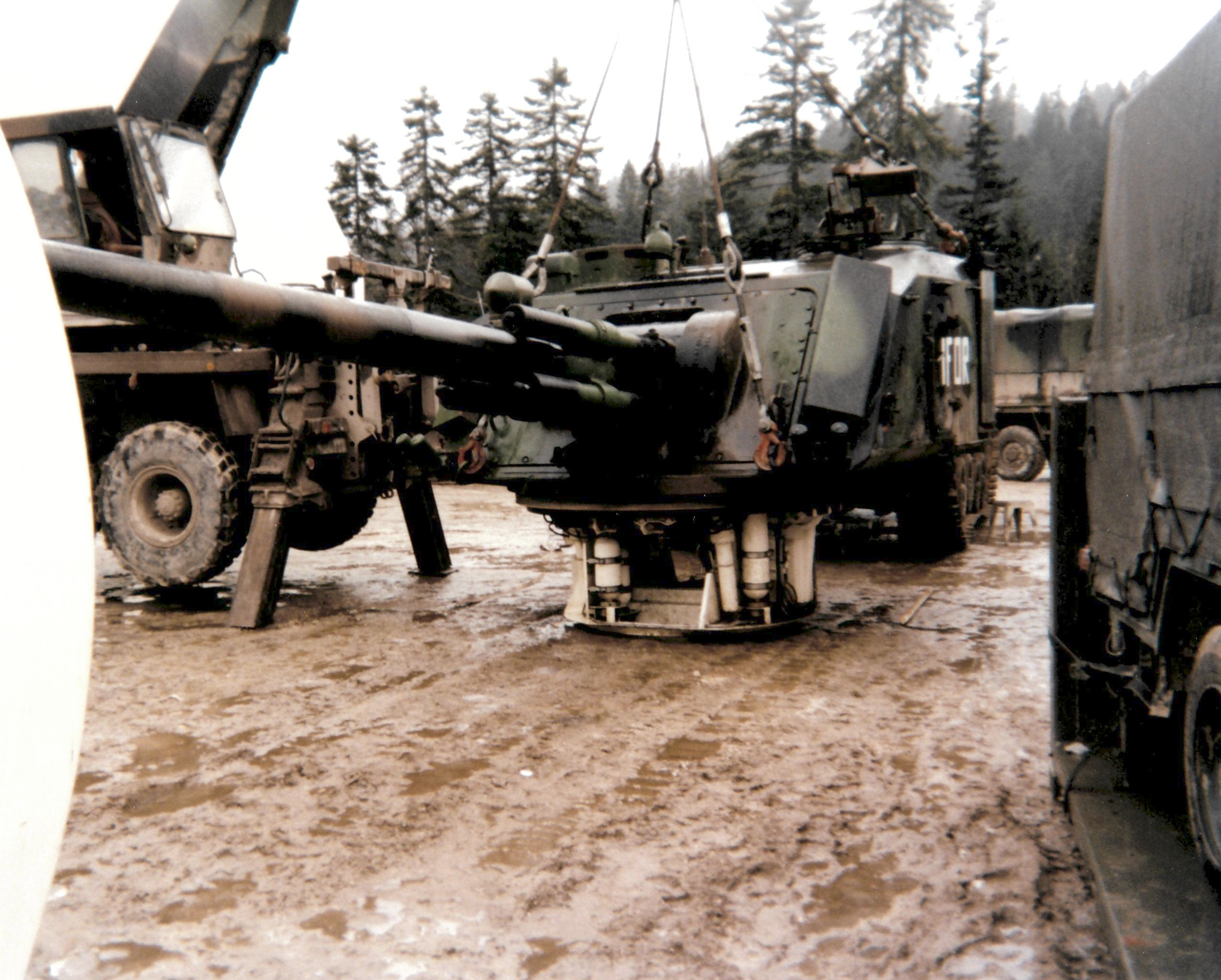
Turret removed from the tank hull for maintenance

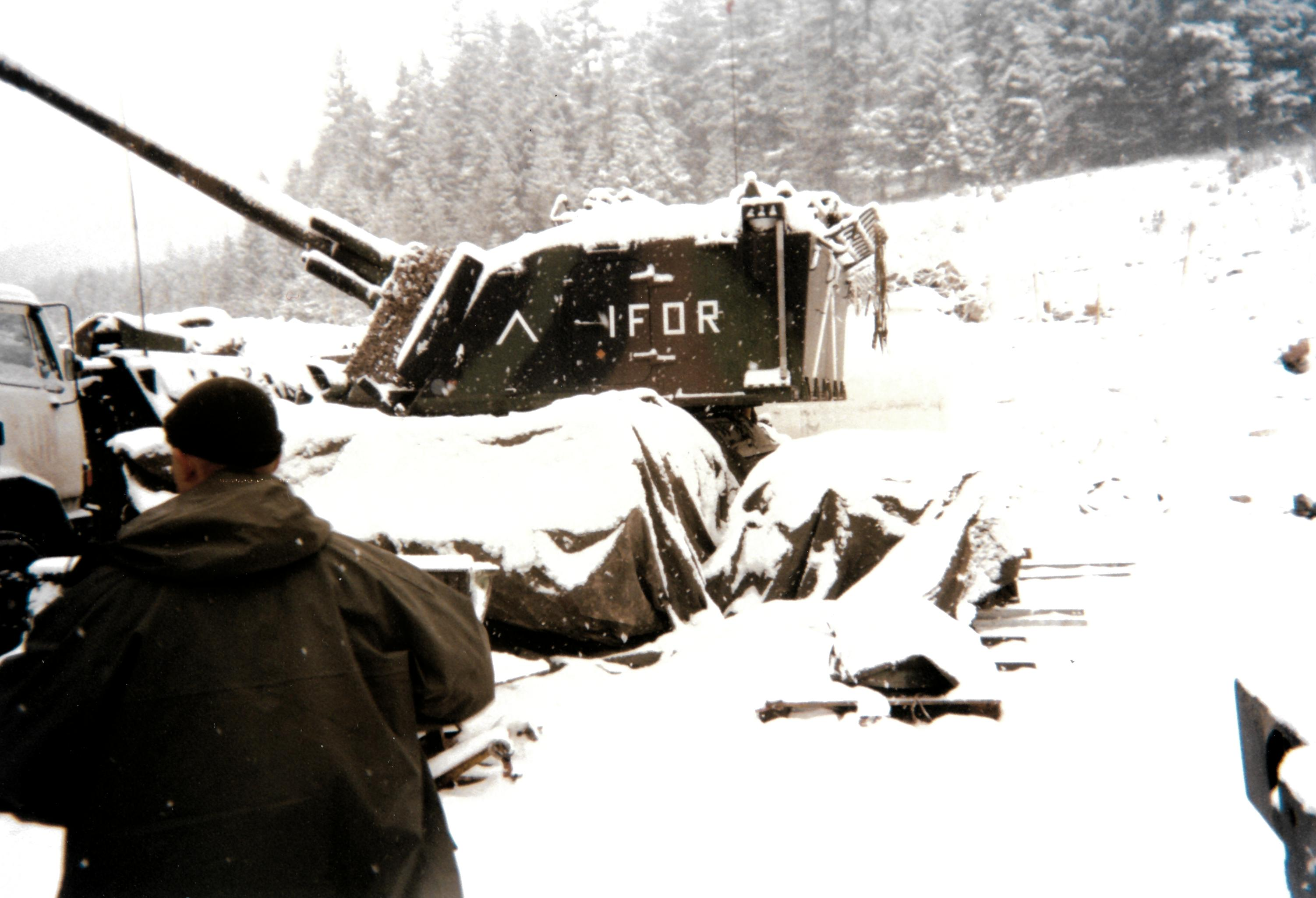
French AuF1 howitzer of the 32nd Artillery Regiment with IFOR markings being serviced near the installations of the 1984 Winter Olympics at Sarajevo

== Operators ==
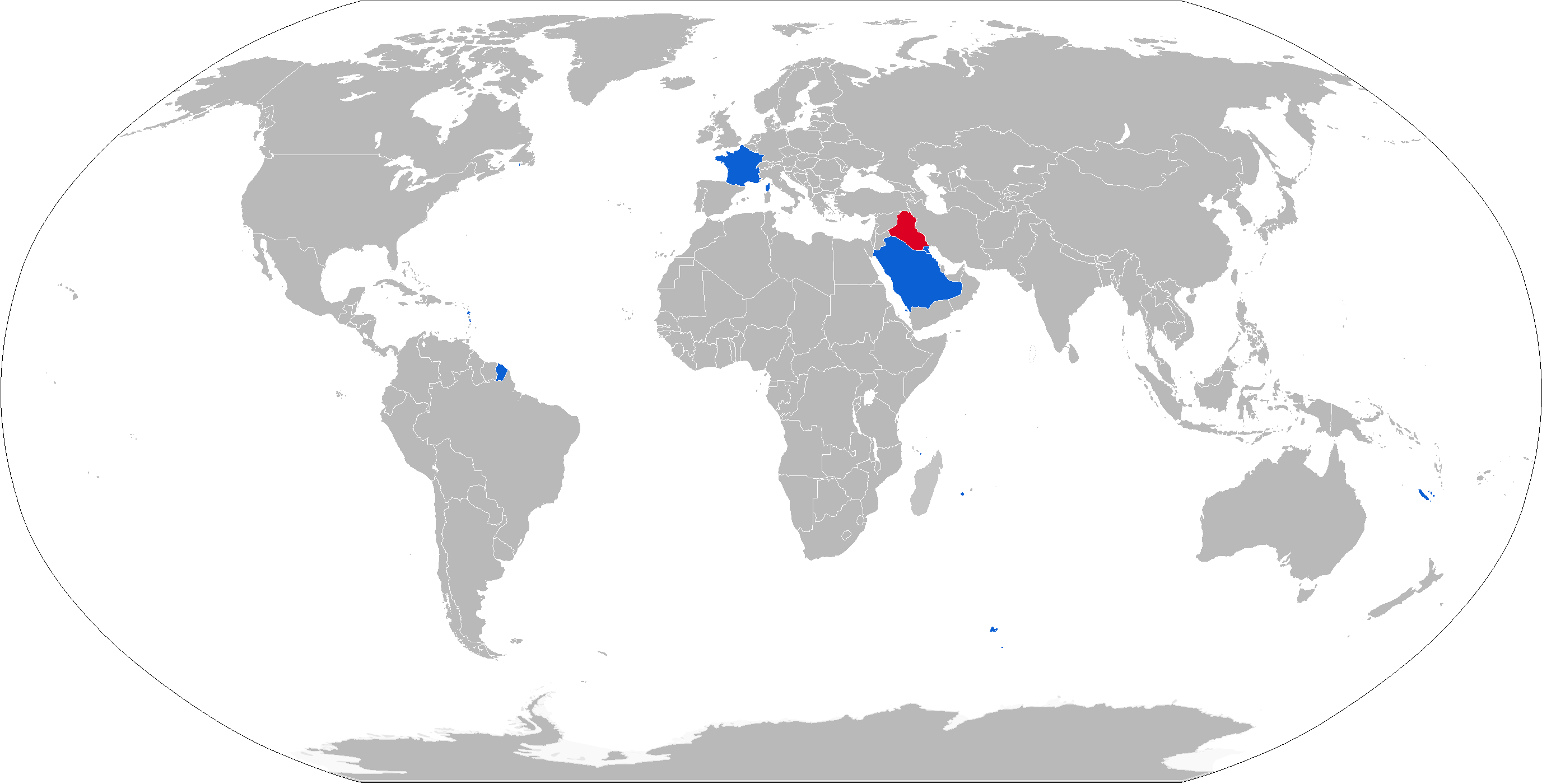
GCT 155 mm operators: Current Former

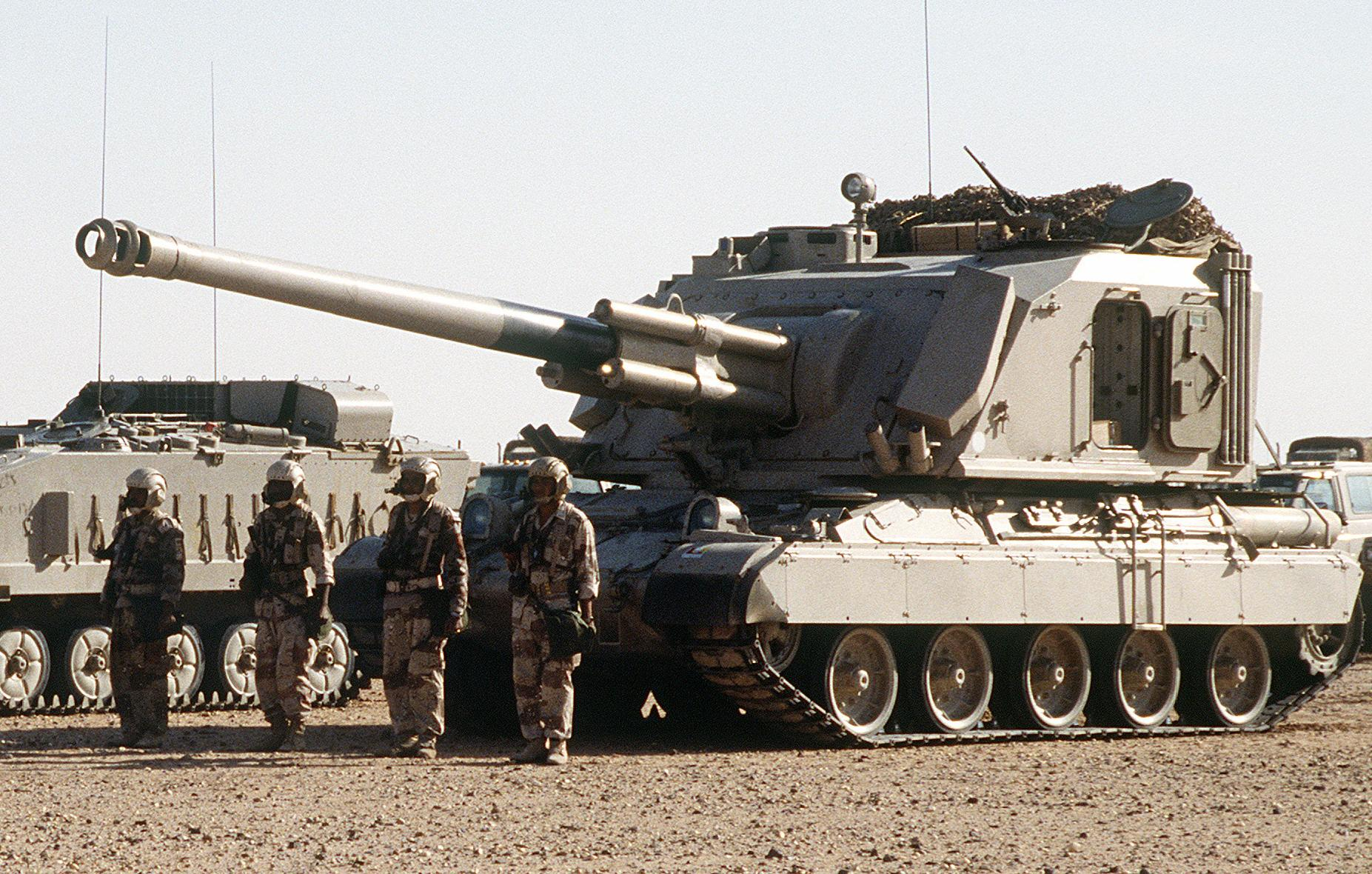
GCT 155 mm used by Saudi Arabian Military.

=== Current operators ===
- Saudi Arabia – 60 in service as of 2024. At least 51 purchased from France in 1975.

=== Former operators ===
- Kuwait – 18 purchased from France in 1991.
- Iraq – 85-86 received between 1983 and 1985, kept in storage.
- France – Out of service in 2025. 273 units previously in service. 40 active units in storage december 2025
