= Rapid Action Force (France) =

Force d'Action Rapide
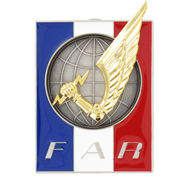
- Insignia
- Active: 1984-1999
- Country: France
- Branch: French Army
- Type: Army Corps
- Size: 47,000

The Rapid Action Force (French: Force d'action rapide (FAR)) was an army corps of the French Army, created on 1 July 1984 during the reorganization of the later within the law n°83-606 of 8 July 1983 bearing approbation of the military programming for the years 1984 to 1988; the force would have been in means to deploy in Central-Europe and exterior theaters of operations in case of crisis undergone in intermediary conflicts. The force was dissolved in 1999.

During the 1980s, the FAR was the third pillar of the French Army with the 1st Army and the Défense opérationnelle du territoire (Territorial Defence). In the event of a Warsaw Pact offensive, the FAR's mission was to commit French units to Germany as quickly and as far forward as possible, prioritizing mobility over firepower. The FAR's airmobile component could have been tasked to countering a Soviet operational maneuver group - an autonomous force group equivalent to two to three armored divisions, operating ahead of the main Warsaw Pact forces in the form of a raid toward the Rhine.

In the context of the Cold War, the FAR was intended to demonstrate that the French Army would participate in the defence of Western Europe, and not merely as a reserve force, without this being automatic or requiring it to come under the command of the North Atlantic Treaty Organization (NATO) in peacetime.

The FAR comprised 47,000 men in five divisions dispersed throughout metropolitan France, 240 combat and utility helicopters, 216 armored vehicles (72 AMX 10 RC, 72 ERC 90 Sagaie and 72 Panhard AML), 200 artillery tubes, 5000 man-portable anti-tank systems and anti-tank missiles in 1990.

One of its division, the 6th Light Armoured Division, was reorganised as the Division Daguet and deployed to Saudi Arabia after the Iraqi invasion of Kuwait. It then fought in the Gulf War.

When the FAR was finally disestablished in 1999, the constituent divisions were reduced in size and retitled as brigades. The 4th Airmobile Division was dissolved on 30 June 1999 during the professionalization of the French Army, with the 4th Airmobile Brigade (4e brigade aéromobile (4e BAM)), created the next day, 1 July 1999, taking up its history and traditions.

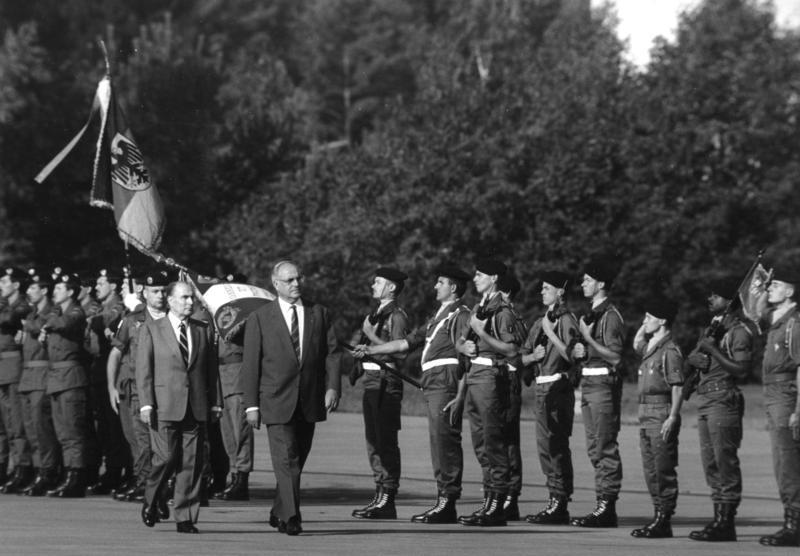
The President François Mitterrand and Chancellor Helmut Kohl passing review of the troops of the Force d'action rapide stationed in Baden-Württemberg, on 24 September 1987 during a Franco-German manoeuver.

== Principal formations ==
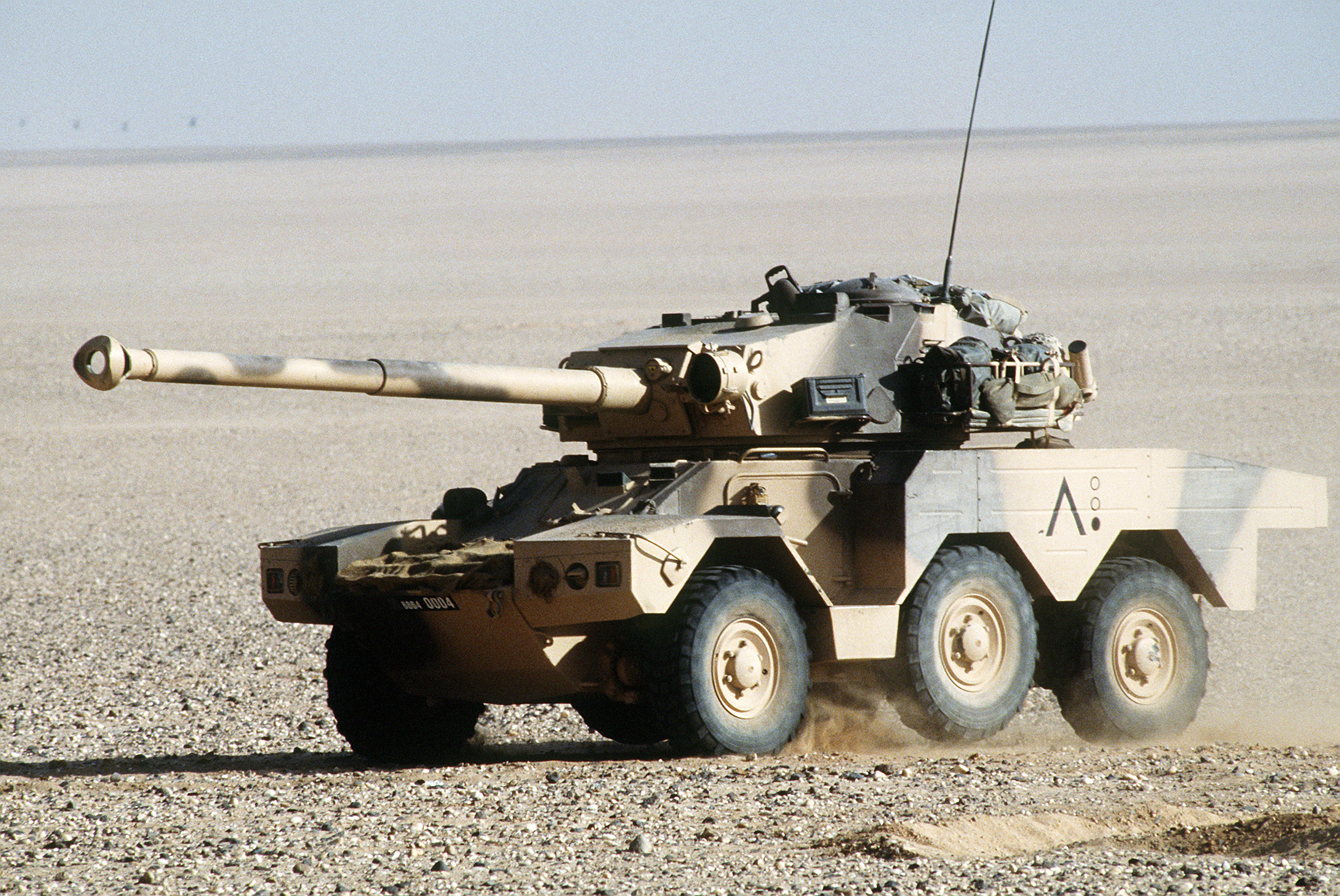
A French Panhard ERC 90 armoured car of Division Daguet moves across the desert as part of a display of Allied armor during Operation Desert Shield.

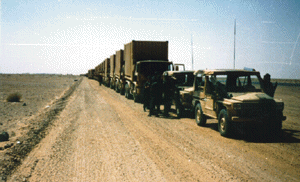
Logistics Convoy of the 511e Regiment du Train of Operation Daguet.

- 4th Airmobile Division
- 6th Light Armoured Division
- 9th Marine Infantry Division
- 11th Parachute Division
- 27th Alpine Division
- FAR Logistics Brigade
- 19th Artillery Brigade
- 28th Transmission regiment
- 68th Artillery Regiment

== Commandants ==
- 1984-1985 : Général de corps d'armée Gilbert Forray
- 1986-1988 : général de corps d'armée Paul Lardry
- 1988-xxxx : général de corps d'armée Henry Préaud
- 1989-1990 : général de brigade Jacques Vidal
- 1990-xxxx : général de corps d'armée Michel Roquejeoffre
- 1993-1994 : général de corps d’armée Bertrand Guillaume de Sauville de Lapresle
- 1994-1996 : général de corps d'armée Philippe Morillon
- 1996-1999 : général de corps d'armée Jacques Bâton

== See also ==
- Structure of the French Army in 1989
