= Division Daguet =

French Army division

The Division Daguet was a French Army division formed in September 1990 in Saudi Arabia as part of France's contribution to Operation Desert Shield. The French military contribution to the allied cause to liberate Kuwait from Iraqi occupation was named Opération Daguet and its ground part was subsequently named Division Daguet. In French "Daguet" is a young brocket deer.

In 1991 the division participated in Operation Desert Storm guarding the left flank of the allied advance. After Iraq surrendered the division's units returned to France and the division itself was disbanded on 30 April 1991.

== History ==
After the Iraqi invasion of Kuwait in August 1990 the United States and its allies began to deploy forces to Saudi Arabia to protect the country from a feared Iraqi invasion. As Iraq's dictator Saddam Hussein refused to remove his forces from Kuwait the United Nations Security Council accepted UNSC Resolution 678, which authorized UN member nations in to evict Iraqi forces from Kuwait with force after 15 January 1991.

France had already dispatched troops to Saudi Arabia in September 1990 to help deter Iraq from further military adventures, but with war drawing closer, the French contingent was rapidly reinforced all through fall of 1990. Most of the initial units of the Division Daguet were drawn from the 6th Light Armoured Division (France) (6 DLB), but ultimately the division was made up mixed units from 20 regiments with troops and equipment coming from 57 regiments in total.

Initially the commander of 6th Light Armoured Division, Major General Jean-Charles Mouscardès, commanded Division Daguet, but after a medical emergency on 7 February 1991 he was replaced by Brigadier General Bernard Janvier the next day. Overall commander of French forces in Saudi Arabia and Opération Daguet was General Michel Roquejeoffre, commanding officer of the French Army's Rapid Action Force. Initially, the French operated independently under national command and control, but coordinated closely with General Schwarzkopf, Commander-in-Chief, United States Central Command, coordinating the non-Arab forces. In January, the Division was placed under the tactical control of the US XVIII Airborne Corps and reinforced for the ground war with the following units from the US Army: 2nd Brigade, 82nd Airborne Division, 18th Field Artillery Brigade, and 27th Engineer Battalion.

=== Operation Desert Storm ===
The French operated on the left flank during Opération Daguet (click to enlarge)

On 24 February 1991, the ground phase began. Reconnaissance units of Division Daguet advanced into Iraq. Three hours later, the French main body attacked. The initial objective of the division was an airfield 90 miles (140 km) inside Iraq at As-Salman. Reinforced by the US 82nd Airborne Division, the French crossed the border unopposed and attacked north. The French then came across elements of the Iraqi 45th Infantry Division. After a brief battle, supported by French Army missile-armed Aérospatiale Gazelle attack helicopters, they controlled the objective and captured 2,500 prisoners. By the end of the first day Division Daguet had secured its objectives and continued the attack north, securing the highways from Baghdad to southern Iraq.

== Division Structure ==
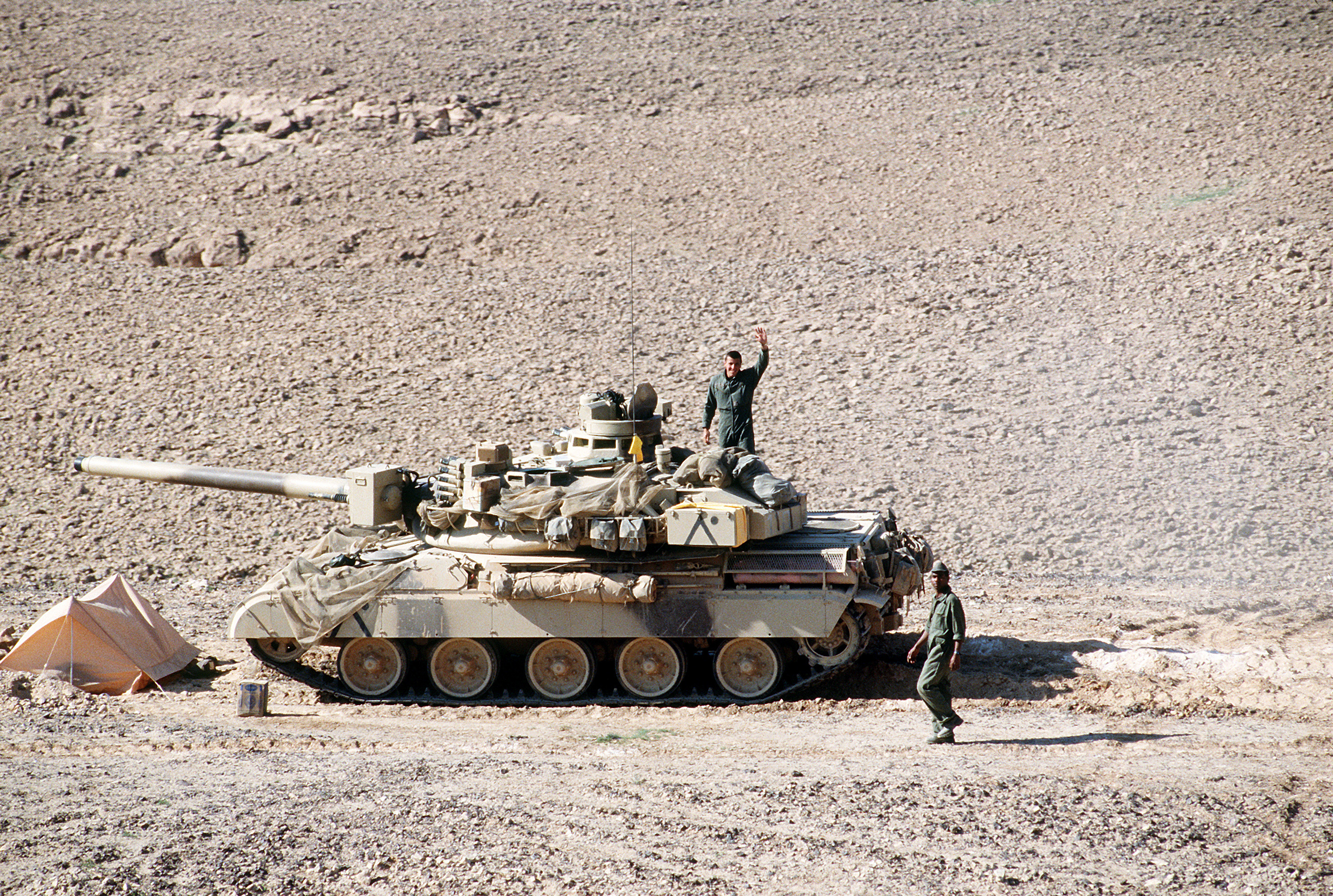
An AMX-30 B2 main battle tank from the 4^{e} Régiment de Dragons from the 10th Armoured Division

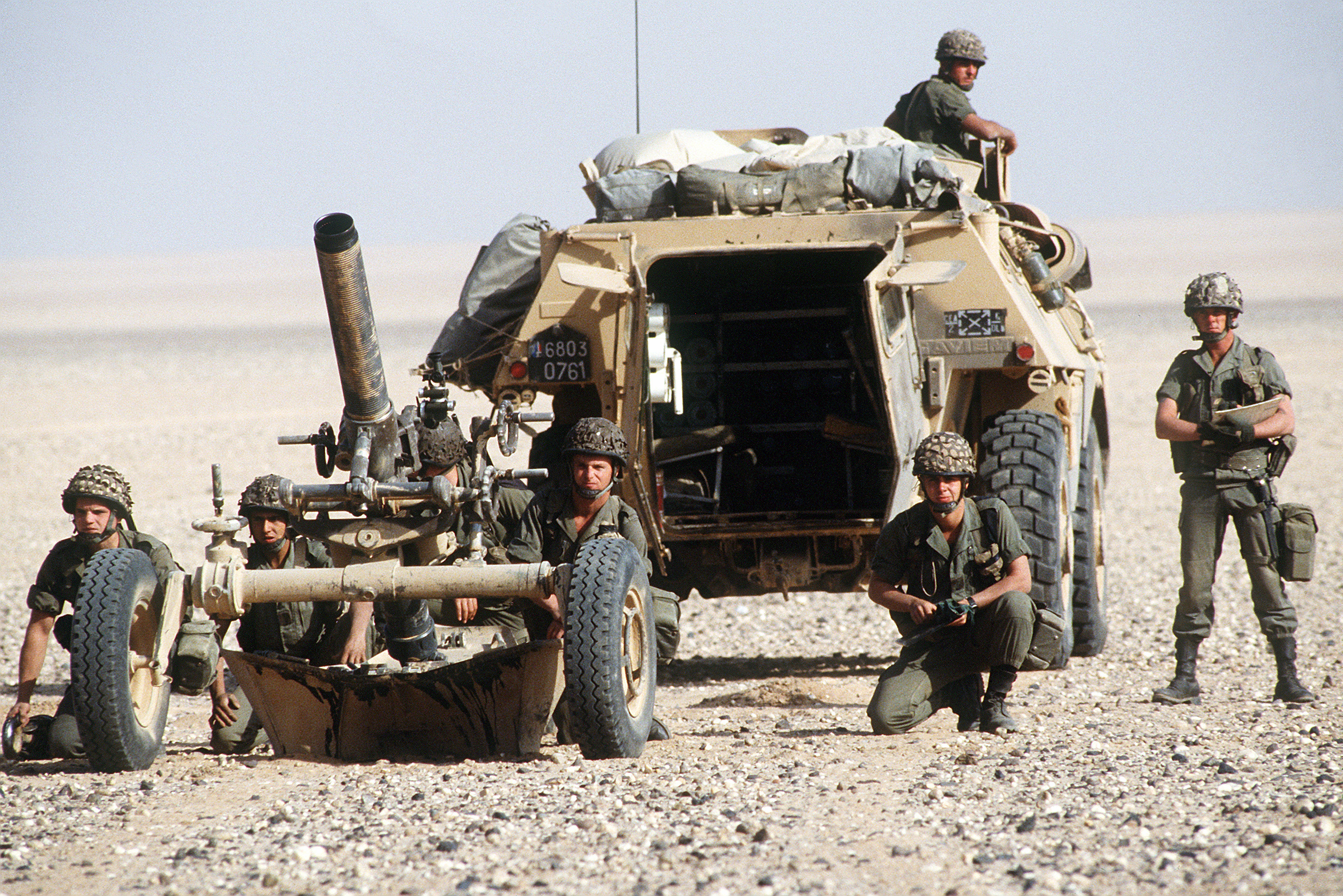
Soldiers from the 2^{e} Régiment Étranger d'Infanterie from the 6th Light Armoured Division prepare to fire a 120mm MO-120-RT-61 mortar

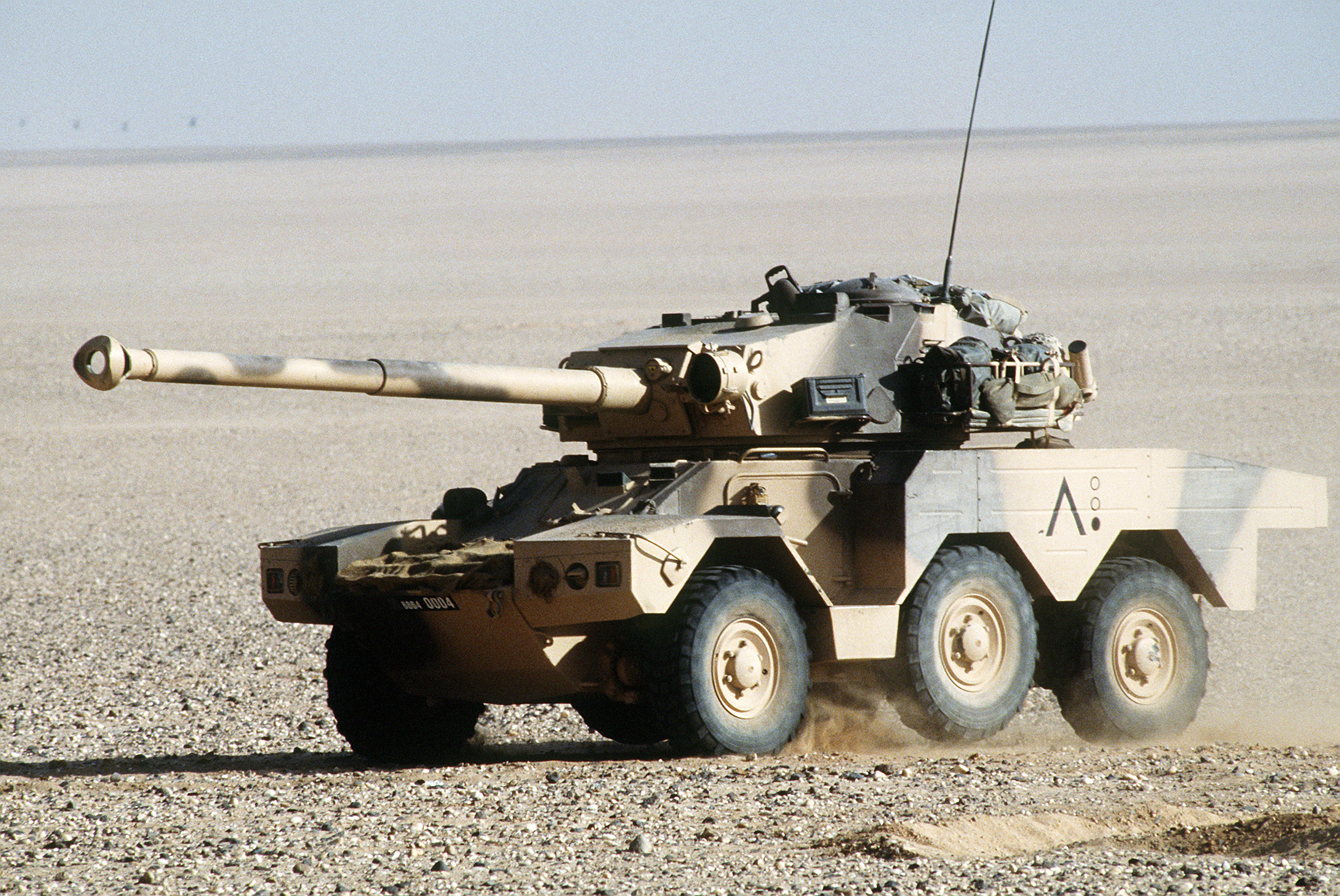
An ERC 90 Sagaie of the 1^{er} Régiment de Hussards Parachutistes from the 11th Paratrooper Division during Operation Desert Shield.

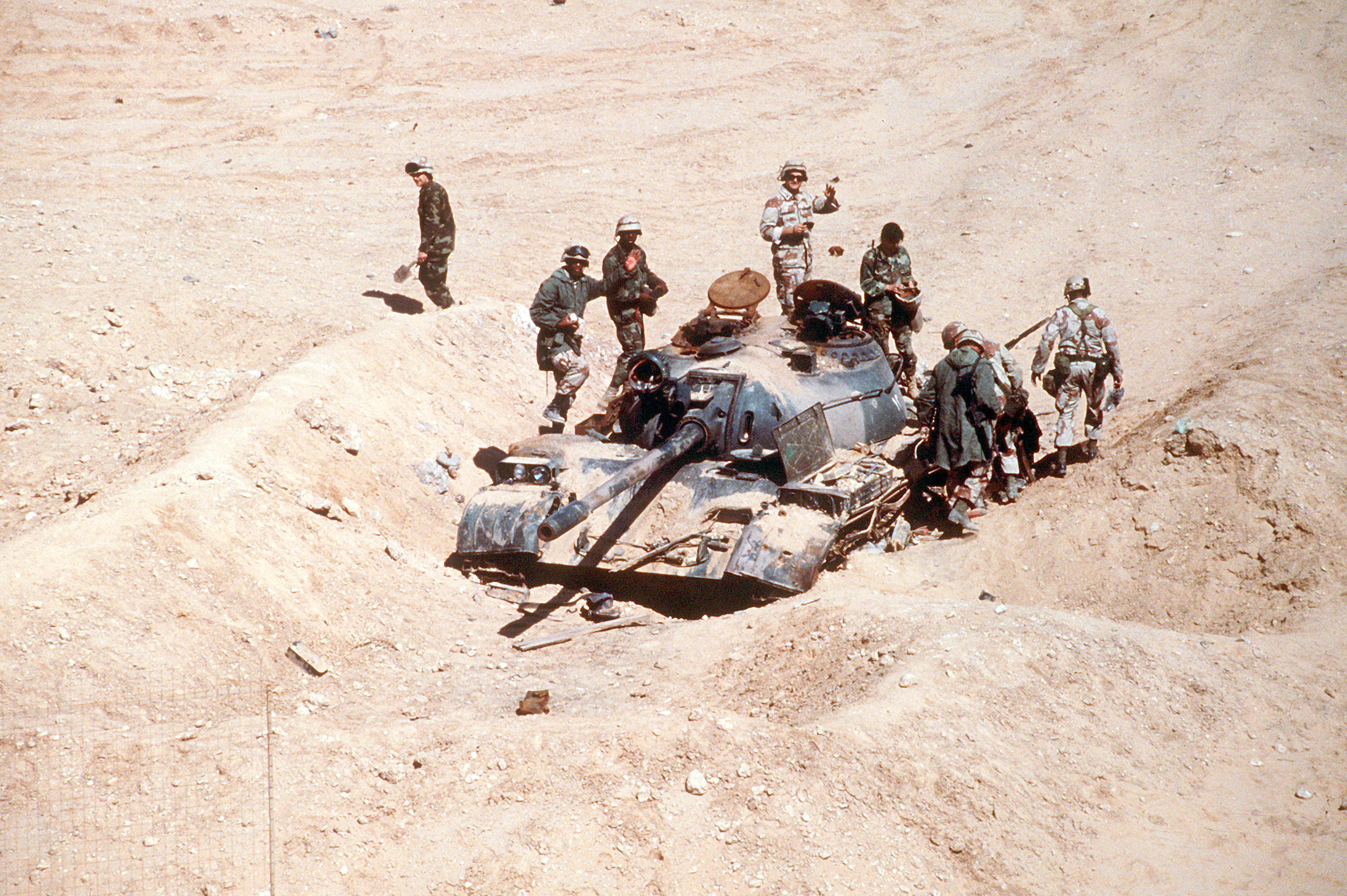
French and American soldiers inspecting an Iraqi Type 69 tank destroyed by the French Division Daguet during Operation Desert Storm.

The Division Daguet's general staff was mostly drawn from the staff heading the 6th Light Armoured Division (France) based in Nîmes. After the arrival of most units, the division was split into two tactical groups: Group West (Groupement Ouest) and Group East (Groupement Est). At the outset of hostilities the division was composed as follows:

- Division Daguet
  - 6^{e} Régiment de Commandement et de Soutien from the 6th Light Armoured Division
    - Divisional HQ company
    - 1× reconnaissance squadron from the 1^{er} Régiment de Hussards Parachutistes from the 11th Paratrooper Division with ERC 90 Sagaie
    - 1× signal company, organic to the 6^{e} Régiment de Commandement et de Soutien from the 6th Light Armoured Division
    - 1× signal company from the 54^{e} Régiment de Transmission
    - Logistic Support Group
      - 2× transport companies, organic to the 6^{e} Régiment de Commandement et de Soutien from the 6th Light Armoured Division
      - 2× transport companies from the 511^{e} Régiment du Train respectively the 602^{e} Régiment de Circulation Routière
      - 2× supply companies, from the 511^{e} Régiment du Train respectively the 516^{e} Régiment du Train
    - Medical Support Group
      - 4th Air-transportable Surgical Hospital
      - 9th Air-transportable Surgical Hospital
      - 2× medical transport companies and 1× medical supply company from medical units
      - 1× medical company organic to the 6^{e} Régiment de Commandement et de Soutien from the 6th Light Armoured Division
    - 1× CBRN defence company
    - 1× Military Police squadron from the National Gendarmerie
  - General and HQ Protection Company
  - 6× Long Range Reconnaissance/Special Forces teams from the 13^{e} Régiment de Dragons Parachutistes
  - Groupement Ouest, with units from the 6th Light Armoured Division
    - 1^{er} Régiment de Spahis
      - 3× squadrons with AMX-10RC
      - 1× anti-tank squadron with VAB/HOT
    - 1^{er} Régiment Étranger de Cavalerie
      - 3× squadrons with AMX-10RC
      - 1× anti-tank squadron with VAB/HOT
    - 2^{e} Régiment Étranger d'Infanterie
      - 3× companies with VAB APCs
      - 1× company from the 21^{e} Régiment d'Infanterie de Marine with VAB APCs
      - 1× squadron from the Régiment d'Infanterie-Chars de Marine from the 9th Marine Infantry Division with AMX-10RC
      - 1× reconnaissance squadron from the 1^{er} Régiment de Hussards Parachutistes from the 11th Paratrooper Division with ERC 90 Sagaie
    - 11^{e} Régiment d'Artillerie de Marine from the 9th Marine Infantry Division reinforced with men from the 68^{e} Régiment d'Artillerie
      - 3× batteries with towed 155mm TRF1 howitzers
      - 1× air defence battery from the 35^{e} Régiment d'Artillerie Parachutiste from the 11th Paratrooper Division with Mistral surface-to-air missiles
    - 1st Combat Helicopter Regiment from the 4th Airmobile Division (including all attached units)
      - 1st Reconnaissance and Support-protection Helicopter Squadron (EHRAP1) with Gazelle/20mm helicopters
      - 2nd Reconnaissance and Support-protection Helicopter Squadron (EHRAP2) with Gazelle/20mm helicopters
      - 3rd Attack Helicopter Squadron (EHA3) with Gazelle/HOT helicopters
      - 4th Attack Helicopter Squadron (EHA4) with Gazelle/HOT helicopters from the 2^{e} Régiment d'Helicopteres de Combat
      - 5th Attack Helicopter Squadron (EHA5) with Gazelle/HOT helicopters
      - 6th Maneuver Helicopter Squadron (EHM6) with Puma helicopters
      - 1× airmobile infantry company from the 1^{er} Régiment d'Infanterie
    - 1× artillery battalion from the 18th Field Artillery Brigade with towed 155mm M198 howitzers
  - Groupement Est
    - 4^{e} Régiment de Dragons from the 10th Armoured Division
      - 3× squadrons with AMX-30 B2 main battle tanks
    - 3^{e} Régiment d'Infanterie de Marine from the 9th Marine Infantry Division
      - 3× companies with VAB APCs
      - 1× company from the 21^{e} Régiment d'Infanterie de Marine from the 6th Light Armoured Division with VAB APCs
      - 1× squadron from the Régiment d'Infanterie-Chars de Marine from the 9th Marine Infantry Division with AMX-10RC
    - 3^{e} Régiment d'Helicopteres de Combat from the 4th Airmobile Division (including all attached units)
      - 1st Reconnaissance and Support-protection Helicopter Squadron (EHRAP1) with Gazelle/20mm helicopters
      - 2nd Reconnaissance and Support-protection Helicopter Squadron (EHRAP2) with Gazelle/20mm helicopters from the 5^{e} Régiment d'Helicopteres de Combat
      - 3rd Attack Helicopter Squadron (EHA3) with Gazelle/HOT helicopters from the 6^{e} Régiment d'Helicopteres de Combat
      - 4th Attack Helicopter Squadron (EHA4) with Gazelle/HOT helicopters
      - 5th Maneuver Helicopter Squadron (EHM5) with Puma helicopters from the 6^{e} Régiment d'Helicopteres de Combat
      - 6th Attack Helicopter Squadron (EHA6) with Gazelle/HOT helicopters from the 5^{e} Régiment d'Helicopteres de Combat
      - 7th Maneuver Helicopter Squadron (EHM7) with Puma helicopters from the 5^{e} Régiment d'Helicopteres de Combat
      - 8th Maneuver Helicopter Squadron (EHM8) with Puma helicopters from the 4^{e} Régiment d'Helicopteres de Combat
      - 1× airmobile infantry company from the 1^{er} Régiment d'Infanterie
    - 2× artillery battalions from the 18th Field Artillery Brigade with towed 155mm M198 howitzers
  - 2nd Brigade, 82nd Airborne Division
    - 1st Battalion, 325th Infantry Regiment (Airborne)
    - 2nd Battalion, 325th Infantry Regiment (Airborne)
    - 4th Battalion, 325th Infantry Regiment (Airborne)
    - 2nd Battalion, 319th Field Artillery Regiment (Airborne) (105 mm howitzers)

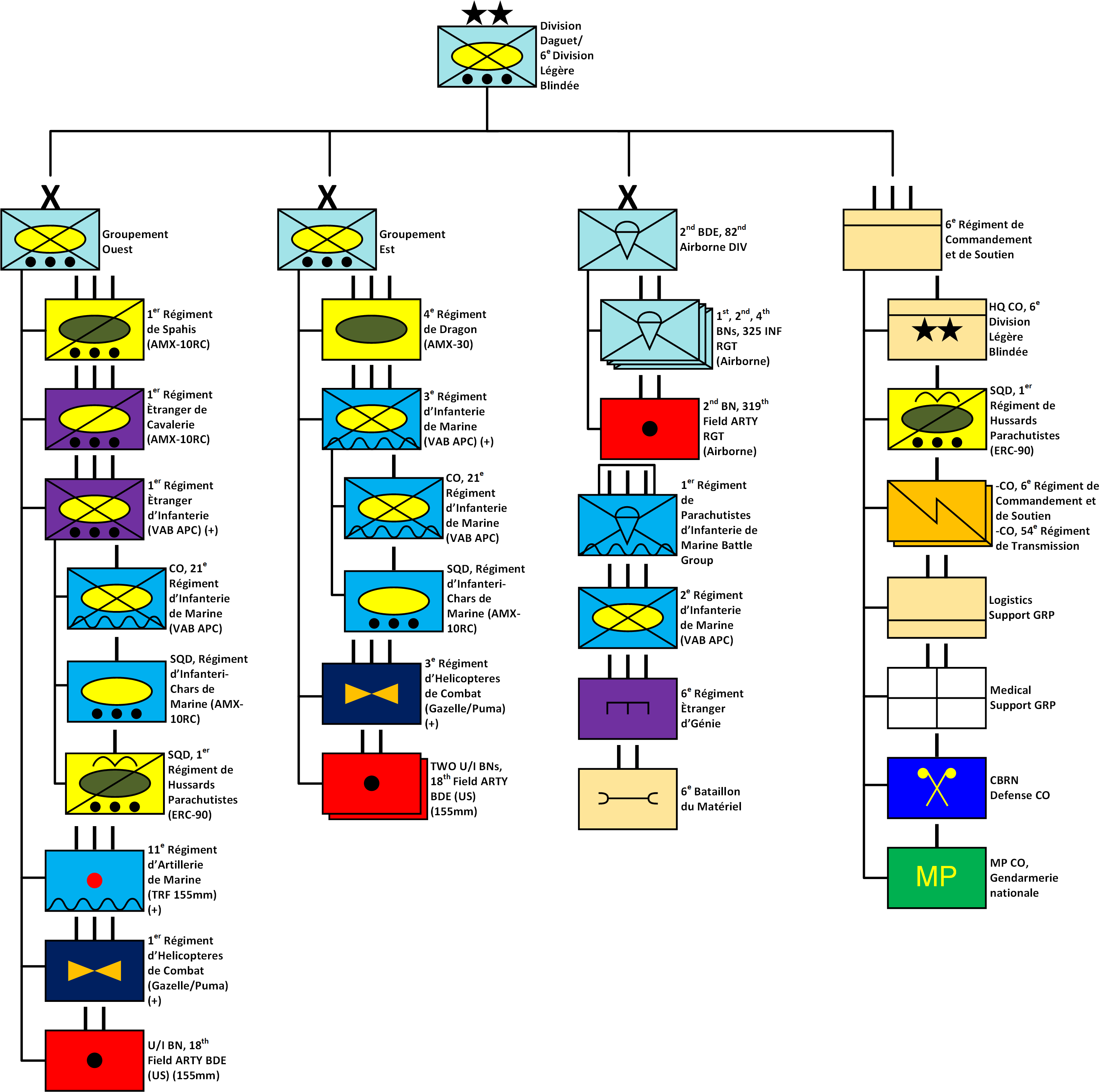
French Division Daguet during the First Gulf War

  - 1^{er} Régiment de Parachutistes d'Infanterie de Marine Battle Group with troops from the 11th Paratrooper Division
    - 1× headquarters company with men from the 7^{e} Régiment de Commandement et de Soutien and 14^{e} Régiment de Commandement et de Soutien
    - 1× airborne company with men from the 3^{e} Régiment Parachutiste d'Infanterie de Marine and 6^{e} Régiment Parachutiste d'Infanterie de Marine
    - 1× mixed reconnaissance/artillery company with men from the 1^{er} Régiment de Hussards Parachutistes and 35^{e} Régiment d'Artillerie Parachutiste
    - Reconnaissance and Covered Action Commando from the 2^{e} Régiment Étranger de Parachutistes
  - 2^{e} Régiment d'Infanterie de Marine from the 9th Marine Infantry Division
    - 3× companies with VAB APCs
  - 6^{e} Régiment Étranger de Génie from the 6th Light Armoured Division
    - 3× engineer companies
    - 1× detachment from the 3^{e} Régiment du Génie from the 10th Armoured Division
    - 1× detachment from the 5^{e} Régiment du Génie from the 1st Military Region
  - 6^{e} Bataillon du Matériel from the 6th Light Armoured Division
    - 3× maintenance companies
    - 1× maintenance company, organic to the 6^{e} Régiment de Commandement et de Soutien from the 6th Light Armoured Division
    - 1× maintenance company from the 9^{e} Régiment de Soutien Aéromobile
    - 1× maintenance company from the 9^{e} Bataillon du Matériel from the 9th Marine Infantry Division
    - 1× maintenance company from the 10^{e} Bataillon du Matériel from the 10th Armoured Division

== Casualties ==
Five members of Division Daguet were killed, including one before the beginning of the conflict and two afterwards: a soldier was killed in a car accident in Saudi Arabia in November 1990. During the conflict, two paratroopers of the 1^{er} Régiment de Parachutistes d'Infanterie de Marine were killed while clearing unexploded U.S. submunitions near Al-Salman on 26 February 1991, and after the conflict two Legionnaires of the 6^{e} Régiment Étranger de Génie were killed in March and April, respectively, near Kuwait City.
