= Maurizio Cocciolone =

Italian Air Force officer

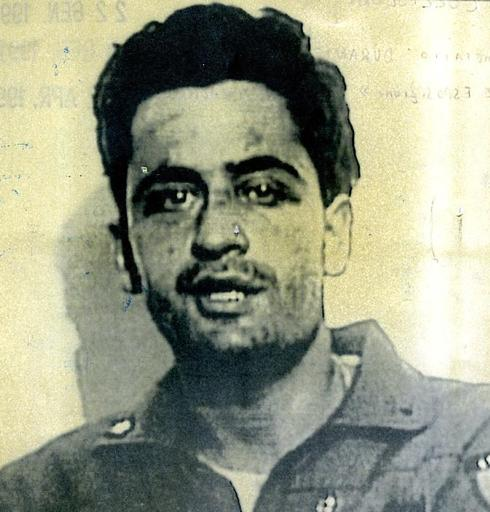
- Born: September 22, 1960 (age 66); L'Aquila, Abruzzo, Italy
- Military career
- Allegiance: Italy
- Branch: Italian Air Force
- Service years: 1979-2017
- Rank: Colonel
- Units: 155th Squadron; Task Force Aquila
- Commands: Deputy Commander of Task Force Aquila (13 October 2005 - 25 April 2006)
- Conflicts: Gulf War; Operazione Locusta (POW); Kosovo War War in Afghanistan

Maurizio Cocciolone is an Italian Air Force officer, who served with UN Coalition forces and was a prisoner of war during the Gulf War.

He was born on September 22, 1960 in L'Aquila, Abruzzo.

== Military Career ==
=== Gulf War ===
On the eve of the Operation Desert Storm the Italian government deployed eight Tornado fighter-bombers on the Gulf theatre of operations.

On January 16, 1991, coalition forces began concentrated air strikes on Iraqi military targets in Iraq and Kuwait.

On January 18, 1991, an Italian Panavia Tornado, piloted by Major Gianmarco Bellini, with Captain Maurizio Cocciolone as his navigator, took off as part of a multi national 48 planes squadron. Bellini and Cocciolone were the only members of the squadron able to execute in-flight refueling, while the other 47 aircraft failed and had to abort. The mission profile dictated that the operation could be performed even by a single plane, so Bellini and Cocciolone went on.

Their plane was hit by Iraqi anti aircraft fire and they had to eject. They were captured by Iraqi ground troops, even though their status was unknown at the time.

On January 20, 1991, Cocciolone was shown on Iraqi television as part of a propaganda effort by his Iraqi captors. First the voice interviews, followed by the videotapes, were released by CNN. Cocciolone appeared to be speaking under extreme duress, and his face showed signs of physical abuse. No news of Bellini was given initially, and he was feared to be a casualty. The two were kept separate for the whole time of their captivity.

Released by Iraq on March 3, 1991, Bellini and Cocciolone were the only Italian POWs captured during the entire war.

=== Kosovo War ===
During the Kosovo War, Cocciolone operated AWACS aircraft.

=== War in Afghanistan ===
During the War in Afghanistan, Cocciolone appointed as the Deputy Commander of Task Force Aquila on October 13, 2005 and was stationed in Herat, Afghanistan.
