= Opération Daguet =

French operations during the 1991 Gulf War

- Part of the Gulf War
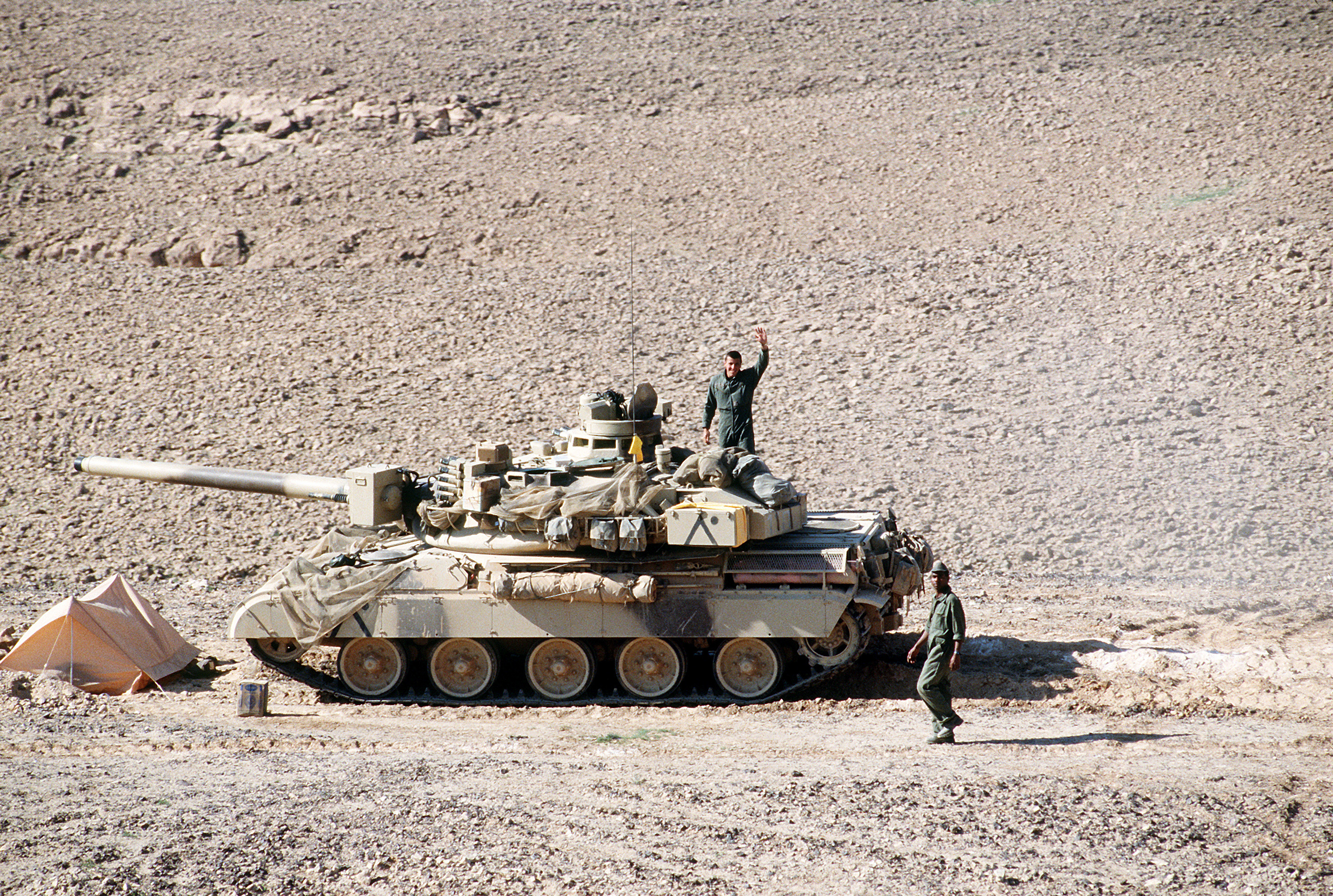
- An AMX-30 of the 4th Dragoon Regiment bivouacked near Al-Salman during Opération Daguet.
Date	1990–1991
Location	Kuwait, Iraq, Persian Gulf
Result	Operation success; Coalition victory

Belligerents
France; United States	Iraq

Commanders and leaders
(France) Michel Roquejeoffre	Unknown

Strength
(France) French Armed Forces: Division Daguet; 12,500 men; 44 AMX-30 tanks; 96 AMX-10RC armored reconnaissance and fire support vehicles; 13 ERC 90 Sagaie recon and fire support vehicles; 214 VAB APCs; 18 TRF1 howitzers; 132 helicopters; French Air Force; French Navy; United States Armed Forces (4,500 men): 3 battalions from the 325th Infantry Regiment; 1 battalion from the 319th Field Artillery Regiment; 27th Engineer Battalion	(Iraq) Iraqi Armed Forces: 45th Mechanized Infantry Division; c. 11,000 men; At least 50 tanks (T-54, T-62, Type 69 and T-72); Various armored vehicles; Hundreds of military trucks; More than 50 howitzers (122 mm caliber); Air defence weapons

Casualties and losses
France: 10 French fatalities (2 of which were suffered in combat and 2 others as a result of the explosion of two scattered American BLU-97 cluster munitions near the Al-Salman airfield on February 26); 33 French troops injured during the operation (23 of those casualties were caused by the aforementioned explosion); United States: 8 US Army engineers died and several others were injured at Al-Salman airfield as a result of an explosion caused by a container full of collected BLU-97 duds that the engineer battalion was moving while clearing the airfield so allied aircraft could use it (the area was found blanketed by unexploded air-launched US ordnance when the Division Daguet seized it; this incident occurred hours prior to the second detonation that caused the French casualties); The number of combat-related injuries is unknown but most likely marginal based on the casualties of the main French force; Material losses: 1 Dassault Mirage F1 lost in an accident; 4 SEPECAT Jaguar slightly damaged by Iraqi air defence systems	The number of dead or wounded is unknown (possibly not publicly reported); 2,956 POWs; 6,000–7,000 men on the run; Material losses: 20 T-54, T-62 and Type 69 tanks destroyed; 2 T-72 captured; 17 armoured vehicles destroyed; 114 trucks destroyed and 7 captured; 26 artillery pieces and anti-aircraft guns destroyed and 40 captured; 70 82 mm and 120 mm mortars captured; 700 tons of ammunition captured and destroyed at the Al-Salman Air Base; Al-Salman Air Base rendered non-operational following extensive destruction

Opération Daguet (French pronunciation: [ɔpeʁasjɔ̃ daɡɛ], Operation Brocket) was the codename for French operations during the 1991 Gulf War. 18,000 members of the French Armed Forces were deployed during the conflict, representing the second largest European contingent. Operating on the left flank of the US XVIII Airborne Corps, the ground component of the French force, named Division Daguet, was formed in September 1990 in Saudi Arabia as part of France's contribution to the coalition. France also deployed several combat aircraft and naval units. Opération Daguet was commanded by Army general Michel Roquejeoffre.

The task given to the Division Daguet, which was composed of units drawn from more than 25 regiments, was the capture of the Al Salman Air Base some 150 km inside Iraqi territory, passing through two intermediate objectives designated "Rochambeau" and "Chambord". 3 American battalions from the 325th Infantry Regiment, 1 from the 319th Field Artillery Regiment as well as the 27th Engineer Battalion were placed under French operational control, reinforcing by 4,500 men the 12,500-strong French ground force. The offensive was launched on 24 February 1991 at 7 a.m. and the mission accomplished in no more than 48 hours by crushing the Iraqi 45th Mechanized infantry Division, which the French troops encountered on the way. The Al-Salman airfield was taken on the afternoon of February 25 and the village on the morning of February 26 without resistance.

== Background ==
The conflict was between Iraq and a coalition force of approximately 30 nations led by the United States and mandated by the United Nations Security Council in order to liberate Kuwait. The lead up to the war began with the Iraqi invasion of Kuwait on 2 August 1990, following unproven Iraqi contentions that Kuwait was illegally "slant-drilling" oil across Iraq's border. The invasion was met with immediate economic sanctions by the United Nations against Iraq. After a period of diplomacy and coalition forces deploying to Saudi Arabia and other Gulf States, hostilities commenced with air operations on 17 January 1991, resulting in a decisive victory for the coalition forces, which drove Iraqi forces out of Kuwait with minimal coalition deaths. The main battles were aerial and ground combat within Iraq, Kuwait, and bordering areas of Saudi Arabia. The war did not expand outside the immediate Iraqi–Kuwaiti–Saudi border region, although Iraq fired missiles on Israeli cities.

== Deployment ==
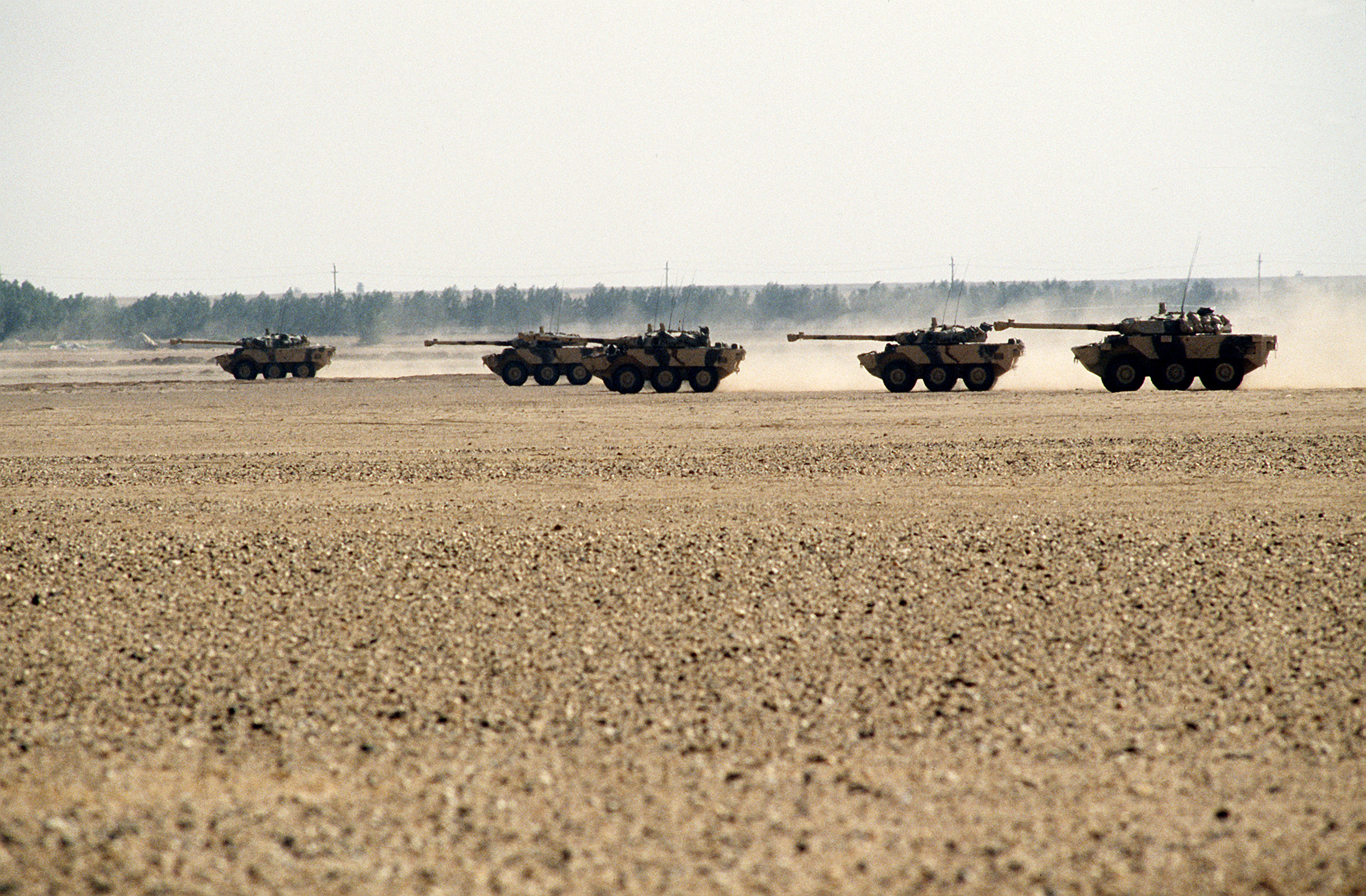
French AMX-10 RCs during Operation Desert Shield

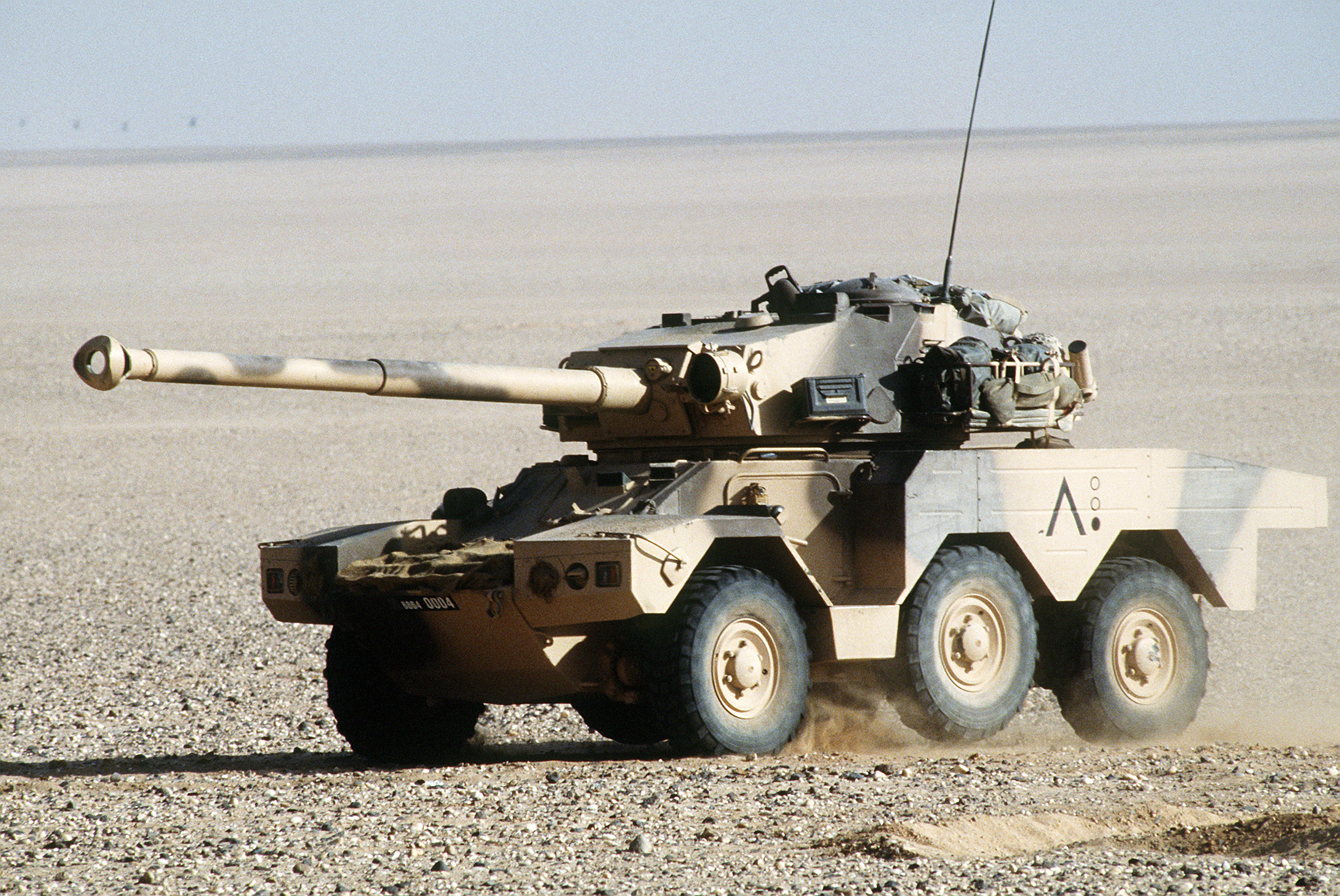
Panhard ERC-90 Sagaie of the 1er régiment de hussards parachutistes in Saudi Arabia during Operation Daguet

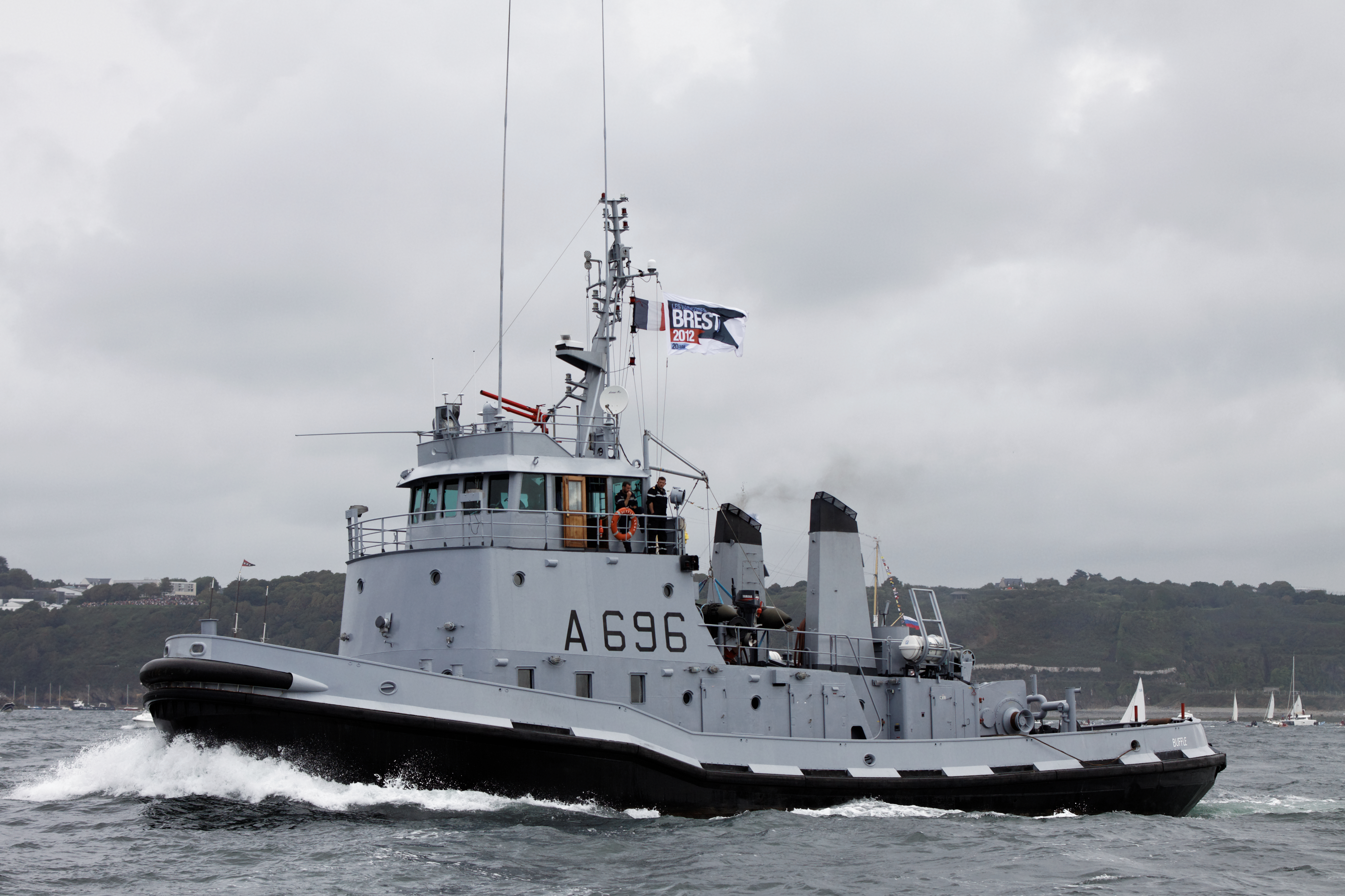
The tugboat Buffle sent from Toulon to support port operations during Operation Salamandre

Soon after the invasion of Kuwait, France sent an additional frigate to augment the two French warships already in the Persian Gulf. Operation Salamandre launched with the deployment of the 5th Regiment of Combat Helicopters (RHC) and a company of the first Regiment of Infantry on board the French aircraft carrier Clemenceau, escorted by the cruiser Colbert, the tanker Var and the tugboat Buffle.

On 14 September 1990, Iraqi forces entered the residence of the French ambassador in Kuwait. In response, French President François Mitterrand increased the number of troops and aircraft deploying to Saudi Arabia. Soon after, the French intervention was renamed Opération Daguet under the command of General Michel Roquejeoffre. Additional French reinforcements arrived in December 1990 and January 1991.

The French ground forces contribution was the provisional Division Daguet, which was drawn from various corps of the army. Division Daguet split its forces into two tactical groups for the actual ground war: Group West (Groupement ouest) and Group East (Groupement est). Initially, the French operated independently under national command and control, but coordinated closely with the Americans, Saudis and CENTCOM. In January, the Division was placed under the tactical control of the US XVIII Airborne Corps and reinforced for the ground war with the following units from the US Army: 3 battalions from the 325th Infantry Regiment, one battalion from the 319th Field Artillery Regiment (all part of the 2nd Brigade of the 82nd Airborne Division) and the 27th Engineer Battalion.

The role of the Division Daguet and the US XVIII Airborne Corps was to protect the theatre left flank and perhaps draw off Iraqi tactical and operational reserves.

The amphibious assault ship Foudre was sent to Kuwait to increase the force's medical capabilities.

== Naval operations ==
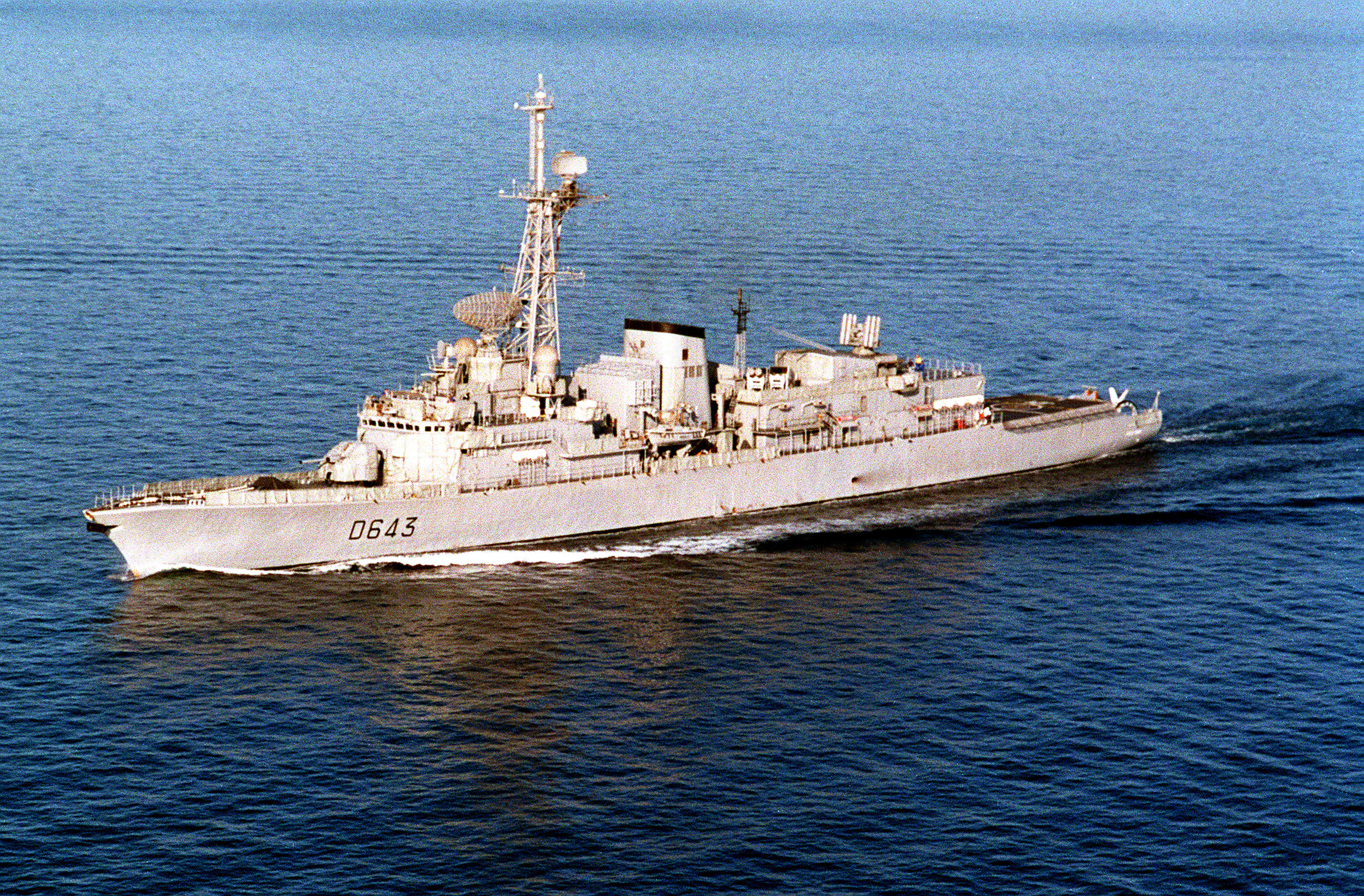
The frigate Jean de Vienne on patrol as part of the Maritime Interdiction Force

The naval part of the operation was called Opération Artimon. From August, it was carried out by three A 69 type avisos, organised around the frigates Dupleix and Montcalm, supported by the tanker Durance. In October, the deployment was reinforced with the frigate La Motte-Picquet and fleet escort Du Chayla.

In December, Jean de Vienne and Premier-Maître L'Her replaced La Motte-Picquet. In March Jean de Vienne was relieved by Latouche-Tréville.

The ships enforced the embargo against Iraq by controlling merchant shipping, including 28 586 controls and the boarding of over 1000 ships for further inspection. 14 warning shots were fired. Notably, on 20 September, the Iraqi ship Al Taawin Al Aradien was intercepted by the US cruiser USS San Jacinto, the Spanish frigate Infanta Cristina and the fleet escort Du Chayla; she refused to comply until warning shots were fired, but refused to be boarded by anyone but the French. A group of Fusiliers Marins hence inspected the ship.

== Operations – air and naval phase ==
Prior to the start of air strikes in January 1991, coalition naval forces were operating in the Persian Gulf to enforce sanctions against Iraq. Along with other nations, French warships conducted boarding operations against ships suspected of breaking the sanctions against Iraq. On one such occasion, on 2 October 1990, the French aviso Doudart de Lagree intercepted the North Korean vessel, Sam Il Po, which was carrying plywood panels. After the merchant vessel repeatedly failed to answer bridge-to-bridge radio calls, warning shots were fired across the vessel's bow. Sam Il Po then stopped and permitted the French ship to board.

A long series of UN Security Council resolutions were passed regarding the conflict. One of the most important was Resolution 678, passed on 29 November giving Iraq a withdrawal deadline of 15 January 1991, and authorizing "all necessary means to uphold and implement Resolution 660", a diplomatic formulation authorising the use of force. After the deadline passed, on 17 January 1991, intensive air operations began. The majority of missions were flown by the United States, but French Air Force aircraft also took part. SEPECAT Jaguars undertook ground attack missions, Mirage F1s undertook ground attack and reconnaissance missions and Mirage 2000s provided fighter air cover. Mirage F1s were later grounded over concerns that they would be misidentified as enemy fighters by coalition forces since the Iraqi Air Force also operated the Mirage F1.

Compared to losses faced by U.S. and U.K, the French suffered no combat loss of aircraft in any engagement of the war. The French had deployed 40 planes. Four Jaguars were damaged by anti-aircraft fire.

== Operations – ground phase ==
The French operated on the left flank during Opération Daguet

On 24 February 1991, the ground phase began. Reconnaissance units of the 6th French Light Armoured Division advanced into Iraq. Three hours later, the French main body attacked. The initial objective for the French was an airfield 90 miles (140 km) inside Iraq at As-Salman. Reinforced by the 325th Airborne Infantry Regiment from the US 82nd Airborne Division, the French crossed the border unopposed and attacked north. The French then came across elements of the 45th Iraqi Mechanised Infantry Division. After a brief battle, supported by French Army missile-armed Aérospatiale Gazelle armed helicopters, they controlled the objective and captured 2,500 prisoners. By the end of the first day, the French force had secured its objectives and continued the attack north, securing the highways from Baghdad to southern Iraq.

== Casualties ==
Nine French soldiers were killed during the operation, including two before the beginning of the conflict and five afterwards: a soldier was killed in a car accident in Saudi Arabia in November 1990, and a pilot one month later in the crash landing of his Mirage F1, at the time of a reconnaissance mission in Saudi Arabia. During the conflict, two paratroopers of the 1st Marine Infantry Parachute Regiment, 1e RPMIa; Sergeant Schmitt and Corporal-Chef Éric Cordier were killed while clearing unexploded U.S. submunitions near Al-Salman on 26 February 1991. 33 others were wounded, including 22 slightly. After the conflict, eight soldiers of the 1st IR were wounded (including three seriously) on 12 March 1991, while going along the Texas road, close to Have-Salman. Two Legionnaires of the 6th Foreign Engineer Regiment were killed in March and April near Kuwait City, and three died in May, including two in car accidents.

== Battle honours ==
A Kuwait 1990–91 battle honour was issued to several regiments by a decision after the war.

== See also ==
- List of military equipment used by the French Armed Forces, during Opération Daguet
- Gulf War
