= Coalition of the Gulf War =

- 1990–1991
- Coalition Iraqi Republic
- Status: Disbanded
- Headquarters: Riyadh, Saudi Arabia
- Type: Military alliance
- Membership: Primary contributors: United States; United Kingdom; France; Saudi Arabia; Egypt; Kuwait (in exile); Other contributors: Afghanistan; Argentina; Australia; Bahrain; Bangladesh; Belgium; Canada; Czechoslovakia; Denmark; Germany; Greece; Honduras; Hungary; Italy; Japan; Luxembourg; Morocco; Netherlands; New Zealand; Niger; Norway; Oman; Pakistan; Philippines; Poland; Portugal; Qatar; Romania; Senegal; Sierra Leone; Singapore; South Korea; Spain; Sweden; Syria; Turkey; United Arab Emirates

Leaders
  - Secretary-General of the United Nations: Javier Pérez de Cuéllar
  - Commander of the United States Central Command: Norman Schwarzkopf
- Historical era: Arab Cold War
  - Iraqi invasion of Kuwait: 2–4 August 1990
  - Adoption of UNSC Resolution 678: 29 November 1990
  - Adoption of U.S. Congress Resolution Against Iraq: 14 January 1991
  - Beginning of Gulf War air campaign: 17 January 1991
  - Beginning of Liberation of Kuwait campaign: 24 February 1991
  - Adoption of UNSC Resolution 686: 2 March 1991

On 29 November 1990, the adoption of United Nations Security Council Resolution 678 authorized the assembly of a multinational military coalition to liberate Iraqi-occupied Kuwait by "all necessary means" if Iraq did not withdraw its forces by 15 January 1991. Iraq failed to do so, and the coalition began an aerial bombardment against targets in Iraq and Kuwait on 17 January 1991. At this time, the coalition consisted of 42 countries and was spearheaded by the United States. The central command was led by the United States, Saudi Arabia, and the United Kingdom; the marine command was led by the United States; the Joint Forces East Command was led by Egypt, Saudi Arabia, Syria, Morocco, Kuwait, Oman, the United Arab Emirates, Qatar, Bahrain, Poland, and Czechoslovakia; and the Joint Forces North Command was led by the United States, the United Kingdom, France, Canada, Italy, Australia, and Turkey.

On 23 February 1991, the aerial bombardment campaign came to an end and the coalition began a ground offensive into Iraqi-occupied Kuwait and parts of Iraq. The Iraqi military was devastated in the fighting, and Kuwait was declared completely free of the occupation on 28 February 1991.

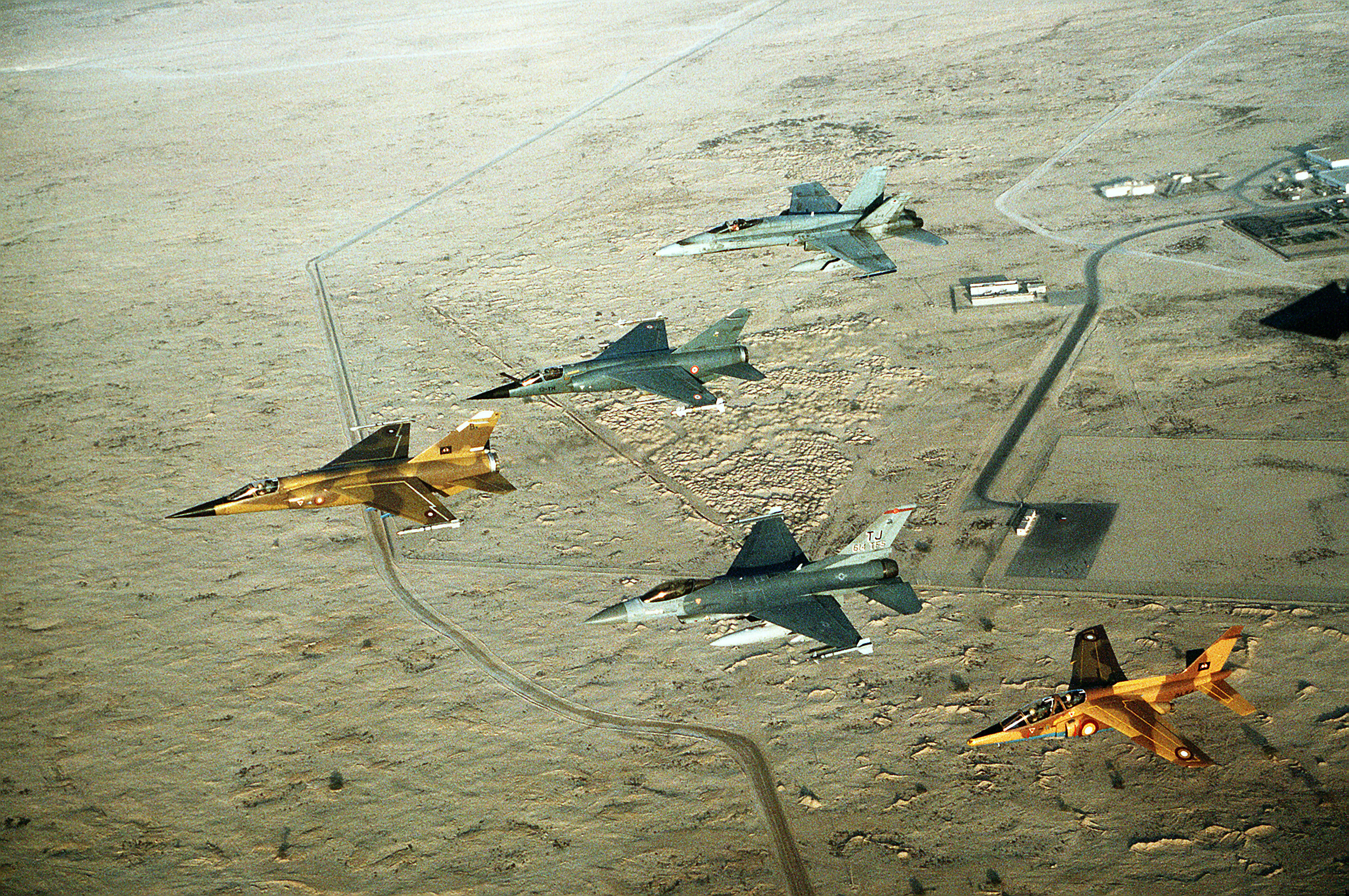
Multinational group (Qatari F1 Mirage & Alpha Jet, French F1 Mirage, U.S. F-16, and Canadian CF-18 Air Forces) of fighter jets during Operation Desert Shield

== Member states ==
The coalition is often described as having 34 members, but the number of participating countries changed considerably. Some countries contributed large combat forces to the campaign, others sent naval forces, air units, logistics, medical personnel, engineering detachments, financial assistance or granted access to military bases and airspace. There was also a difference in participation during the defensive phase and the offensive phase.

=== Argentina ===
Argentina contributed 500 troops, two corvettes, a destroyer, two cargo planes and three helicopters. The operations of Argentinian forces were codenamed Operation Alfil.

=== Australia ===
Australia contributed at least one HMAS Adelaide, HMAS Darwin, HMAS Sydney, and HMAS Brisbane missile frigates, one destroyer and one supply ship. Limited numbers of Australian troops were imbedded in British and American formations, and RAAF photo interpreters were based in Saudi Arabia. Soldiers of the Royal Australian Artillery provided air defence to the Australian supply ships, as they had none of their own.

=== Bahrain ===
Bahraini troops played a limited role in the conflict, with the Bahraini Army providing troops to the Gulf Cooperation Council contingent (exclusively embedded with Saudi Arabian and Kuwaiti troops), which played a support role in the conflict. The Bahraini government also allowed their territory to be used as a logistical hub for coalition forces..

=== Bangladesh ===
The Bangladeshi contribution to the coalition contained about 2300 personnel.[1] Contribution of the Bangladesh Army in the 1991 Gulf War During the 1991 Gulf War (Operation Desert Shield and Operation Desert Storm), Bangladesh was among the first Asian and Muslim-majority nations to answer the call of the United Nations, joining the United States multinational coalition to liberate Kuwait following its invasion and occupation by Iraqi forces. Overview and Operational Deployment Codename: The Bangladeshi military deployment to the Arabian Peninsula was designated Operation Moruprantar (Operation Desert). Troop Strength: Bangladesh committed a task force of approximately 2,300 military personnel stationed in Saudi Arabia and the broader Gulf theatre. Key Units and Composition: The contingent was a multi-disciplinary force comprising infantry, engineering, medical, and logistics capabilities: East Bengal Regiment: Provided ground security, perimeter defense, and static guarding for critical coalition staging bases, airfields, and key supply lines in Saudi Arabia. Engineers: Provided essential combat engineering support, field infrastructure construction, and minefield clearance support. Medical Corps: Deployed field ambulance units to deliver medical aid to coalition personnel and offer emergency healthcare and humanitarian relief to displaced civilians. Supply and Logistics: Service and maintenance elements oversaw supply lines, equipment upkeep, and transportation logistics throughout the campaign. Post-War Operations and Mine Clearance Following the cessation of hostilities and the liberation of Kuwait in February 1991, the Bangladesh Army engineering contingent transitioned into explosive ordnance disposal (EOD), mine-clearing, and infrastructure restoration. Operating in heavily mined sectors of Kuwait, Bangladeshi personnel cleared thousands of landmines, booby traps, and unexploded ordnance (UXO). Over 270 Bangladeshi personnel lost their lives during post-war demining and reconstruction operations in Kuwait. Command Structure Contingent Commander: The Bangladeshi Military Contingent in Saudi Arabia was commanded by Lieutenant General Hasan Mashhud Chowdhury (then serving as a senior field commander during the operational phase). He subsequently served as the 11th Chief of Army Staff of the Bangladesh Army from 2002 to 2005.

=== Belgium ===
Belgium had a limited deployment of troops and aircraft to Turkey, and several ships deployed to the gulf.

Two minesweepers of the Tripartite class, the Iris and the Myostis along with the Command and Logistics ship Zinnia, deployed to the gulf, and conducted mine clearing operations. The Belgian government later decided to send an additional minesweeper, the Dianthus. When the ceasefire took place, clearing operations moved to the coast off Kuwait.

Eighteen Mirage 5s of 8th Fighter Squadron and six C-130s of the 15th Air Transport Wing were deployed to Turkey as part of the NATO preventative deployment of aircraft.

Medical personnel were attached to a British Field Hospital in Cyprus, and were also deployed in Turkey alongside 75 soldiers.

=== Canada ===
Canada's contribution included 4,600 personnel, and their activities were codenamed Operation Friction. Royal Canadian Navy vessels took part in the war, the Royal Canadian Air Force conducted patrols and bombing missions, and the army deployed a field hospital. Canadian aircraft and ground forces also attacked retreating Iraqi military forces along the Highway of Death.

=== Czechoslovakia ===
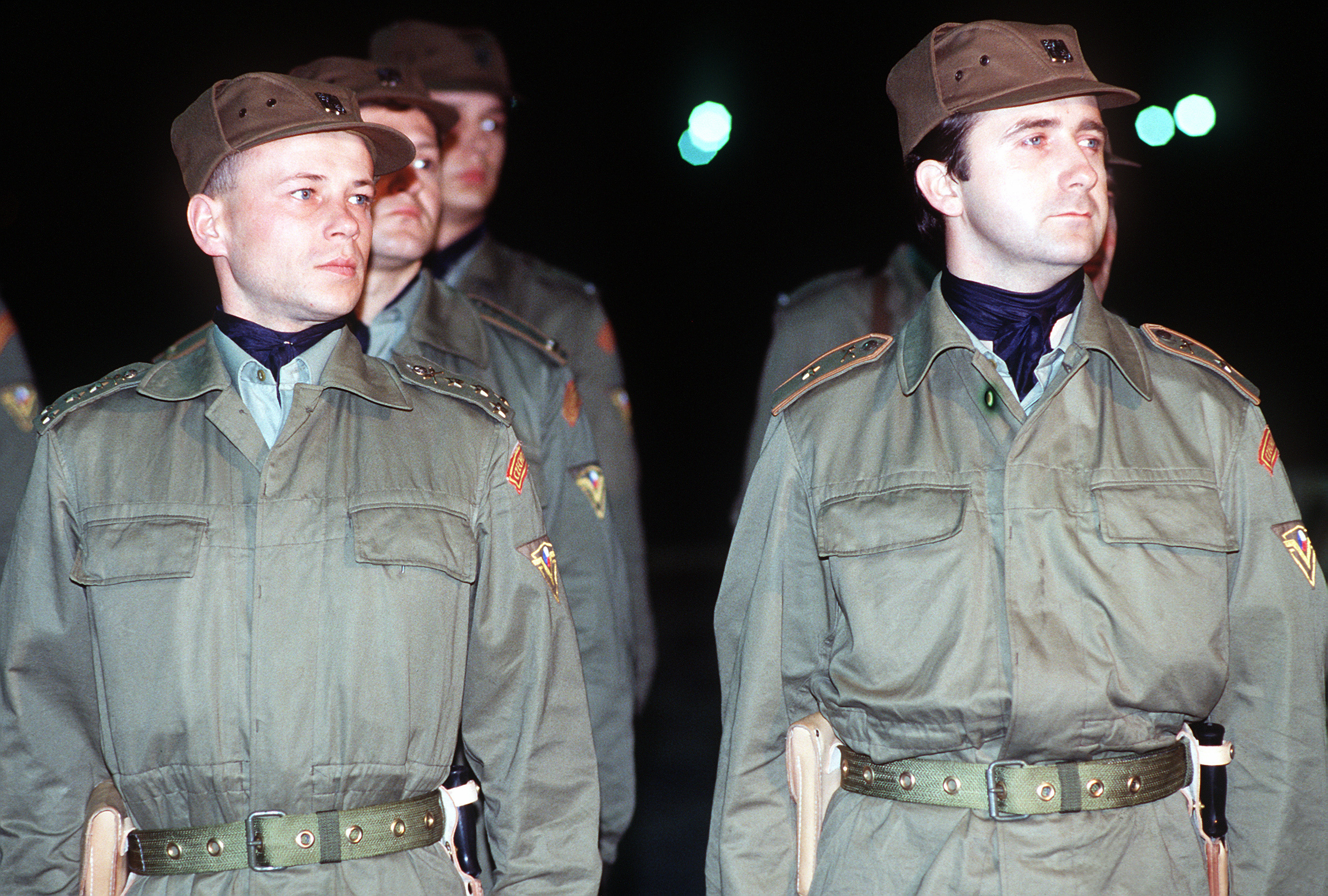
Czechoslovak soldiers during Operation Desert Shield.

The Czechoslovak contribution included a specialised 200-man chemical defence unit and 150 medical personnel. The lead Czechoslovak commander was Ján Való. The war was notable as the first time Czechoslovak troops had taken part in an armed conflict since the Second World War, and would be the last time before the breakup of Czechoslovakia in 1993.

=== Denmark ===
Denmark deployed the HDMS Olfert Fischer (a Niels Juel-class Corvette) alongside 100 personnel.

=== Egypt ===
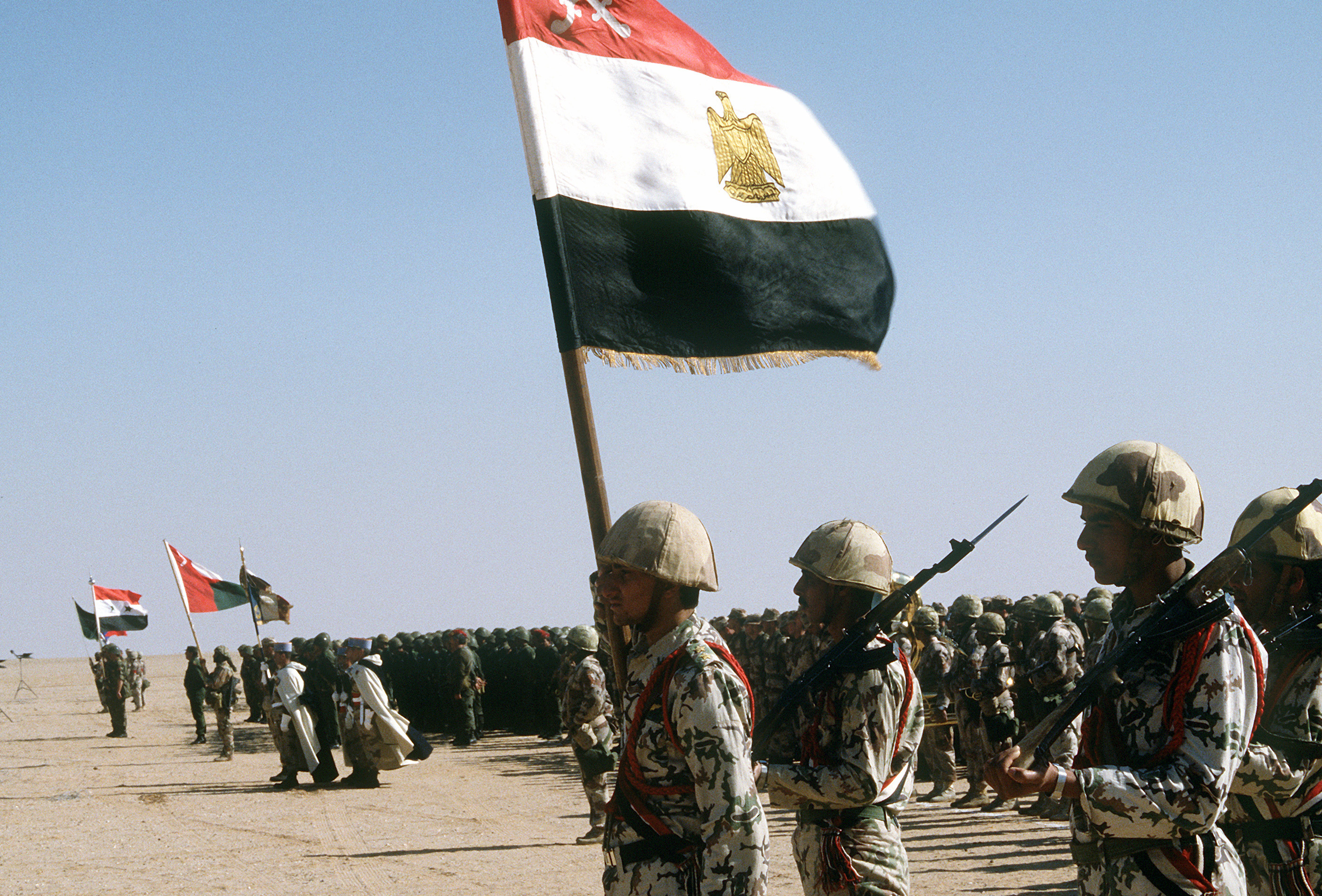
Coalition troops from Egypt, France, Oman, Syria, and Kuwait stand for review during Operation Desert Storm.

Egypt contributed around 40,000 soldiers and 400 tanks. Their commander was Salah Mohammed Atia Halabi.

=== France ===
The French contingent consisted of around 20,000 personnel led by Lieutenant General Michel Roquejeoffre, and their activities were codenamed Opération Daguet. France also contributed 14 ships, more than 75 aircraft, and 350 tanks.

=== Germany ===
Germany sent one fighter squadron to Turkey to show solidarity with operations in Kuwait and make its presence felt on NATO's southern flank. Restrictions on the use of NATO airbases in Germany were removed so they could be used for logistics. Germany also provided $6 billion in cash and material to aid the coalition.

=== Greece ===
Greek forces included Hellenic Air Force pilots and ground support staff and the frigate Limnos in the Red Sea. The Greek Merchant Marine Service aided the Coalition in the movement of fuel and equipment with their large fleet, and most Greek airfields were made available for US and allied use.

=== Honduras ===
Honduras sent 400 personnel to the join the coalition.

=== Hungary ===
Hungary contributed approximately 40 personnel, including a medical team.

=== Italy ===
The Italian contribution included about 1,950 personnel; their operation mostly involved aircraft, and the air operation was known as Operazione Locusta. Italy deployed eight Panavia Tornado aircraft, which conducted sorties over the 42 days of war, and a cell of RF-104G Starfighter tactical reconnaissance aircraft, which operated from Turkey to monitor the coalition's flank. Six F-104s were stationed in Turkey. 4 ships were sent to the gulf. The Italian commander of the operation was Mario Arpino.

=== Japan ===
Japan contributed no personnel or equipment to the coalition force as it was prohibited from doing so by its constitution. However, the Japanese government made a financial contribution of approximately $13 billion to fund Coalition operations.

=== Kuwait ===
The contribution of Kuwaiti forces in exile included around 16,000 to 20,000 personnel at the time of the Iraqi invasion on August 2, 1990, with 2,200 in the air force and 1,800 in the navy. Kuwait helped finance a significant share of coalition operations costs including logistic support for deployed forces.

=== Luxembourg ===
Luxembourg provided financial support. After the war, Luxembourgish soldiers were deployed to deliver humanitarian aid to Kurdish civilians taking refuge in the mountains along the Turkish-Iraqi border.

=== Morocco ===
Morocco contributed around 1,700 to 2,000 personnel.(while some reports or tables of coalition forces mention a higher number like 13,000 (often confusing it with Moroccan personnel transferred in previous decades), the primary force sent specifically for the 1991 Gulf War coalition was 1,700–2,000 troops.)

=== New Zealand ===
New Zealand provided two Lockheed C-130 Hercules transporter aircraft and 100 personnel.

=== The Netherlands ===
The Royal Netherlands Navy sent two frigates to help maintain the UN embargo on Iraq, and three minehunters to clear mines off the coast of Kuwait. The Royal Netherlands Army provided a field hospital and medical team for the coalition, while the Royal Netherlands Air Force sent two MIM-23 Hawk squadrons and three MIM-104 Patriot squadrons – one of which was deployed in Israel to defend against Iraqi Scud missiles.

=== Niger ===
Niger deployed about 480 troops to guard shrines in Mecca and Medina.

=== Norway ===
Norway contributed 280 personnel, one naval vessel, a field hospital, and intelligence capabilities.

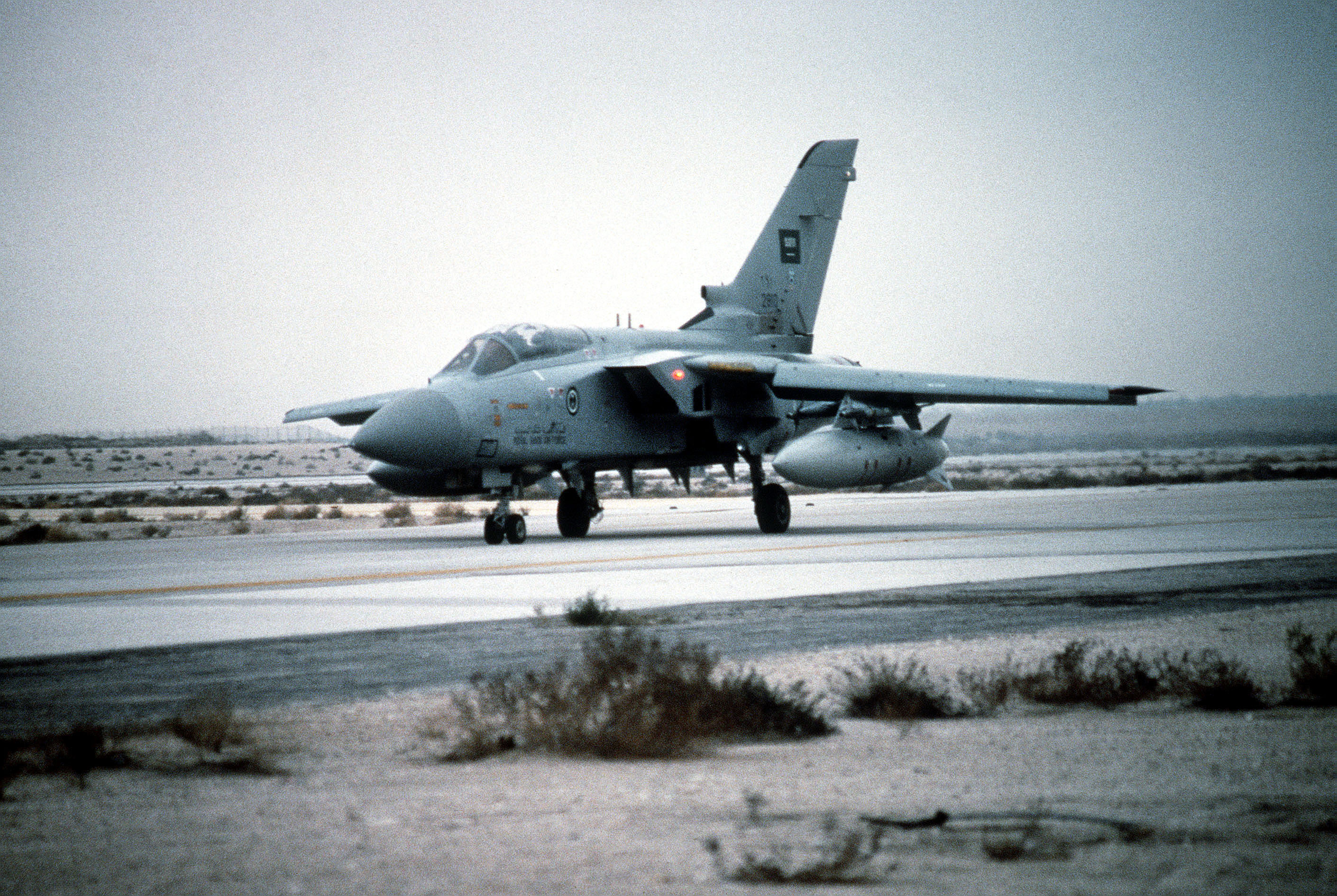
A Royal Saudi Air Force Tornado F3 during Operation Desert Storm

=== Oman ===
Oman contributed about 6,300 personnel.

=== Pakistan ===
The Pakistani contingent was 4,900–5,500 strong. Mirza Aslam Beg, then-Pakistani Chief of the Army Staff, endorsed the campaign against Iraq. In a briefing given to president Ghulam Ishaq Khan, Beg maintained the assessment that once the ground battle with the Iraqi Army began, the Iraqi Army would comprehensively repel and defeat the US Army. Beg accused Western countries of encouraging Iraq to invade Kuwait, but supported the armed forces fighting Iraq in support of Saudi Arabia. In 1990, he held state dinner for United States Central Command commander General Norman Schwarzkopf where, alongside Chairman of the Joint Chiefs Admiral Iftikhar Sirohey, he briefed US commanders on Pakistani preparations and military operational capabilities. The war was a polarizing political issue in Pakistan.

Beg predicted that popular opinion of US would favor Iraq, as anti-American sentiment in the Middle East was growing.

=== Philippines ===
The Philippines sent around 200 medical personnel.

=== Poland ===
The Polish contribution included approximately 320 personnel and 2 warships – ORP Wodnik and ORP Piast. Poland also conducted intelligence operations, such as Operation Simoom.

=== Portugal ===
Portugal provided one logistics ship and two C-130 transport aircraft.

=== Qatar ===
Qatar contributed around 2,600 personnel. Qatari forces participated in the Battle of Khafji.

=== Romania ===
Romania deployed 363 medical personnel and 21 soldiers. As part of Britain's Operation Granby, a field hospital was deployed to al-Jubayl.

=== Saudi Arabia ===
An estimated 60,000 to 100,000 Saudi troops participated in operations against Iraq, led by Khalid bin Sultan, Saleh Al-Muhaya, and Sultan Al-Mutairi. In addition, the country was of the major financial contributors to the costs of the operation, as well as providing logistics support to deployed forces.

=== Senegal ===
Senegal contributed approximately 500 troops. 92 Senegalese soldiers were killed in a plane crash, along with six Saudi Arabian crewmen, in the deadliest single aviation accident among coalition forces.

=== Singapore ===
Singapore sent 30 personnel to provide medical and humanitarian services under Operation Nightingale, as well as nine military support teams.

=== South Korea ===
The South Korean contingent consisted of 777 men, primarily focused on medical and logistical support. They were present in theater from 24 January to 10 April 1991.

=== Spain ===
Spain deployed 500 ground troops (mostly engineers) with another 3,000 participating in naval operations: two corvettes and one destroyer patrolled near the strait of Bab al Mandeb.

=== Syria ===
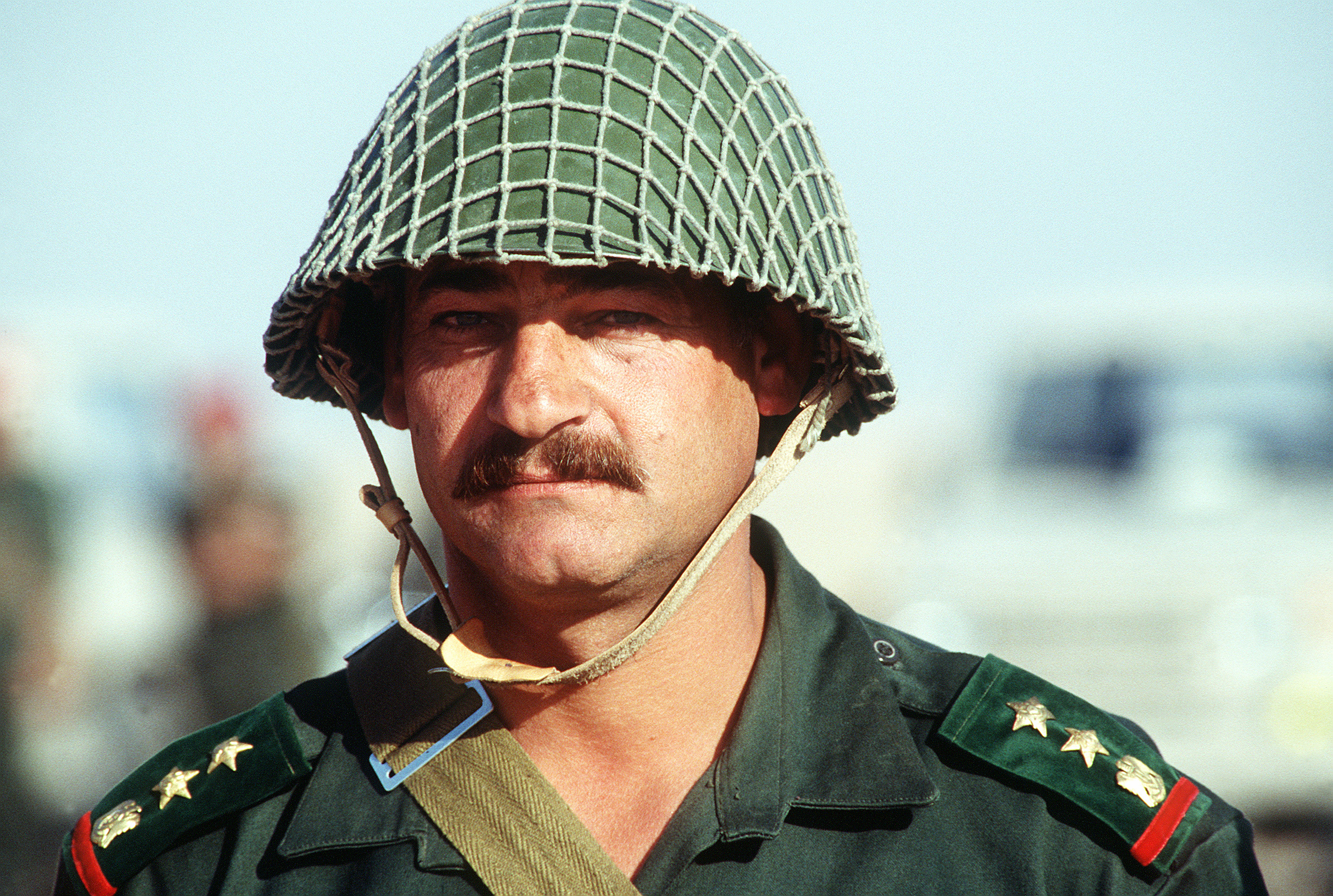
A Syrian Arab Army colonel during Operation Desert Shield.

Syria's contributed around 14,500-20,000 troops, led by Mustafa Tlass.

=== Sweden ===
The Swedish contingent numbered about 525 and included a field hospital.

=== Turkey ===
Turkey contributed to the air campaign against Iraq.

=== United Arab Emirates ===
The UAE contributed one army battalion and a squadron of Mirage fighters. They also provided facilities to deploy over 255 aircraft, and gave the coalition access to practically all of their ports and shipyards.

=== United Kingdom ===
The UK participated in Operation Granby and the Battle of Norfolk. The total British contribution included 16 ships, 58 aircraft, and 53,462 personnel, including 1st Armoured Division, 7th Armoured Brigade, 4th Armoured Brigade. British commanders included: Patrick Hine, commander of all British forces; Michael Graydon, Air Officer Commanding-in-Chief RAF Strike Command; Peter de la Billière – Commander-in-Chief of British Forces and John Chapple, Chief of the General Staff.

=== United States ===
The United States was the largest contributor to the coalition, with some 697,000 personnel. Its forces participated in Operation Desert Shield, the Battle of Khafji, the Battle of 73 Easting, the Battle of Al Busayyah, the Battle of Phase Line Bullet, the Battle of Medina Ridge, Battle of Wadi al-Batin, and the Battle of Norfolk, among other engagements. American commanders included Colin Powell, Calvin Waller, Charles Horner, Walt Boomer, Stan Arthur, Frederick Franks, Buster Glosson. Norman Schwarzkopf led all coalition forces in the battle against Iraq.

== Afghan and Kurdish militias ==
According to sources, 300 members of the anti-communist militias, Afghan mujahideen, joined the coalition towards the end of the war on 11 February 1991. Iraqi Kurdish rebel groups also reportedly rebelled against Saddam.

== See also ==
- Carter Doctrine
- Coalition of the willing (Iraq War)
- Coalition of the willing (Russo-Ukrainian War)
