= Paul Lardry =

Paul Lardry
- Born: 2 September 1928 (age 98)
- Died: January 24, 2012
- Military career
- Allegiance: France
- Branch: French Army
- Service years: 1951–1991
- Rank: Général d'armée
- Commands: 13th Demi-Brigade of Foreign Legion; 13^{e} DBLE (1974) Foreign Legion Groupment (1980); 31st Brigade (1980–1982); Indian Ocean French Area Forces (1983); Force d'Action Rapide; FAR (1986)
- Conflicts: Indochina War; Algerian War

Paul Lardry (1928–2012) was a général d'armée of the French Army who served almost an entire career and Commandant of the Foreign Legion.

== Military career ==
After completing a course at a private military institution, he entered Saint-Cyr promotion « général Aubert Frère » (1948–1950) (French: général Frère). He accordingly commenced his career at the 27th Alpine Chasseur Battalion (French: 27^{e} bataillon de chasseurs alpins). In 1951, he joined the Foreign Legion. He was assigned to the 13^{e} DBLE engaged in Indochina, a tour during which he was wounded. He received accordingly the Croix de guerre des théâtres d'opérations extérieures (2 palms and 2 stars), and upon his return, he was assigned to Morocco at the Corps of the 4th Foreign Infantry Regiment 4^{e} RE in 1955.

He served in Algeria, where he was cited three times with Cross for Military Valour. He commanded notably the 2nd Mounted Saharan Company of the Foreign Legion (French: 2^{e} Compagnie Saharienne Portée de la Légion, 2^{e} CSPL).

At the beginning of 1960, he was a captain in the 1st Foreign Regiment 1^{e} RE at Aubagne then followed a course at the Superior War School (French: École Supérieure de Guerre), and served thereafter as a lieutenant-colonel in the general staff headquarters (French: état-major) in Paris beginning of 1970.

In 1974, he received the command of the 13th Demi-Brigade of Foreign Legion 13^{e} DBLE, promoted to rank of colonel in 1975 and received the Légion d'honneur in 1976. He left the command of the 13^{e} DBLE in the summer of 1976. He commanded thereafter French elements in Tchad from February until September 1980.

He was nominated to the first action of officer generals, at the rank of Général de brigade in quality of a Commandant of the Foreign Legion Groupment (1980–1982) and 31st Brigade (1981–1982), a post which he occupied from 1980 to 1982.

In 1981, the 150th anniversary of the French Foreign Legion (French: La Légion Étrangère) and the 50th anniversary of the Commandement de la Légion Étrangère (French: Commandement de la Légion Étrangère), was celebrated during the tenure of général Paul Lardry.

He was then accordingly designated to the superior commandment of the French Area Forces of the Indian Ocean stationed at the Réunion in 1983. He was accordingly promoted to général de division the same year.

In 1986, he was promoted to général de corps d'armée. He accordingly commanded the Force d'Action Rapide FAR and organized the following years several designated manoeuvers in Germany. In 1988, he was promoted to général d'armée and accordingly left the command of the FAR. He was admitted to the second section of officer generals in 1991.

== Recognitions and honors ==

- Grand Croix of the Légion d'honneur
- Grand croix de l'ordre national du Mérite
- Croix de guerre des théâtres d'opérations extérieures
- Croix de la Valeur militaire
- Médaille coloniale with clasp « Extrême-Orient » and clasp « Tchad »
- Médaille commémorative de la campagne d'Indochine with 2 stars for WIA
- Médaille commémorative des opérations de sécurité et de maintien de l'ordre en Afrique du Nord with clasp « Maroc » – « Algérie », "Sahara"

== See also ==
- Major (France)
- French Foreign Legion Music Band (MLE)
- Jacques Lefort
- Pierre Jeanpierre
- Pierre Darmuzai
- Saharan Méharistes Companies (méharistes sahariennes)
