= Operazione Locusta =

Italian Air Force Gulf War operation

- Part of Gulf War
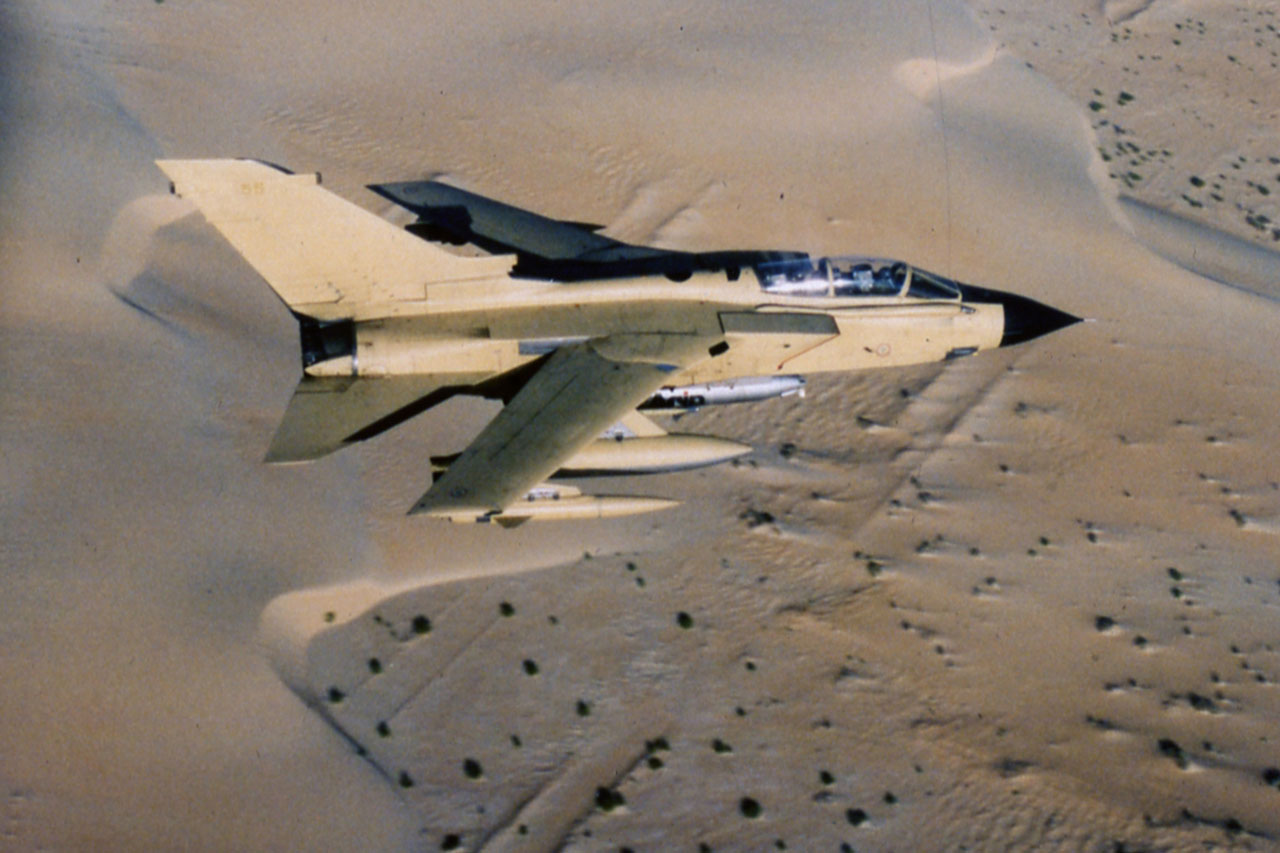
- One of the Italian Tornadoes used in the operation
Date	25 September 1990 – March 1991
Location	Iraq occupied Kuwait
Result	Coalition victory

Belligerents
Italy (as part of the Coalition)	Iraq

Commanders and leaders
Marshal Mario Arpino	

Units involved
Italian Air Force	Iraqi Armed Forces

Strength
10 Panavia Tornado IDS (initially 8); ~300 personnel	

Casualties and losses
1 Tornado lost 2 personnel captured (later released)	

Operazione Locusta (English: Operation Locust) is the code name given to the contribution of the Italian Air Force to the US-led Coalition during the 1991 Gulf War.

== Description ==
Following the invasion and annexation of Kuwait by Iraq, on September 25, 1990 the Italian Government sent eight multirole fighter bombers Tornado IDS (plus two spares) to the Persian Gulf. The aircraft, belonging to the 6th, 36th, and 50th Stormo, were deployed to Al Dhafra Air Base, near Abu Dhabi, in the United Arab Emirates.

These aircraft formed the "Autonomous Flight Department of the Italian Air Force in the Arabian Peninsula". The Department's staff, initially made up of 239 men, including twelve Carabinieri attached to the Air Operations Command for supervisory needs and military police, was subsequently brought to 314 elements.

The deployment of Italian aircraft was part of the international security system implemented by United Nations Security Council Resolution 678.

The use of Italian aircraft as part of the Desert Storm operation represented the first operational employment in combat missions of Italian Air Force aircraft after the end of World War II.

RF-104G tactical reconnaissance aircraft (for a total of 384 sorties and 515 flight hours) operated in Turkey under the NATO AMF (ACE Mobile Force NATO) as part of the Italian war effort. This cell had been deployed to Incirlik on 6 January 1991, following a NATO decision to protect against a possible Iraqi attempt to widen the conflict. Support transport aircraft carried out 244 missions for 4,156 hours of flight, ensuring logistical support for national air and naval units as well as the evacuation of nationals from areas at risk.

The RF-104Gs returned to Italy on March 11, 1991.

The Tornado fighter jets returned to the Gioia del Colle air base on March 15, 1991, two weeks after the end of the military operations. The return of Italian fighter planes to the homeland was welcomed by a ceremony attended by the Minister of Defence Virginio Rognoni, the Chief of Defense, General Domenico Nardini, and the Chief of Staff of the Italian Air Force, General Stelio Nardini.

== Operational history ==
Through the duration of the war, Italian aircrews conducted 226 sorties totaling 589 flight hours. General Mario Arpino was head of the Air Coordination Unit during the war operations in Saudi Arabia from October 1990 to March 1991.

During the conflict, the Italian Air Force recorded the loss of a single aircraft.

On the night between 17 and 18 January 1991, the first package of Italian aircraft took off.

Major Gianmarco Bellini (pilot) and Captain Maurizio Cocciolone (navigator) took off on board their fighter-bomber along with the other seven Italian aircraft and a formation of allied aircraft for the first mission that saw them employed in the airspace controlled by Iraqi forces.

The squadron's mission was to strike an arms depot (provisions, ammunition, and equipment) in southern Iraq, northwest of Kuwait City, defended by radar-controlled anti-aircraft artillery. Bellini and Cocciolone were the only ones capable of completing refueling in flight; all other aircraft, including 7 Italian Tornados and about 30 other aircraft from other countries, hindered by weather conditions, failed to approach the aircrew and had to return to base.

Bellini, as head crew, decided that their aircraft would have to go on alone, despite the risk posed by the enemy's defensive deployment. After receiving the OK by the air tactical command, the aircraft leveled off at an altitude of about 250 feet, activated the automatic terrain-following (TF) radar, and released their payload (5 Mk 83 bombs) on the target at around 4:30 in the morning. After about 40 seconds their plane was hit by Iraqi anti-aircraft artillery, trained to defend against low-altitude attacks, and the two Italian airmen had to eject. The bomber hit the ground about 20 km northwest of the Kuwaiti capital, a few hundred meters from an Iraqi Republican Guard barracks. The two airmen were immediately captured by Iraqi troops, separated, stripped of everything they had with them (including clothing and boots), and forced to wear a yellow suit, which qualified them as prisoners of war.

Major pilot Gianmarco Bellini and Captain navigator Maurizio Cocciolone were released at the end of the conflict, along with the other prisoners of war captured by the Iraqi forces.
