= Gianmarco Bellini =

Italian Air Force officer

- Born: 15 September 1958 (age 68); Montagnana, Italy
- Military career
- Allegiance: Italy
- Branch: Italian Air Force
- Service years: 1977–
- Rank: Generale di brigata aerea (Brigadier-General)
- Conflicts: Gulf War: Operazione Locusta (POW)
- Awards: Silver Medal of Military Valor

Gianmarco Bellini (born 15 September 1958) is an Italian Air Force officer who served with U.N. Coalition forces and was a prisoner of war during the First Gulf War.

== Career ==
Bellini enlisted in the Italian Air Force in 1977 and attended the Italian Accademia Aeronautica (Air Force Academy). He was then trained as a pilot at Laughlin Air Force Base in the United States. He has a degree in political science from the Federico II University in Naples, and a master's degree in strategic studies from the Air War College at Air University, based at Maxwell Air Force Base in Alabama, United States.

=== Gulf War ===
On the eve of the Operation Desert Storm the Italian government deployed eight Tornado Fighter-bombers on the Gulf Theatre of Operations. On 16 January 1991, coalition forces began concentrated air strikes on Iraqi military targets in Iraq and Kuwait.

On 18 January 1991, an Italian Tornado piloted by Major Gianmarco Bellini with Captain Maurizio Cocciolone as his navigator took off as part of a multi-national 48 planes squadron. Bellini and Cocciolone were the only members of the flight able to execute in-flight refuelling, while the other 47 aircraft failed and had to abort the mission. The mission profile dictated that the operation could be performed even by a single plane, so Bellini and Cocciolone went on. Right after dropping five bombs on the target at high speed and low altitude (thanks to the terrain following radar), they dropped the external fuel tanks to get out of the area as soon as possible, but their plane was hit by Iraqi anti aircraft fire. In an interview, Bellini said that multiple ZSU-23-4 "Shilka" locked them with the radar, and one shot hit the right rolleron and tore away almost 60% of the area. This caused at first an uncontrolled roll of one spin per second, then the pilot managed to reduce that to one speed every three seconds, but they were already close to the ground, and they had to eject. In that interview, Bellini said that when he ejected the plane was at 30 ft from the ground. They were captured by the Iraqi Republican Guard, even though their status was unknown at the time.

While Cocciolone was shown on Iraqi television on 20 January 1991, in a propaganda video, no news of Bellini was given initially, and he was feared to be a casualty. The two were kept separate for the whole time of their captivity. On 3 March 1991, both officers were released. Bellini holds numerous military decorations including the Silver Medal for Military Valor for his actions during the Operation Desert Storm.

Bellini and Cocciolone were the only Italian Prisoners of War of the entire war.

=== Later career ===
Bellini was appointed commanding officer of the Ghedi air base in 2001.

In 2023 Gianmarco Bellini became the subject of the award-winning short documentary Gianmarco Bellini: Gulf War POW directed by Italian filmmaker Maria Luisa Forenza and produced by filmmaker Daniel L. Bernardi.
