= Operation Nightingale (humanitarian mission) =

Operation Nightingale was the codename of the Singapore Armed Forces' (SAF) humanitarian mission to the 1991 Gulf War.

== Background ==
Following the invasion of Kuwait by Iraq on 2 August 1990, a massive international coalition was formed to deter and repel Iraqi forces in Kuwait. A request was made by the British Government for medical assistance. In response, a 30-strong SAF medical team led by MAJ (Dr) Tan Chi Chiu of the 205th General Hospital was assembled and flown to Saudi Arabia in a mission codenamed Operation Nightingale on 20 January 1991.

== Operation ==
The medical team was based in the British Army Rear Hospital at King Khalid International Airport in Riyadh and treated a total of 210 casualties. The mission ended on 13 March 1991 after a total of 54 days.
