= Michel Roquejeoffre =

French General (1933–2024)

Michel Roquejeoffre

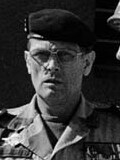
- Roquejeoffre during the Gulf War
- Born: 28 November 1933; Paris, France
- Died: 18 October 2024 (aged 90); Pamiers, France
- Military career
- Allegiance: France
- Branch: French Army
- Service years: 1952–1993
- Rank: Général d'armée
- Conflicts: Algerian War; Lebanese Civil War; Gulf War
- Awards: Legion of Merit; Legion of Honour

Michel Roquejeoffre (French pronunciation: [miʃɛl ʁɔkʒɔfʁ]; 28 November 1933 – 18 October 2024) was a French Army general. He commanded Operation Daguet, the French operations during the Gulf War. French forces, a part of the coalition forces, counted 18,000 soldiers and took a direct involvement in the battles with Iraqi forces, both on Kuwait and Iraqi territories.

Before that Roquejeoffre participated in the Algerian War and later missions in Chad, Lebanon and Cambodia. He entered Saint-Cyr in 1952. He retired in 1993.

Allied commander, U.S. General Norman Schwarzkopf Jr. described Roquejeoffre in his memoirs as one of his most trusted confidants during the war. Roquejeoffre was awarded the Legion of Merit by the United States for his services in the Gulf War.

Roquejeoffre died on 18 October 2024, at the age of 90.
