= Panhard ERC =

French armored car

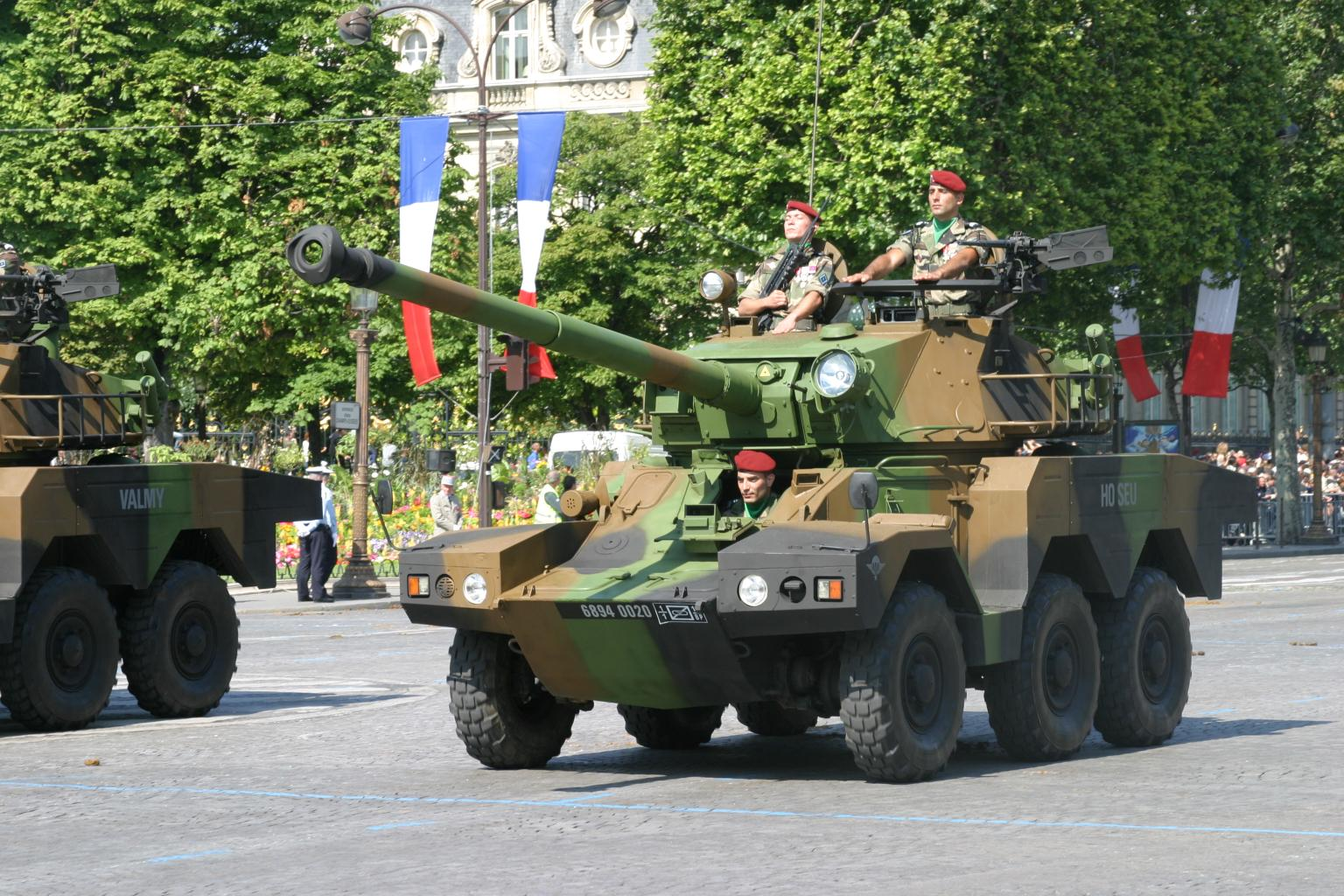
- An ERC-90 Sagaie of the French Army during a parade
- Type: Armored Car
- Place of origin: France

Service history
- In service: 1980–present
- Wars: Peacekeeping missions in Lebanon; Gulf War; Chiapas conflict Bosnian war Kosovo war First Ivorian Civil War; Chadian Civil War (2005–2010); Second Ivorian Civil War; Northern Mali; Boko Haram insurgency

Production history
- Designed: 1975
- Manufacturer: Panhard
- No. built: 411

Specifications
- Mass: 8.3 tons
- Length: 7.7 m (25 ft)
- Width: 2.50 m (8.2 ft)
- Height: 2.25 m (7.4 ft)
- Crew: 3
- Armour: 10 mm
- Main armament: 90 mm CN90 cannon
- Secondary armament: 2× MAS machine guns
- Engine: Peugeot V-6 Petrol engine 155 hp at 5,250 rpm
- Power/weight: 18.7 hp/tonne
- Suspension: 6×6 coil springs with shock absorbers
- Operational range: 730 km (450 mi)
- Maximum speed: 90 km/h (56 mph)

The Panhard ERC (Engin à Roues, Canon; "Wheeled device, cannon") is a French six-wheeled armoured car which is highly mobile and amphibious with an option of being NBC-proof. Two versions of the ERC entered large-scale production: the ERC-90 Lynx and the ERC-90 Sagaie. The main difference between the two versions is the type of turret and 90 mm gun fitted. Sagaie is French for assegai, a type of African spear.

== Background ==
The ERC was originally a private venture by Panhard aimed at the export market. It was developed in the latter half of the 1970s as a heavier, six-wheeled successor to Panhard's highly successful AML range of armoured vehicles.

=== Design ===
The ERC and VCR are a family of six wheel armoured reconnaissance vehicles. The ERC is the cannon-armed turret model. The VCR is the armoured personnel carrier version. ERC is the French abbreviation of term Engin à Roues, Canon or Gun-armed Wheeled Vehicle. The ERC shares many components of the VCR vehicles. Two main versions of the ERC were developed: first the ERC F1 90 Lynx, then the ERC F4 90 Sagaie. The Lynx appeared about 1977 and the Sagaie followed approximately two years later in 1979. The Lynx was developed primarily as an armoured reconnaissance vehicle. The Sagaie was also an armoured reconnaissance vehicle, with the added secondary role of tank-destroyer.

In 1977, Panhard offered the ERC and VCR to the French Army as an armoured personnel carrier (APC) and gun-armed reconnaissance vehicle. The Army instead chose the VAB four-wheeled armoured vehicle from Saviem for the larger APC contract, and the AMX 10 RC from GIAT for the reconnaissance requirement. Panhard also offered the vehicles to France's Mobile Gendarmerie, a much smaller order, but the Gendarmerie chose the Saviem VBC-90. Panhard later found success for both the VRC and ERC in the world export market, and later with the ERC version with the French Army, entering service in 1984.

=== Production history ===
The first production order for the ERC 90 F1 Lynx was in October 1979 from Argentina, for 36 units, to be used by Argentine Marines to patrol the long border between Argentina and Chile. The second large order was from Mexico, for 42 units in early 1981. Both countries ordered the ERC Lynx version because it could elevate or depress its 90mm cannon over a wider range for operations in steep mountain terrain.

Further export orders followed. Both nations also appreciated the all-terrain mobility of the Lynx which is enhanced by the capability to raise or lower the central pair of wheels depending on terrain condition, especially in sandy or muddy ground. All versions of the ERC are also equipped with two hydrojets behind the rear wheels and require no preparation for amphibious operations.

=== ERC 90 F4 Sagaie ===
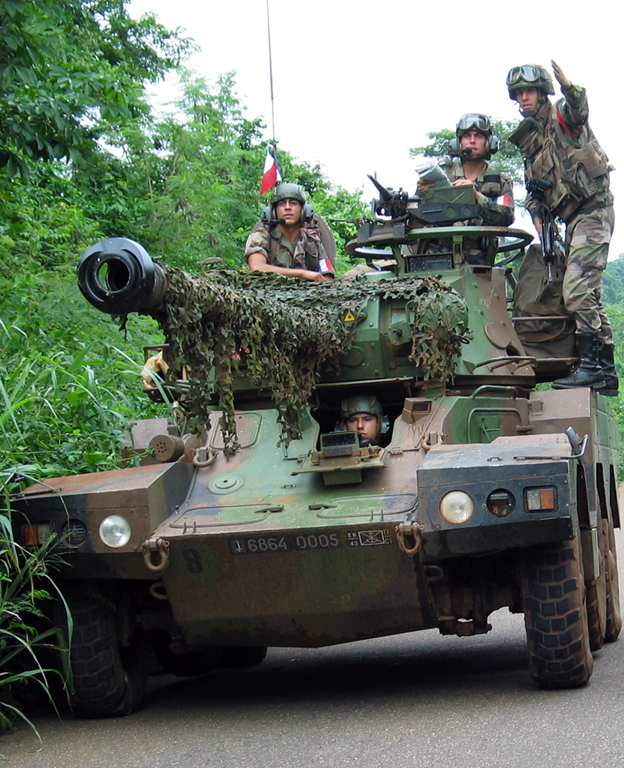
An ERC Sagaie of the 1 RHP in Ivory Coast, 2003

Shortly after the ERC 90 F1 Lynx had been built for export, Panhard recognized the need for a cost-effective light armoured vehicle that could defeat a more modern main battle tank (MBT), like the Russian T-72, which was being exported to many nations. The Lynx version could only fire medium-velocity HEAT rounds in the anti-tank role, which lacked the penetration to defeat the more modern MBTs. Panhard designed a turret which mounted the long barrel F4 90mm smooth bore-cannon developed by GIAT, and designated the vehicle the ERC 90 F4 Sagaie.

The F4 90mm could fire APFSDS (Armour Piercing Fin Stabilised Discarding Sabot) rounds at a much higher velocity than the Lynx's F1 90mm. GIAT and Panhard both claimed it could penetrate heavy armour at 2,000 metres. For a while, GIAT engineers could not find a suitable muzzle brake for the Sagaie which would not interfere with the firing of APFSDS rounds, but found a suitable solution using a muzzle brake design from the older AMX-13 tank.

Ivory Coast was the first export customer, ordering five Sagaies to replace its aging AMX-13s in the light armour role. At the time, the French Army was organising the Fast Deployment Force (FDF) for overseas military missions, mainly in Africa or the Middle East. The main core of the FDF was the French Army's 9th Marine Infantry Division and the 11th Parachute Division. To make the new FDF "more muscular" a new unit was activated, the 31st Heavy Half Brigade (31 DBL), with two regiments. One regiment was to be armed with vehicles mounting the HOT wire-guided missile, and the other with cannon-armed vehicles that could provide both reconnaissance and a limited tank-killing role.

The French Army had at first planned on equipping the second regiment with the AMX-10RC, but were told that this vehicle was not suitable for transport by the French Air Force Transall C-160 or its allies' Hercules C-130 aircraft, due to size and weight issues. In addition, most of the bridges in Africa had only a 6 to 8 ton load capacity. So instead of the larger AMX-10RC, which was already in service with the French Army, the French Army Staff took the surprise step in December 1980 of ordering the Sagaie for the future FDF. To date, the Sagaie has proved very useful for the French Army in its African bases and even in urban conditions during the Siege of Sarajevo. The last known combat uses of the Sagaie were with French troops stationed in Ivory Coast on a peace-keeping mission between two rival factions, and in Mali in 2013.

==== Sagaie upgrade ====
The French Army upgraded between 2005 and 2009 160 of its 192 ERC's in service with a diesel MTU 4-cylinder 170 hp engine, coupled to an automatic gearbox made by Renk and made enhancements to the turret to improve observation, fire control and command.

=== ERC-90 Sagaie 2 (twin-engine) ===
A weakness of the Sagaie is its low power-to-weight ratio. The Sagaie 2, announced in 1985, is an ERC, extended with two Peugeot XD 3T four-cylinder turbocharged diesel 98 hp engines, the same engine used on the VBL (Light Armoured Vehicle).

Six were ordered by Gabon, bearing the designation ERC-2; they are equipped with the TTB 190 turret designed by SAMM.

A prototype equipped with two PRV V6 engines was built as a private venture, but none were ordered.

== Variants ==
- EMC 81: Fire support version armed with 81mm mortar in an Hispano-Suiza EMC turret.
- ERC 20 Kriss: Anti-aircraft version with 2× 20 mm autocannons.
- ERC 60-20: Fitted with Hispano-Suiza 60-20 Serval turret armed with a 60 mm mortar and a 20 mm autocannon.
- ERC 90D (Diesel): Fitted with a diesel engine.
- ERC 90 F1 Lynx: Fitted with the Hispano-Suiza Lynx 90 turret as fitted to the Panhard AML.
- ERC 90 F4 Sagaie: Fitted with GIAT TS 90 turret with long barrel high velocity cannon that can fire APFSDS anti-tank rounds.
- ERC 90 Sagaie 2: Slightly larger version fitted with twin engines and improved TTB 190 turret.
- ERC 90 NG: Modernised version fitted with diesel engine and CMI Cockerill CSE90 turret.

== Operators ==
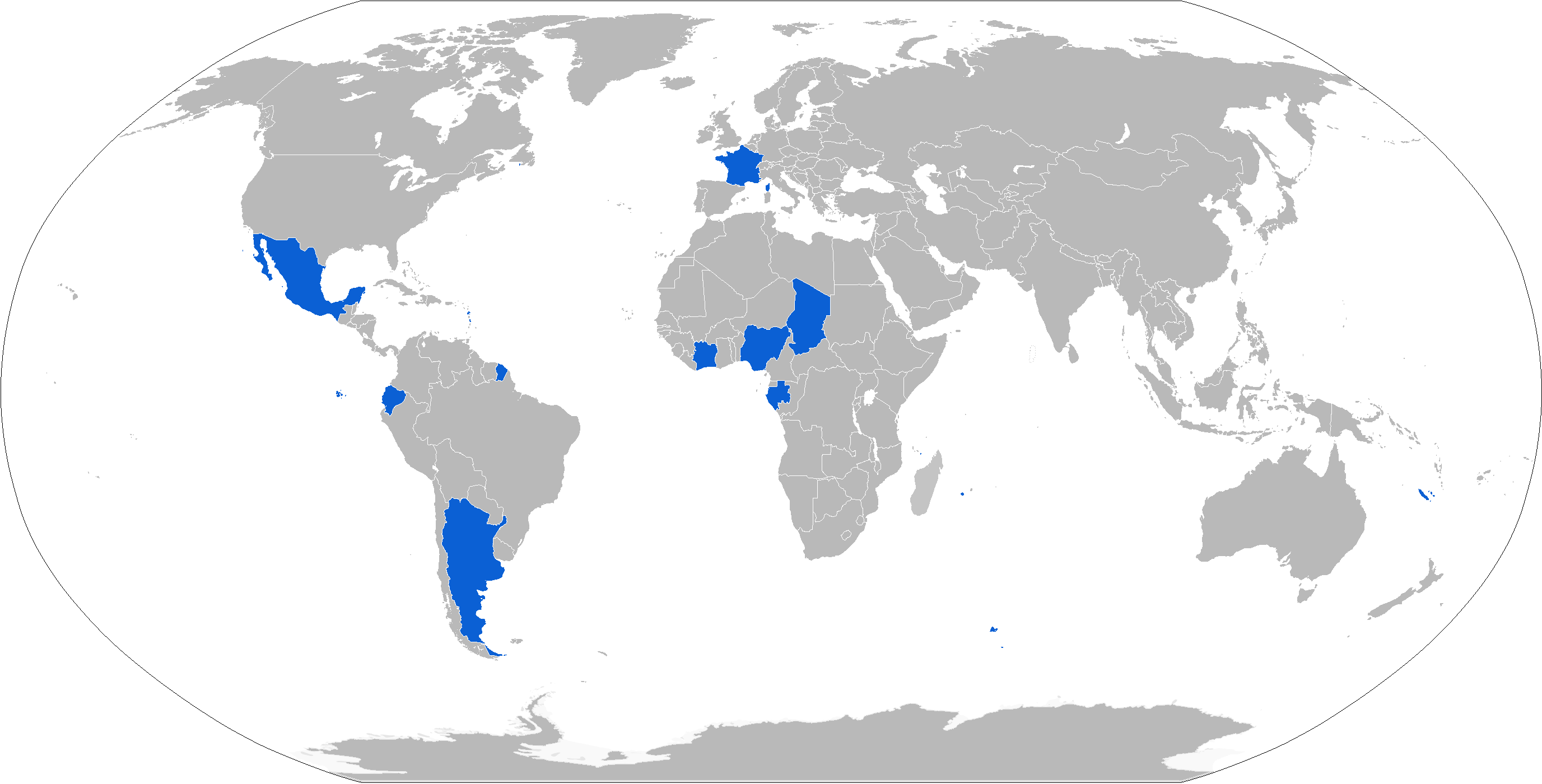
A map of ERC 90 operators in blue

- Argentina: 12 ERC-90 Lynx.
- Chad: 4 ERC-90 Lynx. 9 more offered by France in January 2021.
- Gabon: 6 ERC-90 Sagaie, 4 ERC-20 Kriss.
- Ivory Coast: 7 ERC-90 Sagaie.
- Mexico: 120 ERC-90 Lynx.
- Nigeria: 40 ERC-90 Sagaie, 40 ERC-90 Lynx.

=== Former operators ===
- France: 190 ERC-90 Sagaie. All ERC were retired in 2022.
