= René Laverdure =

- Born: 27 January 1862; Paris, France
- Died: 13 November 1914 (aged 52); El Herri, Morocco
- Military career
- Allegiance: France
- Branch: French Army
- Service years: 1880–1914
- Rank: Lieutenant colonel
- Conflicts: Tonkin Campaign; Zaian War

Lieutenant-Colonel René Philippe Laverdure (27 January 1862 – 13 November 1914) was a French army officer. He enlisted in the army as a private soldier in 1880 and saw active service with the 1st Marine Infantry Regiment and the Regiment de Tirailleurs Annamites in the Tonkin Campaign in modern Vietnam. He was promoted through the army's non-commissioned ranks and became an adjutant in 1884. A display of bravery on the battlefield won him a commission later that year.

Laverdure served as an officer with various Marine Infantry Regiments and the Senegalese Tirailleurs, including active duty in Madagascar, being promoted to captain, before returning to Tonkin in 1894. Laverdure served in Tonkin with the marine infantry and the 3rd Regiment de Tirailleurs Tonkinois. He returned to Madagascar as a staff officer and later transferred to various Colonial Infantry and Garrison Infantry regiments on the island.

Promoted to chef de bataillon in 1902 and subsequently to lieutenant-colonel Laverdure saw action in the Zaian War. He was placed in charge of a combined arms force based at Khénifra in the fight against Berber leader Mouha ou Hammou Zayani. Laverdure led an attack on Hammou's camp against the instructions of his superior, General Hubert Lyautey, and was decisively defeated at the Battle of El Herri. Laverdure lost his life in the battle and much of his command was wiped out. The situation in Morocco was momentarily perilous but the French eventually won the war in 1921.

== Early life and career ==
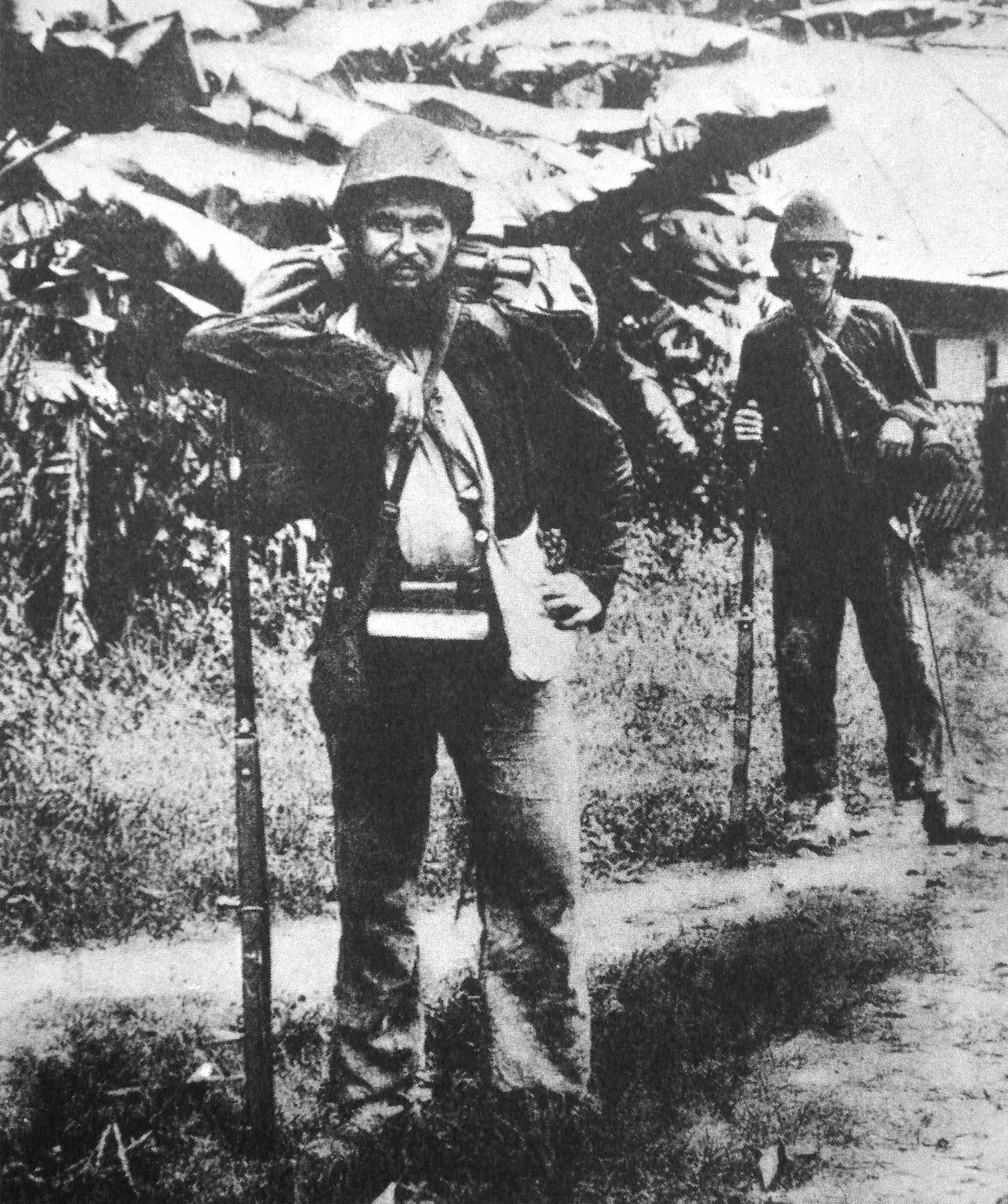
French Marine Infantry in Tonkin

Laverdure was born in Paris, France, on 27 January 1862. His father was Charles Louis Joseph Laverdure and his mother was Josephine Laverdure.

Laverdure enlisted in the French Army on 19 April 1880 as a private soldier in the 1st Marine Infantry Regiment. He was promoted to corporal on 30 November 1880 and to sergeant on 1 September 1881. The unit was then posted to French Cochinchina and Laverdure accompanied them there, arriving on 19 January 1882. Laverdure transferred to the colonial Regiment de Tirailleurs Annamites (central Vietnamese riflemen) on 15 March 1882 and received promotion to quartermaster sergeant on 15 April and to sergeant-major on 15 May. During this time the unit was serving on campaign in the Tonkin region. He achieved the senior NCO rank of adjudant on 22 February 1884 and was commissioned from the ranks for bravery on 1 May 1884, returning briefly to the 1st Marine Infantry as a sub-lieutenant before transferring to the 3rd Marine Infantry Regiment on 6 May 1884.

== Commissioned career ==
Lavderdure left Tonkin on 6 September 1884 and was promoted to lieutenant on 11 May 1886, he transferred in that rank to the Senegalese Tirailleurs eight days later. He served with the tirailleurs in Senegal from 5 August that year, joining the 2nd Marine Infantry Regiment on 20 March 1888 and leaving Senegal with them on 15 May. Laverdure was deployed to Madagascar on 12 September 1889 and joined the 4th Marine Infantry Regiment there on 1 January 1890. In July he transferred to the 19th Marine Infantry Regiment of Diego Suarez before returning to the 1st Marine Infantry on 10 August 1891, leaving Madagascar on 21 December.

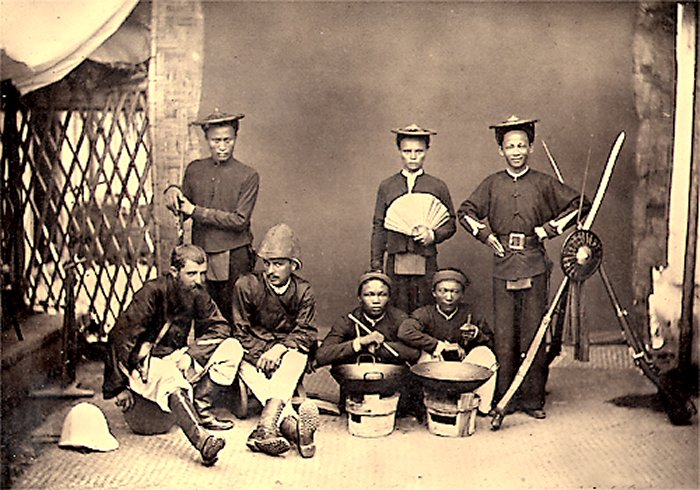
Tonkinese Tirailleurs with their French officers

Laverdure was promoted to captain on 19 December 1892, arrived in Tonkin again on 1 April 1894 and transferred to the 3rd Regiment de Tirailleurs Tonkinois on 3 May that year. He was appointed a chevalier of the Legion of Honour on 5 February 1896. A transfer to the 8th Marine Infantry Regiment followed on 7 May 1897 and he left Tonkin on 2 August. Laverdure became a staff officer in Madagascar on 28 May 1898. He was transferred to the 2nd Garrison Regiment on 25 April 1900, left Madagascar on 21 August, and joined the 2nd Colonial Infantry Garrison Regiment on 1 January 1901. He was transferred again to the 21st Colonial Infantry Regiment on 17 January, returned to Madagascar on 10 March and transferred to the 15th Colonial Infantry Regiment on 10 May. Laverdure was promoted to chef de bataillon (approximately equal to major) on 30 December 1902, left Madagascar on 25 September 1903 and transferred to the 5th Colonial Infantry Regiment on 12 October that year. He was appointed an officer of the Legion of Honour on 31 May 1904 and transferred to the 25th Colonial Infantry Regiment on 11 May 1904.

== Zaian War ==
During the Zaian War Laverdure, since promoted to lieutenant-colonel, was placed in command of a groupe mobile (a combined arms force) based at Khénifra, on the frontiers of the French protected zone in Morocco. During July 1914 Laverdure's force came increasingly under attack and the men under his command were reduced due to the requirements of reinforcements in France for the First World War. Laverdure saw an opportunity to attack the leader of the Berber forces, Mouha ou Hammou Zayani, when he set up camp at El Herri, a small village 15 kilometres (9.3 mi) from Khénifra, for the winter. French commander Lyautey was hopeful of a negotiated end to the war and twice refused Laverdure permission to attack the Berber camp.

However Laverdure decided to disobey his orders to remain in Khénifra and marched on El Herri with almost the entire garrison on 13 November. His troops successfully attacked the camp during the Battle of El Herri but were overwhelmed during their retreat resulting in the deaths of 623 French, North African and Senegalese troops, including Laverdure. Lyautey was briefly of the opinion that the event would cause the loss of the whole of Morocco but stabilised the situation and eventually won the war in 1921.

René Laverdure had married Adile Blanche on 20 February 1901 and they kept a house at Touffreville, Upper Normandy. Laverdure held the Tonkin Expedition commemorative medal and was an officer of the Order of the Dragon of Annam.
