= 2nd Marine Infantry Regiment =

- 2^{e} Régiment d'Infanterie de Marine
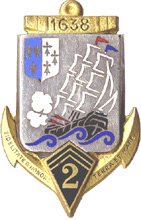
- Regimental insignia
- Active: 1831 - present
- Country: France
- Branch: Marine Troops; French Army
- Type: Regiment
- Role: Infantry; Amphibious warfare Urban warfare Close-quarters combat
- Part of: 9th Marine Infantry Brigade; 1st Division
- Garrison/HQ: Le Mans, France
- Mottos: Fidelitate et honore, terra et mare (Fidelity and honor on land and sea).
- Colors: Red and blue
- Anniversaries: Bazeilles
- Battle honours: Bomarsund 1854; Puebla 1863; Bazeilles 1870; Tuyen-Quan 1885; La Marne 1914; Champagne 1915; La Somme 1916; L'Aisne-Verdun 1917; Kub Kub 1941; El Alamein 1942; Takrouna 1943; Ponté Corvo 1944; Toulon 1944; Colmar 1945; Indochine 1947–1954; AFN 1952–1962

Insignia
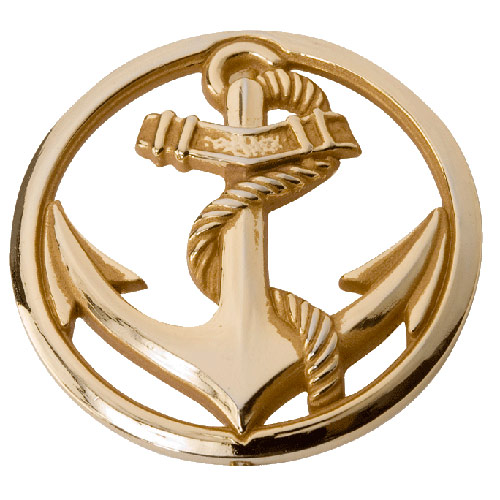
- Beret badge of the Troupes de Marine
- Abbreviation: 2^{e} RIMa

The 2nd Marine Infantry Regiment (French: 2^{e} Régiment d'Infanterie de Marine, 2^{e} RIMa) is an infantry regiment of the Troupes de marine in the French Army, the only regiment to bear 16 battle honours inscriptions of the regimental colors. The regiment is one of the "quatre vieux" regiments of the Troupes de marine, with the 1st Marine Infantry Regiment 1^{er} RIMa, the 3rd Marine Infantry Regiment 3^{e} RIMa and the 4th Marine Infantry Regiment 4^{e} RIMa (dissolved in 1998); also, alongside the 1st Marine Artillery Regiment 1^{er} RAMa as well as the 2nd Marine Artillery Regiment 2^{e} RAMa which formed the Blue Division.

== Creation and different nominations ==
- 1622: Creation by the cardinal Richelieu of the Compagnie Ordinaire de la Mer.
- 1822: Ordinance of the King prescribing the formation of Marine Infantry Regiments (French: Régiments d'Infanterie de la Marine).
- The Royal Ordinance by Louis Philippe I, the King of the French of May 14, 1831, created two infantry regiments assigned to the ordinary service of garrisons in the French colonies (uninterrupted direct filiation of the 2^{e} RIMa from that date until the present).
- 1870: 2nd Marching Marine Infantry Regiment.
- March 1, 1890: doubling of the regiment: formation of the 6th Colonial Infantry Regiment
- 1900 - 1942: designated as 2nd Colonial Infantry Regiment 2^{e} RIC, and garrisoned at Brest.
- 1941 - 1945: 1/2 brigade DFL.
- 1945 - 1947: designated 2nd Colonial Infantry Regiment.
- 1947: 2nd Colonial Infantry Battalion, 2^{e} BIC.
- 1947 - 1954: Marching Battalion of the 2^{e} RIC in Indochina, then Algeria.
- 1951 - 1955: 2nd Colonial Infantry Battalion.
- 1958–present: 2nd Colonial Infantry Regiment 2^{e} RIC designated as 2nd Marine Infantry Regiment 2^{e} RIMa.

== History ==
Since 1822, and until 2012, the unit has endured the loss of 5000 members.

=== Wars of the Revolution & Empire ===
- 1813: German Campaign of 1813
  - October 16–19: Battle of Leipzig
- 1814: Campaign of France
  - February 14, 1818: Battle of Vauchamps

=== 1815 to 1848 ===
- 1823: Spanish expedition; campaign Madagascar and South America (1829).
- Conquest of Marquesas Islands and Society Islands (1842–1847).

=== Second Empire ===
- 1854: Bomarsund Franco-British Campaign in the Baltic Sea.
- August 31, 1854: the 2^{e} RIMa, stationed at Rochefort moved to Brest.
- Crimean War.
- Second French Intervention in Mexico: siege of Puebla.
- Campaigns in the Extreme-Orient.
- 1869: the regiment was distributed between Brest, Cochinchine and Guadeloupe.
- August 17, 1870: the 2nd Marine Infantry Regiment 2^{e} RIMa was part of the Armée de Châlons (1870) (French: Armée de Châlons (1870)) of Marshal de MacMahon.

With the 3rd Marching Marine Infantry Regiment of colonel Lecamus, the 2^{e} under the orders of colonel Alleyron formed the 2nd Brigade of général Charles Martin des Pallières. This 2nd Brigade with the 1st Brigade of général Reboul, three batteries de 4, two batteries de 4 and a machine gun of the Marine Artillery Regiment, on engineer company constituted the 3rd Infantry Division commanded by division general de Vassoigne. This infantry division evolved at the corps of the 12th Army Corps having for commander-in-chief division general Lebrun.

- August 23–26: Marching towards the East.
- August 31, 1870: Battle of Bazeilles.
- For a first time, the 2nd Marine engaged in combat on metropolitan soil. On August 31 and September 1, 1870, engaged at the corps of the Blue Division, the 2nd Marine Infantry Regiment 2^{e} RIMa disappeared in a heroic battle against the Prussians, until the "last shot" (French: « dernière cartouche »).

=== 1870 to 1914 ===
- During the Paris Commune in 1871, the regiment participated with the Armée Versaillaise.
- Operations of the campagne du Soudan (1882).
- Tonkin Campaign (1882-1883).
- Expedition of the Formose and occupation of Pescadores islands (1884).
- At the Siege of Tuyên Quang: 600 men of the regiment unblocked the garrison.
- Madagascar (1885).
- First Dahomey campaign (1889).
- Struggle against the Boxer Rebellion in China (1900).
- Moroccan Campaign (1910).

=== World War I ===
- 1914: still stationed at Brest, the regiment was part of the 1st Colonial Brigade of the 3rd Colonial Infantry Division 3^{e} DIC.

Reconstituted more than ten times, having endured for 52 months with daily struggles of nearly 20,000 men killed, wounded or disappeared, the 2nd Colonial Infantry Regiment 2^{e} RIC has participated to all the major battles of the conflict. The regiment received 4 citations at the orders of the armed forces as well as the fourragere with colors of the Médaille militaire.

==== 1914 ====
- Operations of the IIIrd Army and IVth Army:
- Battle of the Frontiers,
- August 22: Battle of Rossignol
- August 24: Saint-Vincent.
- November 17–18: Offensives of Argonne, wooden forest de la Gruerie

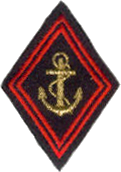
left arm insignia, with anchor of the marine infantry.

==== 1915 ====
- July - August: Operations in Argonne.
- September 25 - October 6: Second Battle of Champagne.

==== 1916 ====
- July: Battle of the Somme: Barleux, Belloy-en-Santerre.

==== 1917 ====
- April - May: Le Chemin des Dames.
- October 25 - November 6: Verdun 1917: Les Chambrettes.

==== 1918 ====
- July 12–23: Mailly-Raineval.
- August 8: Les Éparges.
- November 7-10: Hauts-de-Meuse.

=== Interwar period ===
In 1930: 2nd Colonial Infantry Regiment was stationed at Brest.

In 1939: Tripoli in the region of Syria (now in Lebanon).

=== World War II ===
1939

- Part of the 4th Colonial Infantry Division (4e Division d'Infanterie Coloniale, 4e DIC).
- In September 1939 occupied the German village of Schweix during the abortive Saar Offensive.

==== 1940 ====
- On 17 May 1940 transferred with the 4e DIC to the region of Amiens.
- The 2e RIC defended the junction of the Somme and Noye rivers, holding the towns of Longueau and Boves.
- Second battalion largely annihilated during a night action near Remiencourt on 6 June while covering the withdrawal of the regiment, with only about 100 men escaping German encirclement.
- First battalion surrounded and destroyed in the Bois de la Morlière while attempting to withdraw under cover of darkness during the night of 8–9 June.
- By 10 June, when the remnants of the 4e DIC regrouped south of the Oise, roughly 150 men of the 2e RIC remained.

==== 1941 ====
With the Free French Brigade of the Orient:

- Battle of Keren, February 23
- Battle of Keren, February 26
- Massaoua, April 8

==== 1942 ====
- The 2nd Brigade of Free France was officially formed in Syria in April 1942. The brigade participated to the campaigns in Libya (Battle of El Alamein) 1942 and Tunisia.

==== 1943 ====
- Battle of Takrouna, May 11, 1943
- Italian Campaign

==== 1944 ====
- Battle of Pontecorvo
- Campaign of France, Toulon and Colmar.

==== 1945 ====
- By orders of the général Charles de Gaulle, on May 25, 1945, the 2nd brigade of the 1^{re} DFL retook the traditions of the 2nd Marine Infantry Regiment.
- Général de Gaulle, made the 2nd Colonial Infantry Regiment 2^{e} RIC, a Compagnon de la Libération and awarded the regiment, the croix de la Libération, while the fourragere received olive colors of the Croix de guerre 1939-1945 (August 7, 1945).

=== 1945 to present ===
- Indochina War where the 1st Marching Battalion was attributed the croix de guerres des TOE with palm. The Légion d'honneur was awarded to the regimental colors on July 14, 1952.

Regimental Insignia of the 2nd Colonial Infantry Regiment, 2^{e} RIC.

- Algeria: the 2^{e} RIC mounted with 3 battalions was sent in full to Algeria sectors Khenchela, El Kantara and Batna (1954–1959), sectors of Orleans Town, Valley Soumman (1959–1962).
- At the cease-fire on March 19, 1962, in Algeria, the 2^{e} RIMa constituted among 91 other regiments, part of the 114 local forces. The I/2^{e} RIMa was a local force of the Algerian order of battle, 442°UFL-UFO and la 443°UFO, composed of 10% metropolitan military and 90% Muslim Military, and which during the transition period were at the service of the executive provisional Algerian authority, until the independence of Algeria (Evian accords of March 18, 1962).
- The regiment garrisoned in the Sarthe in 1963: a part in Le Mans, a party to Auvours.
- The 2^{e} RIMa participated since professionalization in 1978 to numerous operations on the continents. The 2nd Marine illustrated capability notably in Chad in Mauritania in Lebanon (part of Multinational Force in Lebanon), former Yugoslavia in Albania in Central in Côte d'Ivoire in Guyana in New Caledonia at Senegal in Kosovo in Bosnia and Herzegovina at Cameroon in Macedonia, Afghanistan.
- During the first Gulf War, the regiment was cited at the orders of the brigade on May 10, 1991, this citation included the croix de guerre des TOE with bronze star.
- Ivory Coast - 2003 and 2004: the regiment was deployed in the south-west of the republic and assured the return of the refugees while pushing back rebels that terrorized the region. Stability required two months. Accordingly, the regiment was sent to center of the country. The mission was to assure the neutrality of the confidence zone. The regiment endured the loss of the 3 Marines at Bouake on November 6, 2004.
- Bosnia and Herzegovina: the 2^{e} RIMa illustrated capability on May 27, 1995, by retaking an observation post point of the FORPRONU. The regiment was the last French regiment to arm and command the Franco-Spanish Battalion. The mission was to collect the detained arms and facilitate the reorganization of French forces in the zone.
- Tchad in 2005, the regiment composed with a squadron of the 1^{er} RIMa, the terrestrial group of French elements based in Tchad.
- In 2006, the 2^{e} RIMa was engaged in Lebanon in the evacuation of French personnel and the containment of populations in danger.
- 500 Marines of the 2^{e} RIMa reinforced elements of other regiments (infantry, artillery engineer, armoured cavalry, aerial means) formed officially the Tactical Interarm Group (GTIA or battle group) Richelieu since November 25, 2010. This groupment joined Suroni in Afghanistan a couple day later for a mission of 6 months. (The 2^{e} RIMa, reinforced by the artillery of the 11th Marine Artillery Regiment 11^{e} RAMa as well as 110 sapeurs of the 6th Engineer Regiment 6^{e} RG, the Régiment d'infanterie-chars de marine RICM, small complementary units of the 92 Infantry Regiment, a detachment of the 132nd Infantry Regiment, then 3rd Marine Infantry Regiment 3^{e} RIMa) middle of June 2011, the marsouins were relieved by the battle group of the 152nd Infantry Regiment. On July 7, 2011, battalion Richelieu would be dissolved.
- The regiment endured the loss of 2 marsouins in Kapisa on April 20, 2011, resulting from a mine explosion which wounded three others.
- On May 18, 2011 Marsouin 1st Class Cyril Louaisil died, and four others were injured following an accidental explosion in eastern Afghanistan.
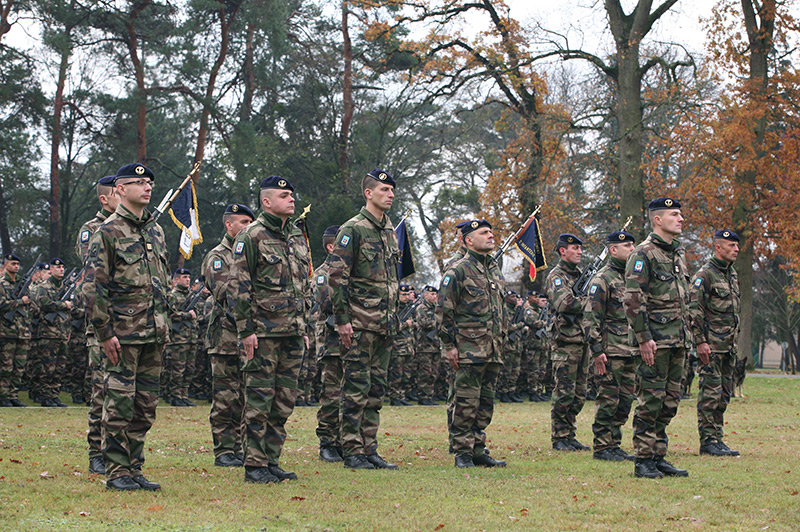
Ceremony of the enacting of battle group Richelieu of the 2nd Marine Infantry Regiment.

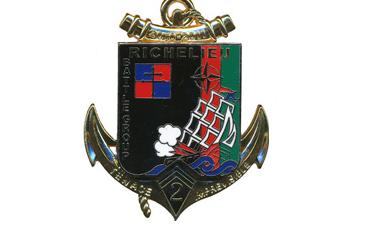
Regiment Insignia of the 2^{e} RIMa, Tactical Richelieu Group, GTR 2012-2011.

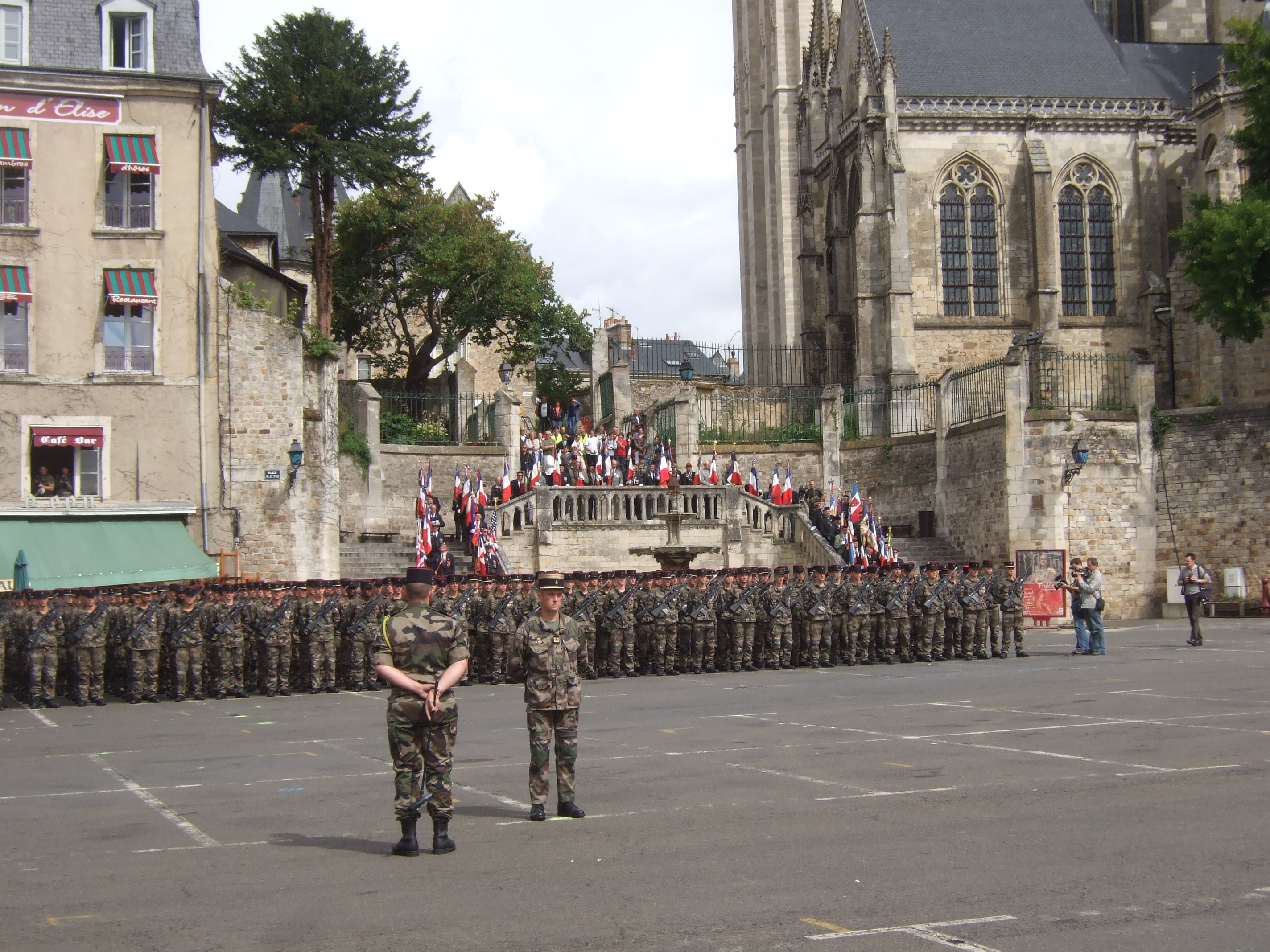
Ceremony of dissolution of the Tactical Richelieu Group/Battalion on July 7, 2011, following the return from a mission.

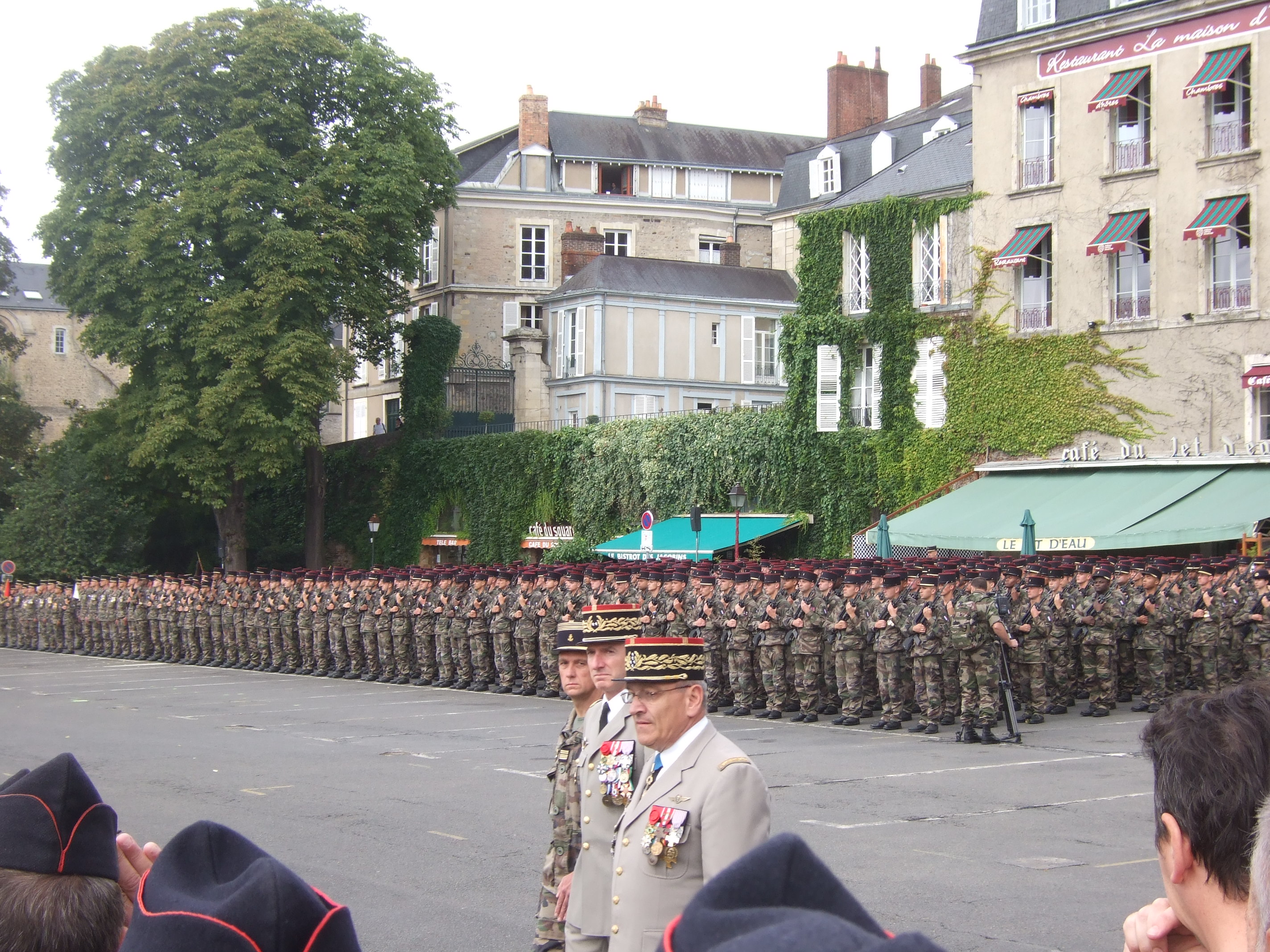
Following the dissolution of the battalion.

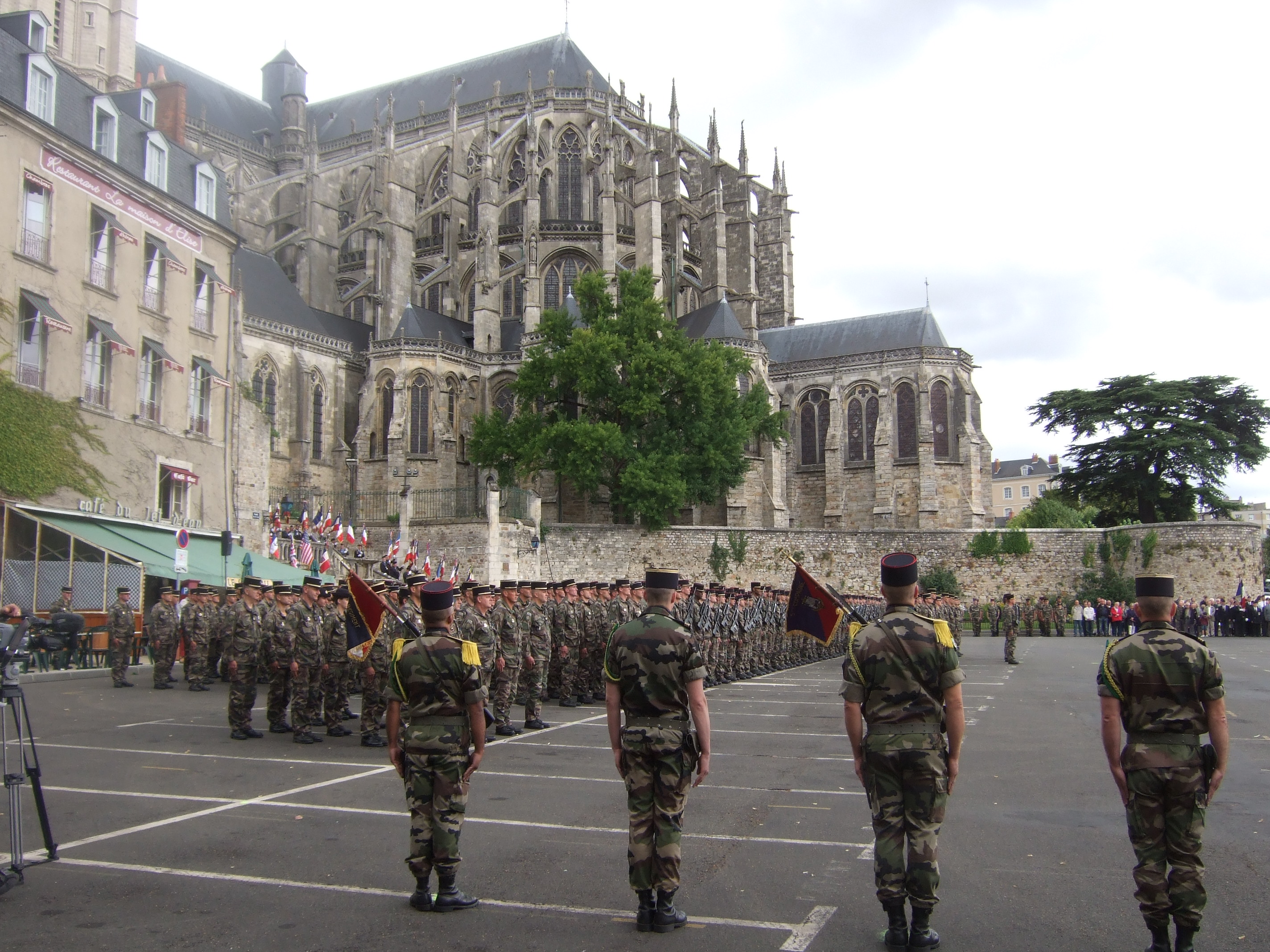
Following the dissolution of the battalion.

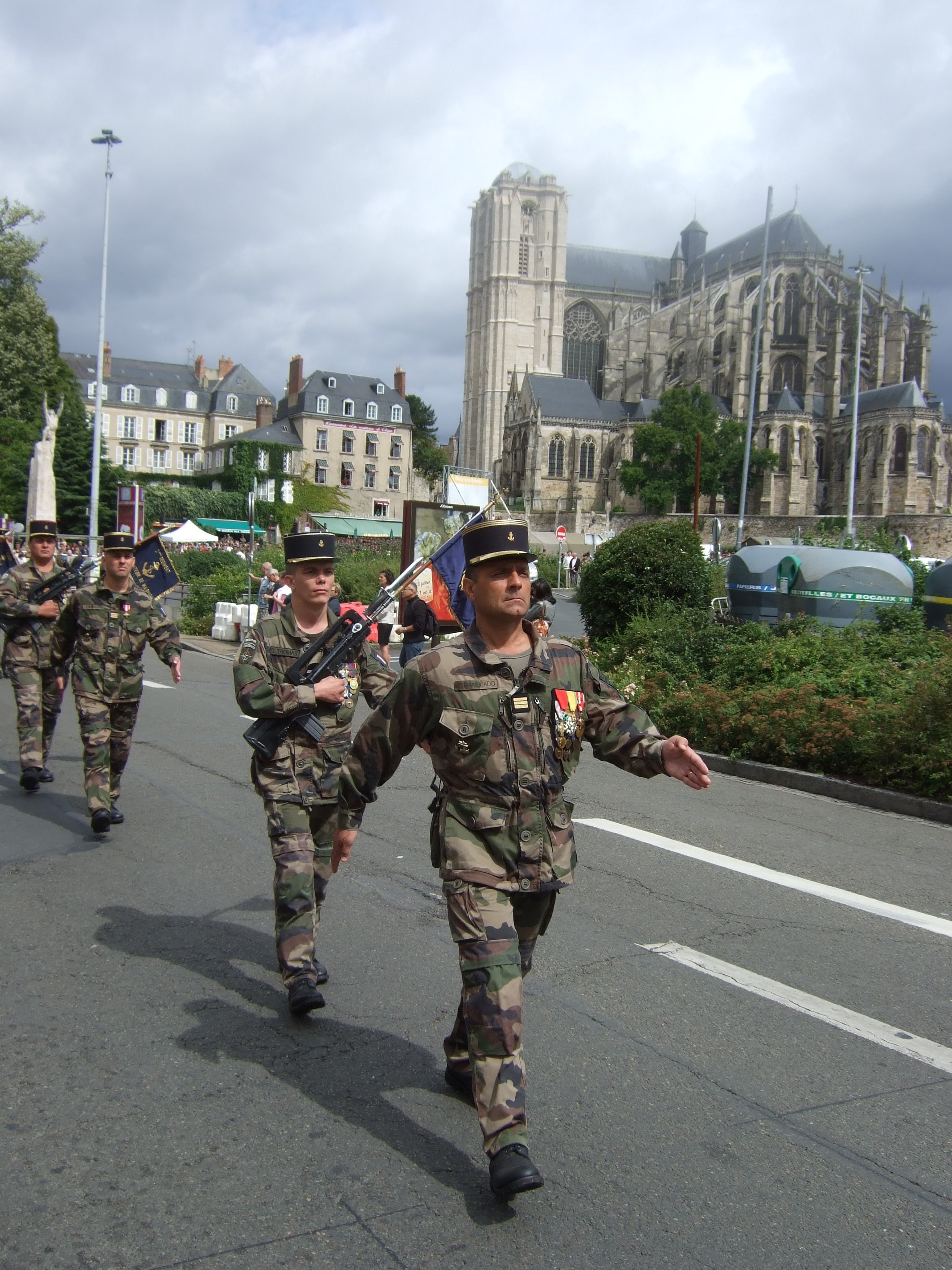
Following the dissolution of the battalion.

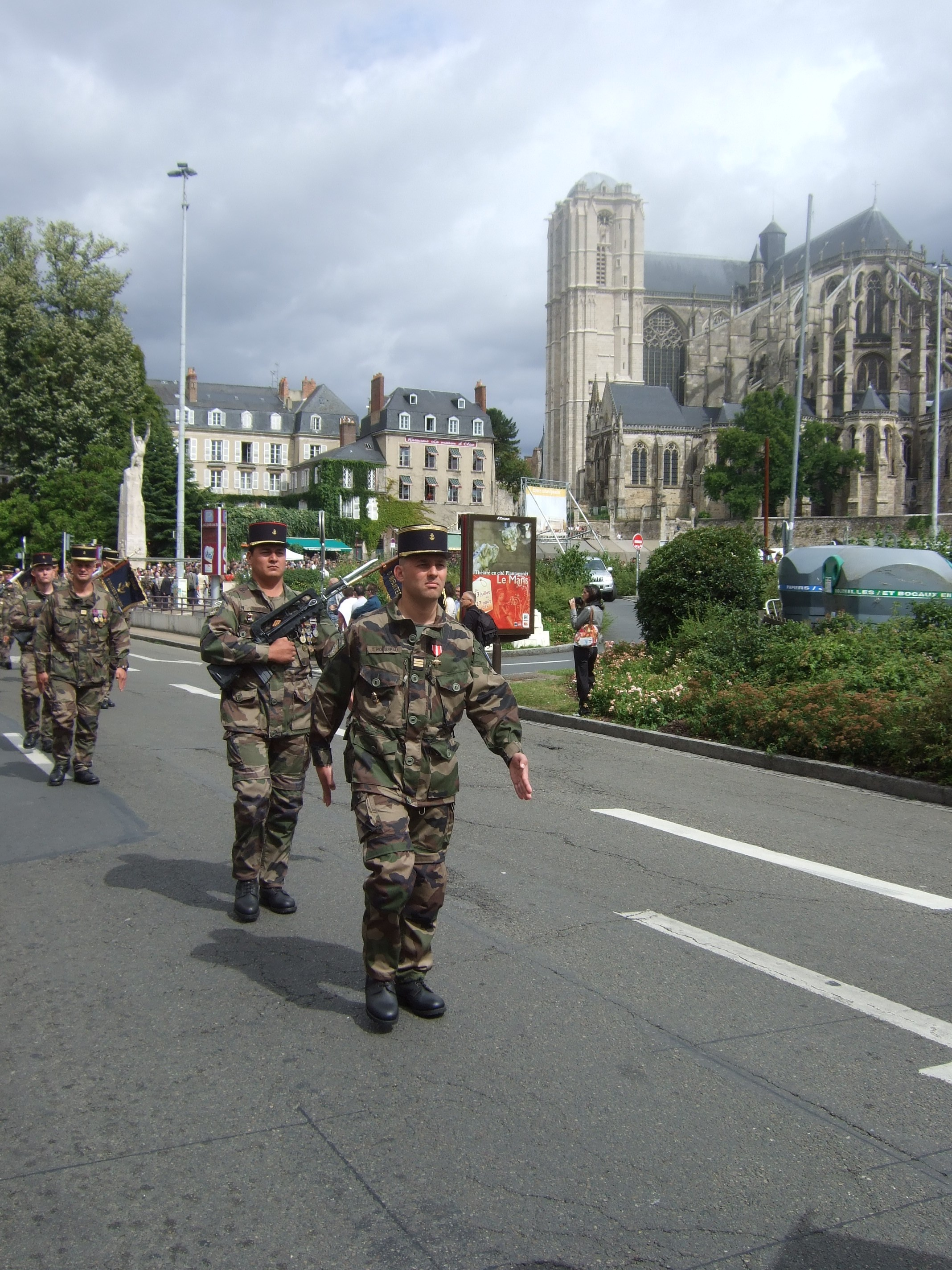
Following the dissolution of the battalion.
- 2013: Mali, Operation Serval. A unit of the 2^{e} RIMa integrated the 1st interarm tactical group, the unit intervened with units of the 21st Marine Infantry Regiment 21^{e} RIMa, the 1^{er} RHP, the 3rd Marine Artillery Regiment 3^{e} RAMa, the 6th Engineer Regiment 6^{e} RG, the 3^{e} RPIMa, the 1st Foreign Cavalry Regiment 1^{er} REC and CPA 20. The unit conducted the operation alongside the Malian Army on January 28, 2013.

==== Subordinations ====
The regiment is subordinated to the 9th Marine Infantry Brigade, a part of the terrestrial forces.

== Organization ==
The regiment's structure is as follows:

  - 1^{re} compagnie de combat - 1st Infantry Company
  - 2^{e} compagnie de combat - 2nd Infantry Company
  - 3^{e} compagnie de combat - 3rd Infantry Company
  - 4^{e} compagnie de combat - 4th Infantry Company
  - 5^{e} compagnie de combat - 5th Infantry Company
  - 6^{e} compagnie de réserve - 6th Reserve Infantry Company
  - 12^{e} compagnie de réserve - 7th Reserve Infantry Company
  - Compagnie d'éclairage et d'appui - Support Company
  - Compagnie de commandement et de logistique - Command and logistics company

== Traditions ==
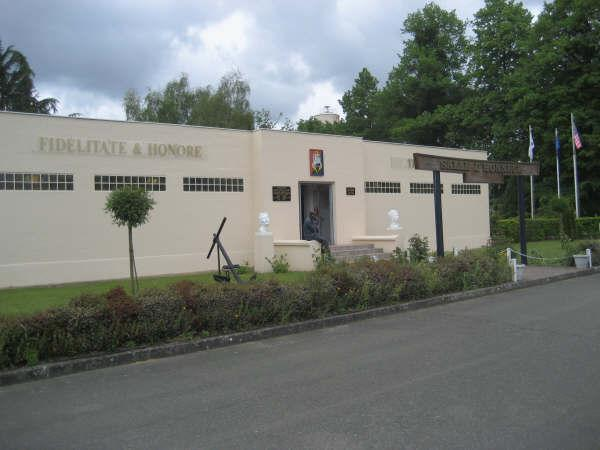
Museum of the 2^{e} RIMa.

The anniversary is celebrated for combats in Bazeilles, the village which was apprehended and abandoned four consecutive times under orders, respectively on August 31 and September 1, 1870.

Et au Nom de Dieu, vive la coloniale!

In the Name of God, vive la coloniale!

The Marsouins and the Bigors have for Saint, God. This war calling concludes intimate ceremonies which part life in the regiments. Often also at origin as an act of grace to Charles de Foucauld.

=== Motto ===
"Fidelitate et honore, terra et mare" translates to "Fidelity and honor on land and sea".

=== Insignia of the 2^{e} RIMa ===
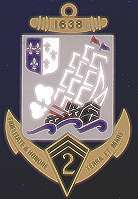
Insignia of the 2^{e} RIMa

« A Frigate firing broadside, featuring the coat of arms of Fleur-de-lis and Ermine. The frigate plaque rests on a golden Marine anchor, featuring « 1638 » dated on the stock. A military inscribed « 2 » surmounted of three chevrons brushing on a diamond on the crown of the anchor. The arm of the anchor is inscribed with "Fidelitate et honore, terra et mare" ».

=== Regimental Colors ===
==== Battle Honours ====
The regimental colors are decorated with:

Regimental Colors of the 2^{e} RIMa.

- Bomarsund 1854
- Puebla 1863
- Bazeilles 1870
- Tuyen-Quan 1885
- la Marne 1914
- Champagne 1915
- la Somme 1916
- L'Aisne - Verdun 1917
- Kub Kub 1941
- El Alamein 1942
- Takrouna 1943
- Ponté Corvo 1944
- Toulon 1944
- Colmar 1945
- Indochine 1947-1954
- AFN 1952-1962

=== Decorations ===
The regiment holds the following decorations:

- Légion d'honneur
- Croix de la libération
- Croix de guerre 1914-1918 with:
  - 4 palms
- Croix de guerre 1939-1945 with:
  - 2 palm
- Croix de guerre des théâtres d'opérations extérieures with :
  - 1 bronze star and 1 palm
- The Regiment was made a Compagnon de la Libération
- croix de la Valeur militaire with:
  - 1 palm

Fourragere:

- The regiment is entitled to wear the fourragere bearing the colors of the Médaille militaire awarded on December 25, 1919, with Croix de guerre 1914-1918 and Croix de guerre 1939-1945, awarded on September 18, 1946.
- The fourragere with colors of the Ordre de la Libération since June 18, 1996.
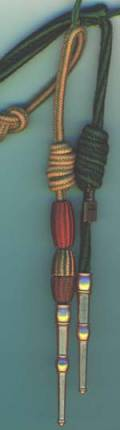
Fourragère with colors of the Médaille militaire and olives 1914-1918, 1939-1945 and the colors of the Ordre de la Libération

== Regimental Commanders ==
=== 2^{e} RIMa (1869 - 1900) ===
- 1869 - 1870: colonel Loubère
- 1870: colonel Alleyron
- ...
- 1885: colonel Frey
- ...

=== 2^{er} RIC (1900 - 1958) ===
- 1910 - 1912: colonel Lorho
- 1912 - 1913: colonel Bertin
- 1913 - 1914: colonel Poirrier
- 1914 - 1914: colonel Gallois
- 1914 - 1914: lieutenant-colonel Dudouis
- 1914 - 1915: lieutenant-colonel Rueff
- 1915 - 1915: lieutenant-colonel Morel
- 1915 - 1916: lieutenant-colonel Monhoven
- 1916 - 1917: colonel Mayer
- 1917 - 1919: colonel Philippe
- 1919 - 1920: colonel Mechet
- 1923 - 1926: colonel Paulet
- 1926 - 1929: colonel Lemoigne
- 1929 - 1931: colonel Lovizit
- 1931 - 1933: colonel Wendt
- 1933 - 1935: colonel Scheidaner
- 1935 - 1936: colonel Sarrade
- 1936 - 1938: colonel Gosse
- 1938 - 1939: colonel Fonferrier
- 1939 - 1940: lieutenant-colonel de Negraval
- 1940 - 1942: lieutenant-colonel Thoma
- 1941 - 1941: lieutenant-colonel Genin
- 1941 - 1941: général Cazaud
- 1942 - 1943: colonel Alessandri
- 1943 - 1943: colonel Brosset
- 1943 - 1944: lieutenant-colonel Garbay
- 1944 - 1944: lieutenant-colonel Gardet
- 1944 - 1944: lieutenant-colonel Bavière
- 1945 - 1947: colonel Gardet
- 1955 - 1956: colonel Moreau
- 1956 - 1957: colonel Copi
- 1957 - 1958: lieutenant-colonel Robraz

=== 2^{er} RIMa ( 1958 - present) ===
- 1958 - 1960: colonel Cadoux
- 1960 - 1962: lieutenant-colonel Charrier
- 1962 - 1963: colonel Pechberty
- 1963 - 1965: colonel Lagarde
- 1965 - 1967: colonel Liegeon
- 1967 - 1969: colonel Duvauchelle
- 1969 - 1971: colonel Delayen
- 1971 - 1972: colonel Georges Fricaud-Chagnaud
- 1972 - 1974: colonel de Heaulme de Boutsocq
- 1974 - 1976: colonel Bataille
- 1976 - 1978: colonel Leromain
- 1978 - 1980: colonel Pacaud
- 1980 - 1982: colonel Suzini
- 1982 - 1984: colonel Fevai
- 1984 - 1986: colonel Lepichon
- 1986 - 1988: colonel Petit
- 1988 - 1990: colonel Loreyte
- 1990 - 1992: colonel Meille
- 1992 - 1994: colonel Rousseau
- 1994 - 1996: colonel Thonier
- 1996 - 1998: colonel Roisin
- 1998 - 2000: colonel Renaud
- 2000 - 2002: colonel Richard
- 2002 - 2004: colonel L'Hôte
- 2004 - 2006: colonel Bordachar
- 2006 - 2008: colonel Launois
- 2008 - 2010: colonel Colcombet
- 2010 - 2012: colonel Heluin
- 2012 - 2014: colonel Paczka
- 2014 - : colonel Georgin
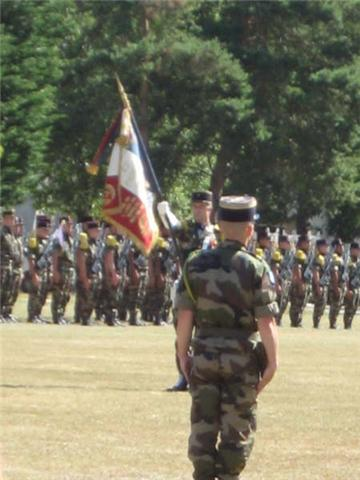
Colonel Launois in front of the regimental colors of the 2^{e} RIMa.

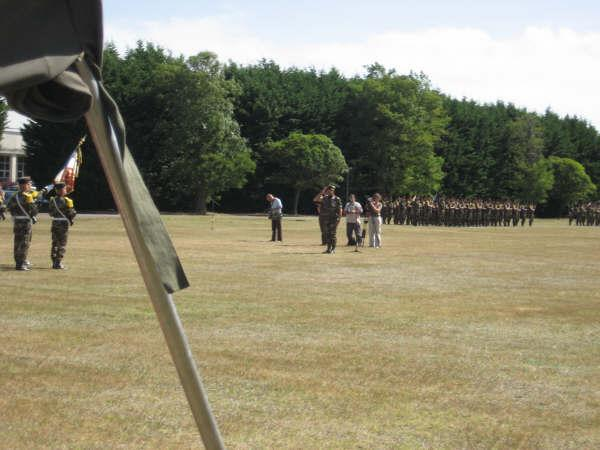
Colonel Colcombet of the 2^{e} RIMa.

== Gallery - 2^{e} RIMa ==
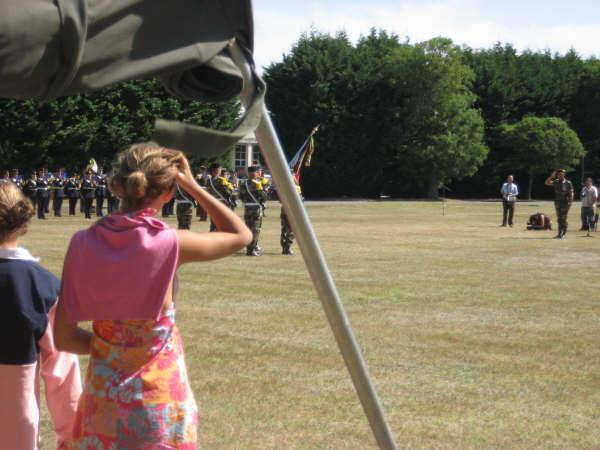
Color Guard of the Regimental Colors for the passation of commandement of the 2^{e} RIMa on July.

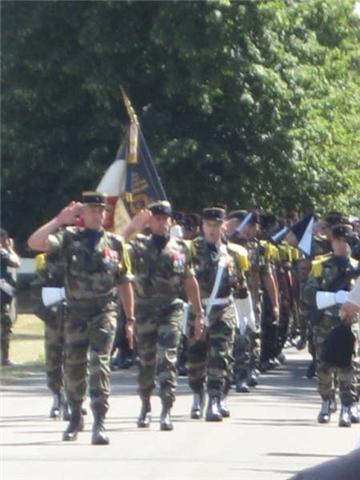
Parading of the Marine companies of the 2^{e} RIMa for the passation of commandement.

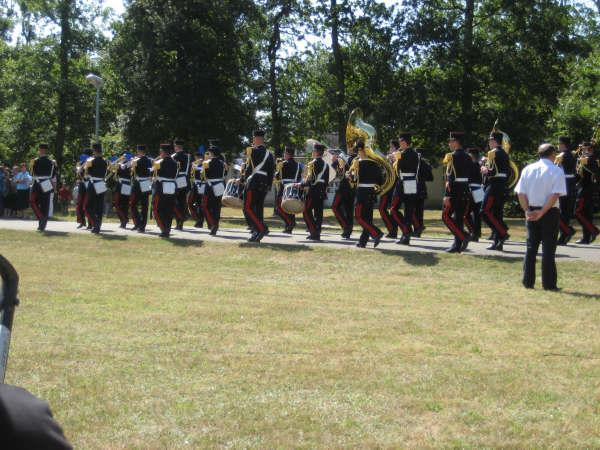
Musical band of the troupes de Marine.

== Notable Officers & Marines ==
- Joseph Gallieni, lieutenant in 1873 (Marshal of France in 1921).
- Joseph Aymerich, as lieutenant and captain in 1887-1888.
- Jean-Louis Delayen, regimental commander (1969-1971).
