= 1st Marine Infantry Regiment =

Coordinates: 45°38′39″N 0°10′31″E

- 1^{er} régiment d'infanterie de marine (French)
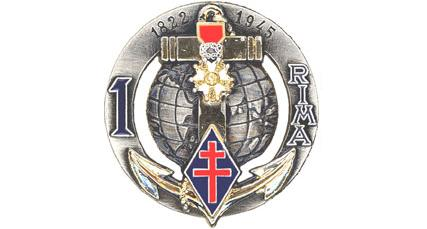
- Active: 1822 – present
- Country: France
- Branch: Marine Troops; French Army
- Type: Regiment
- Role: Light armoured cavalry Amphibious warfare Reconnaissance
- Size: ~1,000
- Part of: 9th Marine Infantry Brigade; 1st Division
- Garrison/HQ: Angoulême, France
- Mottos: Ils ne savent où le destin les mène, seule la mort les arrête (Fr)
- Colors: Red and blue
- Anniversaries: Bazeilles
- Battle honours: Bomarsund 1854; Forts du Pei-Ho 1860; Ki-Hoa 1861; Puebla 1863; Bazeilles 1870; Sontay 1883; La Marne 1914; Champagne 1915; Dobropolje 1918; Tobrouk 1941; Bir-Hakeim 1942; Garigliano 1944; Belfort 1944; Authion 1945; AFN 1952–1962

Commanders
- Notable commanders: Louis Brière de l'Isle

Insignia
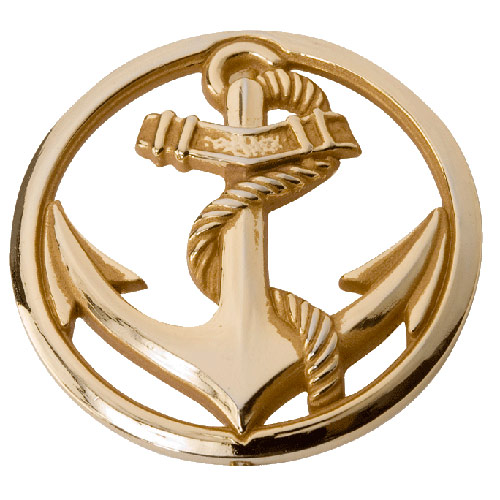
- Beret badge of the Troupes de Marine
- Abbreviation: 1^{er} RIMa

The 1st Marine Infantry Regiment (French: 1^{er} régiment d'infanterie de marine, 1^{er} RIMa) is a French regiment heir of the colonial infantry. The regiment is one of the quatre vieux regiments of the Troupes de Marine, with the 2nd Marine Infantry Regiment 2^{e} RIMa, the 3rd Marine Infantry Regiment 3^{e} RIMa, as well the 4th Marine Infantry Regiment 4^{e} RIMa (dissolved in 1998). Along with the 1st Marine Artillery Regiment 1^{er} RAMa and the 2nd Marine Artillery Regiment 2^{e} RAMa, the 1st Marine formed the Blue Division. The 1^{er} RIMa is a light armoured unit, since 1986, alike with the Régiment d'infanterie-chars de marine RICM.

== Creation and different names ==
Heir to the Compagnie Ordinaire de la Mer created in 1622 by Richelieu, the regiment was created by a Royal Decree in 1822 at the corps of the French Naval Ministry (French: Ministère de la Marine). It was part of the Quatre Grands of the marine infantry which garrisoned the military ports ready to embark: the Grand Un, le Grand Deux, the Grand Trois and the Grand Quatre.

Designated as the 1st Colonial Infantry Regiment (1^{er} RIC) in 1900 when the colonial infantry was created as part of the Ministry of War (French: Ministère de la guerre), the regiment was redesignated as a régiment d'infanterie de marine in 1958, when the colonial infantry was redesignated as marine infantry.

The evolution of the unit's name:

- 1822–1827: 1st Marine Infantry Regiment (French: 1^{er} régiment d'infanterie de la Marine)
- 1854: 1st Marine Infantry Regiment, 2nd formation
- 1870: 1st Marching Marine Infantry Regiment
- 1900–1940: Designated as the 1st Colonial Infantry Regiment 1^{er} RIC at the creation of colonial infantry at the corps of the Ministry of War.
- 1941–1945: 4th Demi-Brigade DFL
- 1945–1947: 1st Colonial Infantry Regiment
- 1947–1948: 1st Colonial Infantry Battalion
- 1948: 1st Colonial Infantry Regiment
- 1958: redesignated as RIMa, when the colonial infantry rebecame marine infantry.

The regiment is heir to the 1st Free French Division and the battalion of the Pacific which combat engaged at Bir Hakeim. The Marine Infantry and Pacific Battalion (French: bataillon d'infanterie de marine et du Pacifique) was issued from the merger, in July 1942, of the 1st Marine Infantry Battalion (French: 1^{er} Bataillon d'Infanterie de Marine) and the Pacific Battalion (French: Bataillon du Pacifique).

== History ==
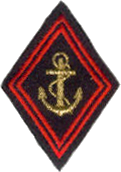
left arm insignia, with anchor of the marine infantry.

=== Wars of the Revolution & Empire ===
- 1813: German Campaign of 1813
  - October 16–19: Battle of Leipzig
- 1814: Campaign of France
  - February 14, 1814: Battle of Vauchamps

=== 1815 to 1848 ===
In 1846, elements of the 1^{er} RIMa were at Tahiti. The regiment was present in the battle of Fatahua (inscribed on the regimental colors of the 2^{e} RIMa) of December 17, 1846 (3rd Company, Captain Masset).

=== Second Empire ===
Crimean War, Franco-British campaign in the Baltic Sea

- 1854 – Battle of Bomarsund

Second Opium War, Franco-British campaign

- 1860 – Forts du Pei-Ho

Cochinchina Campaign

- 1861 -Ki-Hao

French intervention in Mexico

- 1863 – Puebla

War of 1870–1871

On August 17, 1870, the 1st Marching Marine Infantry Regiment was part of the Armée de Châlons (1870) (French: Armée de Châlons (1870)) of Marshal de MacMahon.

- With the 4th Marching Marine Infantry Regiment of colonel d'Arbaud, the 1^{er} formed the first brigade under the orders of général Reboul. This 1^{re} brigade, with the 2^{e} brigade of général Martin des Pallières, three batteries of canons de 4, and one engineer company, constituted the 3rd Infantry Division commanded by division général Élie de Vassoigne. This infantry division evolved at the corps of 12th Army Corps with commander-in-chief Lebrun.
- August 23 to August 26 – March towards the east
- August 31, 1870 – Battle of Bazeilles

=== 1870 to 1914 ===
During the Paris Commune in 1871, the regiment participated with the Armée Versaillaise.

- 1878: Saint-Louis, Senegal
- 1883: Tonkin Expedition
  - Sơn Tây Campaign

=== World War I ===
==== Attachments ====
August 1914 – February 1916
3rd Colonial Infantry Division 3^{e} DIC

In 1914, at the eve of the great war: the 2^{e}, 3^{e}, 7^{e} and 1^{er} RIC, were part of the 1st brigade under the orders of général Montignault, the 3rd colonial infantry division under the orders of général Raffanel.

The 3^{e} DIC: Generals Raffanel, Leblond, Goulet (1914), Gadel (1915), Puypéroux (1916–1918). Engaged in the same sectors as the 2nd Colonial Infantry Division 2^{e} DIC (4^{e}, 8^{e}, 24^{e} R.I.C), to the first battle of Champagne (Ville-sur-Tourbe) and the second battle of Champaign (Ville-sur-Tourbe and Massiges).

February 1916 – November 1918
17th Colonial Infantry Division (France), 17^{e} D.I.C

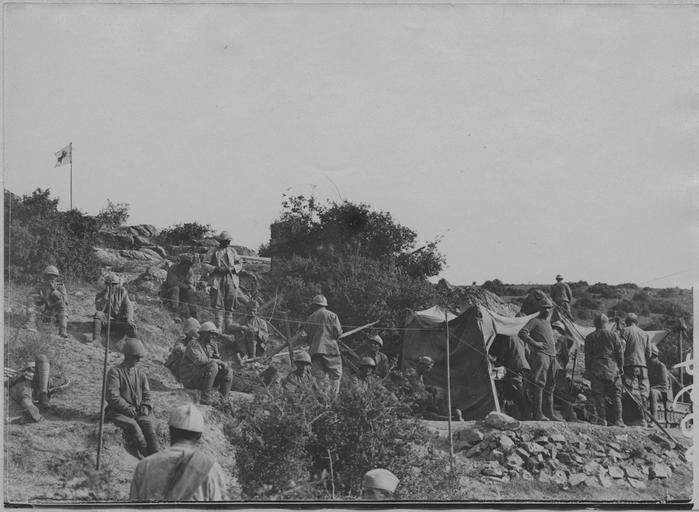
Regimental Aid Post of the 1st Colonial Infantry Regiment at Akritas in Central Macedonia in August 1916.

==== 1914 ====
- August 22: Battle of Rossignol
- August 24: Saint-Vincent
- September 6–7: Battle of the Marne: Écriennes, Vauclerc

==== 1915 ====
- July to August 1915: Operations in Argonne
- September 25 – October 6: Second Battle of Champagne, Souin, September 28 Somme-Py

==== 1916 ====
- Macedonian front
  - Disembarkation at Salonika in February 1916
  - With the 17^{e} D.I.C., Battle of Monastir

==== 1917 ====
- April to May: Battle of the Crna Bend (1917)

==== 1918 ====
- 1918: Sokol, Battle of Dobro Pole, Kravitza
- September 15–18: Vetrenik
- September 23–24: Gradsko

=== World War II ===
==== Mobilization of coloniales troupes in 1939–1940 ====
On May 10, 1940, the 1st Colonial Infantry Regiment was under the command of colonel Fauchon and part of the 3rd Colonial Infantry Division which reinforced the sector of Montmédy.

The 3rd Colonial Division, général Falvy, consisted of the 1st, 21^{e}, 23^{e} R.I.C and 3^{e} and 203^{e} R.A.C. The 3rd Colonial Division disappeared. The division immediately engaged the theatre, in the sector of Sun-sur-Meuse, Stenay, Martincourt, Aviot, Breux north of Verdun, at the level of cote 304 and Mort Homme, lieu of harsh combats in 1916–1917, where combats concentrated. On June 14, the 1^{er} and 23^{e} RIC were engaged in the ravine which separated cote 304 from Mort Homme. At 0630, the cote was crowned, despite a relentless resistance, the armoured contingents crossed the bridge of Bethoncout in direction of Esnes. The bridge was blown-up in the evening and redressed in the same night. The 1st company of the 1^{er} RIC of captain Bertrand counter-attacked. At 17 hours, attacks were ceased. At 19 hours, the French Marines (French: Marsouis) gave their part to other engagements.

=== Combats of free France ===
The regiment was made compagnon de la Libération, June 28, 1945.

=== 1945 to present ===
The regiment was found in A.F.N from 1952 to 1962. Garrisoned in several places, the regiment was part of the 9th Brigade, then 9^{e} DIMa, then 9^{e} BLBMa.

The regiment was deployed to Lebanon at the corps of the Multinational Force in Lebanon in 1983, then United Nations Interim Force in Lebanon UNIFIL in 1984.

In 1986 the regiment transitioned to the armored role.

In July 2009, the regiment joined the 3rd Mechanised Brigade which became designated in March 2014 as 3rd Light Armoured Brigade.

The regiment has participated in all major operations of the French Army (Lebanon, Bosnia, Kosovo, Chad, Côte d'Ivoire, Central African Republic, Afghanistan). In 2010 members of the regiment were deployed in Guadeloupe and Djibouti or in operations in Kosovo and Afghanistan.

== Organisation ==
- Structure
  - Escadron de commandement et de logistique - Command and Logistics squadron
  - 1er Escadron - 1st Armored Squadron
  - 2e Escadron - 2nd Armored Squadron
  - 3e Escadron - 3rd Armored Squadron
  - 4e Escadron - 4th Reconnaissance and Response Squadron
  - 5e Escadron - 5th Reserve Armored Squadron
  - 6e Escadron - 6th Reconnaissance and Response Squadron

== Traditions ==
The anniversary is celebrated for combats in Bazeilles, the village which was apprehended and abandoned four consecutive times under orders, respectively on August 31 and September 1, 1870.

Et au Nom de Dieu, vive la coloniale !

In the Name of God, vive la coloniale !

The Marsouins and the Bigors recognize God as their patron saint. This wartime tradition includes ceremonies that are part of regimental life, often originating as an act of grace related to Charles de Foucauld.

=== Insignia of the 1^{er} RIMa ===
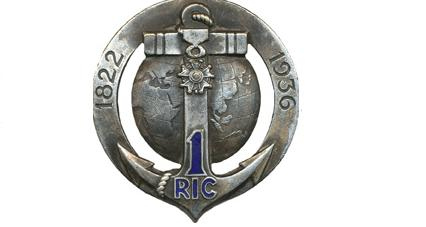
Insignia of the 1st Colonial Infantry Regiment, 1^{er} RIC.

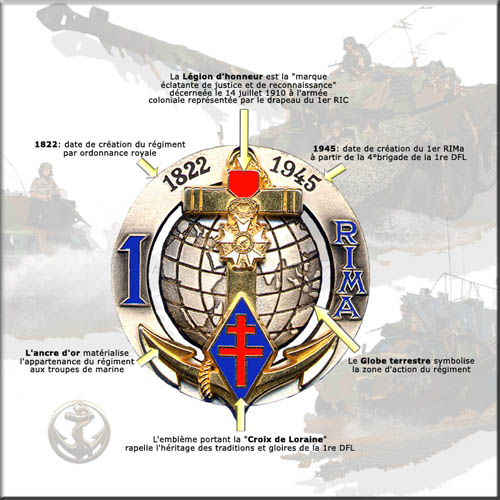
Description of the insignia.

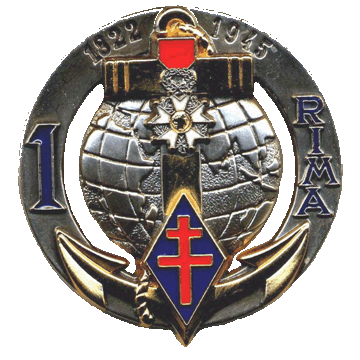
Insignia of the 1st Marine Infantry Regiment, 1^{er} RIMa.

=== Regimental Colors ===
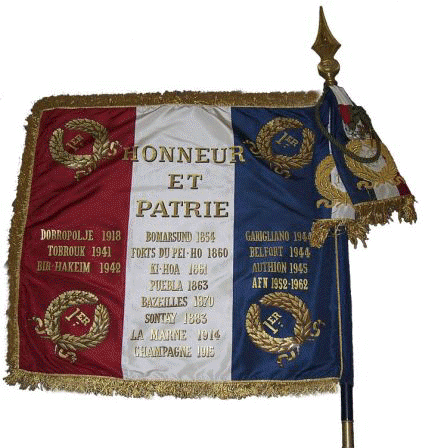

=== Decorations ===
The regimental colors are decorated with:

- Légion d'honneur
- Croix de Guerre 1914–1918 with:
  - 2 palms
- Croix de Guerre 1939–1945 with:
  - 1 palm
- croix de la Valeur militaire with:
  - 1 silver star with 1 palm

Fourragère:

- The regiment is entitled to wear the fourragère bearing the colors of the croix de guerre 1914–1918.

=== Honours ===
==== Battle Honours ====
- Bomarsund 1854
- Forts du Pei-Ho 1860
- Ki-Hoa 1861
- Puebla 1863
- Bazeilles 1870
- Sontay 1883
- La Marne 1914
- Champagne 1915
- Dobropolje 1918
- Tobrouk 1941
- Bir-Hakeim 1942
- Garigliano 1944
- Belfort 1944
- Authion 1945
- Afn 1952–1962

== Regimental Commanders ==
=== 1^{er} RIMa (1822–1900) ===
- 1854: Colonel de Vassoigne.
- ...
- 1870: Colonel Brière de l'Isle.
- ...
- 01/10/1884–1885: Général Duchemin.
- ...
- 1893: Colonel Boilève.

=== 1^{er} RIC (1900–1958) ===
- 1903: colonel Lalubin
- 23/09/1913 – 12/09/1914: Général Guérin

=== 1^{er} RIMa (1958 – present) ===
- 1959–1960: lieutenant-colonel Thomas
- 1960–1961: colonel Bertin
- 1961–1962: lieutenant-colonel Brin
- 1962–1963: colonel Amosse
- 1963–1965: colonel Pol
- 1965–1967: colonel Picard
- 1967–1969: colonel Cazes
- 1969–1971: colonel Lavenu
- 1971–1973: colonel Lebert
- 1973–1975: colonel Chavannes
- 1975–1977: colonel Philipot
- 1977–1979: colonel Carpentier
- 1979–1981: colonel Dumontet
- 1981–1983: colonel Pintoux
- 1983–1985: colonel Dufour
- 1985–1987: colonel Rousseau
- 1987–1989: colonel Paillard
- 1989–1991: colonel Chassagne
- 1991–1993: lieutenant-colonel Nielly
- 1993–1995: colonel Canicio
- 1995–1997: colonel Koessler
- 1997–1999: colonel Philippe Renard
- 1999–2001: colonel Gras
- 2001–2003: colonel Fesquet
- 2003–2005: colonel Morel
- 2005–2007: colonel Pelletier
- 2007–2009: colonel Langard
- 2009–2011: colonel Barrera
- 2011–2013: colonel Gougeon
- 2013–2015: colonel Caille
- 2015-2017: colonel Girard
- 2017-2019: colonel Soubrier
- 2019-2021: colonel Thomas
- 2021-2023: colonel Le Gouvello de la Porte
- 2023-2025: colonel Bignon
- 2025- : colonel Caussin

== Notable Officers & Marines ==
- Joseph Gaudérique Aymerich, captain in the 1^{er} RIMa in 1889.
