= 4th Marine Infantry Regiment =

- 4^{e} Régiment d'Infanterie Marine
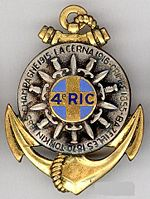
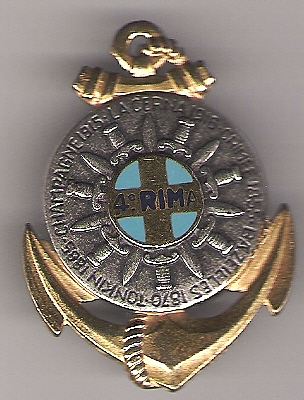
- Regimental insignia of the 4^{e} RIC; Regimental insignia of the 4^{e} RIMa
- Active: August 31, 1854, to June 30, 1998
- Country: France
- Branch: French Army
- Type: troupes de marine
- Role: Infantry
- Garrison/HQ: Toulon et Fréjus
- Motto(s): « J'y suis j'y reste »(Fr); Here I be, here I stay (Eng)
- Colors: Red and blue
- Anniversaries: Bazeilles
- Engagements: Crimean War; Second Franco-Traza War; Cochinchina Campaign; Tonkin Campaign; Franco-Prussian War; World War I World War II; Algerian War
- Battle honours: Sébastopol 1854-55; Saïgon 1859; Bazeilles 1870; Tuyen-Quan 1885; Maroc 1907-1913; la Marne 1914; Champagne 1915; la Cerna 1916; AFN 1952-1962

The 4th Marine Infantry Regiment (French: 4^{e} Régiment d'Infanterie de Marine, 4^{e} RIMa) was a French marine regiment of the troupes de marine within the French Army. This regiment was part of the « Quatre Grands » of the Marine Infantry along with the 1st Marine Infantry Regiment 1^{er} RIMa, the 2nd Marine Infantry Regiment 2^{e} RIMa, the 3rd Marine Infantry Regiment 3^{e} RIMa, however was dissolved in 1998. Along with the 1st Marine Artillery Regiment 1^{er} RAMa and 2nd Marine Artillery Regiment 2^{e} RAMa, the 4th Marine formed of the two brigades of the Blue Division. On June 14, 2001, the GSMA of Mayotte, heir to the 4th Marine Infantry Regiment, received the color guard of the regimental colors.

== Creating and different nominations ==
- The origin of this regiment is the "Royal Marine" (French: Royal Marine) founded by the Sun King Louis XIV in 1669.
- The 4th Marine Infantry Regiment was created from elements of the regiment of Brest.
- The 4th Marine Infantry Regiment of August 31, 1854, until December 31, 1900, traditional garrison of Tolulon.
- In 1857 : the 4th Marine Infantry Regiment had 22 companies in Toulon, 5 in the Reunion, 5 in the Senegal, and 2 in Gorée.
- In 1870 : 4th Marching Marine Infantry Regiment.
- On January 1, 1901 : became the 4th Colonial Infantry Regiment 4^{e} RIC.
- In 1914 : the regiment was part of the 2nd Colonial Division 2^{e} DC under orders of général Leblois. At the end of the war, the regiment was part of the 16^{e} DIC.
- 4th Colonial Infantry Regiment 4^{e} RIC until April 30, 1923.
- On May 1, 1923 : became 4th Colonial Tirailleurs Regiment 4^{e} RTC by designation change.
- 4th Colonial Infantry Regiment on October 15, 1939.
- Recreated at Toulon for the campaign.
- July 1940. The regiment was part of the 2nd Colonial Division, général Maignan: 4^{e} RIC with various constituents.
- May 1, 1947, to 31 March 1949: 4th Colonial Infantry Battalion 4^{e} BIC.
- May 1, 1949 : 4th Colonial Infantry Regiment 4^{e} RIC.
- November 30, 1958: regiment at Toulon.
- December 1, 1958, to January 31, 1959 : 4th Marine Infantry Regiment 4^{e} RIMa.
- February 1, 1959 : 1st battalion of the 4th Marine Infantry Regiment.
- At the cease-fire on March 19, 1962, in Algeria, the I/4^{e} RIMa created among 91 other regiments, part of the 114 local forces. The I/4^{e} RIMa was a local force of the Algerian order of battle, 420°UFL-UFO at Canrobert, composed of 10% metropolitan military and 90% of Muslim military, and which during the transition period were at the service of the executive provisional Algerian authority, until the independence of Algeria (Evian accords of March 18, 1962).
- At Toulon on June 15, 1962.

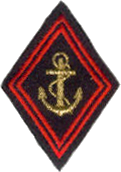
left arm insignia, with anchor of the marine infantry.

- June 16, 1962 : center of instruction of the 4th Marine Infantry Regiment
- June 30, 1972 : at Toulon.
- July 1, 1977 : 4th Marine Infantry Regiment 4^{e} RIMa.
- July 14, 1977 : The regiment left the garrison at Toulon to join Fréjus.
- During garrison at Toulon, the regiment consisted of the Corniche Bournazel preparatory class to the Ecole Spéciale Militaire de Saint Cyr.
- The regiment was separated in two in 1980, one-half of the regiment joined Perpignan where they incorporated the forming effectifs of the 24th Marine Infantry Regiment 24^{e} RIMa dissolved. The other half of the regiment was founded at the corps of the GITDM at Fréjus which became the depository of the regimental colors of the 4th Marine Infantry Regiment 4^{e} RIMa.
- On July 1, 1986 : the regiment at Perpignan and marines joined Fréjus while the 24th Marine Infantry Regiment reconstituted formation in the original respective garrison of the 24^{e} RIMa.
- On June 30, 1998 : the regiment was dissolved after 144 years of presence.
- On June 14, 2001 : the color guard of the regimental colors was entrusted to GSMA of Mayotte and that of the 6th Senegalese Tirailleurs Regiment 6^{e} RTS, whose color guard regimental colors were entrusted and transferred to the 21st Marine Infantry Regiment 21^{e} RIMa.

== History ==
=== Wars of the Revolution & Empire ===
- 1813 : German Campaign of 1813
  - October 16–19 : Battle of Leipzig
- 1814 : Campaign of France
  - February 14, 1918 : Battle of Vauchamps

=== Second Empire ===
- 1854 : 4th Marine Infantry Regiment, stationed at Toulon
- 1869 : the regiment was spread between Toulon, Cochinchinem Guyana, and Japan.

The 4th Marine Infantry Regiment illustrated capability first in Crimea (1854–1855) participating to the Siege of Sebastopol. Following this campaign, the Emperor decided that the regimental colors of the 4th Marine Infantry Regiment would bear the golden inscriptions letters of « Sébastopol ». In 1859, the Regiment took part in the Second Italian War of Independence against the Austrian Empire.

Starting in 1855, and for the next fifteen years, 4 out of the Regiment's 34 companies were stationed in Senegal. Under the leadership of the French governor Louis Faidherbe, they took part in various wars against local Kingdoms and Empires. From 1855 to 1858, the companies were involved in the Second Franco-Traza War, notably at the Battle of Dioubouldou and the Battle of Leybar Bridge. From 1855 to 1860, they had various encounters with the forces of Oumar Tall's Toucouleur Jihad in the Futa Tooro, the most notable one being the Siege of Fort Médine. Between 1861 and 1870 they took part in the conquest of Cayor against the Damel Lat Jor, notably at the Battle of Loro in 1864 and the Battle of Louga in 1869. In April 1870, the 4th was replaced in Senegal by the 1st Marine Infantry Regiment.

The Regiment was involved in China, during the Second Opium War and the Taiping Rebellion. Following, the regiment was called to battle in the Cochinchina Campaign and then in the Tonkin Campaign which valued the regiment with new inscriptions on the regimental colors :
Saigon (1859)-Ki Hoa (1861)-Langson (1884)-Tuyen Quan (1885). Sébastopol 1854–1855 - Saïgon 1859 - Ki Hoa 1861 - Langson 1884 - Tuyen Quan 1885, battles also inscribed on the regimental colors of the 22nd Colonial Infantry Regiment, 22^{e} RIC.

=== 1870 to 1914 ===
On August 17, 1870, the 4th Marching Marine Infantry Regiment was part of the Armée de Châlons (1870) (French: Armée de Châlons (1870)) of Marshal de MacMahon.

- With the 1st Marching Marine Infantry Regiment of colonel Brière de L'Isle, the 4th, formed the 1st brigade at the orders of général Reboul. This first brigade with the second brigade of général Martin des Pallières, three batteries de 4, two batteries de 4 and one mitrailleuses of a marine artillery regiment, one engineer company constituted the 3rd Infantry Division, the Blue Division commanded by division général de Vassoigne. This infantry division evolved at the corps of the 12th Army Corps with commander-in-chief division général Lebrun.

- August 23 to 26 1870 - March towards the east.
- August 31, 1870 - Battle of Bazeilles.

- From 1873 to 1885, the regiment was in Tonkin. Eight companies were at Madagascar, participating to campaigns of île, until the end of 1885.
- March 1, 1890 : by doubling, the 8th Marine Infantry Regiment (French: 8^{e} Régiment d'infanterie de marine) was created.
- In 1900, the regiment was designated as 4th Colonial Infantry Regiment and was regrouped at Toulon. The same year, the regiment integrated a section of colonial sapeur télégraphiste.
- From 1907 to 1913, the regiment partook the campaigns of Morocco.
- In 1914, the regiment was still stationed at Toulon, part of the 4th Colonial Brigade.
- On April 1, 1915, the first contingents of colonial troupes disembark at Fréjus. All troupes from outre-mer were present: African, Malagasy, Indochina. Provisionary camps were rapidly installed for the welcome. These installations constituted quickly a vast ensemble which gathered 45000 men.

Attachments:

- 4th Colonial Brigade and 2nd Colonial Infantry Division 2^{e} D.I.C in August 1914.
- 16th Colonial Infantry Division 16^{e} D.I.C from November 1916 to November 1918.
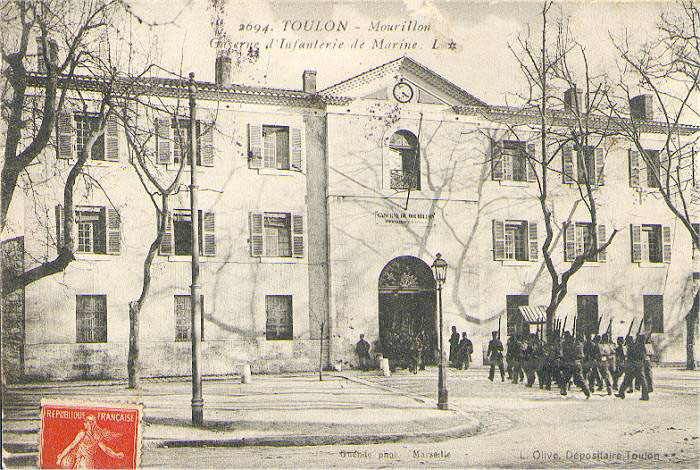
Garrison of the marine infantry at Toulon.

=== World War I ===
==== Division attachment ====
- garrison in 1914 : Toulon 4th Colonial Brigade.
- 2nd Colonial Infantry Division 2^{e} DIC : August 1914 – November 1916
- 16th Colonial Infantry Division 16^{e} DIC : November 1916 – November 1918

==== 1914 ====
- Operations of the IIIrd Army and IVth Army:
- August 22 : Battle of Rossignol
- August 24 : Saint-Vincent
- September 6–7 : Battle of the Marne: Matignicourt-Goncourt, Cote 15
- December 20 : remounting of the offensive in Champagne: north of Beauséjour

==== 1915 ====
- February 3: Champagne: fortin de Main Massiges
- February 23–27: Fortin de Beauséjour
- September 25 : Second Battle of Champagne : Main-de-Massiges

==== 1916 ====
- January 29 – February 2 :Battle of the Somme
- July 1 : Frise
- September 12 – November 19 : Batte of Monastir

==== 1917 ====
French Army of the Orient, AFO:

- May 9: Piton Rocheux and Piton Jaune

==== 1918 ====
- September 18–30: Serbia: Battle of Skra-di-Legen

=== Interwar period ===
The installation have known their full developments after the war. The garrison of Fréjus became a center of formation and perfection as well as a transit center.
On May 1, 1923, the regiment was designated as 4th Colonial Tirailluers Regiment (French: 4e régiment de tirailleurs sénégalais, 4^{e} Régiment de tirailleurs coloniaux, 4^{e} RTC) by change designation.
During the interwar period, the regiment participated to the campaign of the Levant in 1925.

=== World War II ===
The 4th Colonial Infantry Regiment 4^{e} RIC recreated at Toulon for the campaign of October 15, 1939.
The 4^{e} RIC with various elements was integrated in the 2nd Colonial Division, under the orders of général Maignan. The regiment was engaged on the Rhin then in Aisne at the beginning of the second world conflict. Dissolved on July 14, 1940.
On March 1, 1943, the « 4 » was reconstituted in Senegal at the corps of the 9th Colonial Infantry Division 9^{e} DIC.
The regiment participated to the conquest of île Elbe, on June 17, 1944
Two months later, it was the disembarking in provence at Saint-Tropez, Saint-Raphaël and then Toulon. The regiment was of all combats of the Liberation until October 31, 1944.
With second world war, Fréjus maintained. The camps were brought back to their initial missions since 1945, taking the role of training and transit centers. Arbitrating the center of organization of the French far east expeditionary corps. Then the precolonial center of instruction, before rejoining Indochina, Madagascar and later North Africa.

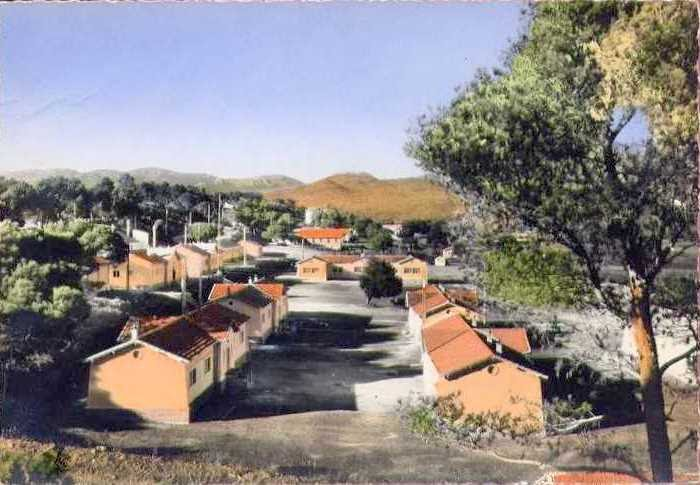
Camp Robert in 1964.

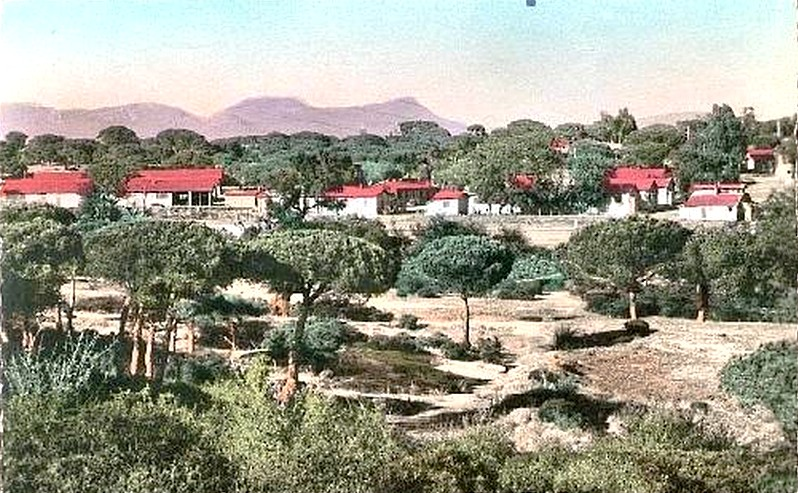
Another view of camp Robert in 1964.

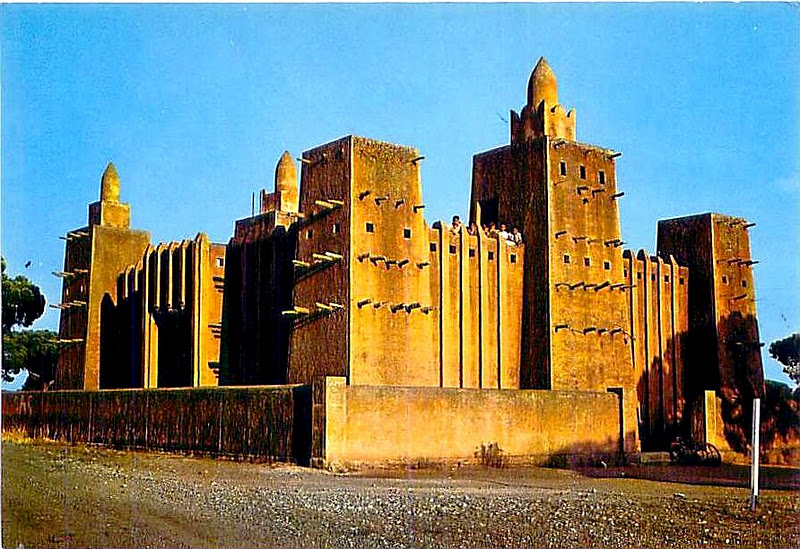
Mosque in front of camp Robert at Fréjus in 1964.

=== Post World War II ===
- The regiment was dissolved in February 1946.
- The regiment was recreated on April 1, 1949, at Toulon. The regiment partook to the operations of North Africa, Suez in 1956 then Algeria.

=== Algerian War ===
After 1960, the garrison lost the African detachments, which the last left Puget in September 1964. The camps of south-east were composed of almost 12000 men, then four hospitals, cemeteries were created (annamite cemetery, African cemetery of Baume). Accordingly, the military domain was restrained, camps were left over (camp Galliéni, camp Robert, Camp Caïs). These lands in 2011 are today occupied by a sporting complex and by the Memorial of Indochinese Wars (French: Mémorial des guerres en Indochine).

At the cease-fire on March 19, 1962, in Algeria, the I/4^{e} RIMa created among 91 other regiments, part of the 114 local forces. The I/4^{e} RIMa was a local force of the Algerian order of battle, 420°UFL-UFO at Canrobert, composed of 10% metropolitan military and 90% of Muslim military, and which during the transition period were at the service of the executive provisional Algerian authority, until the independence of Algeria (Evian accords of March 18, 1962).

- The regiment would be at Toulon until 1979.
- In 1979, the regiment garrisoned at Fréjus (camp le Coq), in 1978, the regiment was part of the 5th military region, 53rd territorial military division.
- Then in 1980, the regiment would be at Perpignan.
- In 1985, the regiment as a whole would come back to Fréjus.
- On June 30, 1998, the regiment was dissolved.
- The 21st Marine Infantry Regiment

(* Initially referred to as camp de la Lègue, baptized following the Second World War after an officer killed fighting for France in Indochina on Mars 1945. Having served in Soudan and Mauritania, colonel Le Coq was referred as the Grand Méhariste and Compagnon de la Libération.)

  - Filiation of GITDM : (French: Groupement d'instruction des troupes de marine).
- In 1954, the Extrême-Orient center of organization of the French Expeditionary Corps (CEFEO), by designation change of the instruction groups of troupes coloniales in metropole (GTIC Métro).
- In 1958, by designation change of the instruction groupment and transit of troupes in outer-mer (G.I.T.T.O.M.)
- In 1961, by designation change of the instruction groupment and transit of troupes de marine (G.I.T.T.D.M.)
- In 1965, by designation change of the instruction group of troupes de marine (G.I.M.T), dissolved in 1970.
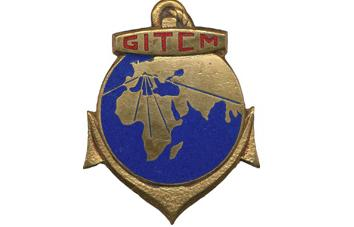
Insignia of the instruction groupment of troupes coloniales in metropole (G.I.T.C.Métro).

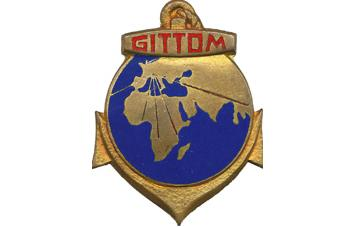
Insignia of instruction groupment and transit of troupes in outer-mer (G.I.T.T.O.M.).

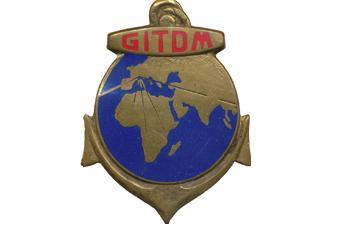
Insignia of instruction group of troupes de marine (G.I.M.T).

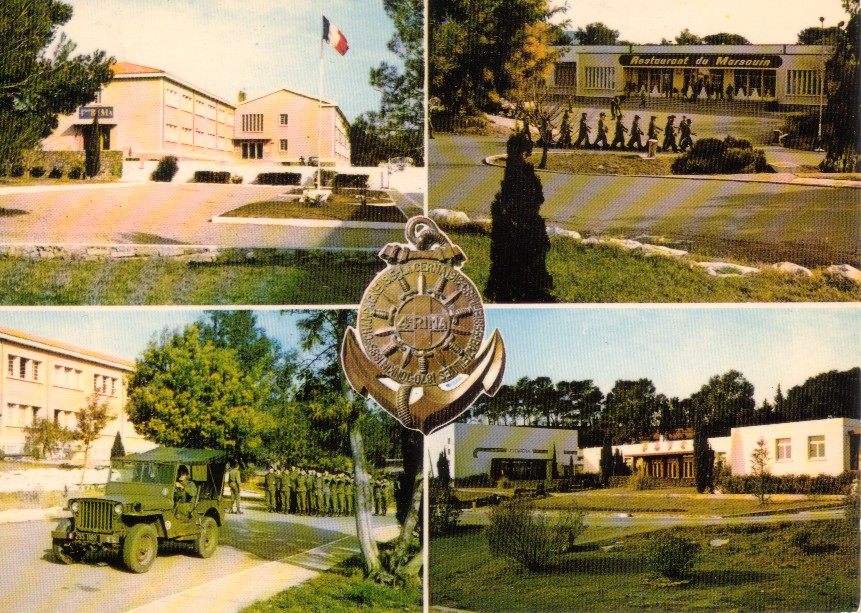
Garrison Lecoq of the 4^{e} RIMa.
- On June 14, 2001, the adapted military service groupment of Mayotte GSMA, inherited the patrimony of the 4^{e} RIMa and received the color guard of the regimental colors.
- The detachment of the SMA in Mayotte was created on January 1, 1988.

== Traditions ==
The anniversary is celebrated for combats in Bazeilles, the village which was apprehended and abandoned four consecutive times under orders, respectively on August 31 and September 1, 1870.

Et au Nom de Dieu, vive la coloniale !

In the Name of God, vive la coloniale !

The Marsouins and the Bigors have for Saint, God. This war calling concludes intimate ceremonies which part life in the regiments. Often also at origin as an act of grace to Charles de Foucauld.

=== Decorations ===
The regimental colors of the 4th Marine Infantry Regiment 4^{e} RIMa is decorated with:

- Croix de guerre 1914-1918 with:
  - 2 palms

Fourragere:

- with colors of the croix de guerre 1914-1918 awarded October 1919.

=== Honours ===
==== Battle Honours ====
- Sébastopol 1854–55
- Saïgon 1859
- Bazeilles 1870
- Tuyen-Quan 1885
- Maroc 1907–1913
- la Marne 1914
- Champagne 1915
- la Cerna 1916
- AFN 1952–1962

== Regimental Commanders ==
- 1854 : Colonel du Château
- 1855 : Colonel de Cendrecourt
- 1855 : Colonel Reybaud
- 1856 : Colonel Brunet
- 1859 : Colonel Cappe
- 1864 : Colonel Reboul
- 1867 : Colonel d'Arbaud
- 1877 : Colonel de Maission
- 1879 : Colonel Bégin
- 1881 : Colonel Biriet
- 1882 : Colonel Laurent
- 1883 : Colonel Bourchet
- 1884 : Colonel Ligier
- 1886 : Colonel Voyron
- 1888 : Colonel Dodds
- 1889 : Colonel Pernot
- 1890 : Colonel Badens
- ...
- 1900 : colonel Vimard (1850-1934)
- 1902 : colonel Lalubin
- July 12, 1914 – August 6, 1914 : général Gadel
- ...
- 1956–1958 : colonel Grimaldi
- 1958–1961 : chef de bataillon Hogard
- 1961–1963 : lieutenant-colonel Braquet then lieutenant-colonel Cames (Toulon)
- 1963–1964 : colonel Le Flahec
- 1964–1965 : colonel Gérard
- 1965–1967 : colonel Jeanblanc
- 1967–1969 : colonel Descheyne
- 1969–1971 : colonel Robecat (Toulon).
- 1971–1973 : colonel Marion (Toulon).
- 1973–1975 : lieutenant-colonel De Buyer (Toulon).
- 1975–1977 : ...
- 1977–1979 : colonel Paillard (Toulon).
- 1979–1980 : colonel Metayer (Fréjus).
- 1980–1981 : colonel Metayer (Perpignan).
- 1981–1983 : colonel Alain (Perpignan).
- 1983–1985 : colonel Paveau (Perpignan).
- 1985–1987 : colonel Léonardi (Perpignan).
- 1985–1987 : colonel Pirson (Fréjus).
- 1987–1989 : colonel Messaoudi.
- 1989–1991 : colonel Ronde
- 1991–1993 : colonel Trélaün
- 1993–1995 : colonel Moreau
- 1995–1997 : colonel Gilles
- 1997–1998 : colonel Fugier

== Notable Officers & Marines ==
- Joseph Gaudérique Aymerich, chef de bataillon in 1897.

== Sources and bibliography ==
- Erwan Bergot, La coloniale du Rif au Tchad 1925-1980, imprimé en France : décembre 1982, n° d'éditeur 7576, n° d'imprimeur 31129, sur les presses de l'imprimerie Hérissey.
