= Blue Division (disambiguation) =

Blue Division may refer to one of the following:

- Blue Division, a unit of Spanish volunteers that served on the Axis side during World War II, mainly on the Eastern Front
- Blue Division (Second French Empire), the nickname given to the first naval division, formed in 1870, merging the naval artillery and naval infantry
- Irish Brigade (Spanish Civil War), Irish fascist volunteers who fought on the Falangist side in the Spanish Civil War and nicknamed the Blue Division
- 392nd (Croatian) Infantry Division, a volunteer division in Wehrmacht during World War Two recruited from the Independent State of Croatia, nicknamed the Blue Division by its men
