= 3rd Marine Infantry Regiment =

3^{e} Régiment d'Infanterie de Marine
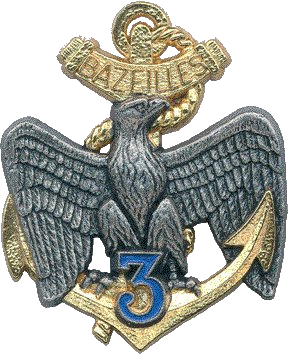
- Regimental insignia of the 3^{e} RIMa
- Active: 1838 - present
- Country: France
- Branch: Marine Troops; French Army
- Type: Regiment
- Role: Infantry; Amphibious warfare Urban warfare Close-quarters combat
- Size: ~ 1,250
- Part of: 9th Marine Infantry Brigade; 1st Division
- Garrison/HQ: Vannes, France
- Nickname: « Le Grand Trois » (Fr)
- Motto: « Debout les morts » (Fr)
- Colors: Red and blue
- Anniversaries: Bazeilles
- Engagements: Franco-Prussian War; World War I World War II; Lebanese Civil War 1975–1990: United Nations Interim Force in Lebanon; Multinational Force 1982–1984; Gulf War; War on terror (2001 – present)
- Battle honours: Magador 1844; Alma 1854; Palikao 1860; Ki-Hoa 1861; Bazeilles 1870; Sontay 1883; La Marne 1914; Champagne 1915; Dobropolje 1918; Koweït 1990–1991

Insignia
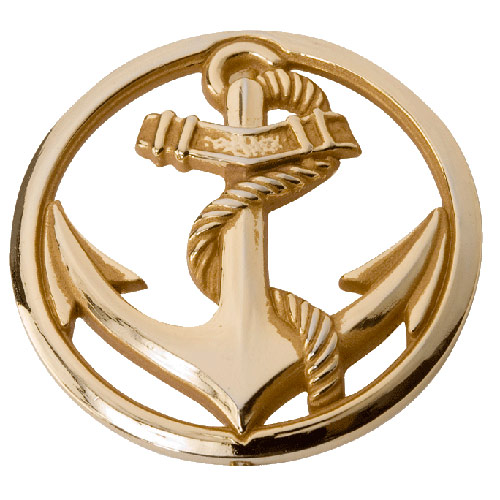
- Beret badge of the Troupes de Marine
- Abbreviation: 3^{e} RIMa

The 3rd Marine Infantry Regiment (French: 3^{e} Régiment d'Infanterie de Marine, 3^{e} RIMa) is a unit of the French Army. The 3^{e} RIMa is one of the oldest of the troupes de marine. This regiment is one of the "Quatre Grands" of marine infantry once garrisoned within the four military ports, ready to embark : the « Grand Un », the « Grand Deux », the « Grand Trois » and the « Grand Quatre ». The regiment fought in the expeditions of the 19th century in Africa, the Americas, Oceania and the Orient. Surnamed also the "3rd Marine", the unit was part of the « Blue Division » which fought at the Battle of Bazeilles on August 31 and September 1, 1870. The regiment is part of the 9th Light Armoured Marine Brigade.

== Creation and different names ==
- 1854 : the 3rd Marine Infantry Regiment was stationed at Rochefort.
- 1869 : the 3rd Marine Infantry Regiment was spread between Rochefort, Cochinchine, Réunion, New Caledonia and Tahiti.
- 1870 : the 3rd Marching Marine Infantry Regiment.
- 1890 : the 3rd Marine Infantry Regiment was doubled and formed the 7th Colonial Infantry Regiment (French: 7^{e} Régiment d'infanterie coloniale, 7^{e} RIC).
- 1900 : the 3rd Marine Infantry Regiment was designated 3rd Colonial Infantry Regiment (French: 3^{e} Régiment d'infanterie coloniale, 3^{e} RIC).
- 1914 : the 3rd Colonial Infantry Regiment was garrisoned at Rochefort. The regiment was part of the 3rd Colonial Brigade; 3rd Colonial Infantry Division 3^{e} DIC.
- 1946 : 3rd Colonial Infantry Battalion 3^{e} BIC.
- 1958 : Instruction Center of the 3^{e} RIC.
- 1958 : Instruction Center of the 3^{e} RIMa.
- 1963 : 3rd Marine Infantry Regiment 3^{e} RIMa.

== History ==
=== Ancien Regime ===
==== Wars of the Revolution & Empire ====
- 1813 : German Campaign of 1813
  - October 16–19 : Battle of Leipzig
- 1814 : Campaign of France
  - February 14, 1814 : Battle of Vauchamps

==== 1815 to 1848 ====
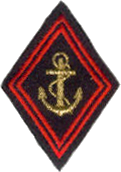
left arm insignia, with anchor of the marine infantry.

The Compagnie Ordinaire de la Mer was created by Cardinal Richelieu in 1622. A Royal Ordinance of King Louis Philippe I, the King of the French reconstituted in 1831 two regiments of marine infantry (French: régiments d'infanterie de marine) from the 45th, the 51st Line Infantry Regiment (French: 51^{e} Régiments d'infanterie de ligne) and 16th Light Infantry Regiment which was garrisoned at the time in the colonies; a new decree ordinance dated November 20, 1838 created a third regiment of arms (French: troisième régiment de l'arme). Each regiment counted 30 active companies, out of which four were grenadier companies, 4 de voltigeurs and 22 du centre, a headquarter staff and a company hors rang. The 3rd Regiment was garrisoned at Toulon, Cayenne, Senegal and the Bourbon island (current Reunion island).

- Accordingly, the origin of the 3e RIMa dates back to 1831. With the actual 2nd Marine Infantry Regiment 2^{e} RIMa, the regiment is the oldest of the "quatre vieux". The regiment garrisoned in Rochefort from 1838 to 1946.
- Campaign in Senegal from 1833 to 1835.
- Plata expedition in 1840.
- Operations of Oceania from 1843 to 1846.
- First expeditions in Morocco in 1844.
- Second Plata expedition in 1850.

=== Second Empire ===
Napoleon III expressed a plentiful of solicitude for the troupes coloniales; a decree of 1854 reorganised the marine infantry by creating four regiments each associated with its home port.

- Crimean War and during the expedition of the Baltic (1854).
- Campaign of China (1855–1860).
- Campaign of Senegal (1863).
- Campaign of Annam, Cochinchine and Cambodia (1858–1868).
- 1869 : dispersed between Rochefort, Cochinchine, the Reunion, New Caledonia and Tahiti.
- For a first time, the 3rd Marine engaged in combat on metropolitan soil. On August 31 and September 1, 1870, engaged at the corps of the Blue Division, the 3^{e} RIMa disappeared at Bazeilles during a combat until the "dernière cartouche".

On August 17, 1870, the 3rd Marching Marine Infantry Regiment was part of the Armée de Châlons (1870) (French: Armée de Châlons (1870)) of Marshal de MacMahon.

- With the 2nd Marching Marine Infantry Regiment of colonel Alleyron, the 3^{e} under the orders of the colonel Lecamus, formed the 2nd Brigade at the orders of général Charles Martin des Pallières. This 2nd Brigade with the 1st Brigade of général Reboul, three batteries de 4, two batteries de 4 and one machine gun battery of the marine artillery regiment, one engineer company, constituted the 3rd Infantry Division commanded by division général De Vassoigne. This infantry division evolved at the corps of the 12th Army Corps, commanded by division general Lebrun.

– August 23 to 26 1870 – March towards the east.
– August 31, 1870 – Battle of Bazeilles.

=== 1870 to 1914 ===
- New Caledonia (1878)
- Indochina (1822–1885)
- Africa (1882–1894)
- Formose (1884)
- Nouvelles-Hébrides (1886)
- Diégo-Suarez (1898)
- Crete (1898)
- China (1900)
- Morocco (1911–1913)

=== World War I ===
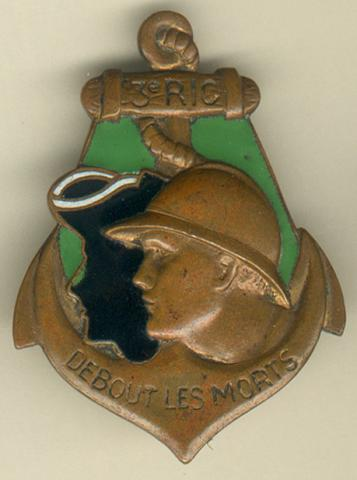
An insignia of the 3rd Marine Infantry Regiment.

==== Division attachment ====
- From August 1914 to February 1916 : 3rd Colonial Infantry Division, 3^{e} DIC
- From February 1916 to November 1918 : 17th Colonial Infantry Division (France), 17^{e} DIC
- The regiment illustrated capability during the war, at the Battle of Rossignol, la Marne, and at Beauséjour prior to being engaged on the Orient front until June 1919.

==== 1914 ====
The regiment operated with the Third and Fourth Armies.

- Battle of the Frontiers
- August 22 : Battle of Rossignol
- August 24 : Saint-Vincent
- August 26 to 29 : combats in the sector of Luzy-Saint-Martin – Cesse with the 21st Colonial Artillery Regiment 21^{e} RAC
- September 6–7 : First Battle of the Marne : Écriennes, Vauclerc

==== 1915 ====
- February 16–23 : Champagne : fortin de Beauséjour
- May 15 : Ville-sur-Tourbe
- September 25 : battle of Champagne: Main-de-Massiges, Côte 191, Bois de l'Oreille.

==== 1916 ====
- February 26 around 1500 : more than half of the regiment (5 companies) were lost at sea while in transit to Thessaloniki, to join the 17th Colonial Infantry Division (France).

==== 1917 ====
French Army of the Orient (French: Armée française d'Orient, AFO)

- April to May : Battle of the Crna Bend (1917)

==== 1918 ====
- Serbia: Sokol, Dropolje, Kravtiza, battles during which the regiment was cited at the orders of the armed forces. During these five years of war, the 3^{e} endured the loss of 4750 men.
- September 15 to 18 : Vetrenik
- September 23 to 24 : Gradsko
- The regiment endured the loss of 4617 men morts au champ d'honneur.

=== Interwar period ===
- In 1925, the 3^{e} RIC was engaged in Morocco.
- 1919 – 1939 : garrisoned at Rochefort.

=== World War II ===
==== Phoney War ====
The 3rd Infantry Colonial Regiment 3^{e} RIC was one of the three infantry regiments of the 1st Colonial Infantry Division. This division was placed in reserve of the IInd Army which was the first in line to protect the Maginot Line in a turning manoeuvre.

==== Battle of France ====
- Combats in the region of Bouzanville and Beaumont-en-Argonne. At the corps of 21st corps, movement towards the north of meuse to intercept. Accordingly, the 3^{e} was found engaged in combat for a third time in the same region. Following, the 3^{e} protected the unfolding of the 1^{re} DIC on Saulx. During these engagements, the 3^{e} endured the loss of 500 men. The 3^{e} RIC was cited at the orders of the armed forces.
- 1940 : the 3^{e} RIC was dissolved.
- 1944 : battalion formed from Maquis of the south-west which gave formation to the 3^{e} RIC. Action in dordogne. Occupation of Bergerac and entry into Bordeaux. These units participated to the operations in North Africa.

=== 1945 to present ===
- From 1955 to 1957 : the regiment participated, under the form of a marching battalion, to operations in Tunisia, Morocco and Algeria.
- Absorbed by other colonial regiments, the battalion's regiments would not bear the insignia of the 3rd Marine. On December 31, 1957, the 3^{e} RIC was transformed into the center of instruction of the 3^{e} RIC which became that of the 3^{e} RIMa, on December 1, 1958.
- On March 1, 1963 : the regiment was reconstituted at Vannes by merger with the Régiment d'infanterie-chars de marine and the 9th Marine Infantry Brigade.
- Passed under the "motorized" type since 1969, the regiment was the first to be completely professionalized. With the DEVOM (Volunteer Detachment for Outre-Mer) destined to assume, during fifteen month, the relief of the 2nd Foreign Parachute Regiment 2^{e} REP in Tchad. The 3rd Marine Infantry Regiment was accordingly able to participate to all major exterior theatres of operations.
- The first regiment to be professionalized in 1973.
- From 1978 to 1980 : Opération Tacaud in Tchad. During this operation, the 3^{e} RIMa endured the loss of four with twelve wounded. The regiment was accordingly cited at the orders of the armed forces.
- The 3^{e} RIMa was engaged part of the Multinational Force in Lebanon and partook also in peacekeeping missions part of the United Nations Interim Force in Lebanon.
- 1991 : the regiment participated in the Gulf War as a unit of Division Daguet. The regiment was cited at the orders of the armed forces.
- 1995 : the 3^{e} RIMa illustrated capability at the Battle of Vrbanja Bridge. Actions led by the regiment allowed the blue helmets of the FORPRONU to exit from a passive position due to a first time engagement in hostile responses. Two casualties resulted from this event with seventeen others wounded.
- 2002 : the regiment was deployed to Kosovo at the corps of TF-MN north from October 2002 to January 2003 and formed first the BIMOTO 9 prior to constituting the BatFra 1 within the cadres of forces restructuration and the BiMéca.
- 2003 : following the launching of a Guepard alert, the regiment was projected to Bunia in the Democratic Republic of Congo from June to September 2003 with the cadre of Operation Artemis under the guidance of the EU. The deployment was reinforced by a M120 battery of the 11th Marine Artillery Regiment 11^{e} RAMa, a squadron of the 1st Parachute Hussard Regiment 1^{er} RHP and an engineer combat company of the 6th Engineer Regiment 6^{e} RG.
- 2009 : the 3^{e} RIMa integrated the corps of the GTI Kapisa since June 15, 2009, for six months. Until September 5, 2009, the GTIA led four main combat operations. Missions endured the loss of 5 and nine wounded.
- The 3rd Marine has also deployed to Soudan, Rwanda, Republic of Central Africa and Albania...

== Missions ==
Regularly projected in outre-mer missions (notably Guyana) and Africa (Chad, Gabon, Central) as all units that used to be referred as the "Colonial", the 3^{e} RIMa distinguished capability within Division Daguet during the first Gulf War and the former Yugoslavia, particularly in Sarajevo at the capture of the Vrbanja bridge in May 1995.

Since 2002, personnel of the regiment are deployed six months per year:

- 2002: NATO Kosovo Operation Trident – Bimoto then BATFRA 1
- 2003: Senegal, Côte d'Ivoire
- 2003: Democratic Rep. of Congo Ituri Bunia – En Ops Fr MAMBA + EU ARTEMIS
- 2004: Afghanistan, New Caledonia
- 2004–2005: Côte d'Ivoire
- 2005: Kosovo, RCA
- 2006–2007: Côte d'Ivoire
- 2008: Kosovo, RCA
- 2009: Afghanistan (Task Force Korrigan)
- 2012–2013: Mali

== Organisation ==
The regiment is articulated into 8 companies with approximately 1300 men and women:

- Compagnie de Commandement et de Logistique (CCL) – Command and Logistics Company
- 1^{re} Compagnie de Combat (1^{re} Cie) – 1st Combat Company
- 2^{e} Compagnie de Combat (2^{e} Cie) – 2nd Combat Company
- 3^{e} Compagnie de Combat (3^{e} Cie) – 3rd Combat Company
- 4^{e} Compagnie de Combat (4^{e} Cie) – 4th Combat Company
- 5^{e} Compagnie de Combat (5^{e} Cie) – 5th Combat Company
- Compagnie Antichar (CAC) longue portée – Long Range Anti-Tank Company (dormant since 2008)
- Compagnie d'Eclairage et d'Appui (CEA) – Reconnaissance and Support Company
- 6^{e} Compagnie de reserve (6^{e} Cie) – 6th Reserve Company

== Traditions ==
The anniversary is celebrated for combats in Bazeilles, the village which was apprehended and abandoned four consecutive times under orders, respectively on August 31 and September 1, 1870.

Et au Nom de Dieu, vive la coloniale !

In the Name of God, vive la coloniale !

The Marsouins and the Bigors have for Saint, God. This war calling concludes intimate ceremonies which part life in the regiments. Often also at origin as an act of grace to Charles de Foucauld.

=== Motto ===
"Debout les Morts". This sentence, which became the motto of the regiment is credited to Adjudant Péricard (3^{e} RIC) who voiced on February 27, 1915, to stimulate the troops, during the reapprehension of a fort. For this battle, the regiment endured the for the 1st and 2nd battalions of the 3^{e} RIC: 189 killed, 575 wounded and 250 missing.

=== Insignia of the 3^{e} RIMa ===
A Marine anchor with inscription "Bazeilles", a French Imperial Eagle, and the number 3. In 1975, during a regimental inspection, colonel Jean Joubert, regimental commander of the 3rd Marine Infantry Regiment noticed a sketch drawing realized by sergent-chef De Muynck of the 3rd section, 3rd company; accordingly the new insignia of the 3^{e} RIMa was created.

=== Decorations ===
The regimental colors of the 3rd Marine Infantry Regiment 3^{e} RIMa is decorated with:

- Croix de guerre 1914–1918 with:
  - 1 palm & 1 star
- Croix de guerre 1939–1945 with:
  - 1 palm
- croix de la Valeur militaire with:
  - 1 palm
- Commemorative Medal with:
  - clasp "Serbia"

The 3^{e} RIMa was cited at the orders of the armed forces in 1978 and in 1991. The regiment was awarded on October 16, 2014, the Fourragere with colors of the Croix de guerre 1914–1918.

=== Honours ===
==== Battle Honours ====
- Magador 1844
- Alma 1854
- Palikao 1860
- Ki-Hoa 1861
- Bazeilles 1870
- Sontay 1883
- La Marne 1914
- Champagne 1915
- Dobropolje 1918
- Koweït 1990–1991

== Regimental Commanders ==
=== 3^{e} RIC ===
- 1914: Colonel Lamolle
- September 5, 1914: Lieutenant-Colonel Condamy
- November 1, 1914 – December 6, 1914: Colonel Claudel

=== 3^{e} RIMa ===
- 1870: Colonel Lecamus
- 1886: Colonel Vinckel-Mayer
- 1965–1967: Colonel de La Longray
- 1967–1969: Colonel Fournier
- 1969–1971: Colonel Barthelemy
- 1971–1973: Colonel Emile Mistral
- 1973–1975: Colonel Guillermet
- 1975–1977: Colonel Joubert
- 1977–1979: Colonel Hamel
- 1979–1981: Colonel Rousseau-Dumarcet
- 1981–1983: Colonel Fages
- 1983–1985: Colonel Canal
- 1985–1987: Colonel Mourgeon
- 1987–1989: Colonel Coste
- 1989–1991: Colonel Thorette
- 1991–1993: Colonel Thévenon
- 1993–1995: Colonel Montfort
- 1995–1997: Colonel Leclère
- 1997–1999: Colonel de Jong
- 1999–2001: Colonel Commins
- 2001–2003: Colonel Rochet
- 2003–2005: Colonel de Woillemont
- 2005–2007: Colonel Lecointre
- 2007–2009: Colonel Chanson
- 2009–2011: Colonel Schill
- 2011–2013: Colonel Steiger
- 2013–2015: Colonel Hervé
- 2015–2017: Colonel Giraud
- 2017– : Lieutenant-colonel Ludovic Danigo

== Notable officers and marines ==
- Joseph Gallieni
