= Blue Division (Second French Empire) =

French Marine division during the Franco-Prussian War

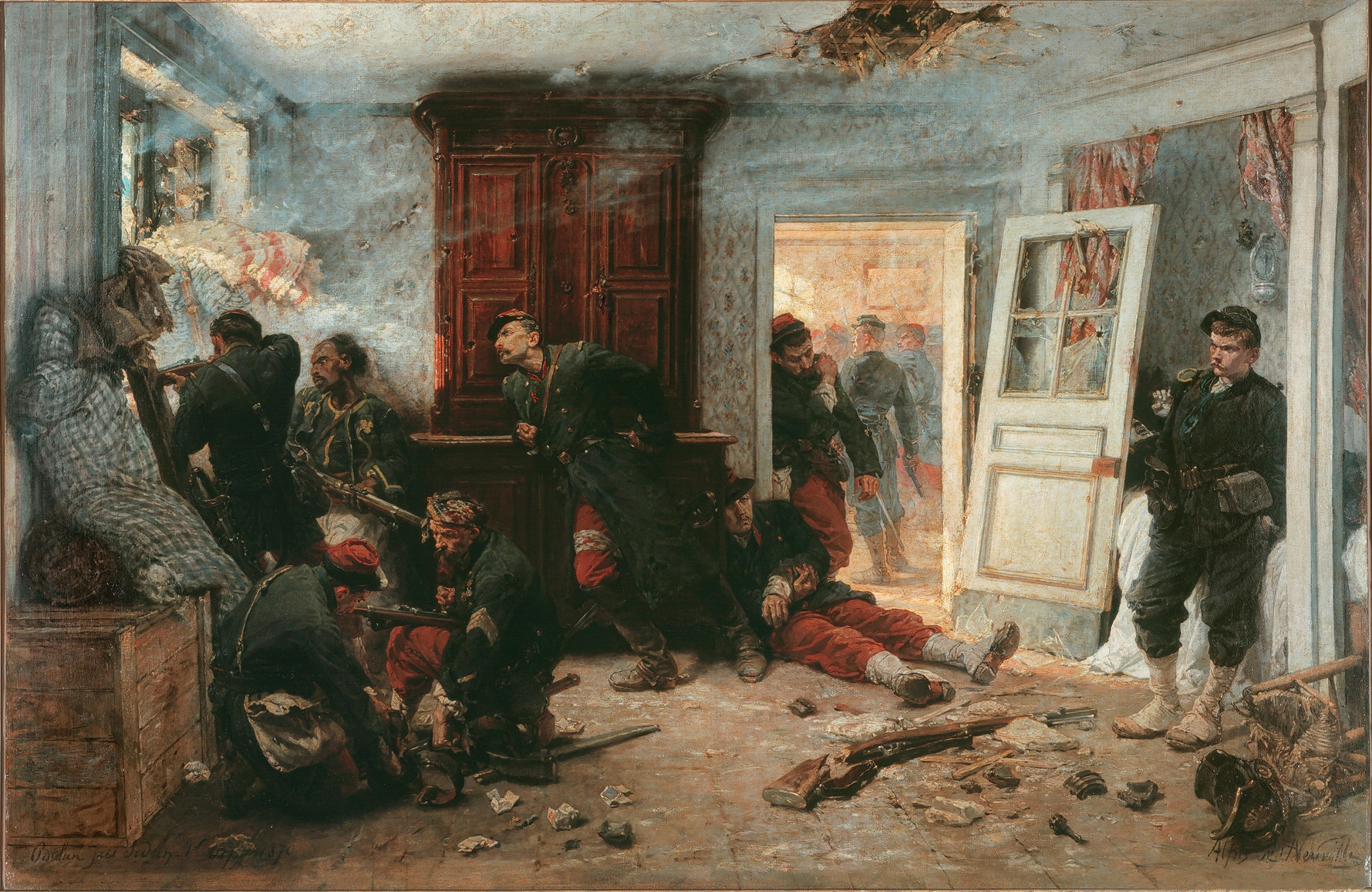
"The Last Cartridges" by Alphonse de Neuville

The Blue Division (French: Division Bleue) was a French division during the Franco-Prussian War of 1870. Consisting of Troupes de Marine, it was the first time in the history of the marines to combine marsouins, marine infantry, and bigors, or marine artillery.

Commanded by General Élie de Vassoigne, it was made up of two brigades:

- The 1st Brigade, commanded by General Reboul, was formed from the 1st Marine Infantry Regiment of Cherbourg and the 4th Marine Infantry Regiment of Toulon;
- The 2nd Brigade, commanded by General Martin des Pallières, comprised the 2nd Marine Infantry Regiment of Brest and the 3rd Marine Infantry Regiment of Rochefort, along with 3 batteries from the 1st Marine Artillery Regiment.

The Blue Division formed part of the 12th Army Corps under the command of Barthélémy Louis Joseph Lebrun, which was the last unit to arrive at Sedan after having made a last attempt to retreat with General de Wimpffen. It fought at Bazeilles on 31 August and 1 September 1870. The town was retaken and abandoned four times, with 2,655 French and 5,200 Bavarians dead, inspiring the patriotic painting Les dernières cartouches (The Last Cartridges) by Alphonse de Neuville. Each year the marines celebrate the anniversary of the battle, ending the ceremonies with the unit's battle cry, "Au nom de Dieu, vive la coloniale" ("In God's name, long live La Coloniale") - the unit had God Himself as its patron saint.
