= 3rd Colonial Infantry Division =

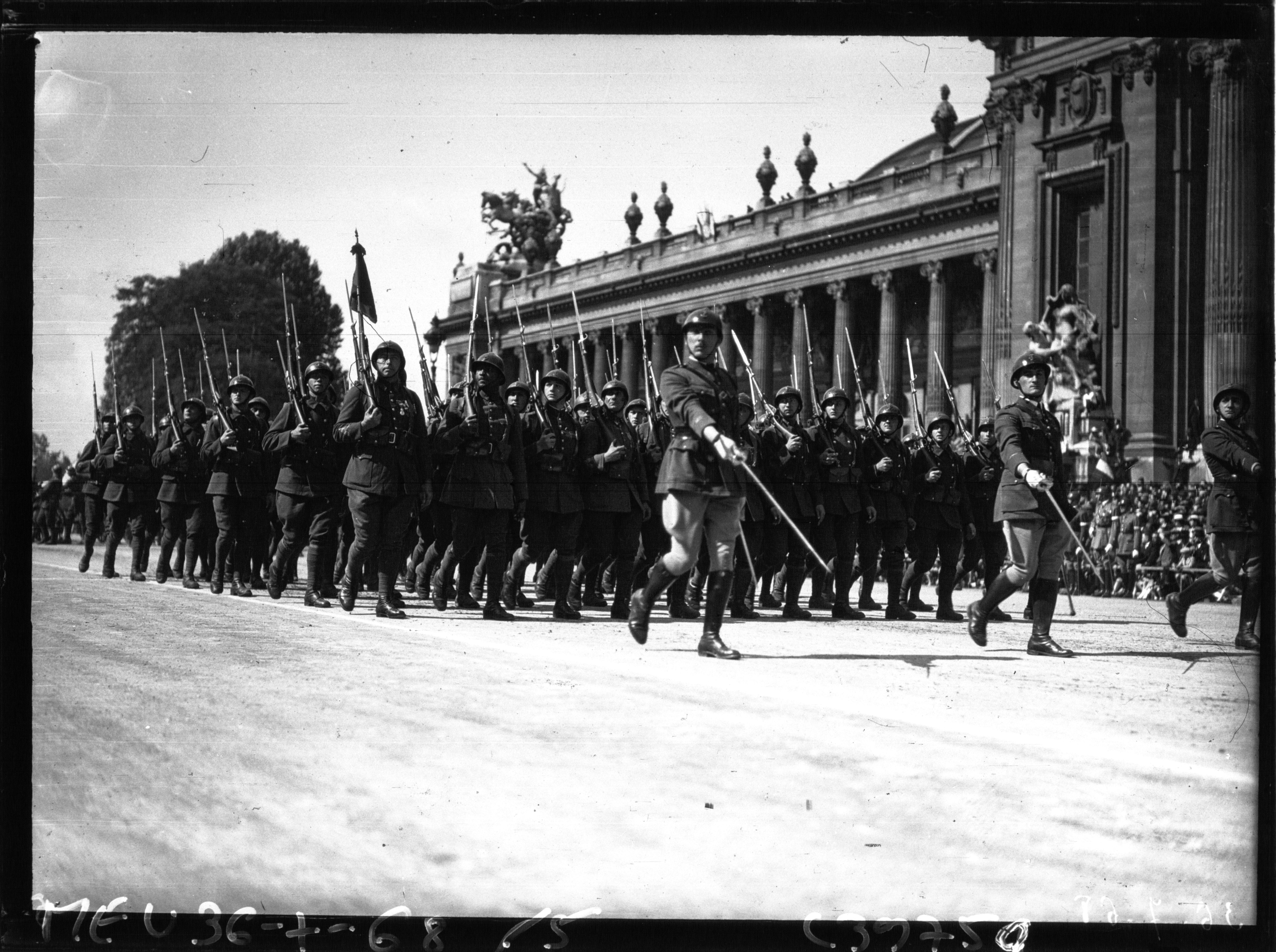
A regiment of the 3rd Colonial Infantry Division during the Bastille Day 1936 military parade in Paris.

The 3rd Colonial Infantry Division (French: 3e Division d'Infanterie Coloniale, 3e DIC) was a division of the French Marine Forces, comprising mostly French citizen troops.

The 3rd Colonial Infantry Division fought in the First and Second world wars.

== World War I ==
=== Composition ===
- 1^{er} Régiment d'infanterie coloniale August 1914
- 2^{e} Régiment d'infanterie coloniale August 1914
- 3^{e} Régiment d'infanterie coloniale August 1914 - February 1916
- 7e régiment d'infanterie coloniale August 1914 - November 1918
- 21^{e} Régiment d'infanterie coloniale August 1914 - November 1918
- 23e régiment d'infanterie coloniale end of 1914 - November 1918
- 58e régiment d'infanterie coloniale du Sénégal June - October 1916
- 1 Battalion of the 88e régiment d'infanterie territoriale August - November 1918

As part of the French 1st Colonial Corps (French: 1er corps d'armée colonial, 1er CAC), at various times it was part of the French First Army, French Second Army, French Third Army, French Fourth Army, French Fifth Army, French Sixth Army, French Seventh Army, French Eighth Army and French Tenth Army.

=== Engagements ===
1914: The division fought in the Battle of the Ardennes (where it lost roughly 11,000 men out of a contingent of 15,000), the Battle of the Meuse, the First Battle of the Marne and the First Battle of Champagne. 1915: Many small engagements, plus the Second Battle of Champagne. 1916: The Battle of the Somme (twice). 1917: The Second Battle of the Aisne, and many small engagements. 1918: The Third Battle of the Aisne, the 4th Battle of Champagne, the Second Battle of the Marne, and many minor engagements until the end of the war.

== Organization in World War 2 ==
The structure of the division in World War II was as follows:

- Chief of Staff, 3rd Colonial Infantry Division
  - Infantry Commander, 3rd Colonial Infantry Division
    - 1st Colonial Infantry Regiment
    - 21st Colonial Infantry Regiment
    - 23rd Colonial Infantry Regiment
  - Artillery Commander, 3rd Infantry Division
    - 3rd Colonial Divisional Artillery Regiment
    - 203rd Colonial Divisional Heavy Artillery Regiment

== See also ==
- Troupes de marine
- Fusiliers Marins - Naval light infantry
- French Colonial Forces
