= Barthélémy Louis Joseph Lebrun =

French general

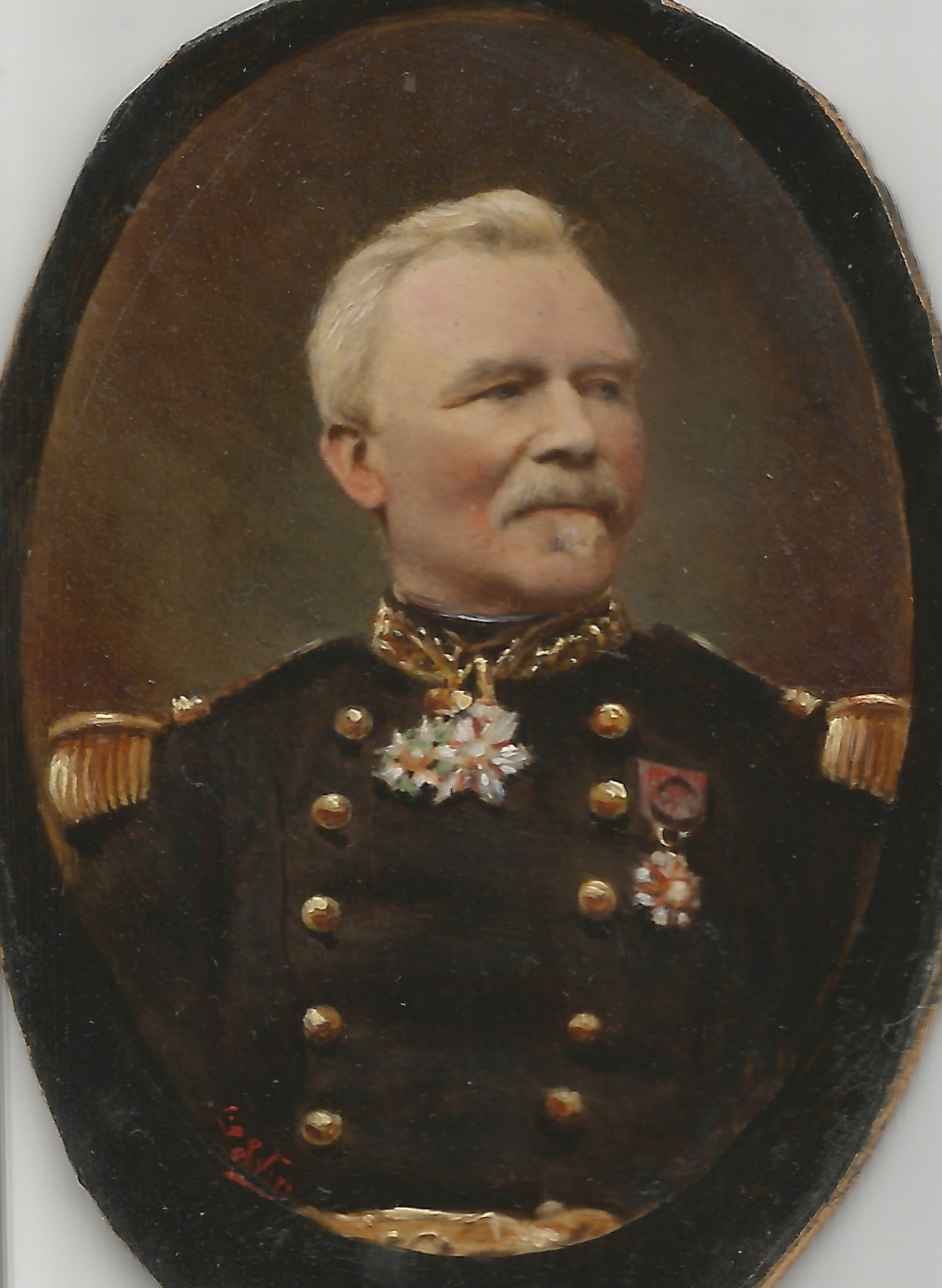
- Born: 22 October 1809; Landrecies
- Died: 6 October 1889 (aged 79) Paris
- Buried: Landrecies
- Allegiance: France
- Branch: Infantry
- Service years: 1829–1879
- Rank: general
- Commands: Paris Division; Châlons Division; 12th Corps; 3rd Corps
- Conflicts: Pacification of Algeria; Kabylie; Siege of Rome; Crimean War; Italy Campaign; Franco-Prussian War
- Awards: Légion d'honneur
- Other work: Inspector of the 5th then the 7th arrondissement of infantry; Emperor's aide de camp; Aide major général to the armée du Rhin; Inspector general of the école d'état-major

Barthélémy Louis Joseph Lebrun (22 October 1809, Landrecies – 6 October 1889, Paris) was a French Army officer of the Second French Empire.

== Life ==
Entering the école spéciale militaire de Saint-Cyr in 1829, he left it as a sous-lieutenant in 1831. Promoted to lieutenant in 1834, then to captain, he served in the 5th Dragoon Regiment. A chef d'escadron during the 1848 Revolution, he was beside general Négrier when the latter was wounded. He then participated in the siege of Rome in 1849 as chef d'état-major of the second division of the French expeditionary corps in the Mediterranean. Promoted to lieutenant-colonel, he was attached to the Constantine division as chef d'état major in 1852. Rising to colonel in January 1855, he fought in the Crimean War as chef d'état-major of the 2nd and then the 1st division of II Corps. Chef d'état-major to general Mac Mahon in 1855 in Algeria, he was then given the same post in the Paris division two years later. Made a general in 1858 he fought in the battles of Turbigo, Magenta and Solferino.

Chef d'état-major of the Imperial Guard in 1860, he was promoted to général de division in 1866 before becoming emperor's aide-de-camp in 1868. In 1870, he was given a diplomatic mission to Vienna before becoming chief aide-major-général of the armée du Rhin in 1870. He then commanded XII Corps in 1870, heading it in the battles of Beaumont, Mouzon, Bazeilles (where he commanded the Blue Division) and finally Sedan. He was held as a prisoner of war on the Iges peninsula (wishing to remain with his men) then in Germany at Koblenz then Aix-la-Chapelle. On his release he served in several roles, such as member of the Mixed Commission on Public Works, inspector general to the staff training school, president of the commission de révision du règlement sur le service des places, member of the defence committee and president of the commission on reorganisation of the army staff. He was also the author of several documents and books. He took command of III Corps from 1873 to 1879, when he retired, dying ten years later and being buried at the cemetery in his birthplace.
