= 12th Army Corps (France) =

- Country: France
- Branch: French Army
- Size: Army Corps
- Part of: Fourth Army; Tenth Army
- Engagements: Franco-Prussian War; First World War

Commanders
- Notable commanders: Barthélémy Louis Joseph Lebrun; Gaston de Galliffet

The 12th Army Corps (French: 12^{e} Corps d'Armée) was an army corps in the French Army. Commanded by Général Lebrun in the Franco-Prussian War then by General Galliffet from 1882 to 1886.

== World War I ==
On the outbreak of the First World War it was subordinated to Fourth Army.

Initial wartime organization of the Corps
Corps	Division	Brigade	Units
12th Corps	23rd Division	45th Infantry Brigade	63rd Infantry Regiment
12th Corps	23rd Division	45th Infantry Brigade	78th Infantry Regiment
12th Corps	23rd Division	46th Infantry Brigade	107th Infantry Regiment
12th Corps	23rd Division	46th Infantry Brigade	138th Infantry Regiment
12th Corps	23rd Division	Cavalry	1 Squadron, 21st Chasseurs à Cheval Regiment
12th Corps	23rd Division	Artillery	21st Field Artillery Regiment (3 Groupes of 75mm guns)
12th Corps	23rd Division	Engineers	6th Engineer Regiment (12/1 Company)
12th Corps	24th Division	47th Infantry Brigade	50th Infantry Regiment
12th Corps	24th Division	47th Infantry Brigade	108th Infantry Regiment
12th Corps	24th Division	48th Infantry Brigade	100th Infantry Regiment
12th Corps	24th Division	48th Infantry Brigade	126th Infantry Regiment
12th Corps	24th Division	Cavalry	1 Squadron, 21st Chasseurs à Cheval Regiment
12th Corps	24th Division	Artillery	34th Field Artillery Regiment (3 Groupes of 75mm guns)
12th Corps	24th Division	Engineers	6th Engineer Regiment (12/2 Company)
12th Corps	Corps Troops	Reserve Infantry Brigade	300th Reserve Infantry Regiment
12th Corps	Corps Troops	Reserve Infantry Brigade	326th Reserve Infantry Regiment
12th Corps	Corps Troops	Cavalry	4 Squadrons, 21st Chasseurs à Cheval Regiment
12th Corps	Corps Troops	Artillery	52nd Field Artillery Regiment (4 Groupes of 75mm guns)
12th Corps	Corps Troops	Engineers	6th Engineer Regiment (12/3, 12/4, 12/16 and 12/21 Companies)
12th Corps	Corps Troops		12th Squadron, Military Equipment Train
12th Corps	Corps Troops		12th Section, Staff Secretaries and Recruitment
12th Corps	Corps Troops		12th Section, Military Nursing
12th Corps	Corps Troops		12th Section, Clerks and Military Works Administration

It became part of the Tenth Army and was deployed in Italy from November 1917. It was later in action at the Second Battle of the Piave River and the Battle of Vittorio Veneto.

Its commanders in World War I were :

- 18 August 1913 : Pierre Auguste Roques
- 5 January 1915 : Henri Jean Descoings
- 12 May 1916 : Charles Nollet
- 25 October 1916 : Pierre Jean Charles Antoine Nourrisson
- 29 March 1918 : Jean César Graziani, also commander of all French forces in Italy.

== See also ==
- Achille Pierre Deffontaines
