= Battle of Bazeilles =

Battle of the Franco-Prussian War

- Part of the Franco-Prussian War
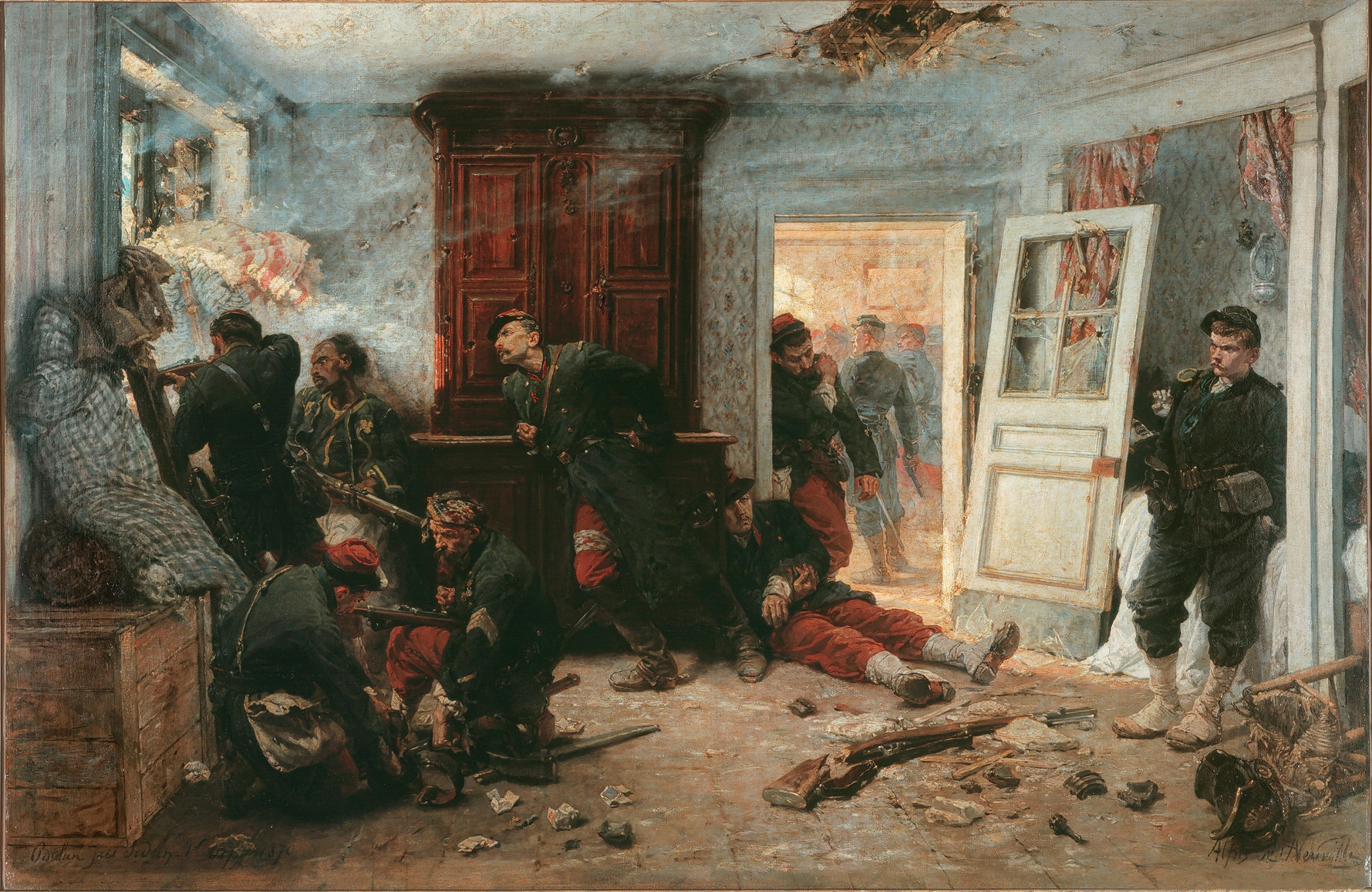
- Les dernières cartouches, Alphonse-Marie-Adolphe de Neuville
Date	1 September 1870
Location	Bazeilles, France 49.678°N 4.977°E
Result	Bavarian victory

Belligerents
Bavaria	France

Commanders and leaders
Ludwig von der Tann	Élie de Vassoigne; Arsène Lambert

Units involved
Royal Bavarian Corps	Blue Division

Casualties and losses
4,089 killed or wounded	2,655 killed or wounded
- 39 civilians killed

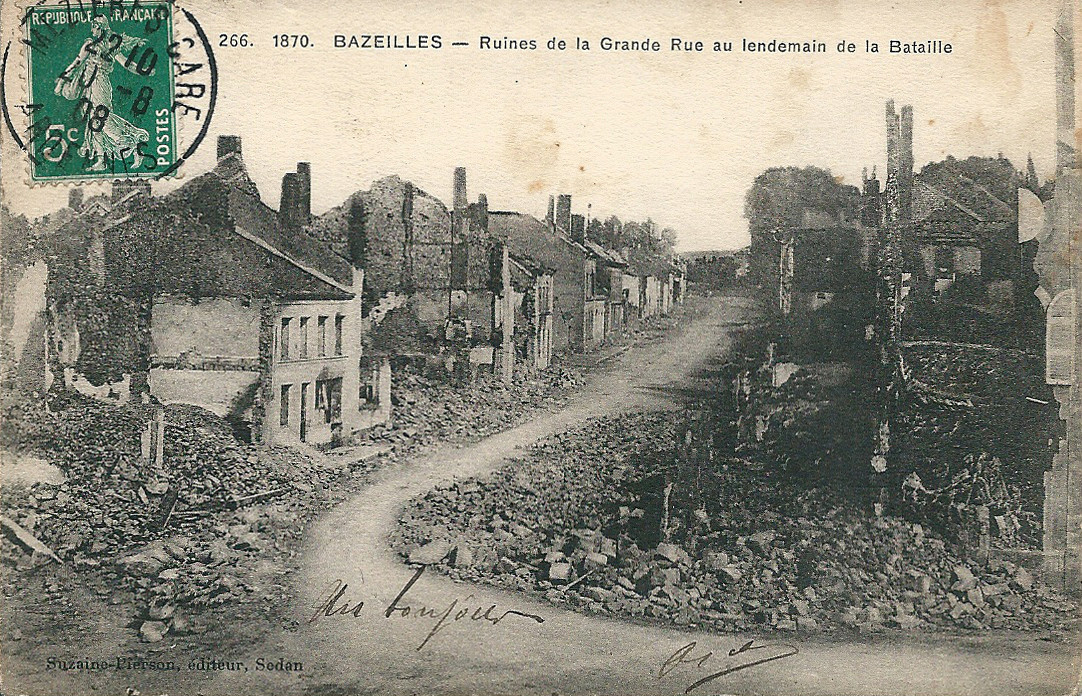
Bazeilles in ruins after the battle.

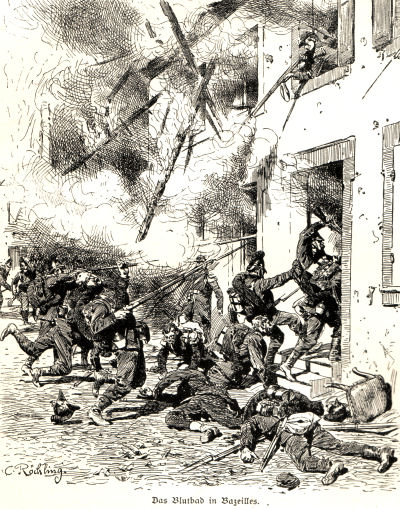
Das Blutbad in Bazeilles. Bavarian troops were ambushed by French marines hiding in a house.

The Battle of Bazeilles was fought on 1 September 1870 during the Franco-Prussian War as a portion of the larger Battle of Sedan and was one of the first battles to feature modern urban warfare tactics. It took place in Bazeilles, France, a small village in the department of Ardennes near Sedan, and involved a force of Bavarian soldiers battling against French marines and partisans.

The battle was, in effect, an ambush of the Bavarians (who were allies of the Prussians), by a small detachment of the "Blue Division" Troupes de marine (known also as marsouins), under the command of Élie de Vassoigne. Marsouin snipers, along with local guerrillas, fired on the Bavarian troops using quick-firing Chassepot breech-loading rifles.

Although outnumbered ten to one, the French held the village until Napoleon III gave orders to withdraw. A small group under commander Arsène Lambert remained in the last house on the road to Sedan, the Auberge Bourgerie, fighting to the last bullet in order to cover the retreat.

After seven hours of conflict, the Bavarian troops took the village, and the captured Franc-tireur partisans, along with other civilians who were considered unlawful combatants, were later executed.

Later that same day, France suffered crushing defeats at the Battle of Sedan where Napoleon III and his army were captured. Coupled with the loss of another French army at Metz, these battles effectively ended Napoleon III's Empire, ushering in the Third Republic. For several months, people of the new republic saw continued partisan warfare.

General de Vassoigne famously remarked on the French soldiers involved in the battle, "The troupes de marine fought beyond the extreme limits of duty."

The anniversary of the Battle of Bazeilles is now celebrated by the Troupes de marine.

== Course ==
The Bavarian vanguard had prevented the demolition of the railroad bridge south of Bazeilles the previous day, encountering fierce resistance in the pursuit of their enemy. That evening they retired to the bridgehead north of the Meuse. The following night the French army secured Bazeilles with infantry and Marines of the "Blue Division". They were tasked with defending the place to the last shot. Roads and houses were barricaded for defense.

The Chief of Staff Helmuth von Moltke was still leading troops up to the front-line at the time. Due to poor visibility, the Bavarian units quickly suffered heavy casualties during the attack. Continued troop reinforcements resulted in continued battle-readiness among the 1st and 2nd divisions at 9:00 AM. At 11:00 AM, the French began to withdraw as the area between Bazeilles and Sedan could no longer be held.

During the battle, French civilians actively participated by firing on Bavarian troops and tending to the wounded. Angered by the casualties the civilians inflicted, the Bavarian soldiers killed many of them, setting fire to houses from which the shots were fired. By midday, the whole village was on fire.

== Casualties ==
The French army suffered 2,655 casualties. The Bavarian army lost 213 officers and 3,876 men. Although French propaganda showed massacres of men, women and children, an official French investigation found that 39 civilians from Bazeilles died. An additional 150 people (10% of the population) died from injuries in the subsequent months.

The battle for Bazeilles was a dark day for the Bavarian army; General Carl Von Helvig deemed it "a bloody contribution to the Bavarian military honor, an honorable putty for German unity." For many military artists and illustrators of the late 19th century, the struggle for Bazeilles was a popular motif. Michael Zeno Diemer described it in 1896, resulting in a panorama depicting the struggle for Bazeilles. It was shown in a building in Mannheim. Anton von Werner featured it in his 1883 Sedan panorama on Alexanderplatz in Berlin. The painters Otto von Faber du Faur, Friedrich Bodenmüller, Franz Adam, Carl Röchling, Richard Knötel, and the Frenchman Alphonse de Neuville all created representations of the battle.

Today the French Troupes de Marine recognizes the defense of the last house on the road to Sedan as an identity-building event.
