= List of French Army regiments =

The following is a current list of regiments of the French Army.

== Infantry ==
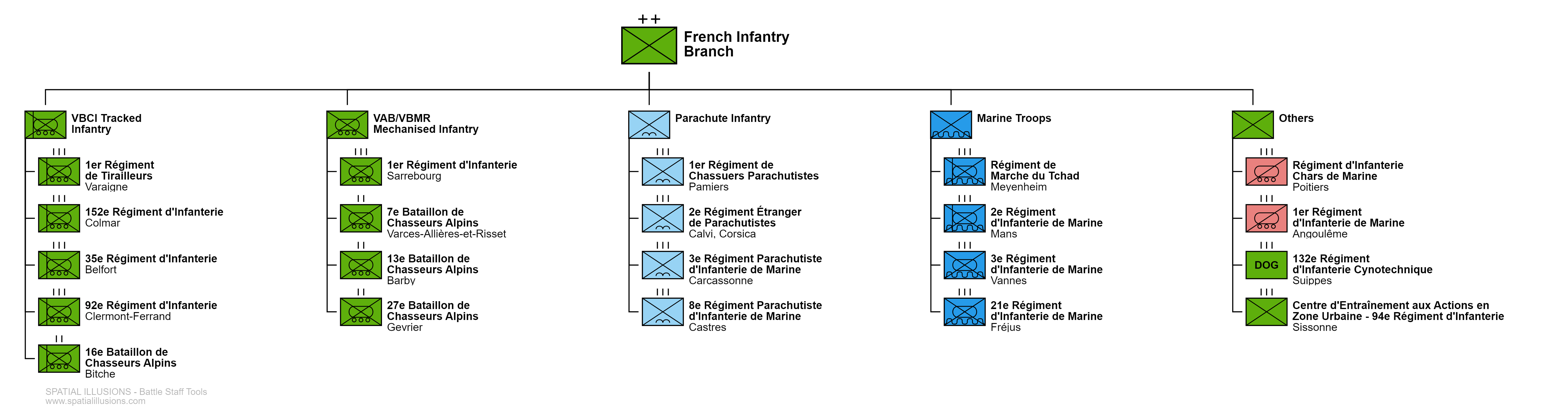
French Infantry Command

=== Line Infantry ===
- 1st Infantry Regiment (1^{er} RI), 1st Mechanised Brigade (1^{re} BM) – Sarrebourg
- 24th Infantry Regiment (24^{e} RI), Commandement des Forces Terrestres (CFT; Land Forces Command) – Versailles
- 35th Infantry Regiment (35^{e} RI), 7th Armoured Brigade (7^{e} BB) – Belfort
- 44th Infantry Regiment (44^{e} RI) – Paris, administrative support regiment for the Directorate General for External Security
- 92nd Infantry Regiment (92^{e} RI), 3rd Light Armoured Brigade (3^{e} BLB) – Clermond-Ferrand
- 126th Infantry Regiment (126^{e} RI), 3^{e} BLB – Brive-la-Gaillarde
- 132nd Cynotechnical Infantry Regiment (132^{e} RIC) – Suippes.
- 152nd Infantry Regiment (152^{e} RI), 7^{e} BB – Colmar.

=== Tirailleurs ===
- 1st Tirailleur Regiment (1^{er} RTir), 1^{re} BM – Épinal.

=== Chasseurs ===
- 16th Chasseur Battalion (16^{e} BCP), 2nd Armoured Brigade (2^{e} BB) – Bitche

=== Parachutistes ===
- 1st Parachute Chasseur Regiment (1^{er} RCP), 11th Parachute Brigade (11^{e} BP) – Pamiers

=== Troupes de Montagne – Chasseurs Alpins ===
- 7th Chasseurs Alpins Battalion (7^{e} BCA), 27th Mountain Infantry Brigade (27^{e} BIM) – Varces-Allières-et-Risset
- 13th Chasseurs Alpins Battalion (13^{e} BCA), 27^{e} BIM – Barby
- 27th Chasseurs Alpins Battalion (27^{e} BCA), 27^{e} BIM – Cran-Gevrier

== Armoured Cavalry Arm ==
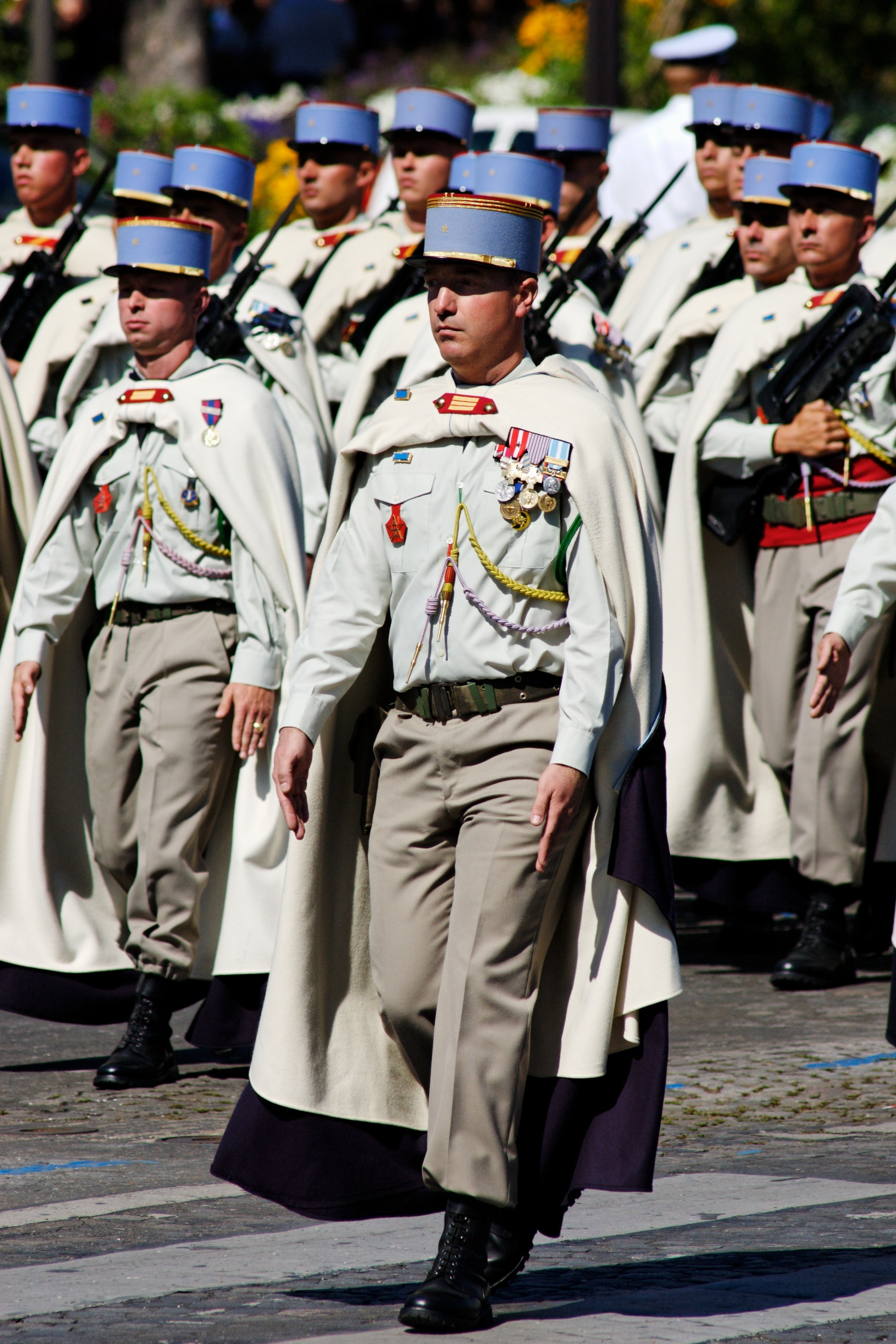
1st Regiment of Spahis, Bastille Day 2008 military parade on the Champs-Élysées, Paris.

- 501^{e} Régiment de chars de combat (501^{e} RCC), 2^{e} BB – Mourmelon

==== Spahi ====
- 1st Spahi Regiment (1^{er} RS), 1^{re} BM – Valence

==== Chasseurs d'Afrique ====
- 1st Chasseurs d'Afrique Regiment (1^{er} RCA), Unité d'entrainement et de formation (Training Unit) – Canjuers

==== Chasseurs ====
- 1st Chasseurs Regiment (1^{er} RCh), 7^{e} BB – Thierville-sur-Meuse

=== Dragoons ===
- 2nd Dragoon Regiment (2^{e} RD) – Fontevraud-l'Abbaye, CBRN defense
- 5th Dragoon Regiment (5^{e} RD), 7^{e} BB – Mailly-le-Camp

=== Hussars ===
- 2nd Hussar Regiment (2^{e} RH), Brigade de Renseignement (BR; Intelligence Brigade) – Haguenau
- 3rd Hussar Regiment (3^{e} RH), Franco-German Brigade (BFA) – Metz

=== Cuirrasiers ===
- 5th Cuirassier Regiment (5^{e} RC) – Abu Dhabi, United Arab Emirates
- 12th Cuirassier Regiment (12^{e} RC), 2^{e} BB – Olivet

=== Mountain Troops ===
- 4th Chasseurs Regiment (4^{e} RCh), 27^{e} BIM – Gap

=== Parachute ===
- 1st Parachute Hussar Regiment (1^{er} RHP), 1^{e} BP – Tarbes
- 13th Parachute Dragoon Regiment (13^{e} RDP) – Martignas-sur-Jalle

== Artillerie (Artillery) ==
- 1^{er} Régiment d'Artillerie (1st Artillery Regiment), 7^{e} BB – Belfort
- 8^{e} Régiment d'Artillerie (8th Artillery Regiment), 7^{e} BB – Commercy
- 17^{e} Groupe d'Artillerie (17th Artillery Battalion), Unité d'entrainement et de formation (Training Unit) – Biscarrosse
- 28^{e} Groupe Géographique (28th "Mapping" Battalion), BR – Oberhoffen-sur-Moder
- 40^{e} Régiment d'Artillerie (40th Artillery Regiment), 2^{e} BB – Suippes
- 54^{e} Régiment d'Artillerie (54th Artillery Regiment), 7^{e} BB – Hyers
- 61^{e} Régiment d'Artillerie (61st Artillery Regiment), BR – Chaumont
- 68^{e} Régiment d'Artillerie d'Afrique (68th African Artillery Regiment), 3^{e} BLB – La Valbonne

=== Artillerie Parachutistes (Parachute Artillery) ===
- 35^{e} Régiment d'Artillerie Parachutiste (35th Parachute Artillery Regiment), 11^{e} BP – Tarbes

=== Troupes de Montagne (Mountain Troops) ===
- 93^{e} Régiment d'Artillerie de Montagne (93rd Mountain Artillery Regiment), 27^{e} BIM – Varces

== Génie (Engineers) ==
- 3^{e} Régiment du Génie (3rd Engineer Regiment), 1^{re} BM – Charleville
- 5^{e} Régiment du Génie (5th Engineer Regiment)
- 6^{e} Régiment du Génie (6th Engineer Regiment), 9th Marine Infantry Brigade (9^{e} BIMa) – Angers
- 13^{e} Régiment du Génie (13th Engineer Regiment), 2^{e} BB – Le Valdahon
- 19^{e} Régiment du Génie (19th Engineer Regiment), 7^{e} BB – Besançon
- 31^{e} Régiment du Génie (31st Engineer Regiment), 3^{e} BLB – Castelsarrasin

=== Parachute and Air Support Engineers ===
- 17^{e} Régiment du Génie Parachutiste (17th Parachute Engineer Regiment), 11^{e} BP – Montauban
- 25^{e} Régiment du Génie de l'Air (25th Air Engineer Regiment) – Istres

== Army Aviation ==
- 1^{er} Régiment d'Hélicoptères de Combat (1st Combat Helicopter Regiment), CFT – Phalsbourg
- 3^{e} Régiment d'Hélicoptères de Combat (3rd Combat Helicopter Regiment), CFT – Étain
- 5^{e} Régiment d'Hélicoptères de Combat (5th Combat Helicopter Regiment), CFT – Pau
- 4^{e} Régiment d'Hélicoptères des Forces Spéciales (4th Special Forces Helicopter Regiment), Brigade des Forces Spéciales (Special Forces Brigade) – Pau

== Transmissions (Signals) ==
- 28^{e} Régiment de Transmissions (28th Signal Regiment), Brigade de Transmissions (BT; Signal Brigade) – Issoire
- 40^{e} Régiment de Transmissions (40th Signal Regiment), BT – Thionville
- 41^{e} Régiment de Transmissions (41st Signal Regiment) – Douai
- 44^{e} Régiment de Transmissions (44th Signal Regiment), BR – Mutzig
- 48^{e} Régiment de Transmissions (48th Signal Regiment), BT – Agen
- 53^{e} Régiment de Transmissions (53rd Signal Regiment), BT – Lunéville
- 54^{e} Régiment de Transmissions (54th Signal Regiment), BR – Haguenau
- 785^{e} compagnie de guerre électronique (785th Electronic Warfare Company) – Orléans

== Train (Transportation) ==
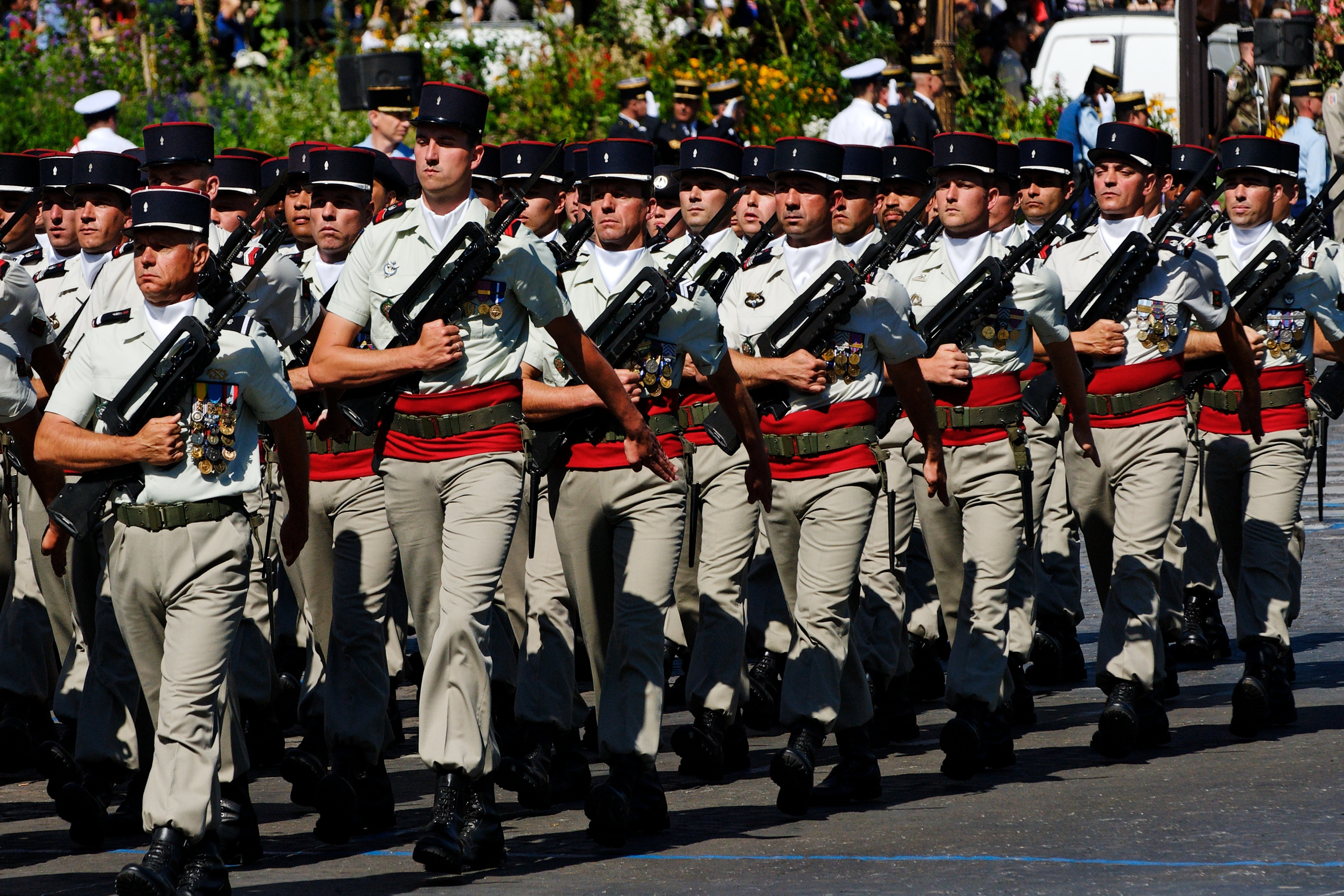
511th Regiment of Transport, Bastille Day 2008 military parade on the Champs-Élysées, Paris

- 121^{e} Régiment du Train (121st Transportation Regiment), Logistics Brigade (BLOG) – Linas-Montlhery
- 503^{e} Régiment du Train (503rd Transportation Regiment), BLOG – Nîmes
- 511^{e} Régiment du Train (511th Transportation Regiment), BLOG – Auxonne
- 515^{e} Régiment du Train (515th Transportation Regiment), BLOG – Brie
- 516^{e} Régiment du Train (516th Transportation Regiment), BLOG – Toul
- 519^{e} Groupe de Transit Maritime – Toulon

=== Parachutistes Train (Parachute Train) ===
- 1er Régiment du Train Parachutiste (1st Airborne Transportation Regiment), 11^{e} BP – Toulouse

== Matériel (Quartermaster) ==
- 2^{e} Régiment du Matériel (2nd Quartermaster Regiment), Service de maintenance industrielle terrestre – Bruz
- 3^{e} Régiment du Matériel (3rd Quartermaster Regiment), Service de maintenance industrielle terrestre – Muret
- 4^{e} Régiment du Matériel (4th Quartermaster Regiment), Service de maintenance industrielle terrestre – Nîmes
- 6^{e} Régiment du Matériel (6th Quartermaster Regiment), Service de maintenance industrielle terrestre – Besançon
- 7^{e} Régiment du Matériel (7th Quartermaster Regiment), Service de maintenance industrielle terrestre – Lyon
- 8^{e} Régiment du Matériel (8th Quartermaster Regiment), Service de maintenance industrielle terrestre – Mourmelon

== Other ==
- Régiment de soutien opérationnel (Operational Support Regiment - Administrative) – Toulouse
- Régiment Médical (Medical Regiment), BLOG – La Valbonne

== Troupes de Marine (Marine Troops) ==
=== Infanterie (Infantry) ===
- 2^{e} Régiment d'Infanterie de Marine (2nd Marine Infantry Regiment), 9^{e} BIMa – Le Mans
- 3^{e} Régiment d'Infanterie de Marine (3rd Marine Infantry Regiment), 9^{e} BIMa – Vannes
- 6^{e} Bataillon d'Infanterie de Marine (6th Marine Infantry Battalion), Unités en Pays Africain (Units in Africa) – Libreville (Gabon)
- 9^{e} Régiment d'Infanterie de Marine (9th Marine Infantry Regiment), Unités des départements et territoires d'Outre Mer Français (Units in French overseas departments and territories) – Cayenne (French Guiana)
- 21^{e} Régiment d'Infanterie de Marine (21st Marine Infantry Regiment), 6th Light Armoured Brigade (6^{e} BLB) – Fréjus
- Régiment de Marche du Tchad (Marching Regiment of Chad), 2^{e} BB – Meyenheim
- Régiment d'Infanterie de Marine du Pacifique-Nouvelle Calédonie (Marine Infantry Regiment of the Pacific-New Caledonia), Unités des départements et territoires d'Outre Mer Français (Units in French overseas departments and territories) – Nouméa

==== Parachutistes d'Infanterie de Marine (Marine Infantry Parachute) ====
- 1^{er} Régiment de Parachutistes d'Infanterie de Marine (1st Marine Infantry Parachute Regiment), Brigade des Forces Spéciales (Special Forces Brigade) – Bayonne
- 2^{e} Régiment de Parachutistes d'Infanterie de Marine (2nd Marine Infantry Parachute Regiment), Unités des départements et territoires d'Outre Mer Français (Units in French overseas departments and territories) – Réunion
- 3^{e} Régiment de Parachutistes d'Infanterie de Marine, (3rd Marine Infantry Parachute Regiment), 11^{e} BP – Carcassonne
- 8^{e} Régiment de Parachutistes d'Infanterie de Marine, (8th Marine Infantry Parachute Regiment), 11^{e} BP – Castres

=== Unités Blindées (Armoured Units) ===
Note: These units are technically part of the infantry but operate and use equipment similar to the Arme Blindée Cavalerie (Armoured Cavalry). Like the US Marine Corps, the Troupes de Marine do not use the definition "Cavalry".

- 1^{er} Régiment d'Infanterie de Marine (1st Marine Infantry Regiment), 3^{e} Brigade mécanisée (3rd Mechanised Brigade') – Angoulême
- Régiment d'infanterie-chars de marine (Marine Infantry-Tank Regiment), 9^{e} BIMa – Poitiers

=== Artillerie (Artillery) ===
- 3^{e} Régiment d'Artilerie de Marine (3rd Marine Artillery Regiment), 6^{e} BLB – Canjuers
- 11^{e} Régiment d'Artilerie de Marine (11th Marine Artillery Regiment), 9^{e} BIMa – St. Aubin du Cormier

=== Interarmes ===
Note: This unit combines infantry company, light cavalry squadron and artillery battery within the same regiment.

- 5^{e} Régiment Interarmes Outre Mer Unités en Pays Africain (Units in Africa) – Djibouti

== Légion Etrangère (Foreign Legion) ==
=== Infanterie (Infantry) ===
- 1^{er} Régiment Etranger (1st Foreign Regiment), Aubagne, France, (Recruiting Regiment, COM.LE - Commandment of the Foreign Legion, Transfer Regiment for incoming and outgoing soldiers from/to other Regiments, Secret Service of the FFL, Administration of the FFL).
- 2^{e} Régiment Etranger d'Infanterie (2nd Foreign Infantry Regiment), 6^{e} BLB – Nîmes.
- 3^{e} Régiment Etranger d'Infanterie (3rd Foreign Infantry Regiment), Unités des départements et territoires d'Outre Mer Français (Units in French overseas departments and territories) – Kourou (French Guiana).
- 4^{e} Régiment Etranger (4th Foreign Regiment), Castelnaudary, France, (Education regiment)
- 13^{e} Demi-Brigade de la Légion Etrangère (13th Demi-Brigade of the Foreign Legion), Camp du Larzac.
- Détachement de la Légion Etrangère à Mayotte (Foreign Legion Detachment in Mayotte), Unités des départements et territoires d'Outre Mer Français (Units in French overseas departments and territories) – Mayotte, Comore Islands.

==== Parachutistes (Airborne) ====
- 2^{e} Régiment Etranger Parachutiste (2nd Foreign Parachute Regiment), 11^{e} BP – Calvi, Haute-Corse

=== Cavalerie Blindée (Armoured Cavalry) ===
- 1^{er} Régiment Etranger de Cavalerie (1st Foreign Cavalry Regiment), 6^{e} BLB – Orange

=== Génie Combat (Combat Engineers) ===
- 1^{e} Régiment Etranger du Génie (1st Foreign Engineer Regiment), 6^{e} BLB – Laudun.
  - DINOPS Teams
- 2^{e} Régiment Etranger du Génie (2nd Foreign Engineer Regiment), 27^{e} BIM – Saint-Christol.
  - DINOPS Teams
- Mountain Commando Groups (GCM)

== Franco-Allemande (Franco-German Brigade) ==
- Brigade Franco-allemande (Franco-German Brigade)

== Notes ==
Year founded:

- 1635 1st Cuirassier Regiment (France) carried on by the 1st Cuirassier Squadrons Group of the 1st-11th Cuirassier Regiment.
- 1635 6th Cuirassier Regiment (France) carried on by merged with the 12th Cuirassier Regiment to form the 6th-12th Cuirassier Regiment
- 1645 3rd Cuirassier Regiment (France) carried on by the 2nd Squadron of the 5th Cuirassier Regiment and the E.E.D. of the 57th D.B.
- 1676 13th Parachute Dragoon Regiment founded as a Dragoon Regiment
- 1684 Saintonge Regiment carried on by the 82éme Regiment of Infantry.
- 1688 12th Cuirassier Regiment (France) carried on by the 6th Cuirassier Regiment to form the 6th-12th Cuirassier Regiment.
- 1690 Royal Suédois regiment flag and traditions carried on by company in the French Army's 4th Infantry Regiment.
- 1720 1st Parachute Hussar Regiment
