= Madama =

Military outpost in Niger

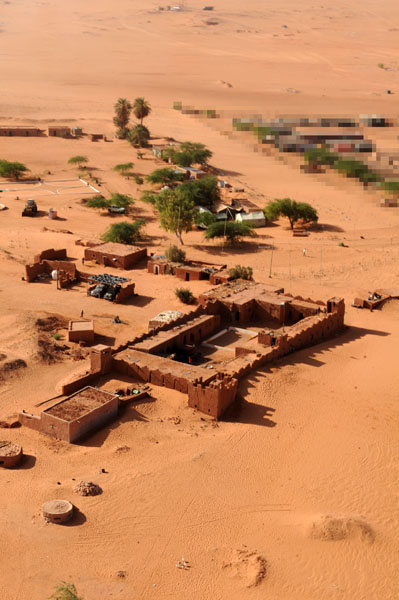
Aerial view of the fort of Madama, November 2014

Madama is a border settlement on the northeast frontier of Niger. Little more than an army post, the settlement serves as a frontier station controlling travel between Niger and Libya. It is also the site of a former French colonial fort, built in 1931. The fort is now surrounded by barbed wire and a field of landmines.

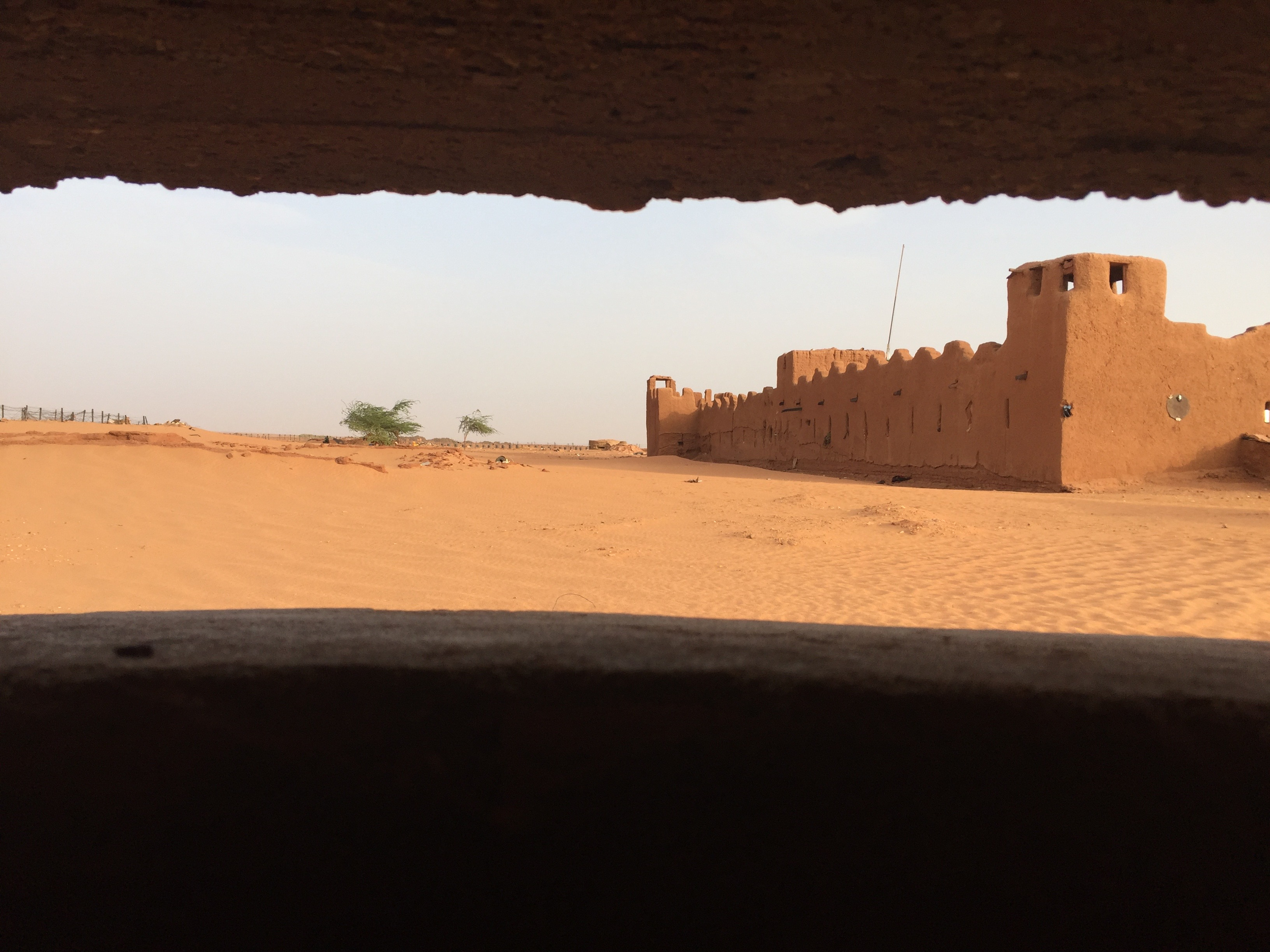
View on Fort Madama from the North, June 2017

== Military use today ==
The army of Niger maintains a garrison of a hundred soldiers, depending on the 24th Interarmes Battalion from Dirkou.

On October 23, 2014, the French government announced plans to base helicopters and 50 French troops here, under the Operation Barkhane. The French Army built a forward operating base. The French military is about 200 to 250 soldiers on January 1, 2015.

The operational base of Madama served as a command post for a military operation zone control for the French, Niger and Chad armies from 20 to 27 December 2014.

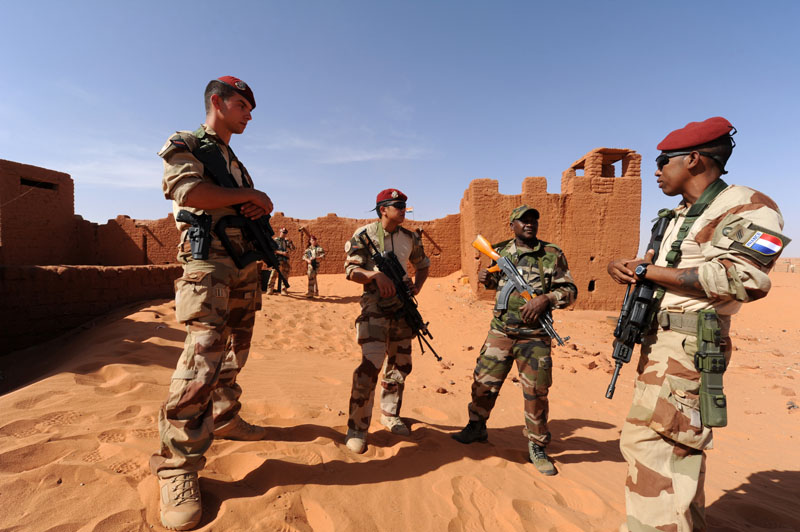
French paratroopers (3rd RPIMa) and Nigerien soldiers talk over the old fort Madama, November 2014.

=== Madama Airfield ===
Aerodrome Madama consists of a laterite track (21°57′0.10″N 13°39′2.13″E) with a length of 1,300 metres (4,300 ft). The work of the 25th Air Engineer Regiment and the 19th Engineer Regiment allowed the reconstruction of the runway from November 2014; will be extended to a length of 1,800 metres (5,900 ft). Aviation facilities will be added: a ramp and two parking areas for aircraft and helicopter pads.

Tactical transport aircraft can land there since December 2014. In 2017, the A400M transport aircraft made its first operational mission to Niger after landing at Madama.
