= Cuirassier =

Type of heavy cavalry that wore a cuirass

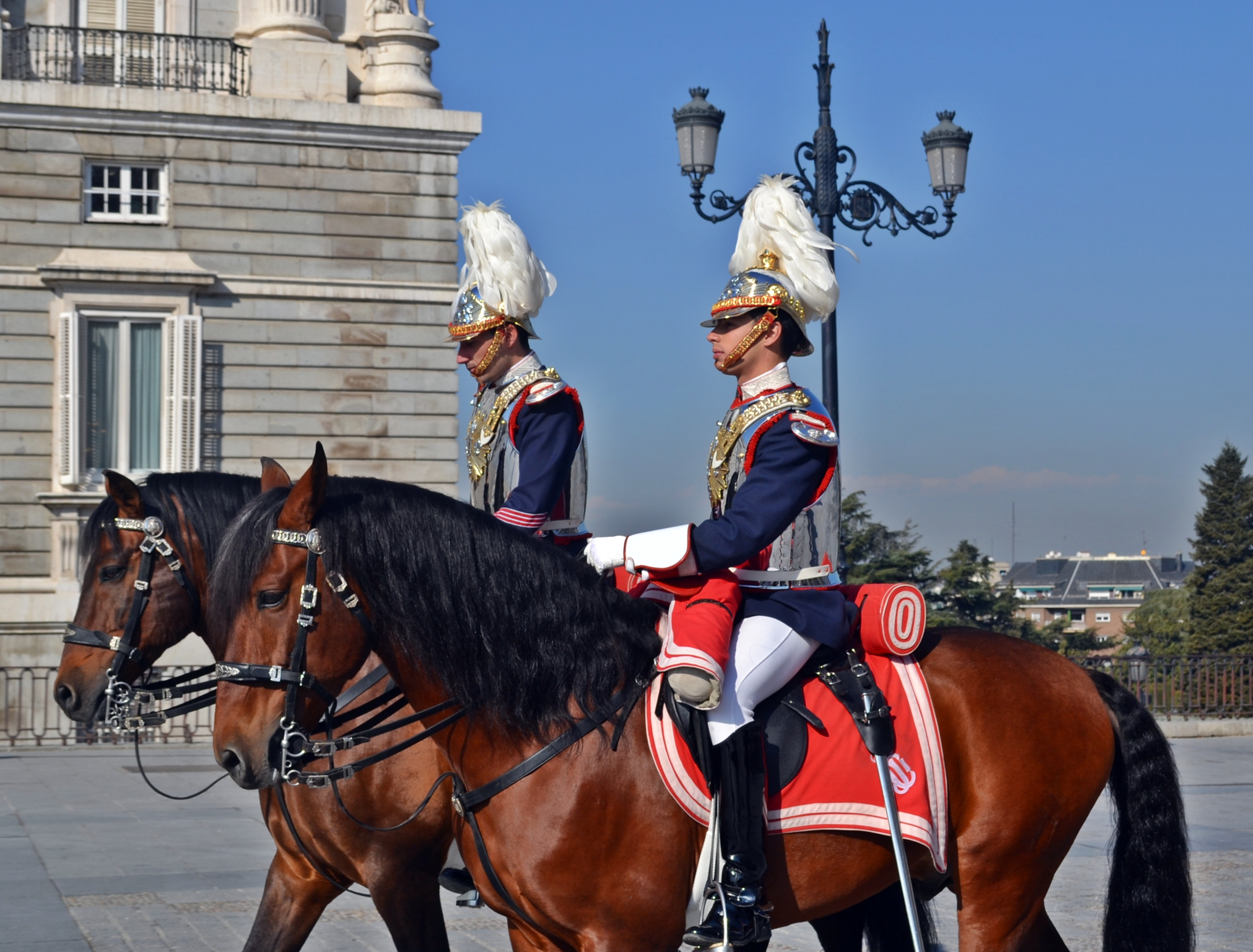
Cuirassiers of the Spanish Royal Guard in 2012

A cuirassier (/ˌkwɪrəˈsɪər/ KWIRR-ə-SEER; French: [kɥiʁasje]; French for 'one wearing a cuirass') was a cavalryman equipped with a cuirass, sword, and pistols. Cuirassiers first appeared in mid-to-late 16th century Europe as a result of armoured cavalry such as men-at-arms and demi-lancers discarding their lances and adopting pistols as their primary weapon. In the later part of the 17th century, the cuirassier lost his limb armour and subsequently wore only the cuirass (breastplate and backplate), and sometimes a helmet. By this time, the sword or sabre had become his primary weapon, with pistols relegated to a secondary function.

Cuirassiers achieved increased prominence during the Napoleonic Wars and were last fielded in the opening stages of World War I (1914–1918). A number of countries continue to use cuirassiers as ceremonial troops.

The French term cuirassier means "one with a cuirass" (French: cuirasse), the breastplate armour which they wore.

== 16th and 17th centuries ==
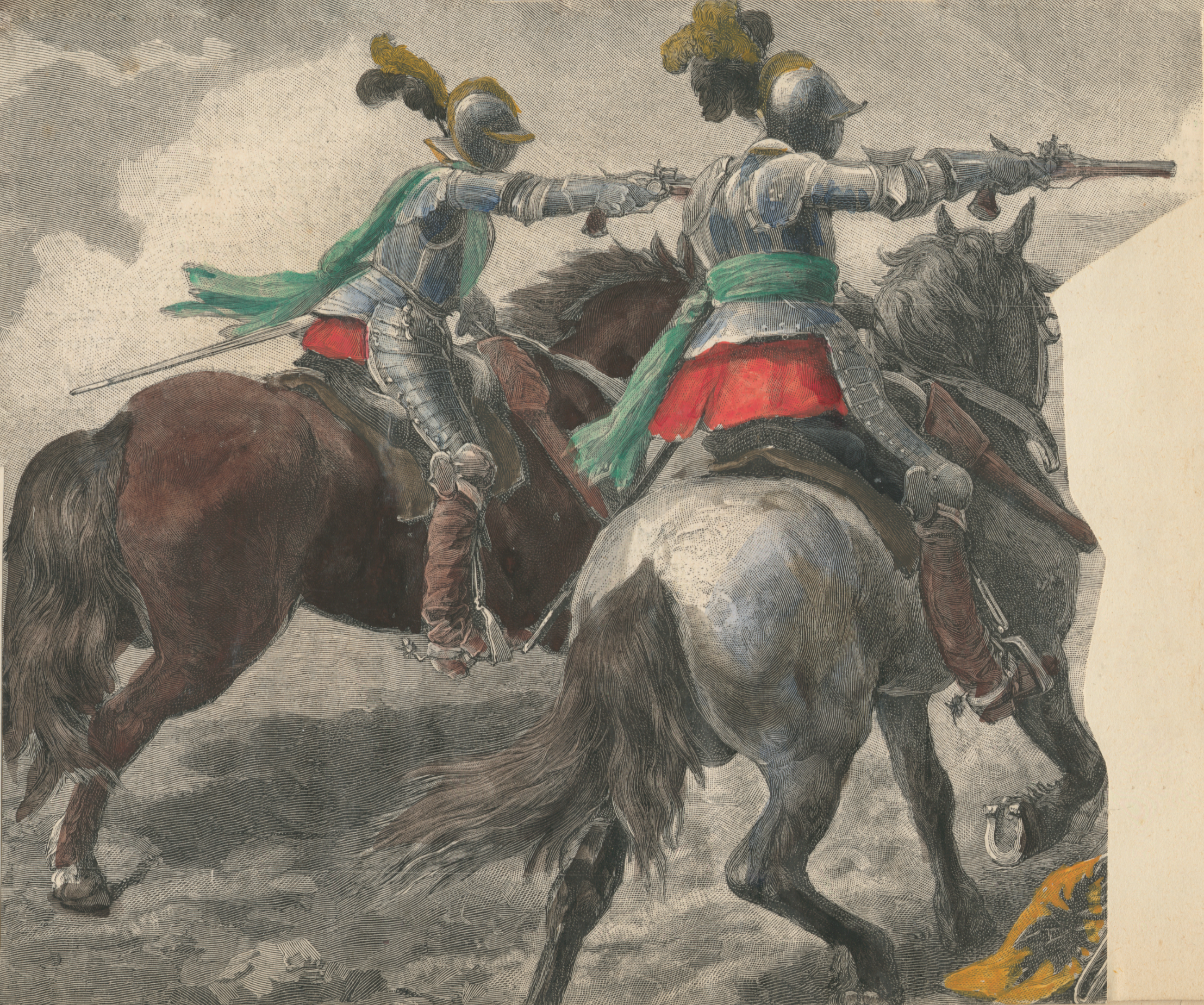
Cuirassiers giving fire with their pistols (cuirassiers of Gottfried Heinrich Graf zu Pappenheim)

The first cuirassiers were similar in appearance to the fully armoured Late Medieval man-at-arms. They wore three-quarter armour that covered the entire upper body as well as the front half of the legs down to the knee. The head was protected by a close helm, burgonet, or lobster-tailed pot helmet, usually worn with a gorget for the neck. The torso was protected by a breast and back plate, sometimes reinforced by a plackart. The arms and shoulders were fully armoured with pauldrons, rerebraces, elbow couters, and vambraces. Armoured gauntlets were often abandoned, particularly for the right hand, as they interfered with the loading of pistols. Long tassets, instead of a combination of short tassets with cuisses, protected the front of the thighs and knees, and riding boots were substituted for lower leg armour (greaves and sabatons). Weapons included a pair of pistols in saddle holsters (these were the primary weapons instead of a lance), a sword, and sometimes a "horseman's pick" (a type of war hammer). By the mid-16th century, barding (horse armour) largely fell into disuse on the battlefield. Therefore, it was more commonly used for ceremonial purposes such as parades or festivals.

The armour of a cuirassier was very expensive; in England, in 1629, a cuirassier's equipment cost four pounds and 10 shillings (equivalent to £1,007.929 in 2025), whilst a harquebusier's (a lighter type of cavalry) was a mere one pound and six shillings (equivalent to £291.179 in 2025).

During the latter half of the 16th century, the heavy "knightly" lance gradually fell out of use perhaps because of the widespread adoption of the infantry pike. Also, the lance required a great amount of practice to perfect its use, whilst proficiency in the use of firearms was considerably more easily acquired. The lancer or demi-lancer, when he had abandoned his lance, became the pistol-armed cuirassier or reiter.

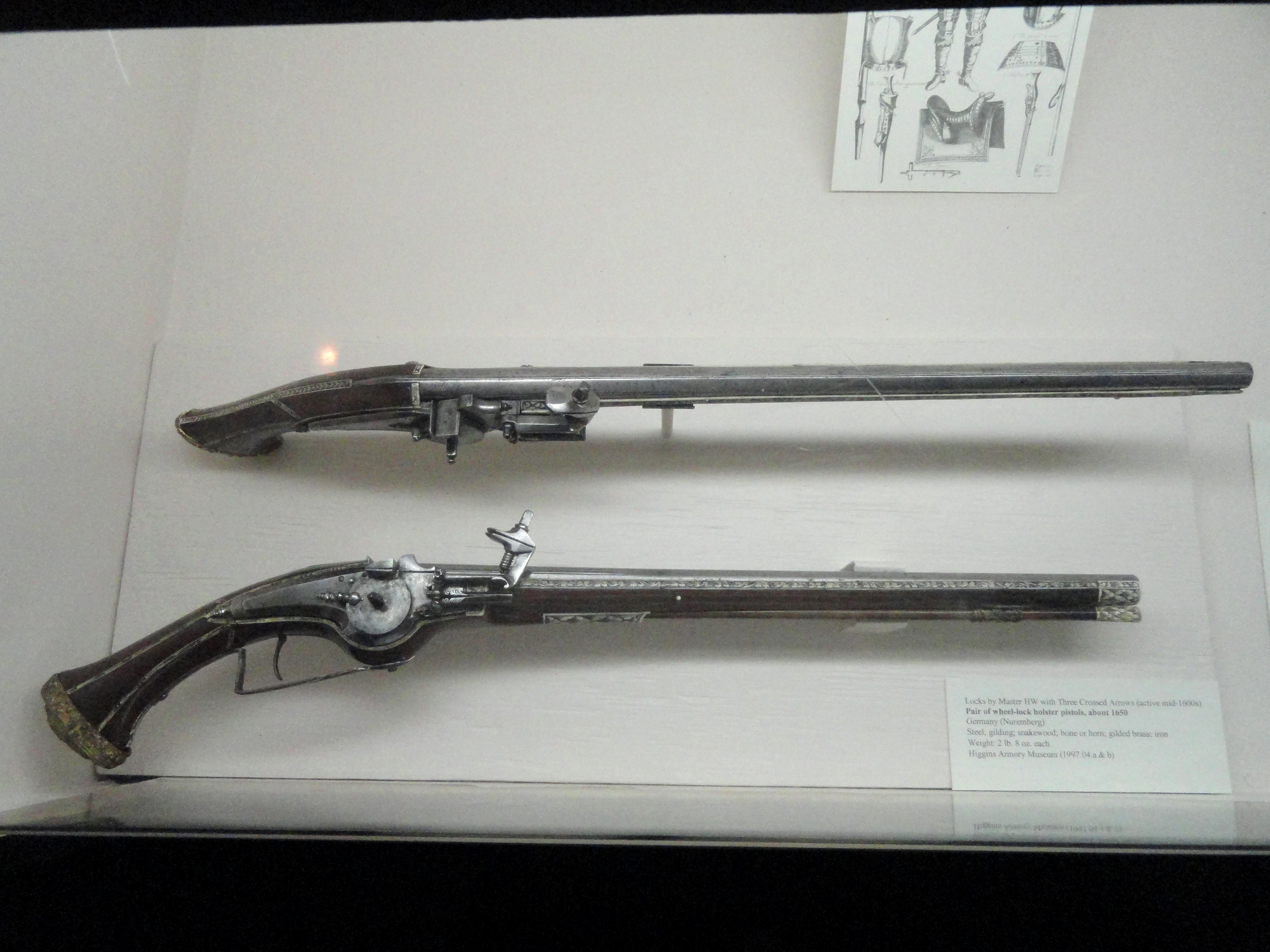
A pair of long-barrelled wheel-lock pistols, the primary weapon of the early cuirassier

The adoption of the pistol as the primary weapon led to the development of the stately caracole tactic, where cuirassiers fired their pistols at the enemy, then retired to reload whilst their comrades advanced in turn to maintain the firing. Following some initial successes, this tactic proved to be extremely ineffective as infantry, with superior firearms and numbers, could easily outgun the cuirassiers. The change from cavalry reliant on firearms to shock-capable close combat cavalry reliant mainly on the sword was often attributed to Gustavus Adolphus of Sweden in the 1620s and early 1630s. Gustavus Adolphus also reduced the number of ranks in a cavalry formation from the previously usual six to ten, for pistol-based tactics, to three to suit his sword-based shock tactics, or as a partial remedy to the frequent numerical inferiority of his cavalry arm.

Only two cuirassier regiments were raised during the English Civil War, the Lifeguard of the Earl of Essex and the 'London lobsters,' though individuals within other regiments did serve in full armour. With the refinement of infantry firearms, especially the introduction of the powerful musket, the usefulness of the protection afforded by full armour became greatly lessened. By the mid-17th century, the fully armoured cuirassier was becoming increasingly anachronistic. "It will kill a man to serve in a whole cuirass" commented a late 17th century observer. The cuirassier lost his limb armour and entered the 18th century with just the breast and backplate.

== 18th and 19th centuries ==
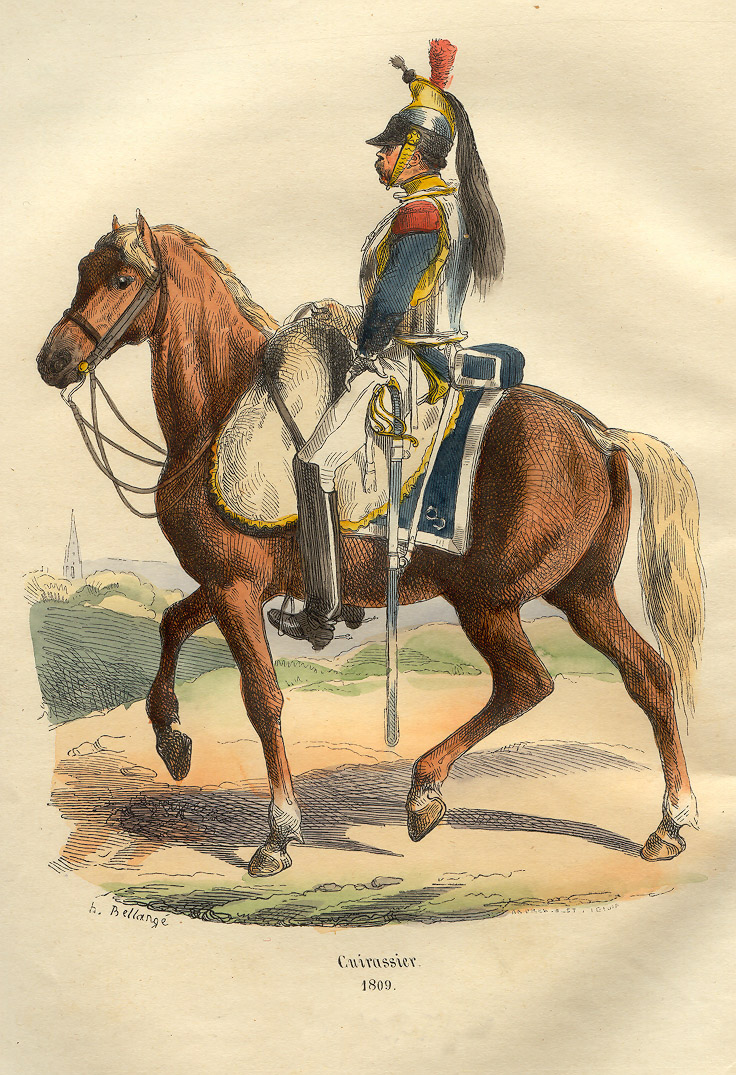
French cuirassier in 1809

Body armour was restricted to a cuirass, which fell in and out of use during the 18th century; for example British cavalry entered the War of the Spanish Succession without body armour, although they readopted it during the conflict. Cuirassiers played a prominent role in the armies of Austria, and of Frederick the Great of Prussia. By the time of the French Revolutionary Wars, few heavy cavalry regiments, except those of Austria, wore the cuirass on campaign. The twelve Austrian cuirassier regiments in existence between 1768 and 1802 (when the number was reduced) unusually wore only a front plate. This reduced the burden of the weight carried by the individual trooper, but left his back unprotected during a swirling cavalry melee.

Most heavy cavalry from c. 1700 to c. 1785 wore the tricorne hat, which evolved into the bicorne, or cocked hat, towards the close of the century. In the first two decades of the 19th century, helmets, often of hardened leather with brass reinforcement (though the French used iron-skulled helmets for their cuirassiers), replaced the bicorne hat.

A resurgence of armoured cavalry took place in France under the rule of Napoleon Bonaparte, who increased the number of armoured regiments from one to, ultimately, sixteen (fourteen cuirassier regiments plus two Carabiniers-à-Cheval regiments).

During the first few decades of the 19th century most of the major states of Europe, except Austria which had retained its armoured cavalry, readopted the cuirass for some of their heavy cavalry in emulation of the French. The Russians fielded two divisions of armoured cavalry, but most other states armoured a few senior regiments: Prussia three regiments, the Kingdom of Saxony three, the Kingdom of Westphalia two, Spain one (Coraceros Españoles) and the Duchy of Warsaw one. The British Army's Household Cavalry regiments (comprising the 1st and 2nd Life Guards and Royal Horse Guards) adopted cuirasses shortly after the Napoleonic Wars as a part of their full dress uniforms, but never had occasion to wear the armour in battle. However as late as 1887 these regiments were still wearing cuirasses on maneuvers in "field day order".

Cuirassiers were generally the senior branch of the mounted portion of an army, retaining their status as heavy cavalry—"big men on big horses". Their value as a heavy striking force during the Napoleonic Wars ensured that the French, Russian, and Prussian armies continued to use cuirassier regiments throughout the 19th century. The Austrian cuirassiers were abolished in 1868.

For the reasons of both climate and cost, cuirassiers of the 19th century type seldom appeared outside of Europe and Latin America. However Ranjit Singh's Sikh Army (the Khalsa) of the 1830s included two regiments of cuirassiers equipped and armed in French fashion. Four hundred carabinier cuirasses were imported from France while helmets and uniforms were manufactured in Wazirabad.

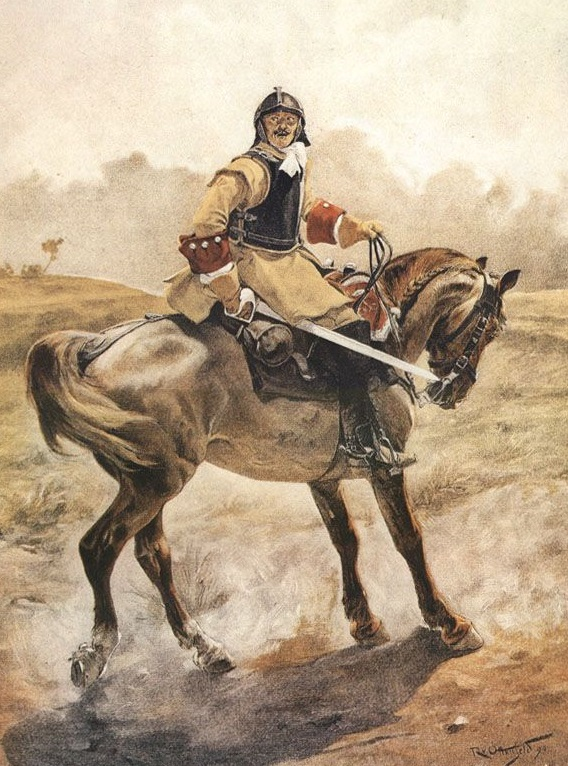
An Austrian cuirassier from 1705

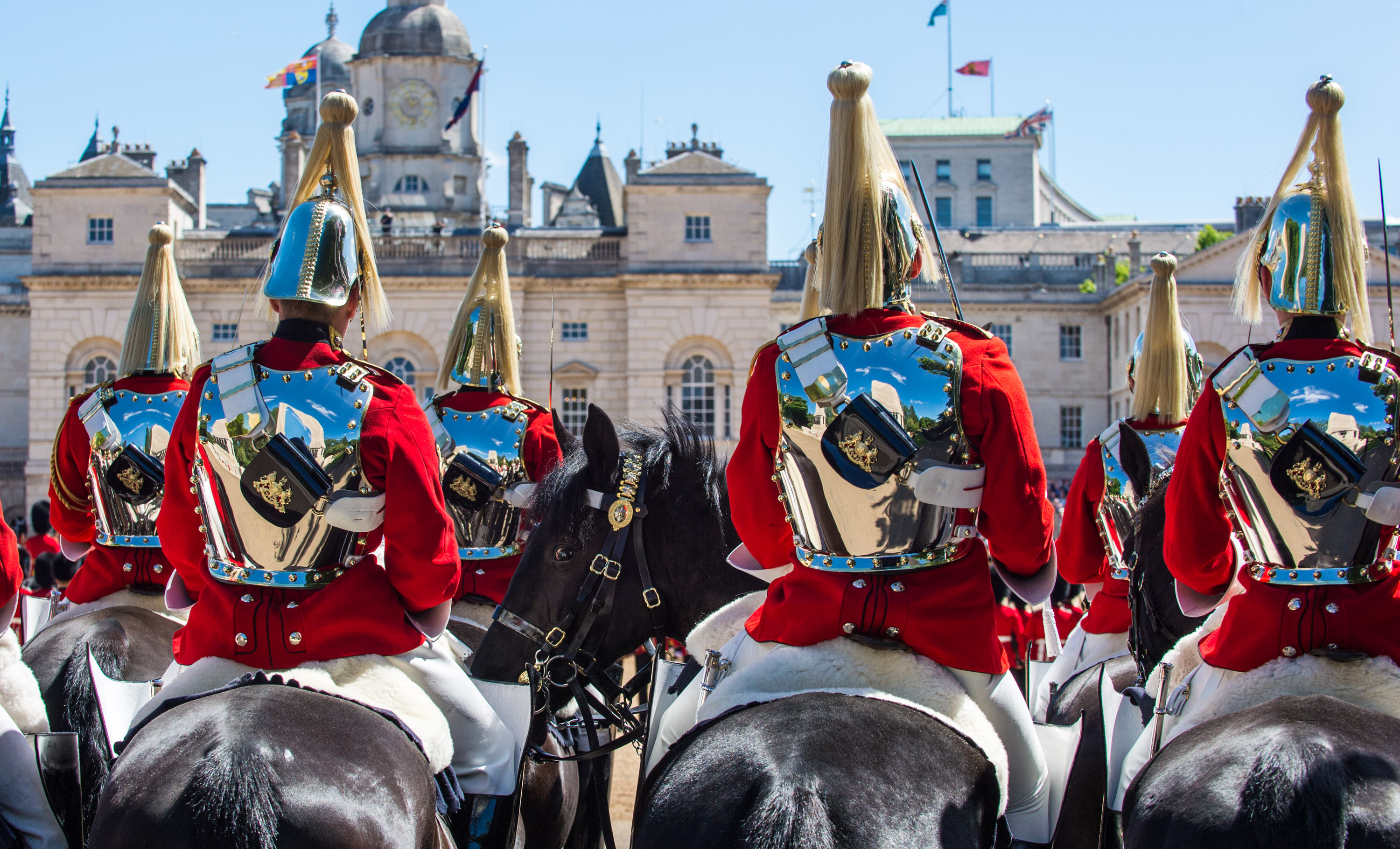
The Household Cavalry Mounted Regiment of the British Army in 2017. The steel cuirass was adopted in the 1820's.

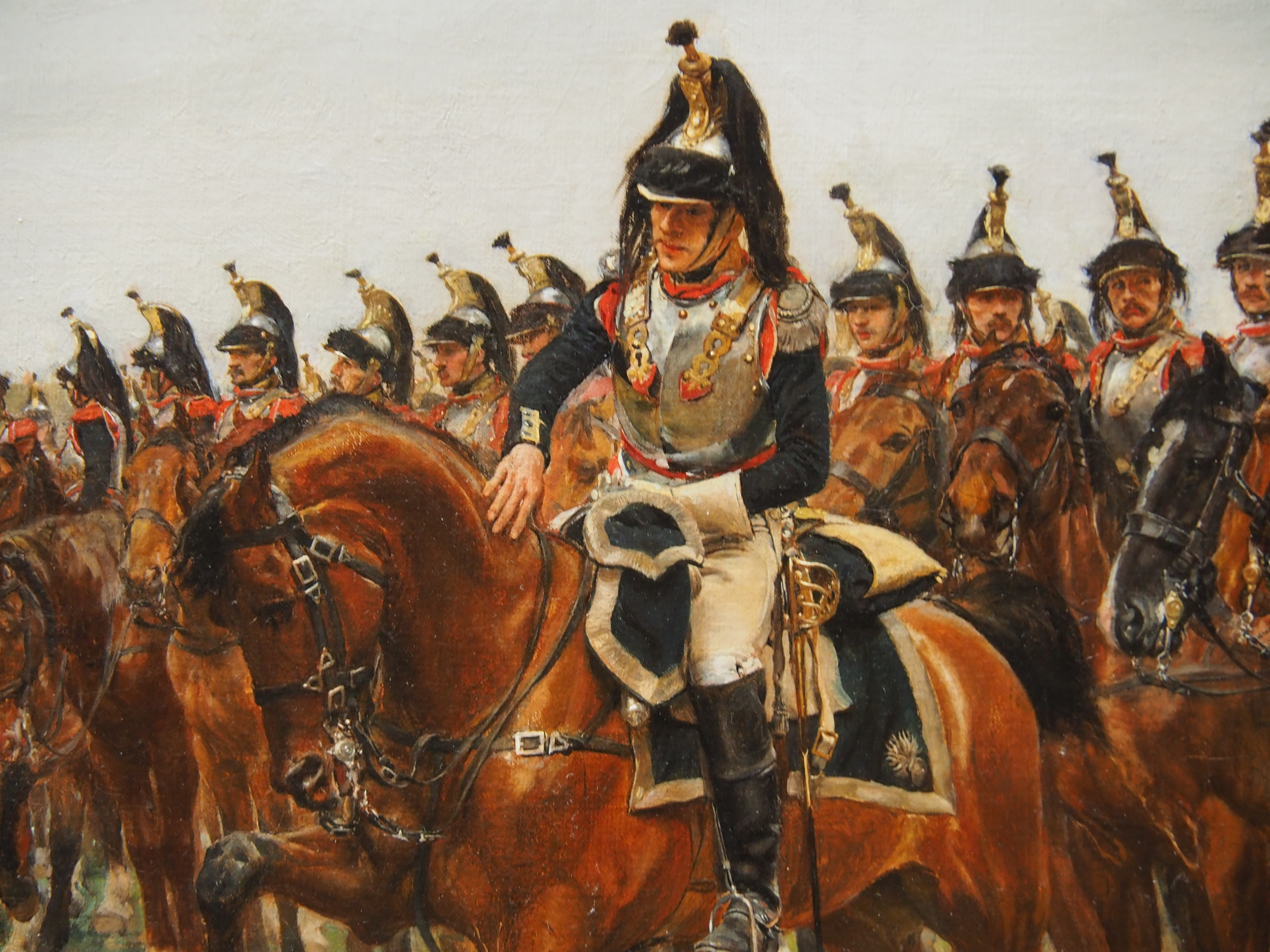
Detail from the painting 1805, Cuirassiers Before the Charge, by Ernest Meissonier

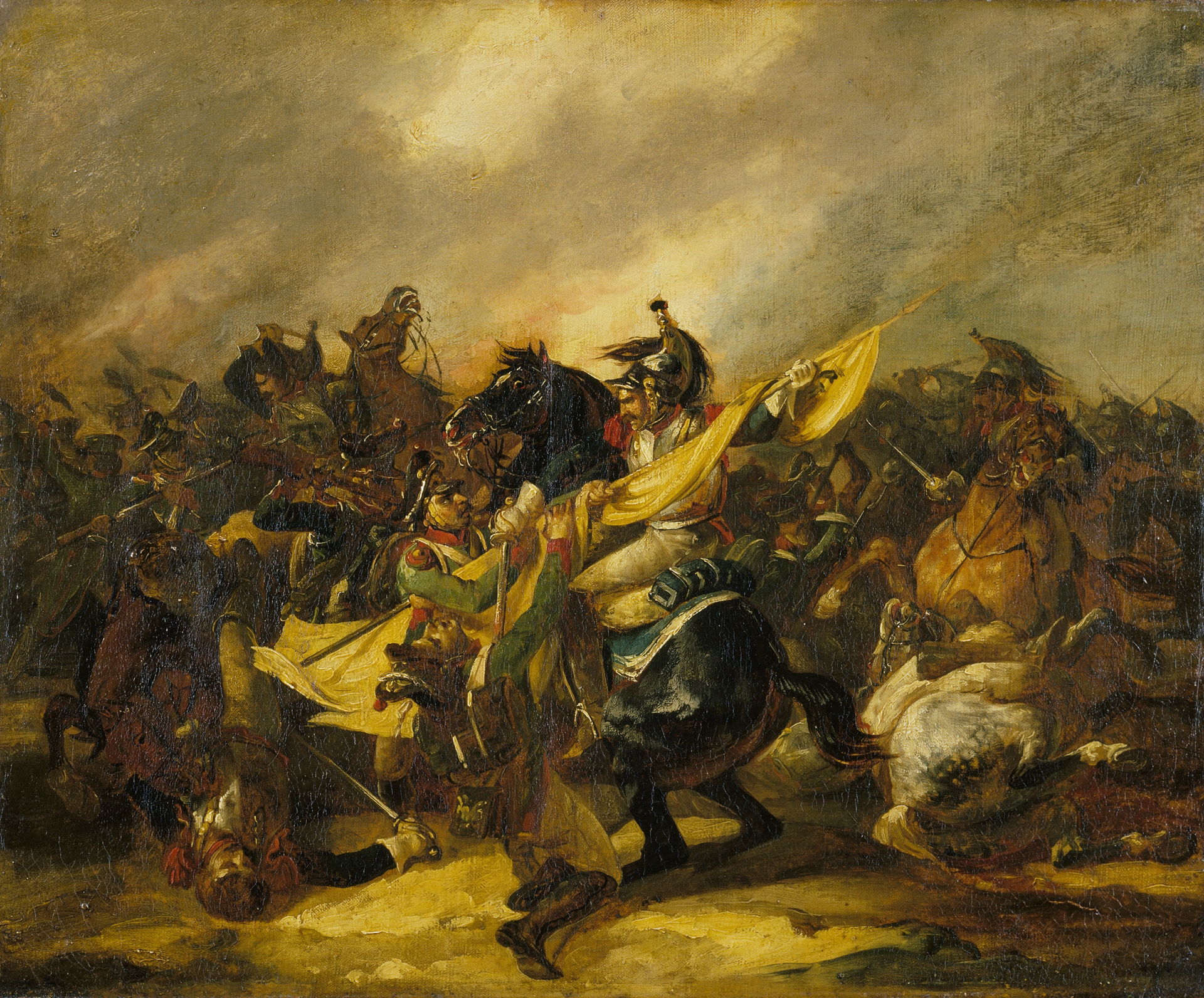
A Charge of Cuirassiers by Théodore Géricault

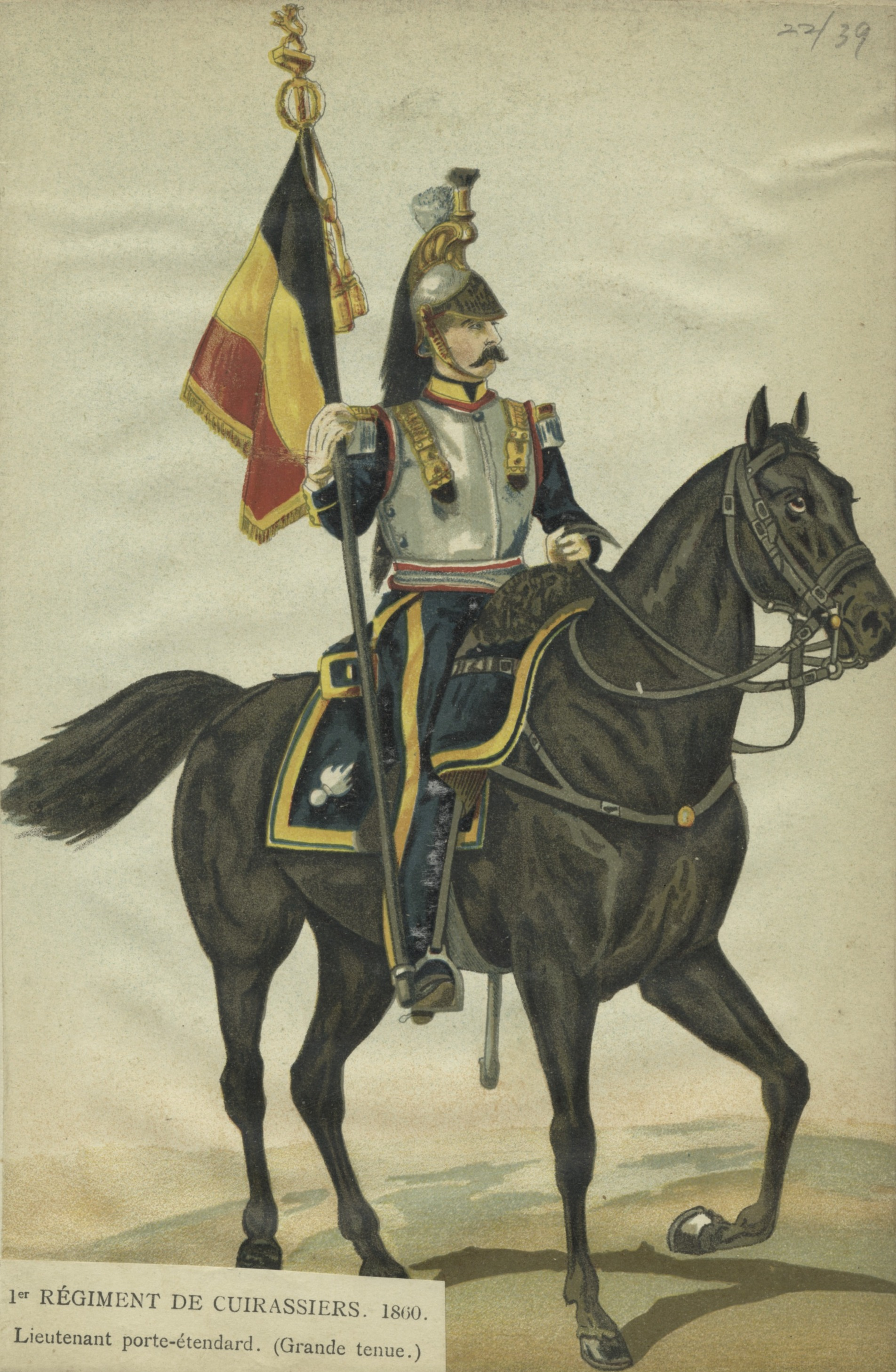
Lieutenant of the Belgian Army's 1st Cuirassiers Regiment, 1860.

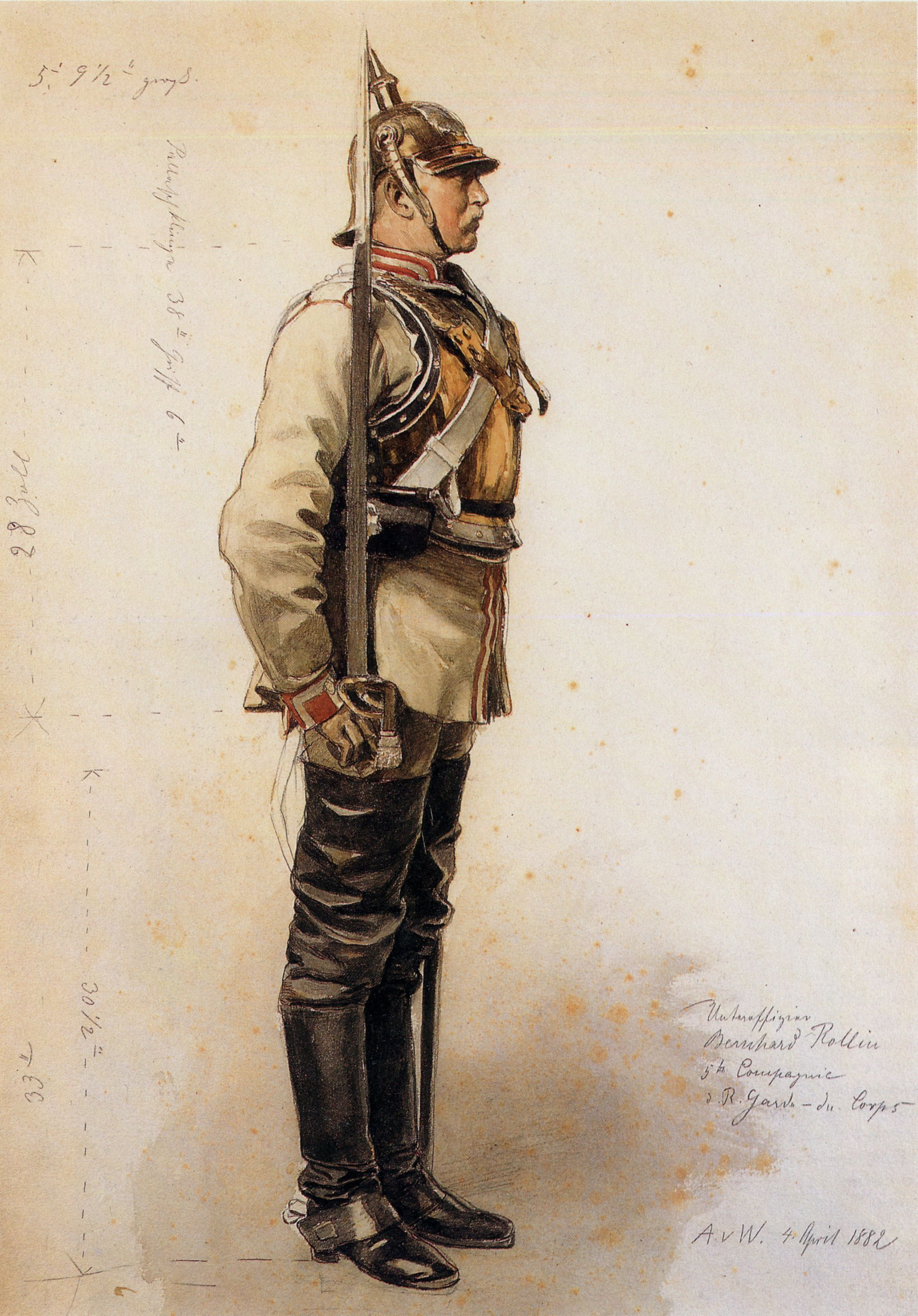
Prussian Garde du Corps cuirassier during the Franco-Prussian War.

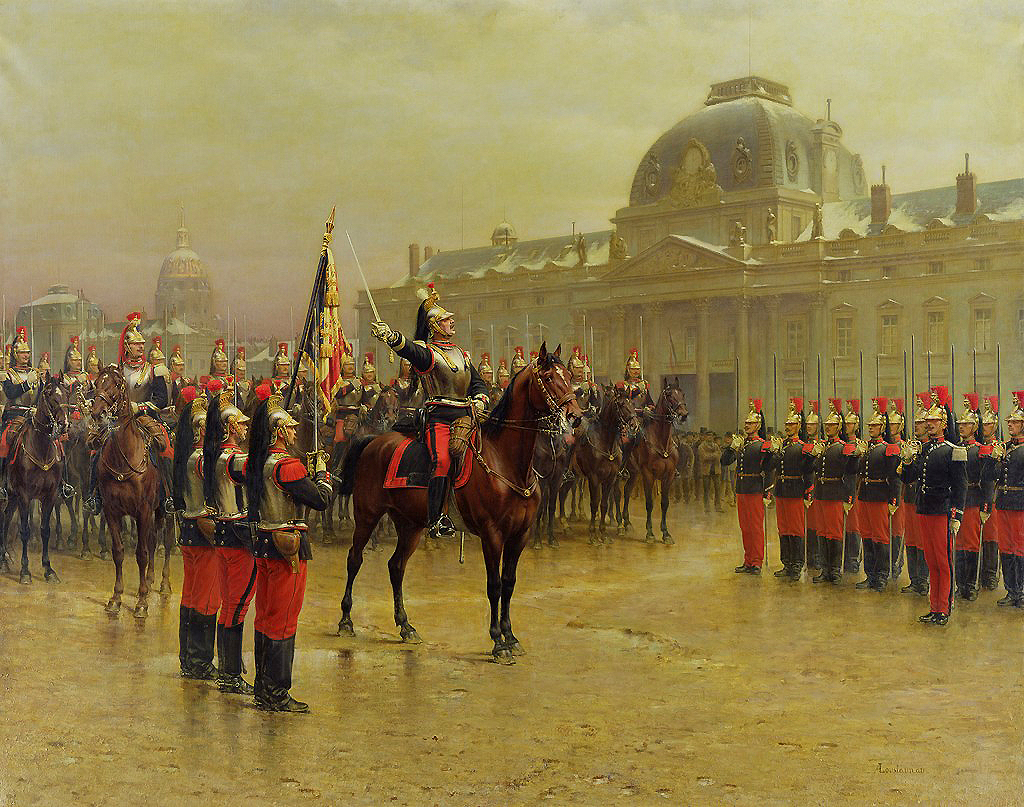
French 6th Cuirassier Regiment in 1887.

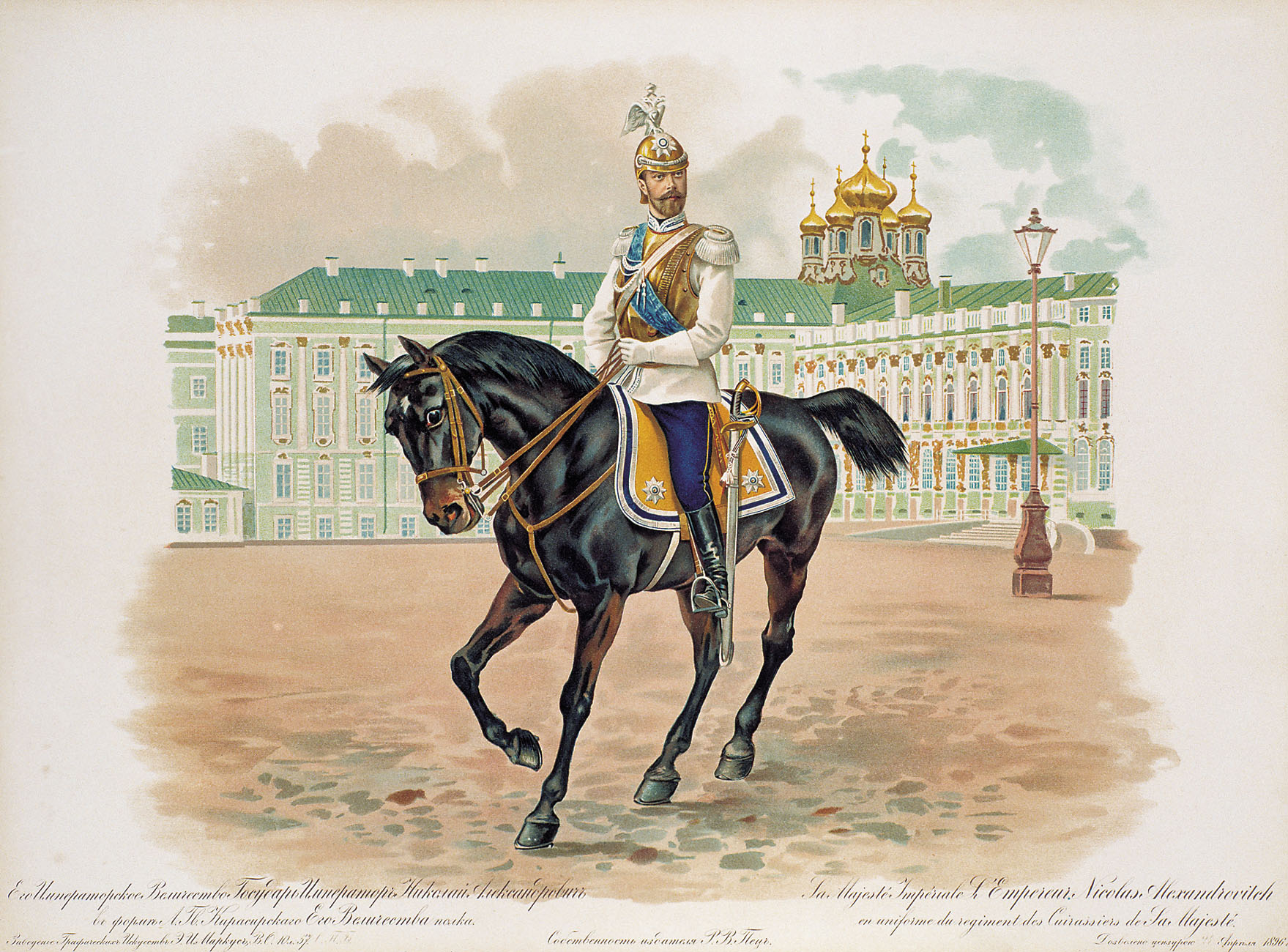
Nicholas II of Russia in the uniform of His Majesty's Cuirassier Guards Regiment, 1896

== Effectiveness during the Napoleonic Wars ==
Though the armour could not protect against contemporary flintlock musket fire, it could deflect shots fired from long range, stop ricochets, and offer protection from all but very close-range pistol fire. More importantly, in an age which saw cavalry used in large numbers, the breastplates (along with the helmets) provided excellent protection against the swords and lances of opposing cavalry and infantry equipped with bayonets, and, on a much smaller scale, polearms (including sergeants equipped with spontoons and halberds). It also had some psychological effect for the wearer (effectively making the cuirassier more willing to plunge into the thick of fighting) and the enemy (adding intimidation), while it also added weight to a charge, especially in cavalry versus cavalry actions.

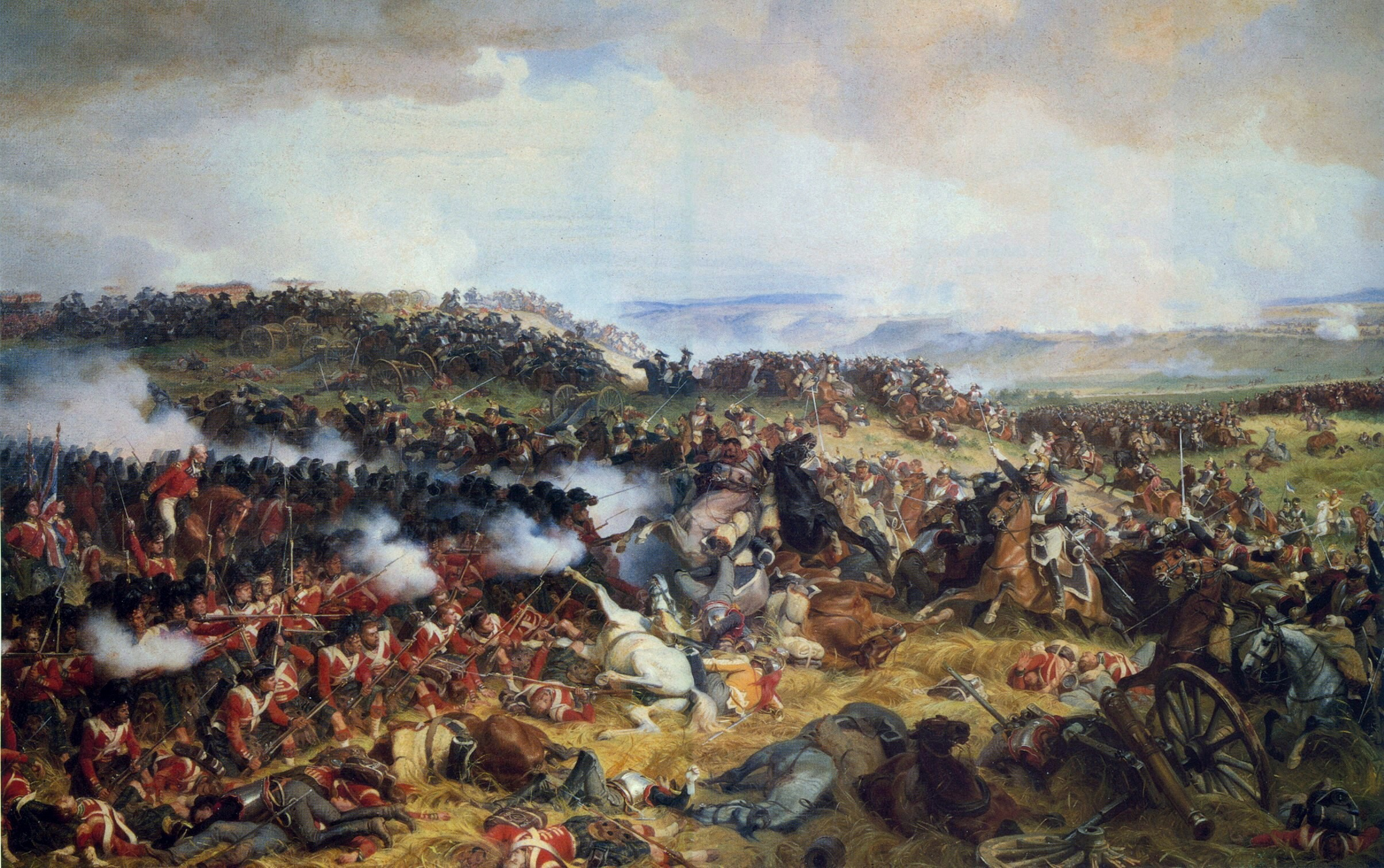
The charge of the French cuirassiers at the Battle of Waterloo against a British infantry square

Napoleonic French cuirasses were originally intended to be proof against three musket shots at close range; however, this was never achieved in practice. The regulations eventually recognised this, and cuirasses were subsequently only expected to be proof against one shot at long range.

The utility of this armour was sometimes disputed. Prussian cuirassiers had abandoned the armoured cuirass before the Napoleonic Wars, but were reissued with it in 1814. During this period, a single British cavalry regiment (Royal Horse Guards) wore cuirasses during the Netherlands campaign of 1794, using breastplates taken from store. The Austrian cuirassiers traded protection for mobility by wearing only the half-cuirass (without back plate) and helmet. Napoleon believed it sufficiently useful that he had cuirassier-style armour issued to his two carabinier regiments after the Battle of Wagram. The Russians, having abandoned Austrian-style half-cuirasses in 1801, reissued full cuirasses in 1812 for all Army and Guard cuirassier regiments, with troops receiving them during the summer 1812 and wearing cuirasses at Borodino. After the Battle of Tarutino the Pskov dragoon regiment received captured French cuirasses and was officially upgraded to a cuirassier regiment. Despite being metallurgically more advanced than the plate armour of old, the Napoleonic era cuirass was still quite cumbersome and hot to wear in warm weather; however, the added protection that it gave to the wearer and the imposing appearance of an armoured cavalryman were factors favouring its retention.

== Franco-Prussian War ==
The last occasions when cuirassiers played a major tactical role as shock cavalry wearing traditional armour was during the Franco-Prussian War (1870–1871). The French cuirassiers numbered 11 regiments at the outbreak of war but had not seen active service since the Battle of Waterloo. A brigade comprising the 6th and 9th Regiments had served in the Crimean War but had not actually encountered the enemy. Accordingly, the prospect of action against the Prussian Army, which included 10 cuirassier regiments of its own, was seen as an opportunity for a strongly traditional branch of the French cavalry to prove its continuing relevance. In the event, in a series of massed charges against Prussian infantry and artillery at Froeschwiller and Rezonville, the French cuirassiers suffered very heavy losses for little return.

== 19th and 20th centuries ==
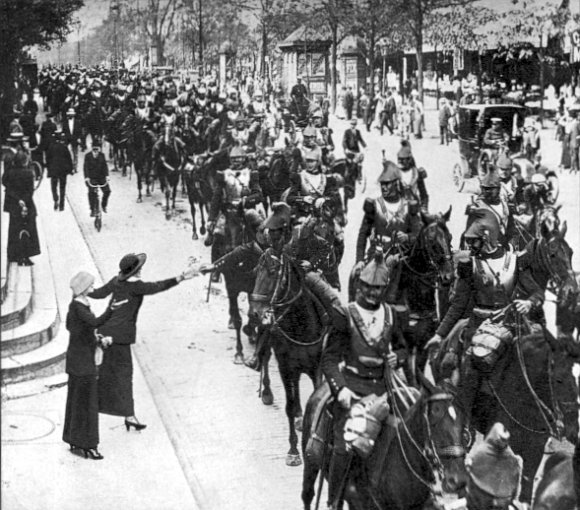
French cuirassiers in Paris, August 1914. These regiments wore cloth-covered cuirasses and helmets during the early months of World War I.

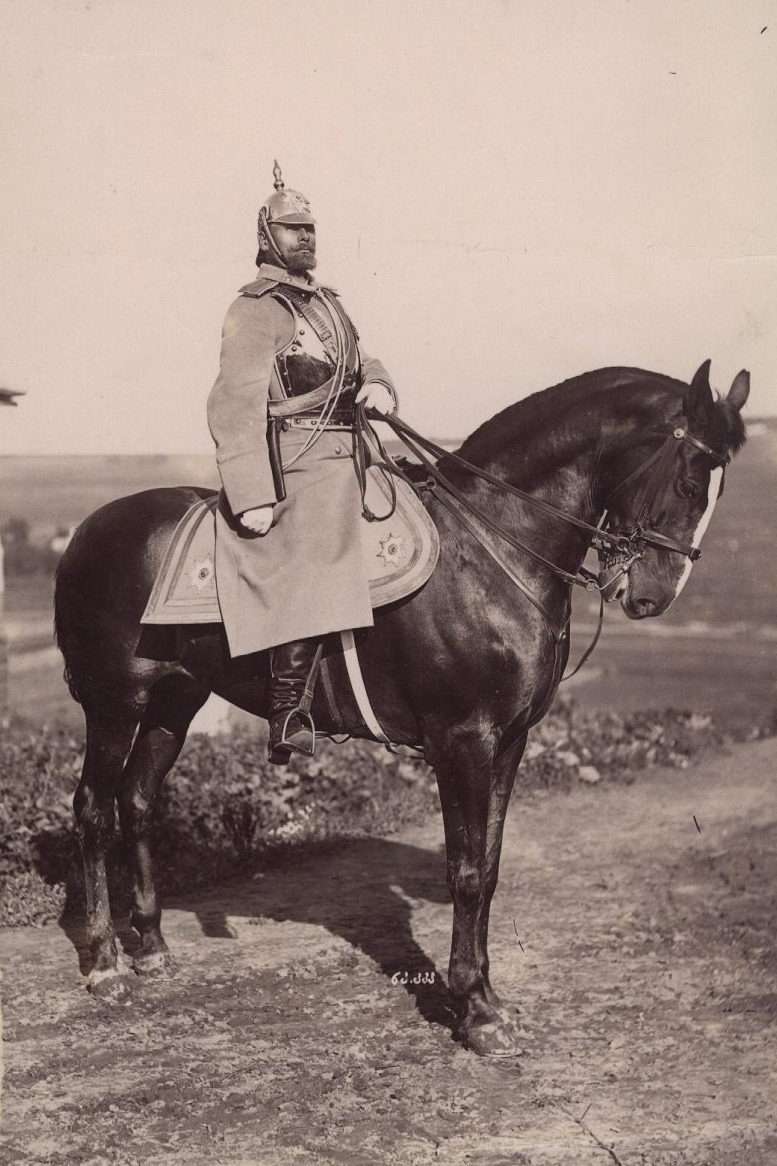
Captain of Her Majesty's Lifeguard Cuirassier Regiment in winter uniform. Krasnoe Selo, Russian Empire, 1892.

In 1914, the German Army still retained cuirassiers (ten regiments including the Gardes du Corps and the Guards Cuirassiers); as did the French (twelve regiments) and the Russian (four regiments, all of the Imperial Guard) armies. The Austrians had dispensed with breastplates in 1860 and formally abolished the twelve Kuirassier regiments as the heavy cavalry branch of their army in 1868. Influenced by the French example, the Belgian Army created two regiments of cuirassiers in 1830 and then for reasons of economy converted both to lancers in 1863.

By the end of the 19th century, the German and Russian cuirassiers used the breastplates only as part of their peacetime parade dress, but the French regiments still wore the cuirass and plumed helmet (both with cloth covers) on active service during the first few weeks of World War I. Amongst ceremonial units the Spanish Escolta Real (Royal Escort) Squadron, the Argentinian Presidential Bodyguard, and the Italian Cuirassier (Corazzieri) Corps all wore cuirasses as part of their mounted full dress in the early 20th century.

The retention of cuirasses as part of their field uniform by the French Army in 1914 reflected the historic prestige of this branch of the cavalry, dating back through the Franco-Prussian War to the campaigns of the Napoleonic Wars. Before the war, it had been argued within the army that the cuirass should be limited to parade dress, but upon mobilisation in 1914 the only concession made to active service was the addition of a cover of brown or blue cloth over the shining steel and brass of the metal equipment to make the wearer less visible. Within a few weeks, most French regiments stopped wearing the cuirass, as it served no real purpose in this new war. It was not however formally withdrawn until October 1915.

The Russian and German cuirassiers ceased to exist when the Imperial armies in both countries were disbanded, respectively in 1917 and in 1918. The French cuirassiers continued in existence after World War I, although without their traditional armour and reduced in numbers to only the six regiments that had been most decorated during the war. Five of these units had achieved their distinctions serving as "cuirassiers à pied" or dismounted cavalry in the trenches. The surviving cuirassier regiments were amongst the first mounted cavalry in the French Army to be mechanised during the 1930s. One cuirassier regiment still forms part of the French Army in the modern day.

== Cuirassiers today ==
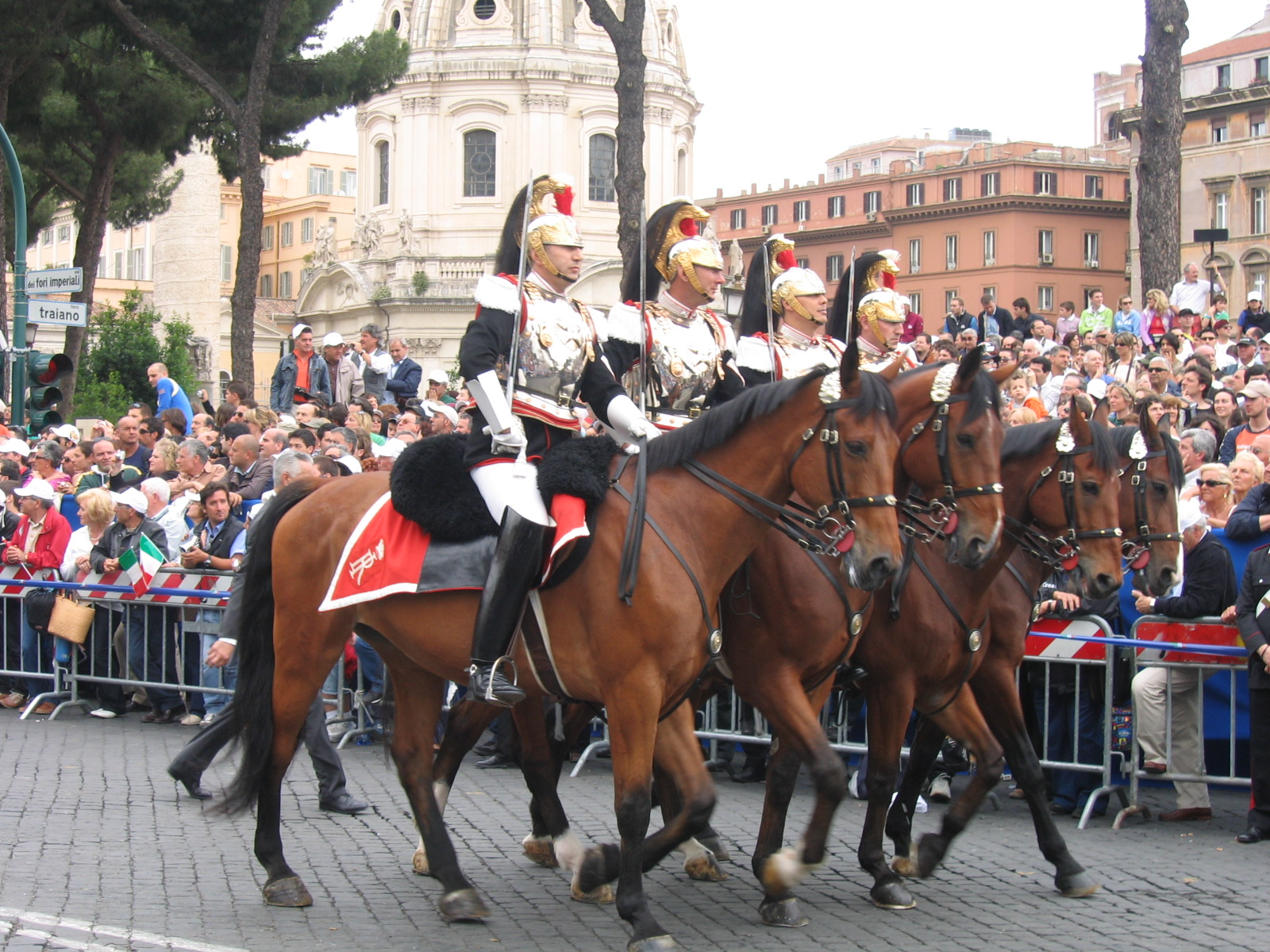
Italian corazzieri during a public event, 2006

- The French army maintains one historic cuirassier regiment as a mechanised armoured unit: the 12e Régiment de Cuirassiers based at Olivet.
- The Italian army maintains the Cuirassiers' Regiment (Italian: Reggimento Corazzieri) as the honour guard of the President of the Italian Republic. They are part of the Carabinieri.
- The Spanish army maintains a cavalry detachment as part of the Spanish Royal Guard, who wear cuirasses and are sometimes known as cuirassiers (Spanish: Coraceros). Their proper title is Royal Escort Squadron (Escuadrón de Escolta Real).
- The British army maintains cuirassiers through the Household Cavalry, they wear cuirasses as part of their parade equipment on formal occasions but were never formally designated as cuirassiers, instead retaining the titles Lifeguards and Horse Guards.
- The Chilean army maintains an armored brigade which uses the title 1st Cuirassiers Armored Brigade.
- The Argentine army maintains the 7th Tank Cavalry, which also uses the title of Colonel Ramon Estomba's "Cuirassiers" . In addition the 4th Reconnaissance Cavalry Regiment (Mountain) retains the title of Coraceros General Lavalle (General Lavalle's Cuirassiers). This latter regiment maintains a mounted fanfare and ceremonial escort in the Argentine cuirassier uniform of 1910, although the body armor of that period is no longer worn.

== Cuirassier harness evolution ==
The development of firearms, which reduced the effectiveness of expensive heavy armour, led to a considerable reduction of the size and complexity of the latter. This form of protection was reduced in the latter half of the 17th century to the breastplate and the helmet, both of which eventually became largely decorative against projectiles but still retained their effectiveness against swords, lances, bayonets, and other edged weapons.

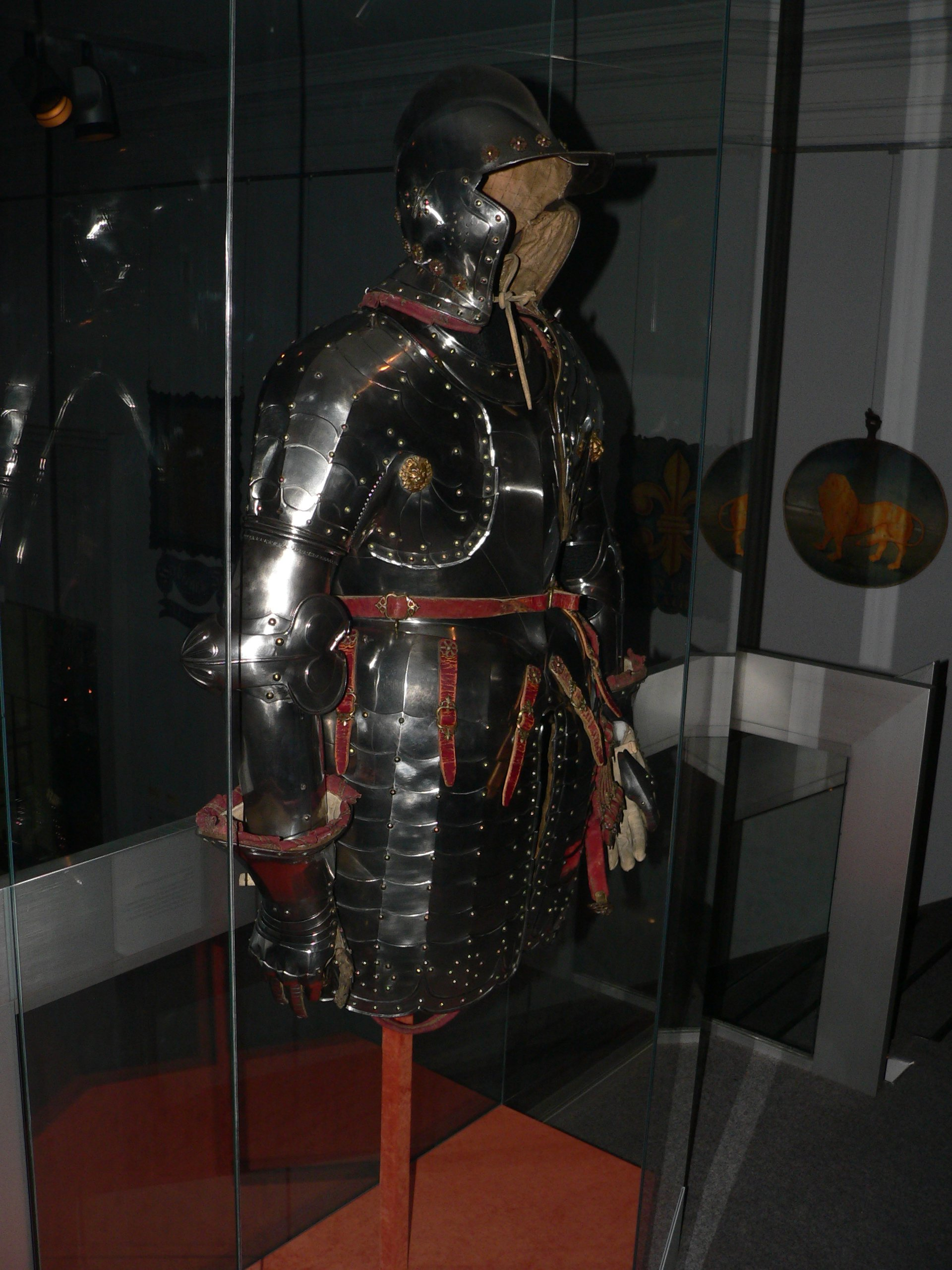
Cuirassier (16th century)

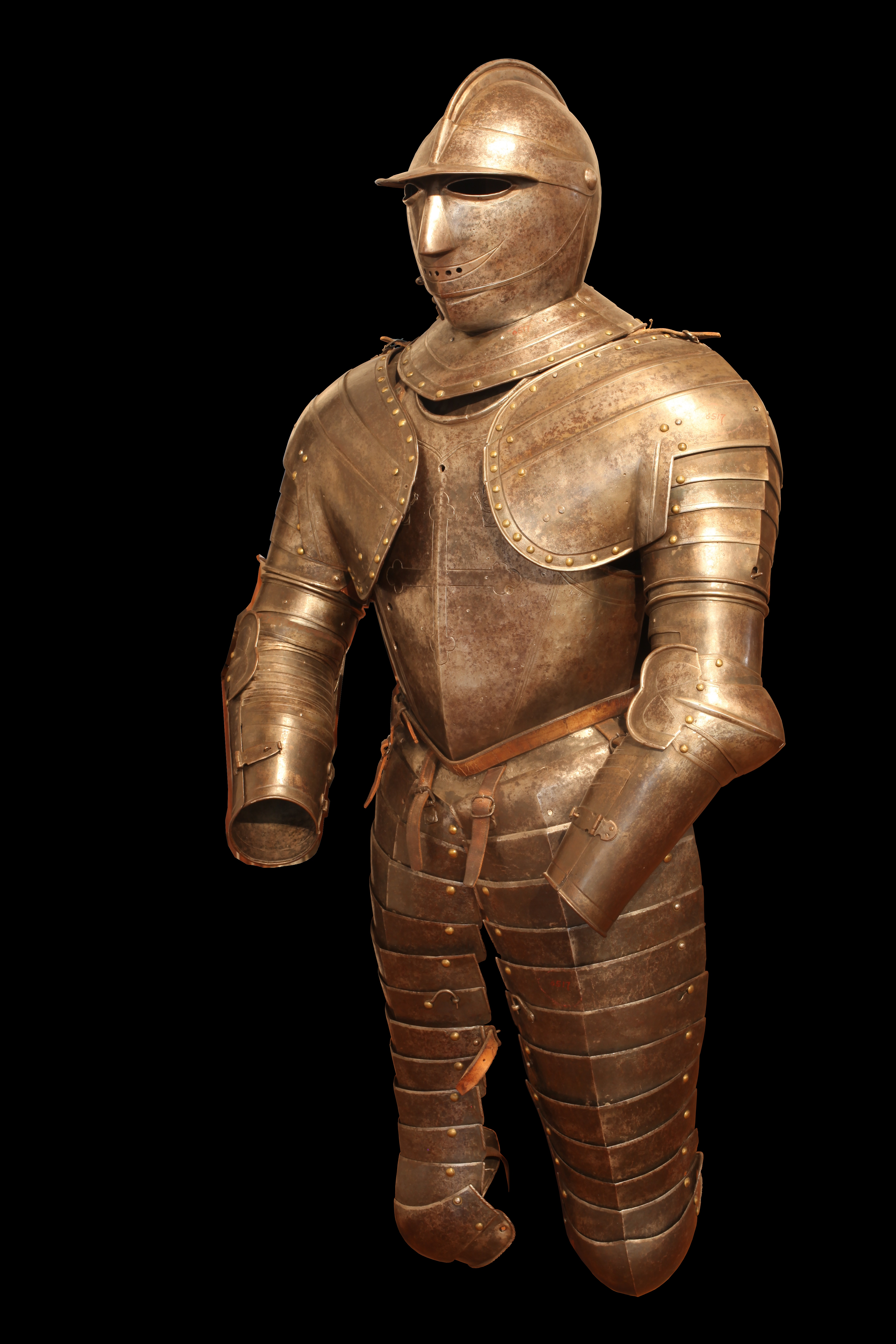
Three-quarter armour (early 17th century)

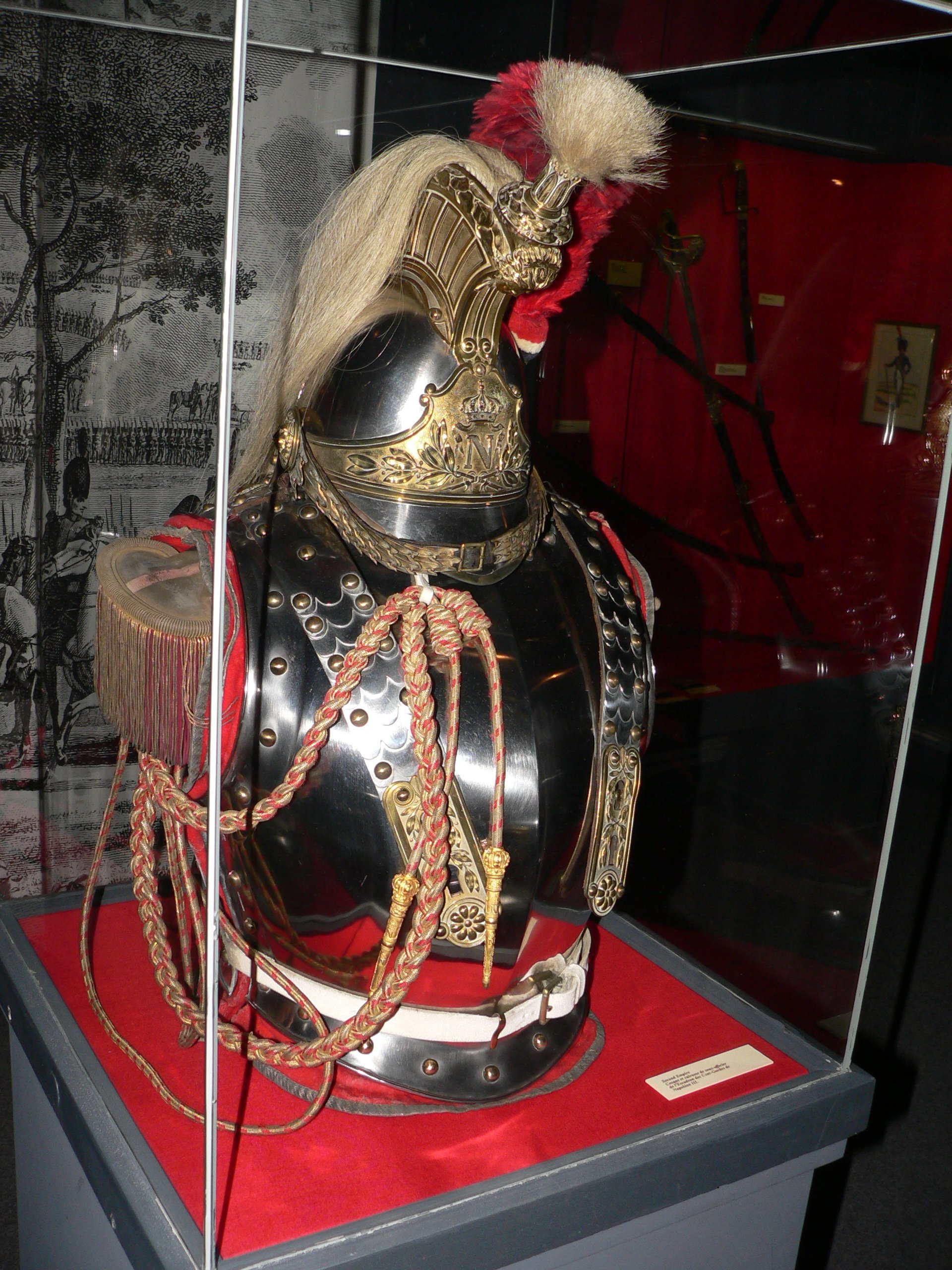
French Cent-garde breastplate (19th century)

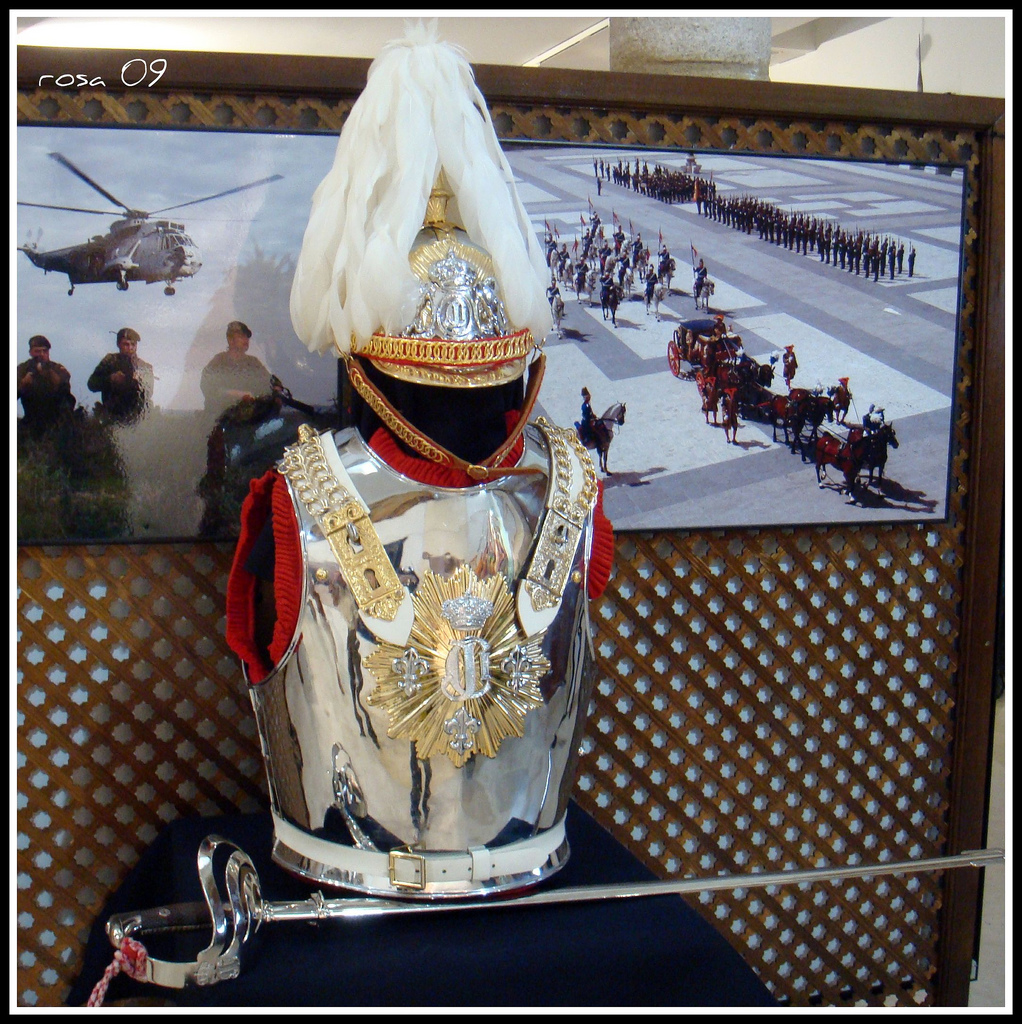
Ceremonial cuirass of the Spanish Escuadrón de Escolta Real (20th century)

== See also ==
- Hussar
