= Charles Négrier =

French doctor

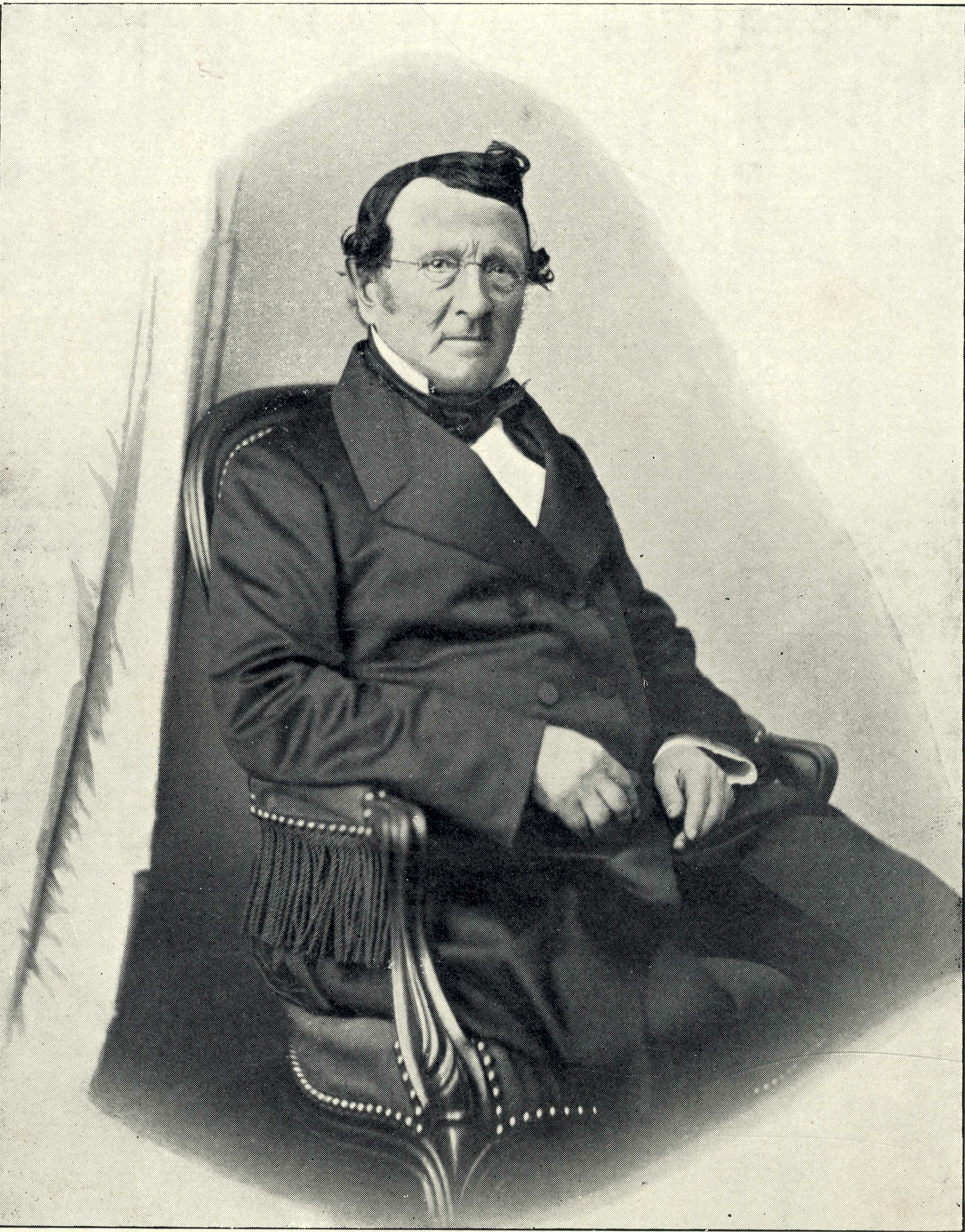

Charles Négrier (July 14, 1792 in Angers – January 31, 1862 in Angers), was a French medical doctor. He began his career in the military and later became a corresponding member of the Académie nationale de médecine and of the Societies of Angers and Nantes.

He is, with Félix Archimède Pouchet, one of the first two researchers to have scientifically described the mechanism of ovulation in the human species and in other mammals.

== Biography ==
Charles Négrier, son of the doctor Jacques Négrier, was born in Angers on July 14, 1792. He began in 1810 to study medicine in Paris when he was called up for military service during the Napoleonic Wars and for five years practiced medicine in the Imperial army. At the age of 19 he received a third class surgeon's commission at the hospitals of Belle-Île-en-Mer. After six months, he passed with the same rank to the 82e Regiment of Infantry, which was then garrisoned in Portugal. Thereafter, on June 22, 1813, he was assigned to the 3rd Regiment of Guards of Honor, with which in 1813 he carried out the German campaign of 1813 and in 1814 the French campaign. On May 17, 1815, during the Hundred Days, he was attached as an aide-major to the 6th Light Cavalry Lancers Regiment. This regiment took part in the Belgian campaign and fought in the Battle of Ligny and Battle of Waterloo. Like the whole Imperial army, he was dismissed on July 16, 1815, during the Second Restoration.

Released from the army, Charles Négrier returned to study medicine in Paris. On February 2, 1817, he took the rank of doctor, and returned to settle in Angers, where he married on February 28, 1821, Rose Adèle Clarisse Saillard, born in Nantes. In 1827 he was appointed assistant to the childbirth course given by fr:Michel Chevreul at the École secondaire de Médecine et de pharmacie (Secondary School of Medicine and Pharmacy) in Angers.

Charles Négrier succeeded Michel Chevreul as holder of the course on April 20, 1838. In 1845, he was called to the very direction of the Secondary School of Medicine and Pharmacy of Angers. This charge remained entrusted to him by two successive renewals in 1850 and 1854.

In September 1859, he lost his eldest daughter. After two years of insanity, he died on January 31, 1862, at the age of 69.

Charles Négrier published widely and was a much appreciated administrator and teacher.

== Awards and recognition ==
In 1846, the Royal Academy of Medicine awarded Charles Négrier the title of correspondent. In 1859 the French Academy of Sciences awarded him one of the Monthyon prizes for his studies on the ovaries.

Since April 8, 1881, a street in Angers, in the district of Doutre Saint-Jacques Nazareth, bears the name of Négrier. It begins on Boulevard Daviers and ends on Place de la Paix.

== Publications ==
- Recherches anatomiques et physiologiques sur les ovaires dans l'espèce humaine, considérés spécialement sous le rapport de leur influence dans la menstruation par C. Négrier,... ; avec onze planches lithographiées par M. Beau, d'après les dessins de M. Lebiez, Paris : Béchet Je. and Labé, Paris 1840, 1 vol. (XIX-131-11 p.-XIX f. de pl.); in-8.
- Recherches et considérations sur la constitution et les fonctions du col de l'utérus, dans le but d'éclairer l'étiologie des insertions placentaires sur cette région, et de conduire à un choix de moyens propres à combattre les hémorrhagies qui en sont les conséquences, par C. Négrier,..., Imprimerie de Cosnier et Lachèse, Angers 1846, In-8°, 172 p.

== Bibliography ==
- Célestin Port, Dictionnaire historique, géographique et biographique de Maine-et-Loire, Paris, 1878, art. Négrier (Charles), online.
