= 6th Cuirassier Regiment (France) =

- 6e régiment de cuirassiers
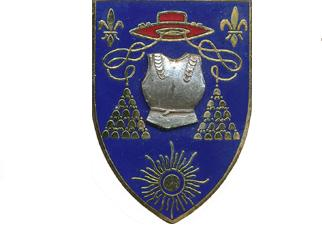
- Unit insignia
- Active: 1635 - 2009
- Country: France
- Branch: Heavy Cavalry
- Engagements: French Revolutionary Wars; Napoleonic Wars; World War I World War II: Battle of France; Cold War

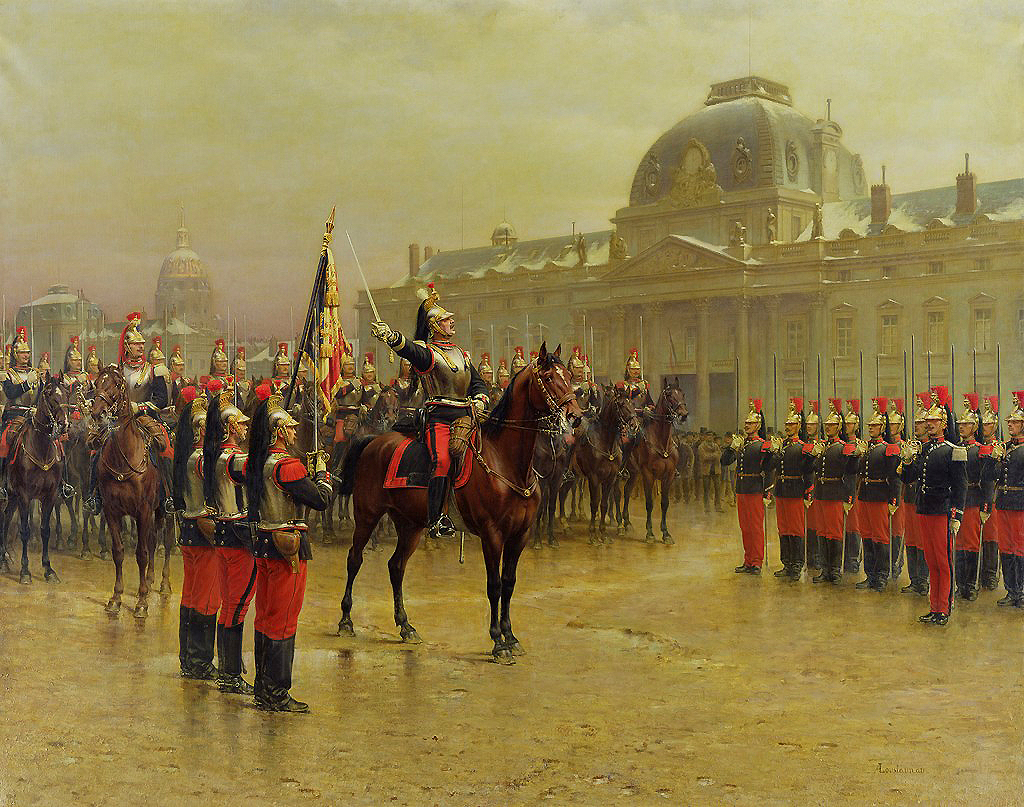
Colonel de la Rochetulon presenting to the recruits the flag of the 6th regiment of cuirassiers in front of the Ecole Militaire of Paris in 1887

The 6th Cuirassier Regiment (French: 6e Régiment de Cuirassiers,6e RC) was an ancient French cavalry regiment. It has since merged with the 12th Cuirassier Regiment to form the 6th-12th Cuirassier Regiment.

== The French Royal Army ==
1635: The regiment was raised by Cardinal Richelieu as the Régiment de Dragons du Cardinal. In 1638, it was renamed the Régiment de Fusiliers à Cheval de Son Éminence. In 1643, it became the Régiment de Fusiliers à Cheval du Roi, and in 1646 it was renamed the Régiment du Roi-Cavalerie.

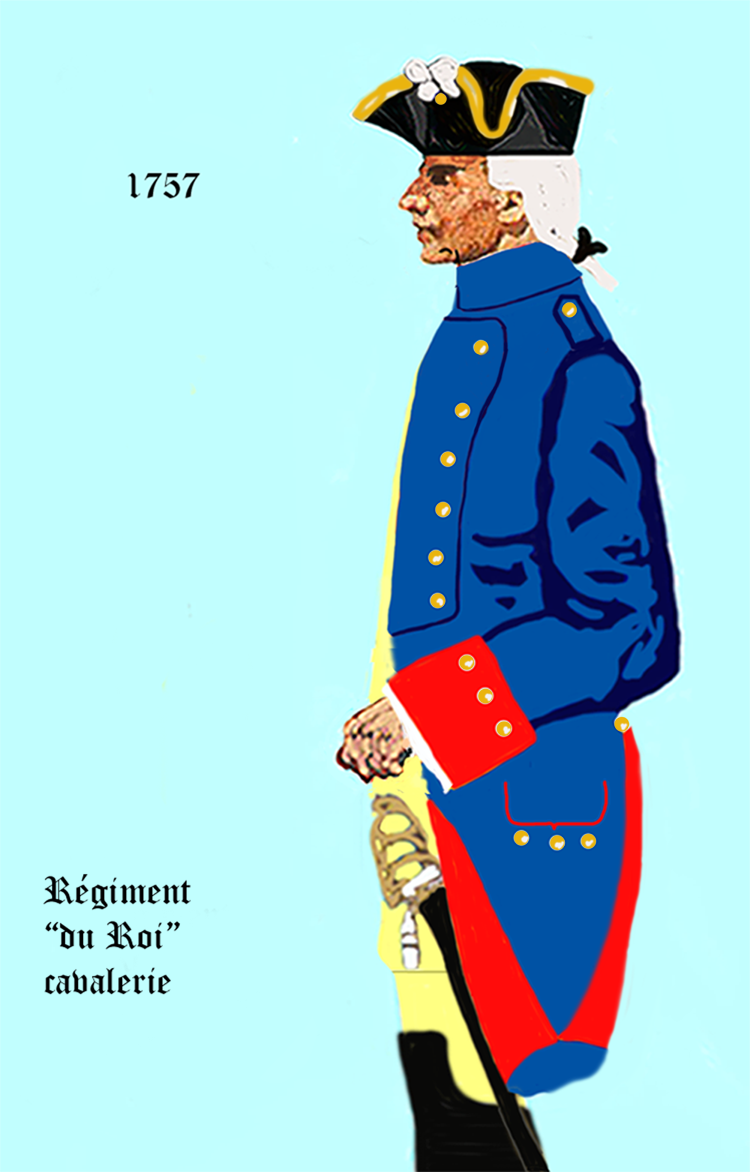
Uniform of the Cavalerie du Roi in 1757.

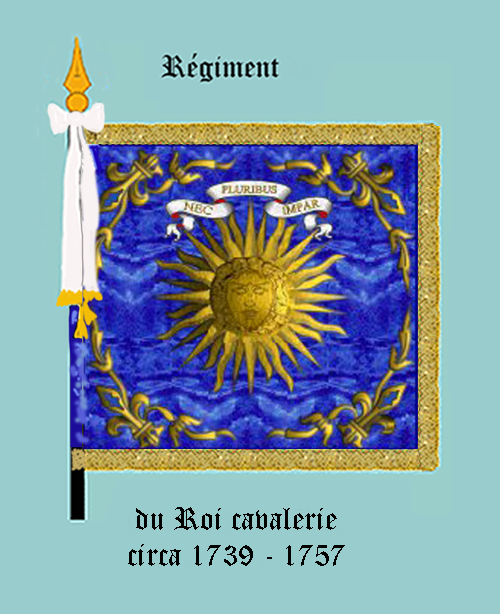
Standard of the Cavalerie du Roi (1739–1757).

== The Revolutionary Wars ==
In 1791 the Régiment du Roi – Cavalerie was renamed the 6e Régiment de Cavalerie (6th Cavalry Regiment).

In 1800 it took part in the battle of Hohenlinden.

== The Napoleonic Wars ==
Regimental flag with battle honours

In 1803 the 6e Régiment de Cavalerie is turned into a cuirassiers regiment and took the name 6e Régiment de Cuirassiers (6th Regiment of Cuirassiers).

In 1809 it took part in the battle of Wagram.

In 1812 it took part in the battle of Borodino.

== The Modern Age ==
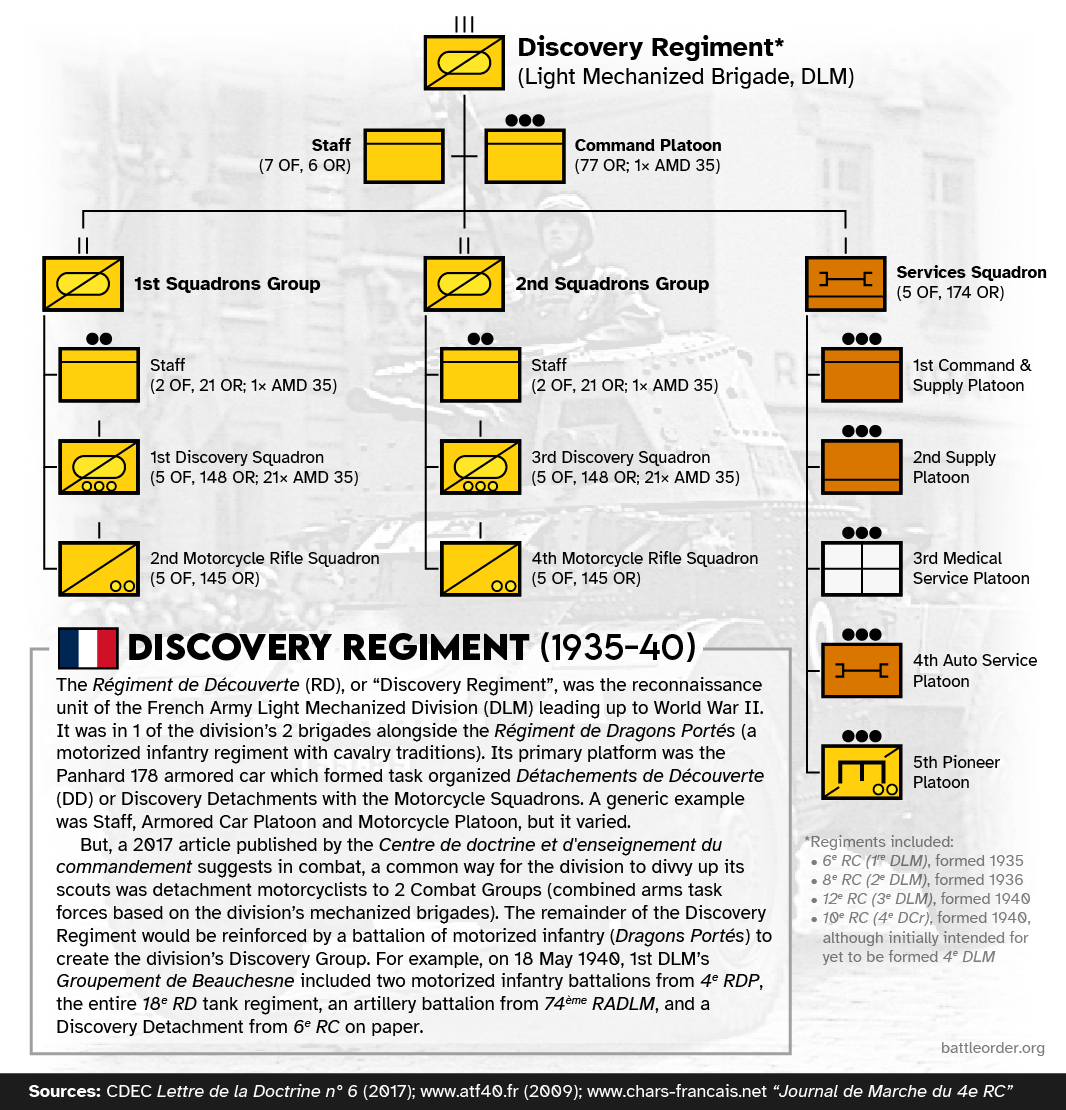
The organization of the Régiment de découverte (DLM) during the Battle of France. The 6th Cuirassier Regiment was the reconnaissance element for 1st DLM at the time.

In 1994 it merged with the 12th Cuirassier Regiment to form the 6th-12th Cuirassier Regiment which was later disbanded in 2009.

== Honours ==
=== Battle honours ===
- Fleurus 1794
- Hohenlinden 1800
- Wagram 1809
- La Moskowa 1812
- L’Avre 1918
- L’Aisne 1918
- Montdidier 1918

=== Decorations ===
- Croix de Guerre 1914–1918 with two palms and one silver gilt star.
- Croix de Guerre 1939–1945 with one palm
