= 6th-12th Cuirassier Regiment =

Former tank regiment of the French Army

- 6-12^{e} Régiment de Cuirassiers
- Active: July 1994 - August 2009
- Country: France
- Branch: French Army
- Type: Armoured Cavalry
- Role: Armoured
- Size: One regiment
- Part of: 2nd Armoured Brigade
- Garrison/HQ: Olivet, France
- Nickname(s): Leclerc Cavalry
- Motto(s): They do not stop Leclerc cavalry!
- Equipment: Leclerc

Commanders
- Current commander: Colonel Lafont-Rapnouil

The 6th-12th Cuirassier Regiment (French: 6e-12e Régiment de Cuirassiers,6e-12e RC) was an armoured cavalry (tank) regiment of the French Army. It was the armoured component of the 2nd Armoured Brigade.

== History ==
The Chief of Staff of the French Army decided on 1 September 1990 to create a new experimental armoured regiment of 80 tanks with two squadron groups (Groupes d’Escadrons, GE). Each group would consist of three combat squadrons and one command and logistics squadron.

The 6e-12e RC was formed in 1994 by merging the 6th Cuirassiers Regiment (Roi Cavalerie) and the 12th Cuirassiers Regiment (Dauphin Cavalerie). It retained this unified structure after the 2nd Armoured Division downsized to a brigade-level command.

It participated in overseas operations in Kosovo, Côte d'Ivoire, Senegal, Chad, and Lebanon.

On 1 August 2009 the unified regiment was disbanded with the deactivation of the 6th Cuirassiers. The 12th Cuirassier Regiment continues in existence.

== Organization ==
The regiment was composed of around 1200 personnel organization into 13 squadrons.

- EAS - Administration and Support Squadron
- 6e Cuirassier Groupe d’Escadron (6e CGE) - 6th Cuirassier Squadron Group (x40 MBTs)
  - ECL - Command and Logistics Squadron
  - 1e Esq - 1st Squadron
  - 2e Esq - 2nd Squadron
  - 3e Esq - 3rd Squadron
- 12e Cuirassier Groupe d’Escadron (12e CGE) 12th Cuirassier Squadron Group (x40 MBTs)
  - ECL - Command and Logistics Squadron
  - 1e Esq - 1st Squadron
  - 2e Esq - 2nd Squadron
  - 3e Esq - 3rd Squadron
- EEI - Reconnaissance Squadron
- EMR - Regimental Maintenance Squadron
- 5e Esq - 5th Reserve Squadron
- 6e Esq - 6th Reserve Squadron
