= 3rd Light Mechanized Division =

The 3rd Light Mechanized Division (French: 3e Division Légère Mécanique, 3e DLM) was a French Army division active during World War II.

== History ==
=== Second World War ===
==== Battle Of France ====
During the Battle of France in May 1940 the division contained the following units:

- 5th Light Mechanized Armoured Brigade
  - 1st Cuirassier Armoured Regiment
  - 2nd Cuirassier Armoured Regiment
- 6th Light Mechanized Infantry Brigade
  - 11th Dragoon Mechanized Infantry Regiment
  - 12th Cuirassier Reconnaissance Cavalry Regiment
- 76th Mechanized Artillery Regiment
