= 12th Cuirassier Regiment (France) =

- 12^{e} Régiment de Cuirassiers
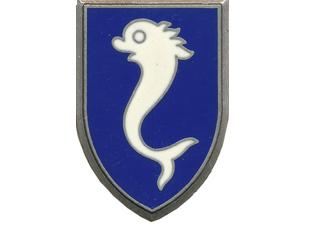
- The regiment's insignia.
- Active: 1794–1814; 1815; 1854–1928; 1940–1942; 1943–1994; 2009–Present
- Country: France
- Branch: French Army
- Type: Cavalry
- Size: 940 personnel
- Part of: 2nd Armoured Brigade
- Garrison/HQ: Quartier Valmy, Olivet
- Motto(s): In periculo ludunt (Amidst danger, they play)

The 12th Cuirassier Regiment (French: 12e Régiment de Cuirassiers, 12e RC) is an armoured cavalry (tank) regiment of the French Army. It provides the armoured component of the 2nd Armoured Brigade. Currently stationed at Quartier Valmy, Olivet, Loiret, France.

== Formation to the First World War ==
The Dauphin's Regiment of Cavalry (Régiment du Dauphin Cavalerie) was established in 1688 under the Ancien Régime. It fought in the Revolutionary Wars.

During the Napoleonic Wars, the regiment took part in most of the major battles, including Austerlitz (1805), Jena (1806), Friedland (1807), Wagram (1809), Borodino (1812), Leipzig (1813) and Waterloo (1815).

During the post-revolution reorganisations of the army, it was redesignated as the 12th Regiment of Cavalry (12éme Régiment de Cavalerie). It saw service in Germany, Italy, and later for a short time in Belgium.

The writer Louis-Ferdinand Céline volunteered for this regiment in 1912.

== First World War ==
Garnison de Départ : Rambouillet. Turned into the 12e régiment de cuirassiers à pied

== Interwar Period ==
Became the 12e Régiment de cuirassiers again in 1919. It was disbanded in 1928.

== World War 2 ==
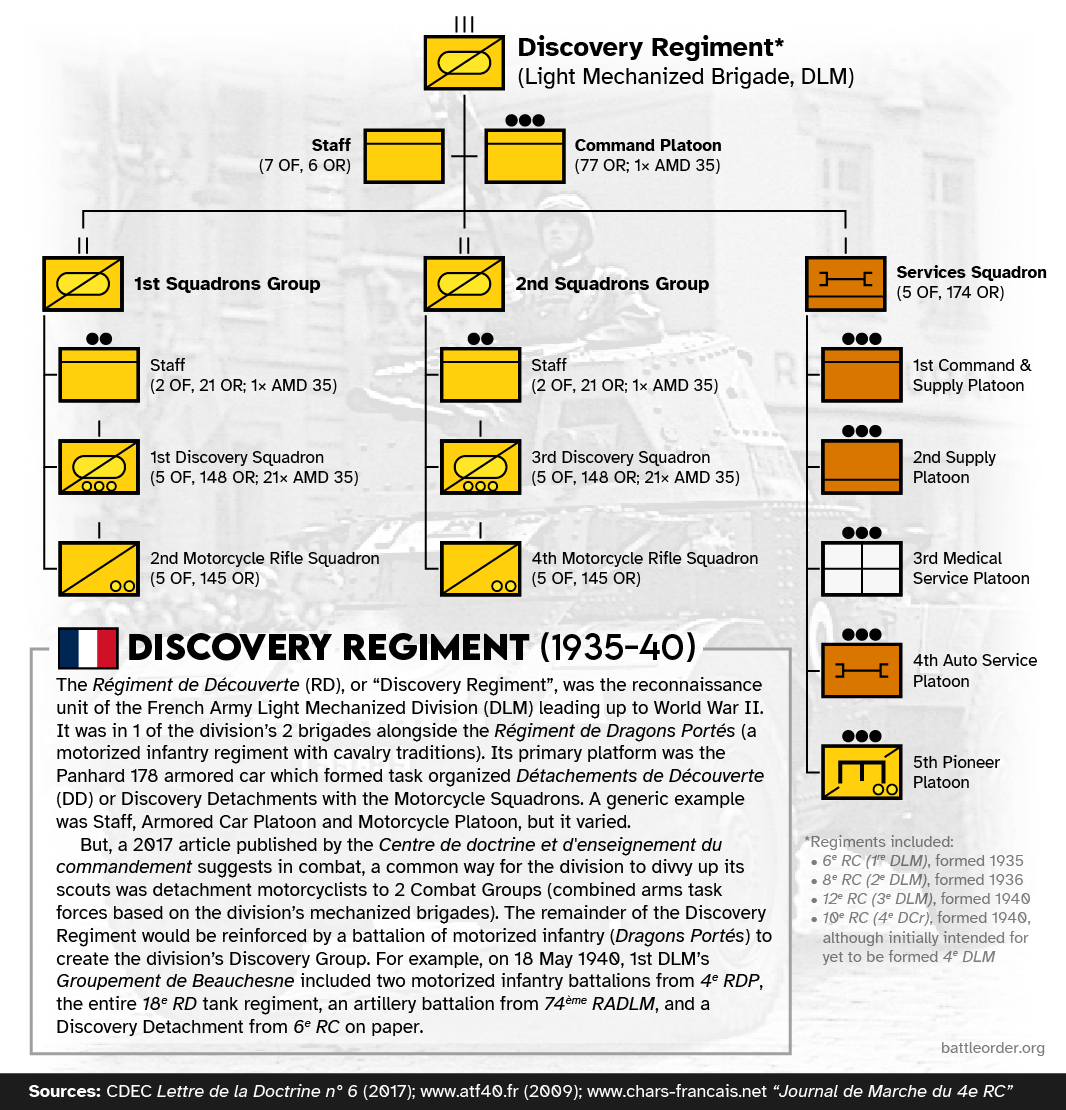
The organization of the Régiment de découverte (DLM) during the Battle of France.

- January 1940: The regiment was serving as the Régiment de Découverte (Discovery Regiment) in the 3rd Light Mechanized Division (3e division légère mécanique), equipped with Panhard P178 armoured cars and Gnome et Rhône motorcycles
- Summer 1940 : Regiment preserved within the framework of the Armée d'Armistice, as a garrison force at Orange
- 1942 : Armée d'Armistice dissolved
- 1943 : Regiment reconstituted as the Régiment de Chars (Tank Regiment) in North Africa, by the splitting of the 12e régiment de chasseurs d'Afrique (12th Regiment of Chasseurs of Africa), and added to the 2e Division Blindée (2nd Armoured Division).

== Recent ==
After having been a garrison force at Müllheim in Germany for a long time in the post-1945 period, it was amalgamated, in 1994, with the 6th Cuirassier Regiment to form the 6th-12th Cuirassier Regiment, based at Olivet in Loiret.

In 2009, the two units were delinked and the 6th Cuirassiers deactivated; the 12th Cuirassiers was re-established as an individual unit.

== Symbol ==
Their symbol is a white dolphin on a blue shield.

== Organization ==
The regiment is composed of around 940 personnel organization into 10 squadrons.

- Escadron d'administration et de soutien (EAS) – Administration and Support Squadron
- Escadron de commandement et de logistique (ECL) – Command and Logistics Squadron
- 1er escadron – 1st Squadron
- 2e escadron – 2nd Squadron
- 3e escadron – 3rd Squadron
- 4e escadron – 4th Squadron
- Escadron d'éclairage et d'investigation de la 2e Brigade blindée (EEI) – Brigade Reconnaissance Squadron
- Escadron de maintenance régimentaire (EMR) – Regimental Maintenance Squadron
- 5e escadron de réserve – 5th Reserve Squadron
- 6e escadron de réserve – 6th Reserve Squadron

== Lineage ==
- 1668 : Raised as a regiment under the name of the régiment Dauphin – cavalerie or, in English, Dauphin's Regiment (Cavalry).
- 1791 : Became 12e régiment de cavalerie
- 1803 : Became 12e régiment de cuirassiers
- 1815 : Dissolved at Niort
- 1854 : Became régiment de cuirassiers de la Garde impériale
- 1855 : Became 1er régiment de cuirassiers de la Garde Impériale (1st Regiment of Cuirassiers of the Imperial Guard) after the creation of a second regiment of Imperial Guard cuirassiers
- 1865 : Merged with the 2e régiment de cuirassiers de la Garde impériale (2nd Cuirassiers Regiment of the Imperial Guard) to form the new régiment de cuirassiers de la Garde impériale (Regiment of Cuirassiers of the Imperial Guard)
- 1871 : Became the 12e régiment de cuirassiers again after the fall of the Second French Empire
- August 1914 : The 12e régiment de cuirassiers was assigned to the 6e brigade de cavalerie (6th Cavalry Brigade), which was itself attached to the 7e division de cavalerie (7th Cavalry Division).
- January 1918: Became 12e régiment de cuirassiers à pied and was reattached to the 2e division de cavalerie à pied (2nd Cavalry Division on foot)

== Commanding officers ==
- 1791 : Charles Michel de Lanay de Vallerie – colonel
- 1792 : Francois Durand Tauzia de la Litterie – colonel
- 1793 : Vrigny – chef de brigade.
- 1793 : Jean-Baptiste Colart – chef de brigade.
- 1795 : Jean Verreaux – chef de brigade.
- 1 May 1796 : Jacques Renard Belfort – chef de brigade then colonel in 1803 (*)
- 27 December 1805 : Joseph Dornes – colonel (*)
- 1809 : Jean-Louis Matheron de Curnieu – colonel
- 1813 : Michel Jean Paul Daudies – colonel
- 1815 : Charles Nicolas Thurot – colonel

*These officers became generals de brigade after this.

== Battle honours, garrisons, campaigns, events ==
=== French Revolutionary Wars ===
As part of the Army of the Rhine from 1792 to 1800:

- 1793 : Stromberg, Alzey, Brumpt, Haguenau and Gambsheim
- 1794 : Rebutte, Spire and Schweigenheim
- 1795 : Frankenthal
- 1796 : Mindelheim, Friedberg, Ulm, Biberach and Müllheim
- 1797 : Crossing of the Rhine
- 1799 : Siege of Philippsburg
- 1800 : Battles of Engen, Moeskirch and Hohenlinden

=== Napoleonic Wars ===
- 1805 : Wertingen, Elchingen, Hollabrunn and Austerlitz (*)
- 1806 : Jena (*)
- 1807 : Heilsberg and Friedland
- 1809 : Eckmühl, Ratisbonne, Essling, and Wagram
- 1812 : Mohilev, Borodino (*) and Winkowo
- 1813 : Bautzen, Reichenbach, Jauer, Dresden, Wachau and Leipzig
- 1814 : La Rothière, Rosnay, Champaubert, Vauchamps, Valjouan, Athies, Reims, Fere-Champenoise, and Paris
- 1815 : Ligny and Waterloo (within 2e brigade, called the brigade Travers, in the 13e division de cavalerie, called the division Wathier, in the IVe corps de cavalerie under général de division comte Édouard Jean Baptiste Milhaud, of the army reserve)

(*) Battle honour on this regiment's flag

Colonels killed and wounded in command of the 12e Cuirassiers:

- Colonel de Curnier : wounded November 1812

Officers killed and wounded whilst serving in the 12e Cuirassiers during the 1805-1815 period:

- Officers killed : 25
- Officers died of wounds: 9
- Officers wounded : 57

== Battle honours ==
The Regiment's standard, with its battle honours.

- Austerlitz 1805
- Iena 1806
- La Moskova 1812
- Solferino 1859
- L'Yser 1914
- L'Avre 1918
- St Mihiel 1918
- Paris 1944
- Strasbourg 1944

== Decorations ==
- Fourragère Croix de guerre 1914–1918
- Fourragère Croix de guerre 1939–1945
- Gold Medal from the town of Milan 1859–1909
- Presidential Unit Citation (American decoration). (1945)

== Quotations about the regiment ==
- 1776 : Charles Juste de Beauvau, Prince de Beauvau:

This regiment, long known as one of the best trained cavalry regiments, entirely merits the reputation it has gained in that sphere. (Ce régiment, qui depuis longtemps passe pour l'un des mieux exercés de la cavalerie, mérite toute la réputation qu'il s'est acquise dans ce genre.)

- 1918 : General Marie-Eugène Debeney:

A regiment of the highest morale and proudly held under fire. (Régiment d'un moral très élevé et d'une superbe tenue au feu.)

- 1940 : General Maxime Weygand:

Thanks to an elite personnel and despite heavy losses, it knew how to preserve a high morale and a magnificent aggressive fervor (Grâce à un personnel d'élite et malgré de lourdes pertes, a su conserver un moral élevé et une ardeur combative magnifique.)

- 1945 : General Charles de Gaulle:

A tank regiment impregnated with the purest traditions of the cavalry, that distinguished itself by the rapidity and audacity of its actions (Régiment de chars imprégné des plus pures traditions de la cavalerie, qui s'est distingué par la rapidité et l'audace de ses actions.)
