= Saintonge Regiment =

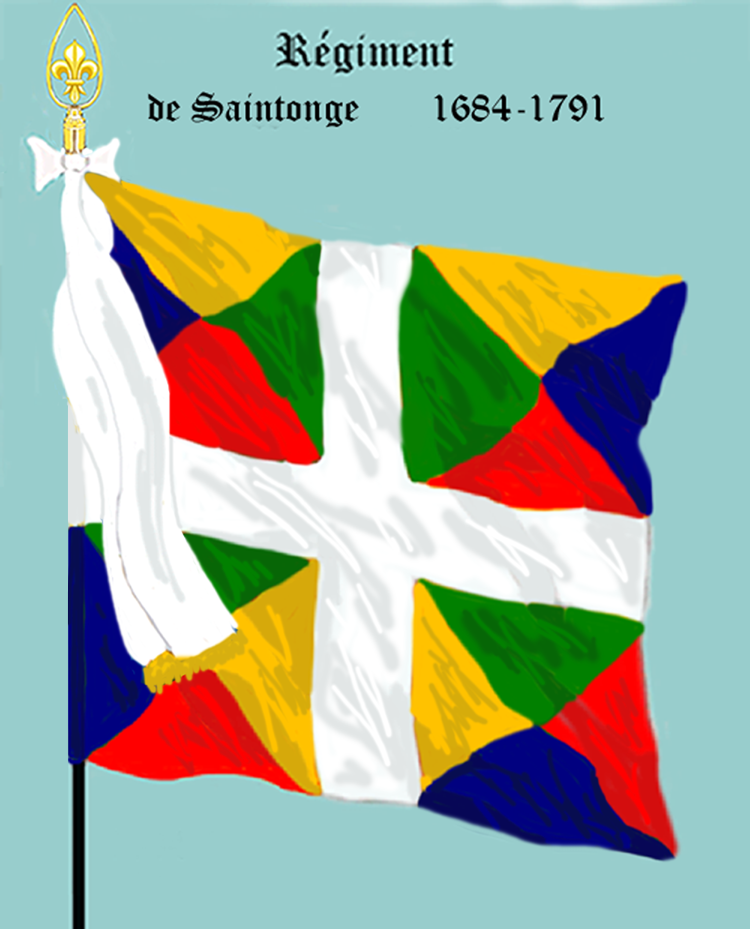
- Active: 1684–1792
- Country: Kingdom of France
- Allegiance: Ancien Régime
- Branch: French Royal Army
- Type: Infantry
- Size: 2 battalions
- Engagements: American Revolutionary War: Siege of Yorktown

Commanders
- Notable commanders: Adam Phillipe Jarreck, the Count de Custine

The Saintonge Regiment, also known as the 85e Regiment of the Line, was raised in the year 1684 in the province of Saintonge, France. From 1763 to 1768 the regiment served in the West indies and French Guiana. In 1780 the regiment was sent with Jean-Baptiste Donatien de Vimeur, comte de Rochambeau to help the United States during the American Revolutionary War. The regiment took part in the Siege of Yorktown in 1781. In 1782 the regiment returned to the West Indies and then back to France in 1783. Following the French Revolution the regiment became the 82e Regiment of Infantry.

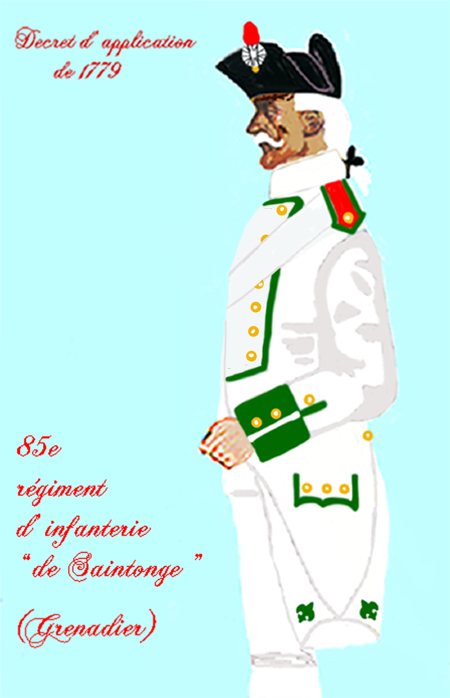
Uniform of a grenadier of the Régiment de Saintonge during the American Revolution.
