= Charles Rondony =

French general

- Charles Rondony pictured in L'Illustration in 1914
- Born: 6 March 1856; Prats-de-Mollo-la-Preste, Pyrénées-Orientales
- Died: 22 August 1914 (aged 58); Rossignol, Belgium
- Military career
- Allegiance: France
- Branch: French Army
- Service years: 1875–1914
- Rank: Général de brigade
- Conflicts: Tonkin War (1884–5); Pacification of Tonkin (1891–7); Boxer Rebellion (1900–1); First World War (1914)
- Awards: Commander of the Legion of Honour; Commander of the Order of the Dragon of Annam; Colonial Medal; Tonkin Expedition commemorative medal; Twice cited in the Order of the Day

Charles Rondony (6 March 1856 – 22 August 1914) was a French general. Joining the metropolitan army as a private soldier in 1875 he rapidly rose through the ranks and was commissioned into the Troupes de marine (colonial army) in 1880. Serving in the Tonkin War in command of indigenous troops he was wounded during an attack on a fort, he was posted briefly to Senegal before returning to Tonkin in 1890. During the Pacification of Tonkin Rondony distinguished himself, being wounded twice in action, being cited in the order of the day, receiving the Tonkin and Colonial Medals and being appointed a commander of the Order of the Dragon of Annam. Returning to France in 1897 he was promoted to lieutenant-colonel and saw service in the Boxer Rebellion of 1900–01. Furthers postings in Tonkin and Madagascar followed before Rondony was promoted to général de brigade in France. Holding command of the 3rd Colonial Brigade upon the start of the First World War he led it in defeat at the Battle of Rossignol on 22 August 1914. Rondony and his divisional commander, Léon Amédée François Raffenel, were killed in action, the first French generals to die during the war.

== Early life and non-commissioned career ==
Born on 6 March 1856 at Prats-de-Mollo-la-Preste, Pyrénées-Orientales, to Bonaventure and Julie Tardey Rondony, Rondony enlisted in the French Army's 22nd Line Infantry Regiment as a 2nd class private on 5 November 1875. Rondony soon received promotion, first to corporal on 7 May 1876 and to quartermaster-sergeant on 11 November the same year. He was demoted to sergeant on 26 February 1877 but reappointed quartermaster-sergeant on 26 May. He was appointed to the senior non-commissioned rank of sergeant-major on 14 October 1877 and to adjutant on 6 November 1879.

== Colonial campaigns ==
Rondony transferred from the metropolitan army into the 5th Marine Infantry Regiment of the troupes de marine (the French colonial army, controlled by the navy rather than the war office) on 6 October 1880 and received a commission as a second lieutenant four days later. Rondony served in French Indo-China from 13 January 1883 until 23 May, being promoted to lieutenant in the Tirailleurs Annamites two days later for service in Tonkin. He was wounded in the left shoulder whilst attacking a fort at Dong Lai on 15 May.

Rondony transferred to the 2nd Tonkinese Rifles on 16 June 1885, and to the 2nd Marine Infantry on 29 September before his return to France in December of that year. Posted to Senegal on 8 February 1887 he was transferred to the Senegalese Tirailleurs on 21 May. He was appointed a chevalier of the Legion of Honour on 16 June. Remaining in Senegal he was promoted to captain in the 1st Marine Infantry Regiment on 21 February 1888 before leaving for France on 2 March 1889. He was transferred to the 4th Marine Infantry Regiment on 11 April 1890 and to the 3rd Tonkinese Rifles on 16 February 1891, prior to his return to Tonkin on 15 March that year. He was wounded again in the left shoulder on 23 September 1892 at Dong Rhé and once more by a bullet on 11 December 1892. Cited in the Order of the Day on 14 December for "great vigour" displayed in action at Long-Xa in July and August 1892, he also held the Colonial Medal and the Tonkin Expedition commemorative medal.

Remaining in Tonkin Rondony was transferred to the 5th Marine Infantry regiment on 3 March 1893 and to the 9th Marine Infantry Regiment on 1 April 1894, where he received promotion to chef du bataillon on 13 July. He joined the 4th Marine Infantry on 19 July 1894, returned to the 3rd Tonkinese Rifles on 11 January 1896 and to the 2nd Tonkinese Rifles on 23 July that year. Rondony left Tonkin for France on 21 July 1897 where he joined the 1st Marine Infantry Regiment and was married on 18 October 1897. He had received an appointed as commander of the Order of the Dragon of Annam on 4 July 1897. Promoted to lieutenant-colonel on 8 March 1900 he joined the 17th Marine Infantry during the Boxer Rebellion on 1 July 1900 and served on the staff of the general commanding Indo-China from 24 September to 1 November 1901. Rondony was posted from China to Tonkin, arriving on 8 November 1901 and was again transferred to the 3rd Tonkinese Rifles on 1 February 1902. Leaving for France on 18 May 1902 Rondony was transferred to the 3rd Colonial Infantry Regiment on 31 May and to the 23rd Colonial Infantry Regiment on 16 September 1902. He was appointed an officer of the Legion of Honour on 13 July 1903.

Being posted to Madagascar on 10 July 1904 Rondony was transferred to the 13th Colonial Infantry Regiment on 20 September 1904 and promoted Colonel on 21 December. He joined the 1st Tirailleurs Malgaches Regiment on 17 January 1905 and the 7th Colonial Infantry Regiment on 19 August 1906. Returning once more to Tonkin on 29 January 1912 with command of a brigade and a position with the 3rd Colonial Infantry Regiment he received promotion to général de brigade on 18 March 1913. He became a commander of the Legion of Honour on 11 July 1914.

== First World War ==
Holding command of the 3rd Colonial Infantry Brigade (consisting of the 3rd and 7th Colonial Infantry Regiments) upon the French mobilisation in August 1914 he moved his brigade by rail from the south-west of France to the Meuse where it formed part of the 3rd Colonial Division under Général Léon Amédée François Raffenel (along with the 1st Colonial Brigade). Rondony's brigade crossed the Semois River to enter Belgium and confront the invading German army. Engaged at the Battle of Rossignol on 22 August 1914, the 3rd Colonial Division was defeated with heavy losses. Although Rondony's troops fared better than other elements of the division, which ceased to exist as a formed unit, the 3rd Colonial Infantry Regiment lost 2,085 men killed, wounded or missing and the 7th Colonial Infantry Regiment some 1,500. Rondony and Raffenel were amongst those killed, becoming the first French generals to lose their lives during the war. Rondony was cited in a general order of 19 September 1914 for his "glorious death".
