= Léon Amédée François Raffenel =

French army general

- Born: 14 August 1856; Saint-Servan, Ille-et-Vilaine
- Died: 22 August 1914 (aged 58); Rossignol, Belgium
- Spouse: Fernande Marie Gabrielle
- Military career
- Allegiance: France
- Branch: French Army
- Service years: 1875–1914
- Rank: Général de brigade
- Conflicts: Pacification of Tonkin (1887–1889) (1890–1892); First World War (1914)
- Awards: Officer of the Legion of Honour; Commander of the Order of the Dragon of Annam; Tonkin Expedition commemorative medal; Twice cited in the order of the day; Order of Karađorđe's Star

Léon Amédée François Raffenel (14 August 1856 – 22 August 1914) was a general of the French army. Enlisting into the army in 1875 he quickly rose through the ranks and was accepted into the Ecole Spéciale Militaire de Saint-Cyr in 1876. He saw extensive active service with the French colonial army in the Pacification of Tonkin between 1887 and 1892, being cited in the order of the day for his adept command of columns of native infantry. Having married in 1893 Raffenel requested transfer to the France-based metropolitan army in 1894. This unusual move was complicated by the separate organisation of the two French armies but was approved by presidential decree. Raffenel spent 16 years in the metropolitan army and commanded the 27th Infantry Regiment and the elite 82nd Light Infantry Brigade. He was promoted to général de brigade in 1911 and received command of the 3rd Colonial Infantry Division, one of the finest divisions of the French Army. He fought with this unit at the Battle of Rossignol on 22 August 1914 and was killed in action in what was a heavy defeat for the French troops.

== Early life and non-commissioned career ==
Raffenel was born at midday on 14 August 1856 at Saint-Servan, Ille-et-Vilaine. He was the son of Ame Jean Baptiste Raffenel, a marine commissioner and chevalier of the Legion of Honour; and of Hortense Marguerite Hoël, who lived in Saint-Servan. Raffenel enlisted in the army on 8 July 1875 for a five-year term and was posted to the 82nd Infantry Regiment as a 2nd class private. He was promoted to corporal on 15 January 1876 and to quartermaster-sergeant on 15 July that year.

== Colonial service ==
Raffenel entered the Ecole Spéciale Militaire de Saint-Cyr on 28 October 1876 as an officer-cadet, graduating on 1 October 1878 as a second lieutenant in the 1st Marine Infantry Regiment. Serving in Martinique from 16 March 1881, he received promotion to lieutenant on 16 April. Transferring to the 4th Marine Infantry on 25 May 1883, he returned to France on 9 July and was promoted captain on 8 December. Raffenel served as adjutant of the regiment from 31 March 1884.

Raffenel transferred to the 4th Tonkinese Rifles on 10 September 1886 and took part in the Tonkin War from 18 January 1887. He fought at Muong-Vi on 10 April 1887 when he led the "Raffenel Column" and transferred to the 1st Tonkinese Rifles on 21 May 1887. He was awarded the Tonkin Expedition commemorative medal on 26 July 1887 and received a commendation recognising the energy and efficiency he displayed in the campaign. Raffenel was transferred to the 1st Marine Infantry on 22 December 1888 and returned to France on 12 March 1889, serving as regimental adjutant from 19 August 1889 to 8 August 1890. He was appointed a Chevalier of the Order of the Dragon of Annam on 7 February 1890. Raffenel was posted to the 2nd Tonkinese Rifles on 8 August 1890 and promoted to chef de bataillon on 3 October. Returning to Tonkin on 23 October 1890 he fought at Ben-Chan on 29 October 1890 as part of the "Pardes Column". A "Raffenel Column" was formed again between 29 November and 23 December 1890 and saw action at Baïbang on 5 September, Doung-De on 7 December, Yen-Dong on 13 December and at Kher-Khong on 16 December. He served with the Dominé Column and fought at Cai-Tram on 16 June 1891. He received a commendation for his actions during these operations: "as a captain and chef de bataillion he commanded several small columns of Tonkinese troops, demonstrating energy and initiative under very difficult circumstances". He returned to France on 25 March 1892 and joined the 6th Marine Infantry Regiment on 14 April 1892. He transferred to the 1st Marine Infantry on 1 June 1892, serving on detachment in Paris away from the regiment, and to the 5th Marine Infantry on 19 October 1893. Raffenel was appointed a Chevalier of the Legion of Honour on 29 December 1892. He married Fernande Marie Gabrielle on 11 April 1893. They lived at Saintes, Charente-Maritime, and had two sons.

== Return to metropolitan army ==
Raffenel requested a transfer to the metropolitan army, in which he began his career as an enlisted soldier, in 1894 for "personal reasons". This was an unusual occurrence owing to the difficulty of transfer from the Troupes de Marine, under the authority of the naval office, to the army under the war office. He made the request in order to reduce the time he spent abroad on campaign, though whether this was due to family difficulties or health problems is unclear. He received a presidential decree authorising his transfer on 5 November 1894, having arranged to swap places with Chef de Bataillon Lourdel-Henault of the 136th Infantry Regiment. His new lieutenant-colonel was known to have welcomed this "valuable acquisition for the regiment". He became an officer of the Order of the Dragon of Annam on 25 January 1895.

Raffenel served with the 136th Regiment in garrison at Querqueville, Cherbourg where he was described as "intelligent, educated, hardworking, very zealous, very dedicated, very active and a good rider, a valorous officer who may achieve high rank in the future". He was promoted to lieutenant-colonel in the 48th Infantry Regiment on 7 October 1899 and spent one year on detachment with the 35th Artillery Regiment, learning about artillery - particularly the 75mm gun - and lecturing to the artillery officers on infantry tactics. Afterwards Raffenel returned to the 48th Infantry at Guingamp where he served as second-in-command. He was promoted to colonel in the 27th Infantry Regiment on 8 July 1904 and was commended for his "military qualities : tact, firmness, discipline, excellent service and devotion to his duties", serving with them at Dijon. He transferred to the 85th Infantry Regiment and became commander of the 82nd Brigade on 28 September 1910. This brigade of light infantry, based at Saint-Dié-des-Vosges, was one of the elite units of the French Army. A report of the time describes Raffenel "as a commanding officer very dignified, very dedicated, moderate and tactful, as a regimental commander he is sympathetic without lacking firmness. Esteemed and loved, he could not be more worthy to be promoted to général de brigade, a rank he deserves in all respects".

== General ==
Raffenel was appointed as général de brigade on 25 March 1911 and as an officer of the Legion of Honour on 29 March. He received command of the 3rd Colonial Infantry Division, one of the finest in the French Army, which marked a return to the colonial army of his early career after 20 years with metropolitan units.

Upon the outbreak of the First World War Raffenel led his division from Brest to Bar-le-Duc on the Belgian frontier. On 22 August he led it over the Semois River into the Belgian village of Rossignol. There, surrounded by the German VI Corps, and fighting for six hours on a 600m wide front, the division was heavily defeated. French losses were devastating - some 11,000 of the 15,000 men in the division were casualties, making Rossignol the deadliest action of the Battle of the Frontiers. The 1st colonial Brigade ceased to exist as a formed unit; the 1st Colonial Infantry Regiment lost 2,500 killed and wounded, the 2nd lost 2,850, the 3rd 2,085 and the 7th 1,500. Of Raffenel's cavalry, the 3rd African Chasseurs Regiment, there remained just one and a half squadrons fit for duty. Both Raffenel and the commander of the 3rd Colonial Brigade, General Charles Rondony, were killed in action that day and General Montignault, commanding the 1st Colonial Brigade, was wounded and taken prisoner. Raffenel, who had been shot, and Rondony were the first French general officers to die during the war. His body was discovered after the battle by Captain Hartmann of the 3rd Colonial Infantry Regiment but was later recovered and buried at Tintigny by the German forces.
