= Battle of Rossignol =

1914 battle of the First World War

- Part of Battle of the Frontiers of the First World War
- The village of Rossignol after the battle
Date	22 August 1914
Location	Rossignol, near Tintigny, Belgium 49°43′02″N 5°29′17″E
Result	German victory

Belligerents
France	German Empire

Commanders and leaders
(French Third Republic) Jules Lefèvre	(German Empire) Kurt von Pritzelwitz

Units involved
Colonial Corps	VI Corps

Casualties and losses
11,648	3,473–3,984

The Battle of Rossignol (22 August 1914) one of the first battles of the First World War, was part of the Battle of the Frontiers on the Western Front between the German and French armies. To counter the German invasion of Belgium, the French commander-in-chief, General Joseph Joffre, ordered an attack upon the centre of the German front. The attack was to be conducted by the French Fourth Army comprising the Colonial Corps and II Corps. Simultaneously, the German army turned the 5th Army southwards towards the French border. The French Colonial Corps advanced towards Neufchâteau expecting the nearest German forces to be several days march away.

Advanced elements of the 3rd Colonial Infantry Division (Léon Amédée François Raffenel) marching column clashed with German cavalry north of Rossignol and soon found themselves facing a strong defensive German position. After several bayonet charges through dense woods failed to make progress, French troops retreated southwards to Rossignol. The German 11th Division and 12th Division pushed around both flanks and engaged that part of the Colonial Corps still on the march. With the French II Corps behind schedule and unable to offer any support, German artillery destroyed the bridge at Breuvanne. The bridge was on the only route by which the 3rd Colonial Division at Rossignol could be reinforced. The Germans then defeated the French remaining in the village, the rest of the Colonial Corps pulled back to defensive positions.

The 3rd Colonial Division was destroyed as a fighting force, with casualties of about 10,520. Raffenel was killed as was Charles Rondony one of his brigade commanders; Charles Montignault, the other brigade commander, was captured. Another 868 men were lost from the supporting 2nd Colonial Division; German casualties were between 3,473 and 3,984 men. The alleged involvement of francs-tireurs at Tintigny and Rossignol resulted in reprisals in which German troops killed 63 civilians shortly after the battle; another 122 were court-martialed and shot.

== Background ==
Pre-war concentrations of forces on the Western Front

Germany declared war upon Russia on 1 August 1914 and upon France two days later. The German high command sought quick results over France in the west before the Russian Army could complete its longer mobilisation. The Germans implemented a modified form of the Schlieffen Plan, a pre-war deployment plan that sought to outflank the French fortifications that were south of Verdun. On 4 August German armies advanced into Belgium, whilst holding a static defensive front in the south. The French Colonial Corps, part of the Fourth Army was situated at Stenay (North-eastern France) on the river Chiers, with the XII Corps on its left flank and the II Corps on its right. The Colonial Corps was formed of Troupes coloniales raised in France for service abroad, as well as troops raised in the colonies, such as parts of the Army of Africa.

The corps comprised the 2nd and 3rd Colonial Divisions. The 3rd Colonial Division, which saw the most fighting at Rossignol, was composed entirely of regular army troops and was considered one of the elite formations of the French army. The men were all volunteers, as French law forbade the use of its metropolitan conscripts abroad and almost all had seen action in the colonies. The only reserve elements in the formation, the 5th and 6th reserve squadrons of the 6th Dragoon Regiment which had recently joined the division as reinforcements, were composed mainly of former Colonial Corps soldiers and so were rated highly. The division was reckoned to be of a similar standard to that of the British regular army.

General Joffre, commander-in-chief of the French armies, decided to strike against the German centre in Belgium to threaten the communication lines of the German right flank which would be subject to a simultaneous attack by the northern French forces. In accordance with this plan the French Grand Quartier Général (GQG, army headquarters) issued orders for the Fourth Army to move north into Belgium at 9.30 p.m. on 20 August. The Colonial Corps was to establish itself at Tintigny, in Belgium on 22 August whilst the II Corps was to move on Léglise via Bellefontaine to cover the right flank.

== Prelude ==
Map showing army-level movements on the Western Front in August 1914

The Colonial Corps set off northwards with an advance guard drawn from the 3rd Colonial Division (General Charles Montignault). This unit, comprising the 1st Colonial Infantry Regiment, the 4th battery of the 2nd Field Artillery Regiment, two platoons of the 3rd Chasseurs d'Afrique and the 6th Squadron of the 6th Dragoon Regiment, marched north to Virton, Belgium. The French troops brushed aside German cavalry reconnaissance units and met no resistance. The French advanced through Chauvenoy, St Vincent and captured the bridge at Breuvanne by nightfall on 21 August. The remainder of the 3rd Colonial Division followed on behind, hampered by late changes of orders, blocked roads, hot weather, a rainstorm and thick fog; the unit made the 17-mile (27-kilometre) journey in twenty hours.

The opposing German forces comprised the VI Corps (General Kurt von Pritzelwitz) which took little offensive action on 20 August except to capture Neufchâteau to billet the XVIII Reserve Corps. Late on 21 August German strategy was changed, instead of proceeding westwards the 5th Army (Crown Prince Wilhelm) was directed to turn south to capture Virton. The 11th Division (5th Army) was to take Tintigny and the 12th Division Rossignol, with the 4th Army protecting their right flank. The French Fourth Army cavalry and aerial reconnaissance units had detected the strong German presence and the lack of westward movement. GQG refused to change their assessment of the situation and told French generals that the German forces were still assumed to be proceeding to the north-west at some two to three days march from the 3rd Colonial Division.

== Battle ==
=== Morning ===
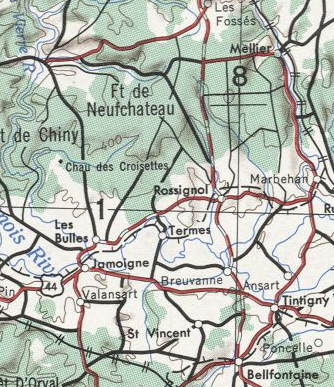
Rossignol and vicinity from a 1954 map, Neufchâteau is off the north of this extract, Virton to the south-south-east and Sedan due west.

At 6:40 a.m. on 22 August General Léon Raffenel, commander of the 3rd Colonial Division, reached St Vincent in heavy fog where he met with the Colonial Corps commander, General Jules Lefèvre. Lefèvre issued his orders for the day, stating that Raffenel was to march 25 kilometres (16 miles) to Neufchâteau and secure billets. Lefèvre indicated that he did not expect to encounter the enemy until 23 or 24 August. The German 4th Army spotted the advance of the Colonial Corps by aerial reconnaissance and their cavalry screen but did not know whether this force intended to continue north or move eastwards. The German 11th and 12th divisions were warned to expect contact with strong French forces.

Final confirmation of the French intentions came on the morning of 22 August when the German cavalry screen encountered French troops of the 6th Dragoons moving northwards on the road to Neufchâteau. The opposing cavalry met some 600 metres (660 yards) south of Rossignol and the French drove back the Germans, clearing the road. The remainder of the 3rd Colonial Division, following in column along a road hemmed in by thick hedgerows and wire fences, was in good spirits in anticipation of an easy march. The French dragoons soon crossed the Semois River and cleared the village of Rossignol before heading into the dense Ligny forest. Around 500 metres (550 yards) into the forest they met elements of the German 2nd Uhlan Regiment which had been advancing southwards from Les Fosses. The Uhlans dismounted and opened fire before withdrawing northwards.

The French cavalry resumed their advance but 1,000 metres (1,100 yards) further north came upon the 157th Infantry Regiment deployed in defensive positions behind a crest, from which it could carry out enfilade fire upon the road, at several kilometres range. The French cavalry suffered many casualties from rifle fire and withdrew behind a crest. At 7:23 a.m. the French advance guard commander requested additional orders from his superiors - he was told to recommence the advance but protested that it was impossible to do so. The 2nd Battalion, 1st Colonial Infantry Regiment was sent forwards to clear the road by the bayonet. The colonel of the colonial regiment believed he was facing only a small German detachment, with their nearest major units still believed to be some 35 kilometres (22 miles) to the east. Frontal bayonet charges were unable to penetrate the strong German positions, with the French hampered by the dense forest that surrounded the road and limited visibility to 50 metres (55 yards). The German forces were forced to remain in their positions, unable to counter-attack due to the continuous assaults and inability to deploy their artillery within the forest.

=== Late morning ===
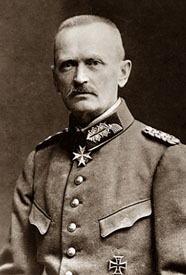
General Martin Chales de Beaulieu, commander of the German 12th Division

Raffenel met with his advance guard commander and decided the German forces were of no significant strength. Raffenel established his command post in Rossignol and ordered the 2nd Colonial Infantry Regiment, which had arrived at 10:00 a.m. under the command of Charles Rondony, to support the 1st Colonial Infantry in the forest. Raffenel also ordered the divisional artillery deployed near the village where it could fire on the forest under protection from the 3rd African Chasseurs and one detached battalion of the 2nd Colonial Infantry.

General Martin Chales de Beaulieu, commander of the German 12th Division, became aware that the 157th Infantry Regiment was under great pressure and had suffered many casualties. Beaulieu ordered the 63rd Infantry Regiment and a battery of artillery to move around the French left flank to Termes. This force entered Termes at 11:00 a.m. and engaged French troops still moving along the road towards Rossignol. A firefight erupted and a battery of the German artillery went into action on nearby Hill 363, supported by the machine-guns of the infantry. A French artillery battery, still in column of march and unable to move off the road due to marshes and fences, deployed on the highway and within minutes had destroyed three guns and killed or wounded most of the crews. The two remaining German batteries deployed behind the crest of Hill 363 and commenced indirect fire upon the French column. The supporting 63rd Infantry Regiment was unable to advance to the road but continued to harass the French forces.

Simultaneously the 11th Division (General Von Weber), moved to seize Tintigny via Ansart and discovered the French 3rd Colonial Division in column of march on the Rossignol–Breuvanne road. Deploying some artillery onto Hill 345, near Breuvanne bridge, the remainder of the 11th Division advance guard continued its march southwards. Thus the French found themselves threatened on both flanks.

=== French withdrawal ===
The French continued to attack the German centre in the Ligny Forest and by 10:30 a.m. most of the 157th Infantry Regiment's officers had become casualties and the German troops began to waver. French officers, easily distinguished by their gold braided kepis and white gloves, suffered particularly heavy casualties – including three battalion commanders who were hit by one burst of machine-gun fire. Lacking senior commanders the French were fragmented into squad-sized units led by subalterns and non-commissioned officers. Lieutenant-Colonel Guerin, noting the disorganisation amongst the remaining troops, took the initiative and ordered a fighting withdrawal towards Rossignol. A covering position was established some 300 m (330 yd) south of the forest edge. The French cavalry at Rossignol, receiving orders to defend a French battery deployed to the east, failed to locate the artillery and instead attempted to charge the German artillery on Hill 363. Unable to reach the gunners due to marshland, impenetrable fences and German return-fire they moved south across the Breuvanne bridge and west towards Termes. This difficult movement badly disorganised the unit and it took until the end of the day for it to reform, ruling out its involvement in the battle.

=== Encirclement of Rossignol ===
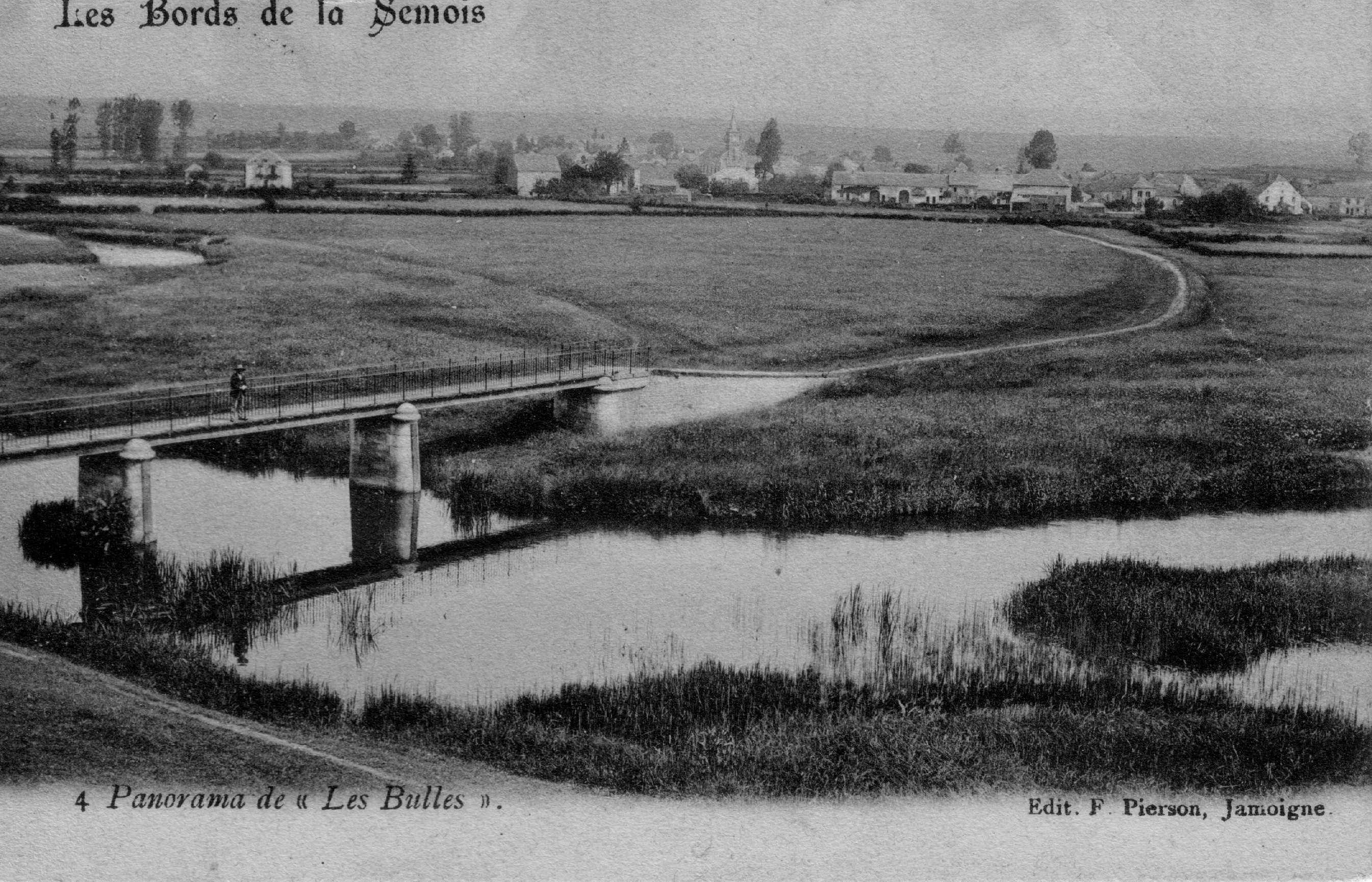
A contemporary photograph of the Semois River at nearby Les Bulles

At 11:00 a.m. the bridge over the Semois, the only way to Rossignol from the south, was destroyed by German artillery fire from the 11th Division at Ansart. This prevented two battalions of the 3rd Colonial Infantry Regiment, all of the 7th Colonial Infantry Regiment and the Colonial Corps artillery from reaching Rossignol. Raffenel, already concerned by the delays in bringing up his reserves, was isolated in Rossignol with a fraction of his division. Beaulieu committed his reserve brigade to take the French covering position south of the woods.

To the south, the French artillery remained confined to the road, unable to render any support to the troops at Rossignol and being whittled down by infantry attacks and artillery-fire from the east, west and south-east. The German 11th Division, less the one battalion of artillery at Hill 345, had reached Tintigny by 10:00 a.m. and continued towards St Vincent. At Tintigny the streets had been barricaded with wagons and German artillery units moving through the town were fired upon, injuring some horses. The Germans retaliated by setting fire to some houses to flush out their attackers and opened fire on the church with artillery, causing some French civilian deaths. The initial attacks were blamed by the Germans on armed civilian francs-tireurs but other sources suggest the attackers were a French patrol or mobilised Belgian forestry troops.

At the same time Lefèvre and his Colonial Corps headquarters was moving through St Vincent on the way to Neufchâteau. Encountering a small unit of German cavalry north of the town, which was dispersed by his Dragoon escort, the headquarters staff found themselves subject to artillery and rifle fire. Lefèvre ordered the 7th Colonial Infantry Regiment and some artillery to the east of St Vincent to defend the village and removed his headquarters to Jamoigne. Here he encountered the lead elements of the 2nd Colonial Division (General Paul Leblois), which, comprising the Fourth Army reserve, he lacked the authority from his commander to redirect. Leblois acted unilaterally to send the 22nd Colonial Infantry Regiment to Termes to support the 3rd Colonial Division. They pushed back two German battalions and retook half the village before being ordered to withdraw, for the loss of 2 officers and 54 men killed and 14 officers and 182 men wounded. The French II Corps was unable to render any effective support on the right flank as, three hours behind schedule, it was halted to the south of Tintigny.

The 3rd Colonial Division at Rossignol, cut into two by the destruction of the bridge, hurriedly organised the defence of the village. The forward elements were still fighting a retreat from the woods and he had no means of communication with that part of his division trapped south of the river. The 1st and 2nd battalions of the 3rd Colonial Infantry Regiment, unable to join their third battalion at Rossignol instead attacked the Germans to the west at Termes. Suffering losses from artillery and machine-gun fire from Termes and in their rear from Ansart they were eventually forced to retreat to Jamoigne.

=== Afternoon ===
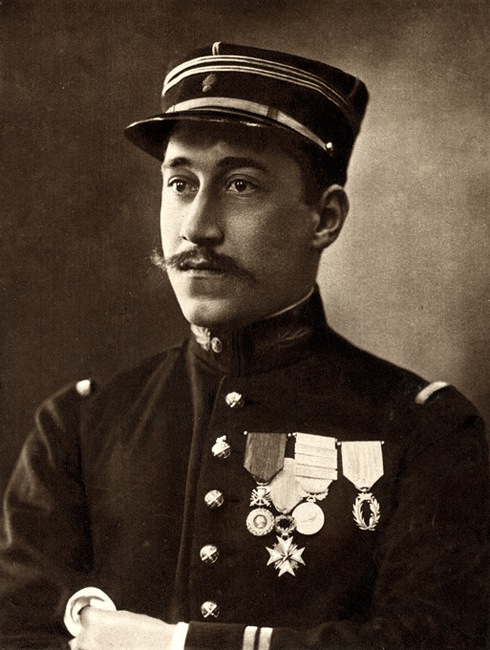
Ernest Psichari who died during the last stand of the French artillery at Rossignol

At 12:30 p.m. the German 157th Infantry Regiment and 2nd Uhlans reached the southern limit of the forest and encountered Rondony's hastily organised defence – which had orders from Raffenel to hold Rossignol "at all costs" – defending a small crest. The force comprised only some 900 men with 15 officers of the infantry but was supported by the machine-gun companies of the 1st and 2nd Colonial Infantry Regiments, whose twelve guns stiffened the defence. The Germans managed to bring up two 77 mm field guns and two 105 mm howitzers along the forest road which opened fire on Rondony's men and the clock tower in the village; further fire was directed upon the French from artillery across the Semois to their rear. For more than two hours Rondony, reinforced by ad hoc units retreating from the woods, was able to hold on. The first big German attack came at 2:30 p.m. and was repulsed by machine-gun and rifle fire but French resistance was weakening, by 3:00 p.m. only 500 men remained in the firing line and most of the French machine-guns were out of action. A second German assault at 3:30 p.m. managed to gain the crest, despite a desperate French counter-charge and forced the French back to the village. The divisional HQ had been dispersed by 2:00 p.m. and Raffenel was last seen alive reporting to the commander of the 3rd Colonial Infantry Regiment, having crossed the Semois carrying a rifle, that all was lost.

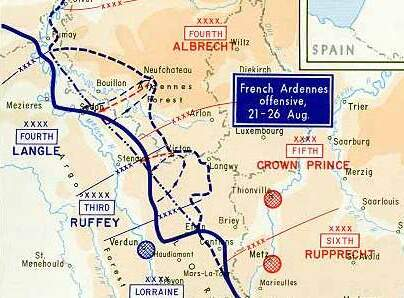
Map showing French reversals in the Ardennes after 21 August 1914

An initial attack upon Rossignol at 4:00 p.m. was defeated after half an hour's hard fighting on the fringe of the village. With the covering position neutralised, the German artillery was able to move through the forest and come into action, setting the village ablaze. German forces eschewed a direct assault, encircled the village and captured outlying French positions and the divisional command staff – some 328 men. German troops then captured the remaining French artillery trapped between Rossignol and the Semois river. The French gunners fired the remainder of their ammunition, disabled their guns and killed their limber horses before surrendering. It was in this action that French author, religious thinker and artillery officer Ernest Psichari was killed whilst defending his guns. The last French resistance in Rossignol was at the north of the village where mutual exhaustion had led to a lull. The Germans committed the 23rd Infantry Regiment into action from reserve, which swept into the village with little opposition at around 5:30 p.m. Seeing that the French appeared ready to surrender they formed into column and marched into the village square with drums beating, taking the surrender of some 200 men, 10 officers and General Montignault.

=== Breakout attempt ===
The last French defenders, 400–500 men of the 1st, 2nd and 3rd Colonial Infantry together with elements of the engineers and chasseurs, tried to break-out to the south-east between the German 11th and 12th Divisions. Hit by artillery and running into the German VI Corps and V Corps command posts only a fraction of this force was able to reach French lines and join the 2nd Colonial Division at Jamoigne. After a final attack the German troops were able to take possession of Rossignol by 6:50 p.m., no pursuit was made of the French south of the Semois.

== Aftermath ==
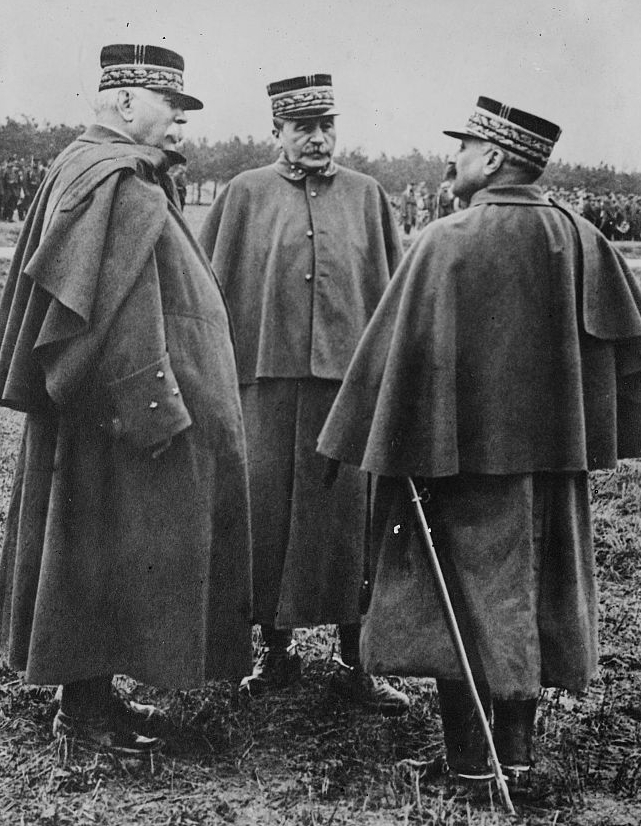
Fourth Army commander, Fernand de Langle de Cary (centre) meeting with Joffre and Adolphe Guillaumat, member of the Minister of War's cabinet

At 5:00 p.m. Lefèvre finally received direct control of the 2nd Colonial Division but by 6:00 p.m. the 7th Colonial Infantry had come under heavy attack at St Vincent. The German 22nd Infantry Brigade, amounting to five-and-a-half battalions of infantry, with supporting artillery and machine-guns pushed the ten French companies in St Vincent back, despite French superiority in artillery (48 guns to the 18 German). The French retreated by echelon to a defensive line on the road to Limes which the Germans declined to assault.

General Fernand de Langle de Cary, commanding the Fourth Army, only became aware of the extent of the defeat his troops had suffered at the end of the day. Reporting to Joffre that he had suffered a "serious check at Tintigny; all troops engaged with unsatisfactory results" he noted that because of his losses he would be unable to carry out his orders for the 23 August. The collapse of the 3rd Colonial Division had left a 12-kilometre (7 mi) gap on the front. Joffre refused to believe him and reported to Minister of War Adolphe Messimy that he had ensured the French armies were placed where "the enemy is most vulnerable" and that the troops had "the advantage of superiority", despite the fact that the French Third and Fourth armies were outnumbered. Joffre's strike against the supposedly weak German centre had failed and the armies in the Ardennes were forced to retreat, the Third Army to Verdun and the Fourth to Stenay and Sedan.

=== Casualties ===
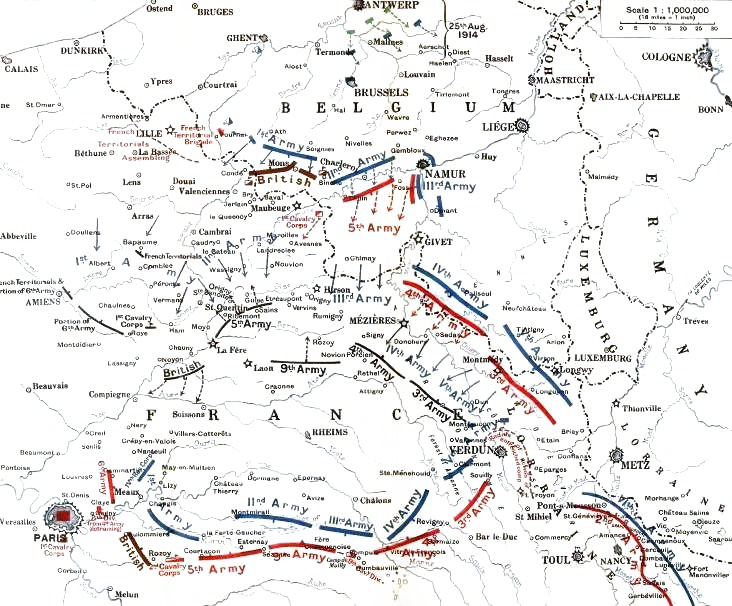
Map showing subsequent allied withdrawals to early September 1914

The 3rd Colonial Division suffered 10,520 casualties (the 2nd Colonial Division lost 868 men), the divisional artillery was wiped out and much of the transport lost. Rondony and Raffenel were killed, becoming the first French generals to lose their lives during the war. The Germans took 3,843 prisoners, including two generals and captured 39 artillery pieces, 103 caissons and six machine-guns. German losses were between 3,473 and 3,984 men from the 11th and 12th Divisions. The action has been described as one of the deadliest of the Battle of the Frontiers.

The 3rd Colonial Division was no longer a fighting force. The 1st and 2nd Colonial Infantry Regiments were destroyed as were the 2nd Colonial Field Artillery Regiment and the 3rd Chasseurs d'Afrique. The 3rd and 7th Colonial Infantry Regiments were no longer combat-effective. The latter was able to reform from two companies that had been detached to guard the corps airfield and five companies reconstituted from the original three battalions. French losses were astonishingly high with individual units suffering up to 70 per cent fatalities and most of the prisoners taken being wounded. This reflects the quality of the division, with men dying where they stood rather than surrender. The dead were buried near to where they fell – the Germans, who possessed the battlefield, in war cemeteries, the French in unmarked graves. The Colonial Corps monument at the boundary of the woods north of Rossignol was erected in 1927 to honour the French dead of the battle.

=== German reprisal killings ===
In addition to the civilians killed by German troops on 22 August at Tintigny, a further group was taken prisoner and interrogated by a German officer who afterwards had forty of the men shot. Another group of civilians were marched towards Rossignol, where, upon hearing the sound of gunfire, four were executed, the remainder were taken back to Tintigny and used as human shields against French artillery fire on 23 August. In all 63 of the inhabitants of Tintigny were killed by the German forces and the hamlet itself almost completely destroyed. Subsequent to the battle the rumour spread around German troops that the French at Rossignol had been assisted by civilians. In addition to those executed by German courts-martial at nearby Arlon, 122 civilians (108 of which were from Rossignol) were accused of involvement and executed on the orders of Colonel Richard Karl von Tessmar by telephone from Luxembourg. Two francs-tireurs captured at Les Bulles by the 157th Infantry Regiment on 23 August were shot. The executed civilians were originally buried at Arlon, their place of execution, but were disinterred in 1920 in the presence of King Albert of Belgium and committed to a purpose-built mausoleum in Rossignol. Queen Elisabeth unveiled a monument at the site in 1925.

== Orders of battle ==
=== France ===
Colonial Corps

==== 2nd Colonial Infantry Division ====
- 2nd Colonial Infantry Brigade

4th Colonial Infantry Regiment
8th Colonial Infantry Regiment

- 4th Colonial Infantry Brigade

22nd Colonial Infantry Regiment
24th Colonial Infantry Regiment

- Organic elements

1st Colonial Field Artillery Regiment
5th (Reserve) Squadron of the 6th Dragoon Regiment
Company 22/1 of the 1st Engineer Regiment

==== 3rd Colonial Infantry Division ====
- 1st Colonial Infantry Brigade

1st Colonial Infantry Regiment
2nd Colonial Infantry Regiment

- 3rd Colonial Infantry Brigade

3rd Colonial Infantry Regiment
7th Colonial Infantry Regiment

- Organic elements

2nd Colonial Field Artillery Regiment
6th (Reserve) Squadron of the 6th Dragoon Regiment
Company 22/3 of the 1st Engineer Regiment

==== Non-divisional elements ====
- 5th Colonial Infantry Brigade

21st Colonial Infantry Regiment
23rd Colonial Infantry Regiment
3rd Chasseurs d'Afrique
3rd Colonial Artillery Regiment
Companies 22/2, 22/4, 22/16, 22/31 of the 1st Engineer Regiment

=== Germany ===
VI Corps

==== 11th Infantry Division ====
- 21st Infantry Brigade

10th (1st Silesian) Grenadiers "King Frederick William II"
38th (Silesian) Fusiliers "General Field Marshal Count Moltke"

- 22nd Infantry Brigade

11th (2nd Silesian) Grenadiers "King Frederick III"
51st (4th Lower Silesian) Infantry

- 11th Cavalry Brigade

1st (Silesian) Life Cuirassiers "Great Elector"
8th (2nd Silesian) Dragoons "King Frederick III"

- 11th Field Artillery Brigade

6th (1st Silesian) Field Artillery "von Peucker"
42nd (2nd Silesian) Field Artillery

==== 12th Infantry Division ====
- 23rd Infantry Brigade

22nd (1st Upper Silesian) Infantry "Keith"
156th (3rd Silesian) Infantry

- 24th Infantry Brigade

23rd (2nd Upper Silesian) Infantry "von Winterfeldt"
62nd (3rd Upper Silesian) Infantry

- 78th Infantry Brigade

63rd (4th Upper Silesian) Infantry
157th (4th Silesian) Infantry

- 12th Cavalry Brigade

4th (1st Silesian) Hussars "von Schill"
6th (2nd Silesian) Hussars "Count Götzen"

- 44th Cavalry Brigade

Ulanen-Regiment von Katzler Nr.2 (Uhlans)
11th Mounted Rifles

- 12th Field Artillery Brigade

21st (1st Upper Silesian) Field Artillery "von Clausewitz"
57th (2nd Upper Silesian) Field Artillery

==== Non-divisional elements ====
6th Jager Battalion (2nd Upper Silesian)
3rd Machine gun detachment of the 51st (4th Lower Silesian) Infantry
6th (Silesian) Foot Artillery "von Dieskau"
6th Supply Train Group (Silesian)

== Bibliography ==
- Beasley, Major Rex W. (2007) [1933]. "Critical Analysis of the Operations of the French Colonial Corps in the Battle of the Ardennes, with Particular Attention to the Operations of the 3d Colonial Division at Rossignol". Command and General Staff School Student Papers, 1930–1936. Individual Research Papers (IR)/Command and General Staff School. Fort Leavenworth, KS: The Command and General Staff School. OCLC 462132918. Archived from the original on 19 August 2014.
- Denolle, M. (1922). La Grande Guerre Vécue – racontée – illustée par les combattants [The Great War Experience as Told and Illustrated by the Combatants] (in French). Vol. I. Paris: Lirbrairie Aristide Quillet. OCLC 718468789.
- Doughty, Robert A. (2005). Pyrrhic victory: French Strategy and Operations in the Great War. Cambridge: Harvard University Press. ISBN 978-0-674-01880-8.
- Gehin, Gérard. Livre d'or des officiers superieurs mort pour le France guerre 14–18 [Visitors' Book of the Senior Officers who Died for France in the 14–18 War (no pub. date)] (PDF). Le Souvenir français. pp. 81–86. Archived from the original (PDF) on March 13, 2014.
- Gehin, Gérard; Lucas, Jean-Pierre (2008). Dictionnaire des Généraux et amiraux Francais de la Grande Guerre [The Dictionary of French Generals and Admirals of the Great War] (in French). Vol. II. Paris: Archives et Culture. p. 478. ISBN 978-2-35077-070-3.
- Hamilton, Richard F.; Herwig, Holger H., eds. (2003). The Origins of World War I. Cambridge University Press. ISBN 978-0-521-81735-6.
- Hart, Peter (2013). The Great War: A Combat History of the First World War. Oxford: Oxford University Press. ISBN 978-0-19-997627-0.
- Horne, John N.; Kramer, Alan (2001). German Atrocities, 1914: A History of Denial. New Haven: Yale University Press. ISBN 978-0-300-08975-2.
- Philippart, Jean-Louis; Labayle, Éric (2002). Journal du commandant Jean Moreau, chef d'état-major de la 3eme division colonial [Journal of Commander Jean Moreau, Chief of staff of the 3rd Colonial Division] (in French). Parcay-sur-Vienne: Editions Anovi. ISBN 978-2-9513423-4-7.
- The Church Quarterly Review. Vol. XCIV. London: Spottiswoode & Company. 1922. p. 52. OCLC 1554673.
- Tuchman, Barbara W. (2000) [1962]. The Guns of August. London: Robinson. ISBN 978-1-84119-209-3.
- Zuber, Terence (2013). The Battle of the Frontiers: Ardennes 1914. The History Press. ISBN 978-0-7524-4424-6. OCLC 223912988.
