= Paul Leblois =

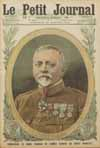
- Born: July 17, 1857; Strasbourg
- Died: August 28, 1930 Paris
- Allegiance: France
- Branch: French Army
- Service years: ~1890s-1917
- Rank: Divisional general
- Commands: 2e division d'infanterie coloniale 57th Infantry Division; Armée française d'Orient
- Conflicts: 1893 Franco-Siamese crisis World War I: Battle of Rossignol
- Awards: Legion of Honor; Médaille militaire

Paul Adolphe Leblois (July 17, 1857 – August 28, 1930) was a divisional general of the French Army who commanded the French 2nd Colonial Infantry Division and later the Armée française d'Orient during World War I.

== Early life ==
Paul Leblois was born in Bas-Rhin, Strasbourg on July 17, 1857. His father Georges-Louis Leblois was a pastor who advocated a form of Protestant liberalism. He had a brother, Louis Leblois, who was a lawyer for Alfred Dreyfus during the Dreyfus Affair, and a sister named Louise-Amélie Leblois who studied natural sciences.

== Military career ==
By the early 1890s, Leblois was serving in the French Army and had reached the rank of Captain by 1893, during the Franco-Siamese crisis. He was awarded the rank of Chevalier of the Legion of Honor in Hanoi in April 1894 for being a captain in the managing staff of France's Indo-Chinese troops. In 1903, Leblois was awarded the rank of Officier of the Legion of Honor and was by this point a lieutenant colonel in the management over France's colonial infantry.

Leblois later served as a divisional general over the 2nd Colonial Infantry Division in 1914, at the beginning of the First World War. Leblois led his 2nd Division during the Battle of Rossignol in August 1914, providing support for the 3rd Colonial Infantry Division (France). From October 1916 to February 1917, Leblois was a commander of the Armée française d'Orient, leading engagements on the Macedonian front. His command of the "AFO" was replaced by Paul François Grossetti. For his leadership, Leblois was awarded the Grand Cross of the Legion of Honor in 1926.
