= Ernest Psichari =

French author, religious thinker and soldier

Ernest Psichari TOSD
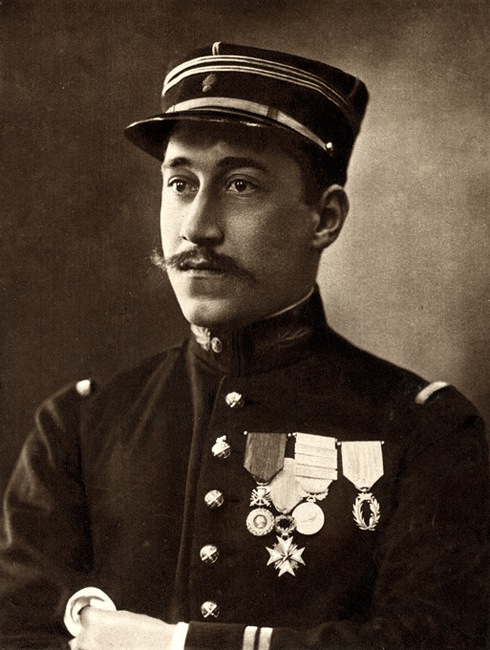
- Ernest Psichari in artillery officer's uniform
- Born: 27 September 1883; Paris, France
- Died: 22 August 1914 (aged 30); Rossignol, Belgium
- Burial place: Rossignol cemetery
- Military career
- Allegiance: France
- Branch: French Army
- Service years: 1904–1914
- Rank: Lieutenant
- Conflicts: First World War (1914)
- Other work: Noted writer on military, religious and nationalist topics

Ernest Psichari (27 September 1883 – 22 August 1914) was a French author, religious thinker and soldier. The son of noted intellectual Ioannis Psycharis and grandson of liberal writer Ernest Renan, Psichari was baptised into the Greek Orthodox faith. After a troubled upbringing which saw him attempt suicide over an unrequited love, Psichari entered the army for his national service. Enjoying military life, he re-enlisted in the ranks and transferred to the Troupes coloniales in search of adventure abroad. He saw service in the French Congo and Mauritania and wrote a number of militaristic autobiographical works that proved popular with French nationalists. Converting to Catholicism in 1913, Psichari considered becoming a priest but instead decided he could better serve his church in the army. Fighting in the defence of Belgium in August 1914 during World War I, he was killed at Rossignol during the Battle of the Frontiers.

== Early life ==
Ernest Psichari was born on 27 September 1883 in Paris. His father was the Greek-French Ioannis Psycharis, professor of Greek philology at the Ecole Pratique des Hautes Etudes and one of the leading champions of Demotic Greek. His mother was Noémi Psichari, daughter of the anti-clerical, liberal historian and philosopher Ernest Renan, one of the most famous intellectuals of 19th-century France. Born into one of the most famous republican families of France, he was baptised into the Greek Orthodox Church at the insistence of his mother, though the family had a background of agnosticism. Psichari's parents argued much; his father was concerned that his children (he had a younger brother Michel and a sister Henriette) saw too little of him and knew only their mother and maternal grandfather. Psichari's parents eventually separated just prior to the First World War. Renan died in 1892 when Psichari was nine.

Psichari grew close to contemporary intellectuals Maurice Barrès, Charles Péguy and particularly to Jacques Maritain, with whom he had a passionate friendship. At the age of 19, he fell in love with Maritain's sister Jeanne, seven years his senior. She rejected him for another and on her wedding day Psichari attempted to kill himself by an overdose of drugs. Rescued by his friend, Maurice Reclus (later a noted historian), he then attempted to shoot himself with a revolver. Reclus struggled to stop him and the weapon went off harmlessly. Afterwards, Psichari spent several days staying in run-down parts of Paris undertaking manual work before he was discovered by his family and sent to the country to recuperate.

== Military service ==
Completing his compulsory military service as an enlisted soldier, Psichari found he enjoyed the discipline so much that he re-enlisted into the 51st Infantry Regiment in 1904, a move that outraged his friends. Rising to the rank of sergeant but growing impatient with the life of a garrison soldier in the metropolitan army, he arranged a transfer to the Troupes coloniales as an artilleryman. Psichari undertook a tour of duty in the Congo in 1907 under Lieutenant Lenfant, an officer whom he came to idolise. Returning to France in 1908, he published an account of his experiences as Terres de soleil et de sommeil (Lands of the sun and sleep). This was more of an autobiography than a work of travel writing or history and some claim that the writings contain homo-erotic references. He had by now rejected thoroughly the anti-militarism of his youth and praised his army and his nation, becoming an idol of the nationalist right.

Having graduated from the Versailles military academy as a sub-lieutenant, he was posted to Mauritania in 1909, remaining there until 1912. Psichari initially feared that he would be bored in an area of the French colonies that was relatively pacified but soon grew to love the landscape and people of Mauritania. He would see action in a skirmish with tribesmen in which two of his men were killed.

A frequent speaker against Renan's "dilettantism, his antagonism to the Catholic Church [and] his opposition to the military system", Psichari was concerned that his popularity with French nationalists arose simply because he had diverged so strongly from his grandfather's views. He wrote L’Appel des armes (The Call to Arms) in 1913, a military novel that was a record of his experiences and proved immensely popular with nationalist youth. His works were said to "combine militaristic sentiments with a semimystical religious devotion".

== Conversion and death ==
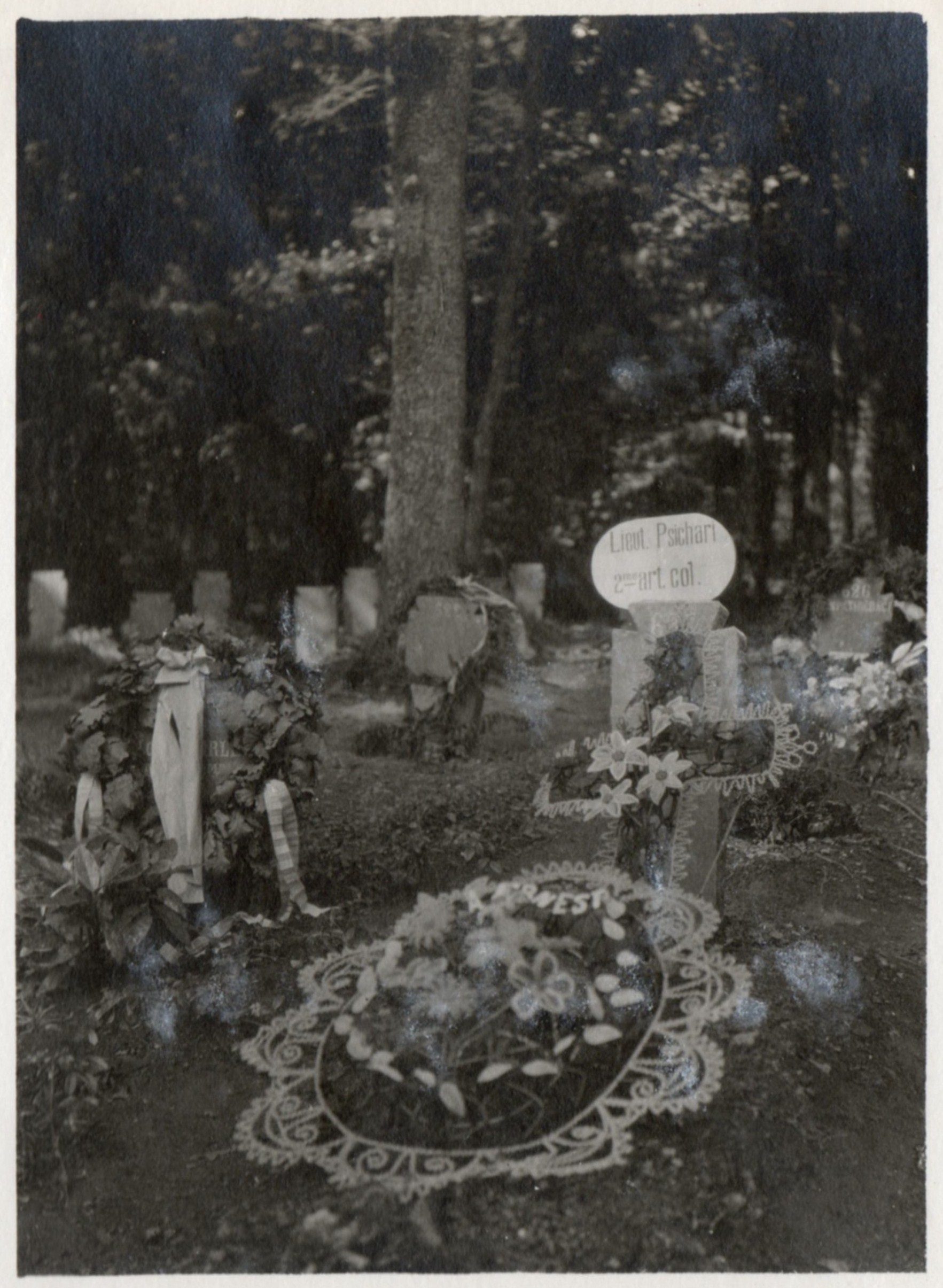
Psichari's tomb at Rossignol cemetery

As Frank Field states, he and other soldiers were impressed by the faith of Muslims when he was in North Africa, and so he turned more and more to religion, and because of that fascination and the certainty that Christianity was the most appropriate religion to the French, he converted to the Catholic faith in early 1913. His new faith placed him at odds with his former mentor Péguy, and the two cut off their ties. Psichari became a tertiary (lay) member of the Dominican Order and considered becoming a priest. Deciding he could better serve his church within the army, he instead followed it to war as a lieutenant, telling a priest at the time "we are not ready, but I have faith in the Sacred Heart". He died in the last stand of the French artillery at the Battle of Rossignol. Trapped between the German forces and the Semois River, the French gunners fought to the last, firing off the remainder of their ammunition, disabling their guns and killing their limber horses before surrendering. Psichari fell whilst defending the guns.

Psichari's brother, also in arms since 1914, died with the French army in Champagne in 1917. Psichari's autobiographical novel, Le Voyage du centurion (The voyage of the centurion), that dealt with his conversion and "retraces his pilgrimage from scepticism to an ardent faith and a total abandonment to God" was published posthumously in 1916. A further work, Les voix qui crient dans le désert : souvenirs d'Afrique (Voices crying in the wilderness: memories of Africa), was published in 1920 with a foreword by General Charles Mangin.

Following his death he was portrayed by Henri Massis, his biographer, as a supporter of the far-right Action Française leader Charles Maurras, though Maritain considered he would have later broken away from the Maurrasians as Maritain did.

== Bibliography ==
- Beasley, Major Rex W. (1933). "Critical analysis of the operations of the French Colonial Corps in the Battle of the Ardennes, with particular attention to the operations of the 3d Colonial Division at Rossignol". Command and General Staff School Student Papers, 1930-1936. Combined Arms Research Library. Archived from the original on 19 August 2014.
- EW (3 May 1919). "Ernest Psichari spokesman for young France". Vassar Miscellany News. III (49).
- Paganelli, Don Sauveur, Un petit-fils de Renan, Ernest Psichari, Saint-Raphaël : Éditions des Tablettes, 1923.
- Field, Frank (25 January 1991). British and French Writers of the First World War: Comparative Studies in Cultural History. Cambridge, UK: Cambridge University Press. ISBN 0521392772.
- Church Quarterly Review, Volumes 94-95. Spottiswoode & Company. 1922.
