= Colonial Army Corps =

- Active: June 1901 –
- Country: France
- Branch: French Army
- Type: Army Corps

The Colonial Army Corps, originally the Army Corps of Colonial Troops, is a unit of the French Army established by decree on June 11, 1901. It was composed of units from the Colonial Troops stationed in mainland France.

In 1915 the Colonial Army Corps was reorganized into the 1st Colonial Army Corps, followed by the creation of the 2nd Colonial Army Corps.

== Formation and Name Changes ==
- June 1901: Army Corps of Colonial Troops
- January 22, 1915: 1st Colonial Army Corps
- February 11, 1919: Colonial Army Corps

== Commanders of the Colonial Army Corps ==
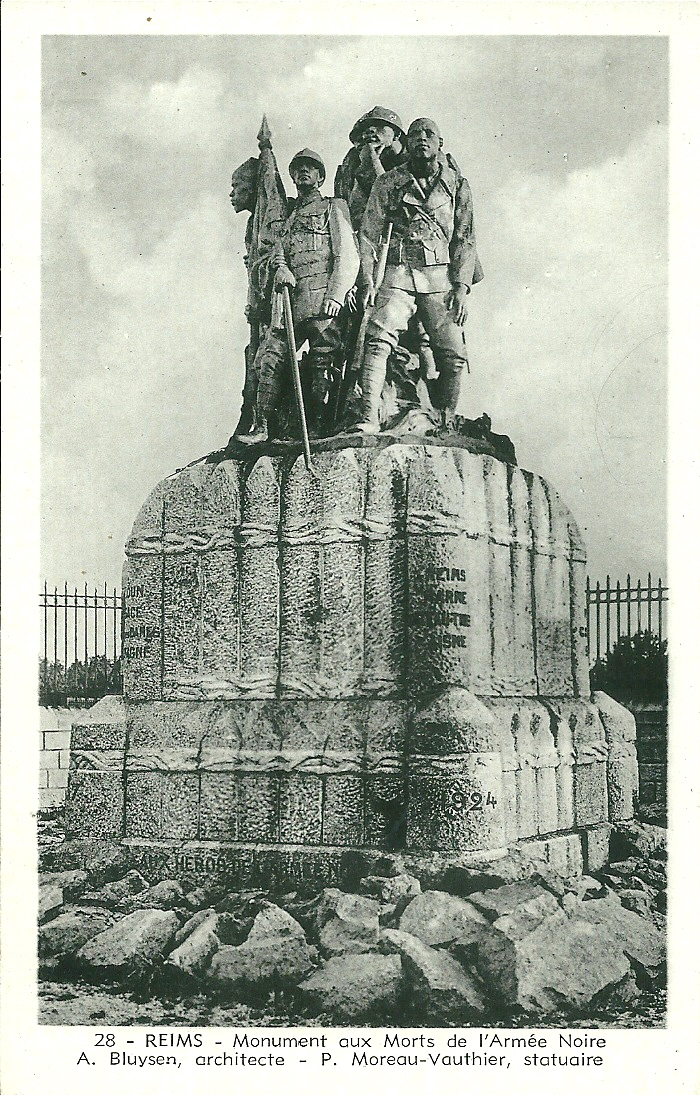
Monument in Reims (1924) honoring the "Black Army."

- 1901–1902: General Duchemin
- 1902–1904: General Dodds
- October 14, 1904: General Archinard
- September 4, 1911: General Vautier
- April 13, 1914: General Lefèvre
- January 22, 1915: General Gouraud
- April 29, 1915: General Berdoulat
- July 19, 1917 – October 15, 1924: General Mazillier
- October 17, 1924 – June 3, 1925: General Claudel
- September 2, 1939 – June 5, 1940: General Freydenberg
- June 5, 1940 – June 23, 1940: General Carles

== World War I ==
=== Composition ===
==== At Mobilization ====
- 2nd Colonial Infantry Division
- 3rd Colonial Infantry Division
- 5th Colonial Brigade (General Goullet): 21st and 23rd Colonial Infantry Regiments
- Artillery Corps (Colonel Lenfant): 3rd Colonial Artillery Regiment

=== History and Combat ===
At the outbreak of World War I, it was part of the 4th Army.

== World War II ==
The Colonial Army Corps was subordinated to the 3rd Army under General Condé.

=== Composition ===
- 22nd Reconnaissance Group
- 11th Heavy Colonial Artillery Regiment
- 2nd Infantry Division
- 56th Infantry Division
- 51st Infantry Division (Highland)
- Fortified Sector of Thionville

== Bibliography ==
- General Duchemin, "Creation of the Army Corps of Colonial Troops in France," in Les Troupes coloniales et la défense des colonies, R. Chapelot, 1905, pp. 133–148. Read online.
