= Tirailleurs indochinois =

Tirailleurs indochinois Lính tập (𠔦習)
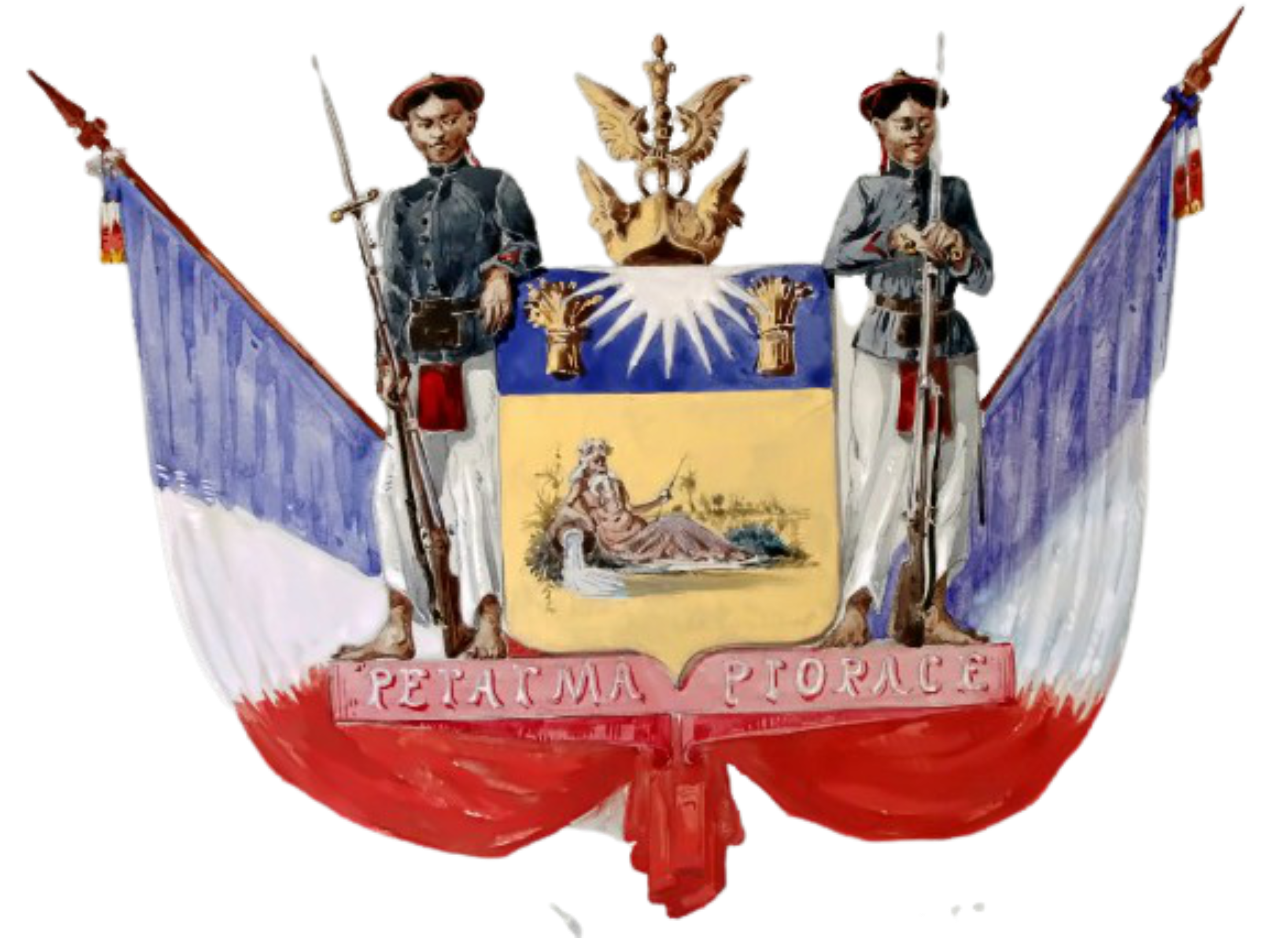
- Active: 1880–1960
- Country: 1880–1887: Cambodia; French Cochinchina; 1884–1887: Nguyễn dynasty; Annam; Tonkin; 1887–1954: French Indochina
- Allegiance: France
- Type: Tirailleurs
- Role: Military force
- Size: 1945: 22.000
- Motto(s): Per Arma Pro Pace
- Engagements: Sino-French War; Pacification of Tonkin; Boxer Rebellion; World War I; Allied intervention in the Russian Civil War; Franco-Syrian War; Rif War; Yên Bái mutiny; World War II; War in Vietnam (1945–1946); First Indochina War; Algerian War

The Tirailleurs indochinois (Vietnamese: Lính tập; Chữ Nôm: 𠔦習) were soldiers of several regiments of local ethnic Indochinese infantry organized as Tirailleurs by the French colonial authorities, initially in Vietnam from 15 March 1880. The most notable, and first established, of these units were the Tonkinese Rifles (French: Tirailleurs tonkinois, Vietnamese: Quân đoàn bộ binh Bắc Kỳ).

== History ==
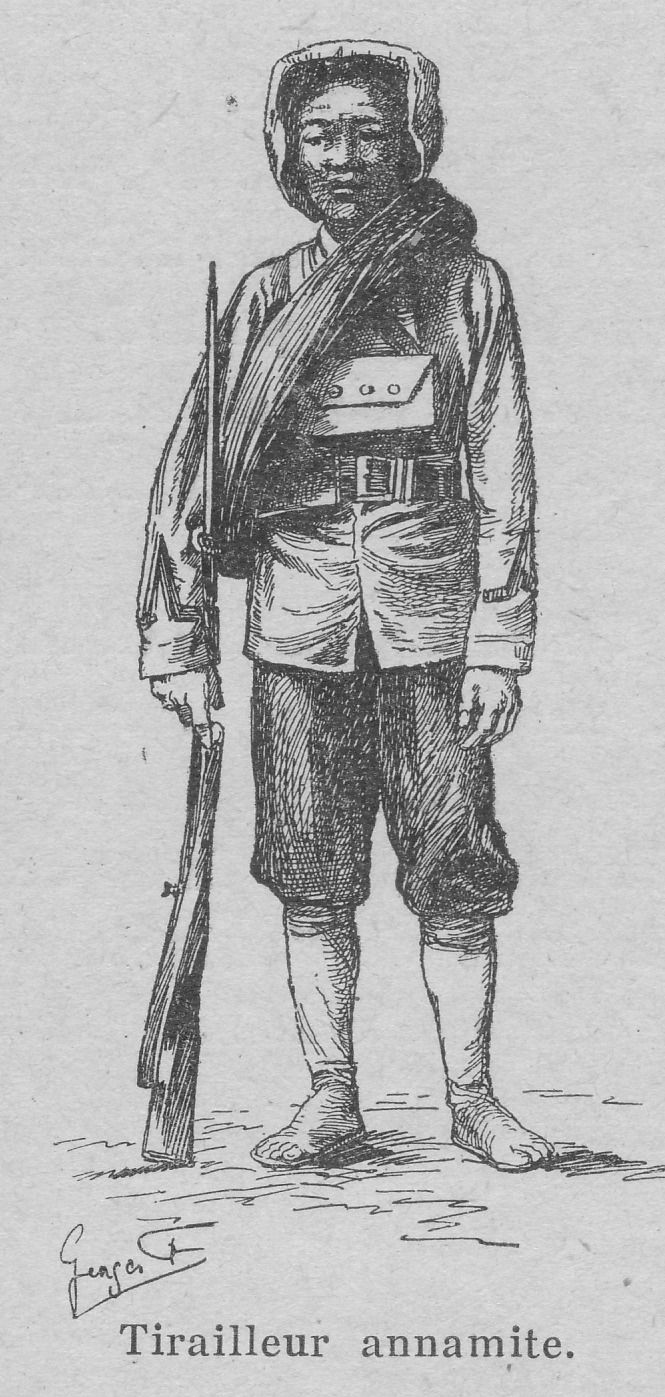
Tirailleur annamite

In the early days of these regiments the charge was often made that the tirailleurs were prone to desertion.

However under the leadership of officers seconded from the regular French Marine (subsequently Colonial) Infantry the tirailleurs became an effective corps, without which the French would have had difficulty in occupying and garrisoning their Indochinese possessions.

During World War I the French Army was initially reluctant to deploy its Indochinese units of the Troupes coloniales on the Western Front but eventually 40,000 Annamite and Cambodian tirailleurs were sent to France. The majority were employed behind the lines in guard, depot and factory-worker duties. The battalions of Indochinese riflemen who saw combat were the 7th and 21st on the Western Front, at Verdun, the Chemin des Dames, and in Champagne.

Indochinese troops of the 1st and 2nd battalions were also deployed to the Macedonian front. A further engagement took place for the 1st Battalion at Monastir, from August to November 1917, with the 122nd Infantry Division (France), and at Lake Ohrid with the 175th Infantry Regiment. 61 casualties were recorded for the 1st Battalion. The 2nd Battalion took part in the attack on Veliternë (Albania) on January 1, 1917, taking the village where it remained until April. 20 men died. At Lake Ohrid, in April 1917, the 2nd Indochinese Battalion withstood an enemy counter-attack at a cost of 35 dead.

The tirailleurs saw active service in Indochina, the Boxer Rebellion in China, the Allied intervention in Siberia between 1918–19, Syria (1920–21) and Morocco (1925–26).

On 10 February 1930 fifty tirailleurs rose in support of the Việt Nam Quốc Dân Đảng during the Yen Bai mutiny, which was quickly suppressed by loyal tirailleurs of the same regiment. This event resulted in the increased recruitment of non-Vietnamese soldiers.

In 1945 some tirailleur units fought against the Japanese occupation of Vietnam. In particular the "3e RTT" (3e régiment de tirailleurs tonkinois) offered fierce resistance but was annihilated. The six Tonkinese and Annamite tirailleur regiments then in existence were destroyed or dispersed in the course of the Japanese coup, and were not reestablished. Some tirailleur units were absorbed into the Viet Minh forces after 1945. Large numbers of Vietnamese troops did however serve in the French Union Forces during the French Indochina War (1946–1954) and the last Indochinese unit in the French Army was not disbanded until 1960. Many of them became officers of the Republic of Vietnam Military Forces after the French withdrawal.

== Regiments ==
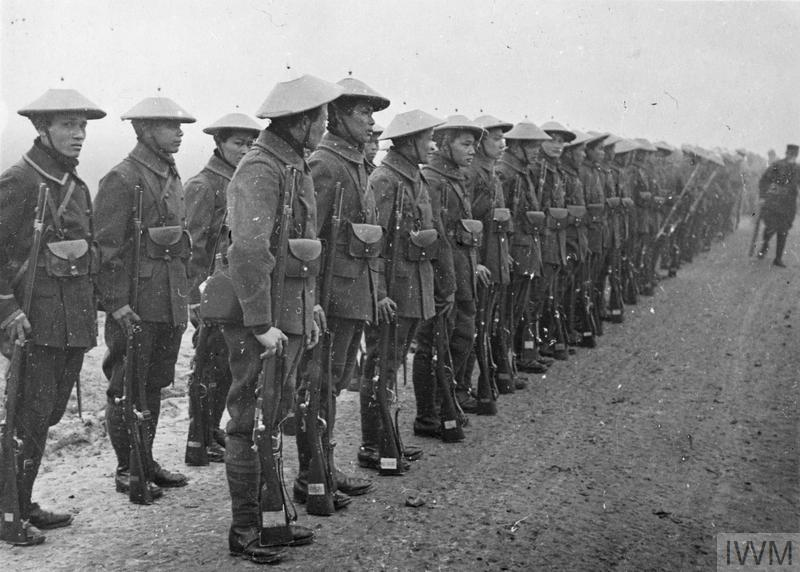
Ethnic Vietnamese soldiers circa 1916 during World War I.

The regiments were founded in each of the territories of Tonkin, Annam and Cambodia.

=== Tirailleurs tonkinois ("Tonkinese Rifles") ===
- 1er régiment de tirailleurs tonkinois
- 2e régiment de tirailleurs tonkinois
- 3e régiment de tirailleurs tonkinois
- 4e régiment de tirailleurs tonkinois
- 5e régiment de tirailleurs tonkinois (1902-1908)

=== Tirailleurs annamites ===
- 1er Régiment de tirailleurs annamites
- 2e Régiment de tirailleurs annamites
- Bataillon de tirailleurs montagnards du sud Annam

=== Tirailleurs cambodgiens ===
- Bataillon de tirailleurs cambodgiens
- Régiment de tirailleurs cambodgiens

=== Tirailleurs Tais ===
Ethnic Taï from Sip Song Chau Tai and Northern Laos.

- 1er bataillon Thaï
- 2e bataillon taï
- 3e bataillon taï

== Bibliography ==
- Jouineau, André (2009) [2009]. Officiers et soldats de l'armée française Tome 2 : 1915-1918 [Officers and Soldiers of the French Army Volume II: 1915-18]. Officers and Soldiers #12. Translated by McKay, Alan. Paris: Histoire & Collections. ISBN 978-2-35250-105-3.
- Rives, Maurice; et al. (1999). Les Linh tâp : histoire des militaires indochinois au service de la France, 1859-1960 (in French). Panazol: Lavauzelle Graphic. ISBN 2-7025-0436-1.
- Histoire militaire de l'Indochine française des débuts à nos jours (juillet 1930). Vol. 2 (2 ed.). Imprimerie d'Extrême-Orient. 1930. Histoire militaire de l'Indochine 1930..
