= 2nd Colonial Infantry Division (France) =

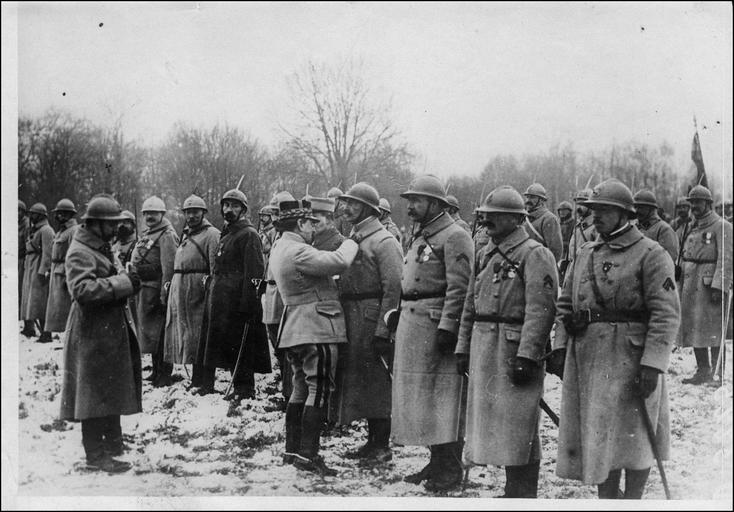
- Decoration of soldiers of the 2nd Colonial Infantry Division by General Emile-Alexis Mazillier on 22 January 1917.
- Active: Before 1901 - 1923; July 1927 - June 1940
- Country: France
- Branch: French Army
- Type: Infantry Division
- Role: Infantry
- Engagements: World War I; World War II

Commanders
- Notable commanders: Paul Leblois; Joseph Gaudérique Aymerich

The 2nd Colonial Infantry Division (French: 2e Division d'Infanterie Coloniale, 2e DIC) was a French Army formation which fought in World War I and World War II.

The division was established under another name in 1892 and gained the "2 DIC" name in 1901.

== World War I ==
At the start of World War I, the division was commanded by General Paul Leblois and composed of:

- 4e Brigade d'Infanterie Coloniale, Colonel Boudonnet (Toulon)

4e Régiment d'Infanterie Coloniale
8e Régiment d'Infanterie Coloniale

- 6e Brigade d'Infanterie Coloniale, Général Caudrelier (Marseille)

22e Régiment d'infanterie Coloniale
24e Régiment d'infanterie Coloniale

During the entire 1st World War, the Division was part of the French 1st Colonial Corps and fought in many major battles in France.

== 1927 - 1940 ==
On 1 November 1927, the 2nd Senegalese Colonial Infantry Division was recreated by transformation of the 30th infantry division.
It was stationed in Toulon, and later renamed 2nd Colonial Infantry Division.

During the Battle of France in May 1940 the division was made up of the following units:

- Régiment d'Infanterie Coloniale du Maroc (RICM) (from 15 december 1939)
- 4th Senegalese Tirailleurs Regiment
- 8th Senegalese Tirailleurs Regiment
- 72nd Reconnaissance Battalion
- 2nd Colonial Divisionary Artillery Regiment
- 202nd Colonial Heavy Artillery Regiment

The Division was first stationed in the Alps, but later moved to the North, where it fought in the Seine and Loire regions.

The Division was disbanded after the capitulation of the French Army in June 1940.
