= 3rd Light Armoured Brigade =

3^{e} Brigade Légère Blindée
- The insignia represents three crescents
- Active: 1999–2016
- Country: France
- Branch: French Army
- Type: Mechanised infantry
- Size: ~ 5,000
- Part of: CFAT
- Garrison/HQ: Clermont-Ferrand
- Motto: "Un seul but : la victoire"

The 3rd Light Armoured Brigade (French: 3^{e} Brigade Légère Blindée, 3^{e} BLB), the previous 3rd Mechanised Brigade, was a unit of the French Army.

The brigade was heir to the traditions of the 3rd Armored Division, an heir of the 3rd Algerian Infantry Division.

The 3rd Light Armoured Brigade was dissolved on 16 June 2016.

The 3rd Division was recreated on 20 June 2016 within the cadre of the reorganization of the French Army.

== History of the brigade ==
=== 3rd Algerian Infantry Division ===
The 3rd Mechanised Brigade is heir of the 3rd Algerian Infantry Division 3^{e} DIA which illustrated capability during World War II under the orders of général de Monsabert puis du général Guillaume.

=== 3rd Armoured Division ===
The 3rd Division was reconstituted in 1951 at the corps of the French Forces in Germany (French: Forces françaises en Allemagne, FFA). This was a grand unit of almost 15000 men covering the Western part of Germany and comprising three brigades:

- The 5th Mechanised Brigade at Tübingen;
- The 12th Mechanised Brigade at Offenbourg;
- The 13th Motoryzed Brigade at Konstanz

the division became the 3rd Armoured Division in 1978. Three infantry regiments, two tank regiments, two artillery regiments, one engineer regiment, and one command and support regiment. During the transformation of the FFA into FFECSA (French: forces françaises et élément civil stationnés en Allemagne) (French Forces and Civilian Element), the division was redimensioned and dissolved in 1991.

=== 3rd Mechanised Brigade ===
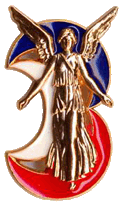
Insignia of the 3rd Mechanised Brigade 3^{e} BM.

In 1999, the 3rd Mechanised Brigade was created within the cadres of reforms of the French Army. The brigade adopted the traditions of the 3rd Armoured Division.

The brigade regrouped six tactical regimental formations with a mission to prepare for engagement in an interarm, national and multinational context.

The headquarter staff of the Mechanised Brigade garrisoned at Clermont-Ferrand on 1 July 2011.

=== 3rd Light Armoured Brigade ===
On 18 March 2014, the brigade became designated as 3rd Light Armoured Brigade. This formation counted at that date 5 regiments with an effectif of 5000 men.

Following the modeling presentation of the French Army in 2016, the brigade disappeared, the headquarter staff at Clermont-Ferrand was retaken by the headquarter staff of the 4th Aero-Combat Brigade (4^{e} BAC), newly created, and the regiments integrated in the following brigades

- 1^{er} RIMa d'angoulème: 9^{e} BIMa de Poitiers

- 126^{e} RI de Brive: 9^{e} BIMa de Poitiers

- 92^{e} RI de Clermont: 2^{e} BB de Strasbourg

- 68^{e} RAA de la Valbonne:7^{e} BB de Besançon

- 31^{e} RG de Castelsarrasin: did not join a brigade, directly subordinated to the 3rd Division

== Composition until 2009 ==
Besides of the 31st Engineer Regiment (French: 31^{e} Régiment du génie, 31^{e} RG), the 3rd Mechanised Brigade consisted of the following units from 1999 to 2009 :

- 1^{er} Régiment d'infanterie de marine, 1^{er} RIMa
- 92nd Infantry Regiment (French: 92^{e} Régiment d'infanterie, 92^{e} RI)
- 126^{e} Régiment d'infanterie, 126^{e} RI
- Company anti-tank (CAC)
- 68th Artillery Regiment (French: 68^{e} régiment d'artillerie, 68^{e} RA)
- Command and Transmission Company

== Composition since 2009 ==
- The 3rd Mechanised Brigade counted 7000 in:
- 1^{er} Régiment d'infanterie de marine de Angoulême;
- 126^{e} Régiment d'infanterie de Brive-la-Gaillarde;
- 92^{e} régiment d'infanterie de ligne de Clermont-Ferrand;
- 68^{e} régiment d'artillerie d'afrique de La Valbonne;
- 31^{e} régiment du génie de Castelsarrasin.

== Heraly & Traditions ==
=== Origin ===
It was under the signs of Latin traditions that général de Monsabert wanted to place the 3rd Algerian Infantry Division 3^{e} DIA during creation on 1 May 1943.

The insignia of "Victory" (French: La Victoire) of Cirta (province of Numidia, today Constantine (provence in Algeria)) is supported by three crescents representing the Muslims, which composed the majority of the division, allied to the "métros" (blue white red).Origin of the insignia, La Victoire

The "Victory" (French: La Victoire) was a Roman Goddess protector of the Emperors that the Legio III Augusta de Cirta particularly venerated. She was found within a search at Constantine in the 19th century.

=== Emblem & insignia ===
The units of the 3rd Mechanised Brigade bore the shoulder insignia of 3 tricolor crescents on champ d'azur.

The 3 crescents, formed themselves a styled "3", symbolizing the union in 1943 of the Muslim volunteers (the crescents) and metropole (the three colors) for the Liberation of France.

== Motto ==
The motto of the 3rd Brigade was : "Un seul but : La victoire" which translated to "One purpose : La victoire".

== See also ==
- Moroccan Division
