= 126th Infantry Regiment (France) =

126st Infantry Regiment
- 126^{e} Régiment d'Infanterie
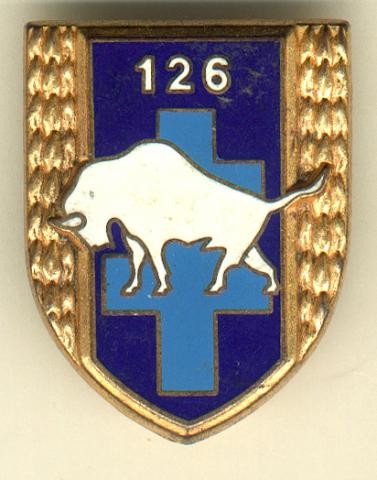
- Regimental insignia
- Active: August 1793 - present
- Country: France
- Branch: French Army
- Type: Infantry
- Part of: 9th Marine Infantry Brigade; 1st Division
- Mottos: "Fier et vaillant" (Proud and valiant).
- Engagements: French Revolutionary War; Napoleonic Wars; World War I World War II; Mali War: Operation Barkhane

The 126th Infantry Regiment is a regiment of the French Army. It was first constituted during the French Revolution.

== History ==
=== French Revolution and First French Empire ===
- 1793 : creation of 126th battle demi-brigade (French: 126^{e} demi-brigade de bataille, 126^{e} DBB).
- 1793 - 1796 : creation of the 126th battle demi-brigade, from the 2nd battalion of the 62nd Infantry Regiment (French: 62^{e} Régiment d'Infanterie), merged from two revolutionary units, the 2nd Volunteer Battalion of Ain (French: 2^{e} Bataillon de Volontaires de l'Ain) and the 3rd Volunteer Battalion of Nièvre (French: 3^{e} Bataillon de Volontaires de la Nièvre).
- 1795: Quiberon
- 1796 in France : the unit was incorporated into the 99th Infantry Regiment.
- 1810 : creation of the 126th Line Infantry Regiment (French: 126^{e} Régiment d'Infanterie de Ligne, 126^{e} RI) from the 5th Infantry Regiment (French: 5^{e} Régiment d'Infanterie, 5^{e} RI) and the 1st battalion of the 8th Infantry Regiment (French: 8^{e} Régiment d'Infanterie) of the Kingdom of Holland, during the annexation of Holland.
- 1812: the regiment took part in the campaign of Russia:
  - Smoliany, Borisow
  - November 26–29, 1812: Battle of Berezina where the regiment as a whole covered the unfolding of the Grande Armée.
- 1813 in France: incorporation of the remainder of the regiment into the 123rd Infantry Regiment (French: 123^{e} Régiment d'Infanterie, 123^{e} RI).

=== Second French Empire ===
- 1870 : defend Paris.
- May 16, 1871 in France : creation of the 126 Line Infantry Regiment formed with the 19th Provsionary Infantry Regiment.
- April 4, 1872 : a decree of the President of the Republic constituted officially the regiment which was designated as 126th Infantry Regiment, composed of four battalions of four companies.

=== Third Republic ===
- 1874: garrison at Lyon.
- 1881 to 1896: campaigns of North African and Madagascar.
- 1907, the regiment left Toulouse and arrived in garrison at Brive-la-Gaillarde.

=== WWI ===
- August 1914 in France: gave formation to the 326th Infantry Regiment (French: 326^{e} Régiment d'Infanterie, 326^{e} RI). Unfolding of the Third Army and Fourth Army: Saint-Médard, Florenville (August 22–23), Carignan. First Battle of the Marne, September 5 to 13: Châtel-Raould, Courdemanges.
- 1915 :
  - Meuse and Argonne : Regniéville, Réménauville, Wooden Forest d'Ailly
- 1916 :
  - Battle of Verdun - Marre-Charny.
- 1917 :
  - Champagne : Maison-de-Champagne (March 8–12), Auberive (April 17).
- 1918 :
  - Italian front : Austrian offensive of June 15, Piave offensive

=== Interwar period ===
The 126^{e} RI was in garrison at Brive-la-Gaillarde in January 1939, and recalled to apply the "barrage plan" in the Pyrénées-Orientales.

=== WWII ===
- The regiment showed its prowess in June 1940 in trying to halt the German offensives, marching a record 350 km in two weeks.
- August 5, 1940 : dissolution.
- 1944 : 126th Infantry Regiment. Reconstituted officially on October 15, 1944 in France. The regiment was reconstituted in 1944 from marquis of Corrèze and Périgord and participated in the liberation of Alsace, then entered the Black Forest. In January 1945, the 126th Infantry Regiment was integrated into the First Army, which was first at the disposition of the 2nd Brigade of the 1st Free French Division 1^{re} DFL, where the 126th reinforced the 2nd Brigade during the period of the defensive mounted on Strasbourg, and the surveillance of left wing of the River Rhine. Then, with the 2nd Moroccan Infantry Division, and participating with the 9th Colonial Infantry Division (9^{e} DIC) to campaign battles, combat of Karlsruhe, Ruppur, Rastadt with the 6th and 23rd Regiments d'Infanterie Coloniale.

=== 1945 to present ===
- 1946 : dissolution.
- February 1, 1946 in France : creation of the 126th Infantry Regiment.
- In Algeria from 1947 to 1948, the regiment was designated as a center of instruction for that theatre.
- Assigned to the 15th Infantry Division; it received a number of U.S. equipment from World War II, including machine pistol types used in Indochina and Algeria.
- Professionalized in 1998, in the respective garrison, the regiment was attached to the 3rd Light Armoured Brigade.
- The regiment was part of the United Nations Interim Force in Lebanon (UNIFIL) in Lebanon in 1984/1985 then also in 1992 with the 5th Chasseur Regiment (fr:5e régiment de chasseurs à cheval) of Périgueux.
- Conducted operations in Bosnia and Herzegovina after 1992.
- Conducted operations in Lebanon in 2001.
- Conducted operations in Kosovo in 2011 and 2004.
- Conducted operations in Afghanistan in 2002, 2006, 2008, 2010 as part of the International Security Assistance Force (ISAF). On February 29, 2008 in Afghanistan it instructed the Afghan National Army (ANA).
- Conducted operations in the Ivory Coast in 2001, 2003, 2004, 2005 and in 2008 during Opération Licorne.
- Conducted operations in the Central African Republic in 2006, 2011, 2012, 2014.
- Took part in Operation PAMIR in Surobi, Afghanistan from July to December 2010 as the Groupement tactique interarmes de Kapisa (Combined arms tactical group Kapisa).
- Permanently part of Operation Vigipirate, anti-terrorist operations, when stationed in France
- April 1, 1946 in France: creation of the 126th Infantry Battalion.

== Traditions ==
=== Insignia of the 126^{e} RI ===
White Buffalo since 1937, on the background of a blue Cross of Lorraine since 1944.

Lieutenant-colonel Godefroy, regimental commander of the 126^{e} RI endowed the regiment with an insignia featuring the ruins of Oradour, to evoke the 134th Infantry Regiment (French: 134^{e} Régiment d'Infanterie, 134^{e} RI) which was integrated to the 126^{e} RI in October 1945.

The actual insignia of the regiment was endowed by colonel Mestelan, regimental commander from 1979 to 1981.

=== Regimental Colors ===
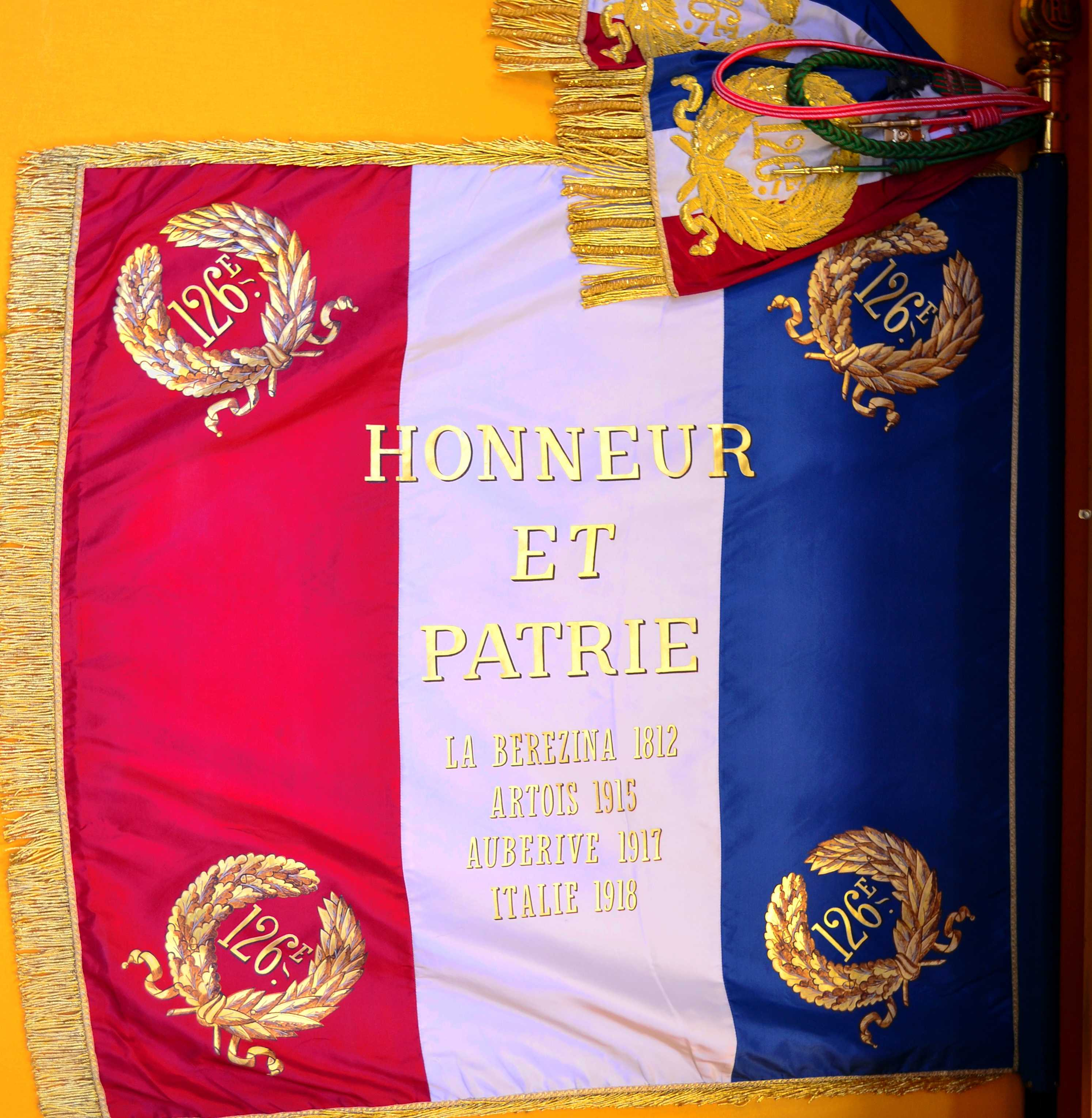
5th Regimental Colors of the 126^{e} RI.

=== Decorations ===
The regimental colors of the 126^{e} RI are decorated with:

- Croix de guerre 1914-1918 with :
  - 2 bronz palms ( 2 citations at the orders of the armed forces)
- Croix de la Valeur militaire with:
- 1 bronz palm (November 23, 2011)
- 1 palm (June 26, 2013)

Fourragere:

- Fourragere with colors of the croix de guerre 1914-1918 and colors of the croix de la Valeur militaire.

=== Honours ===
==== Battle Honours ====
- Bérézina 1812
- Artois 1915
- Auberive 1917
- Italie 1918

== Regimental commanders ==
- Chef de brigade Marillac
- 1810 - 1813 : colonel Dumoulin
- 1870: colonel Neltner
- 1870 - 1871 : lieutenant-colonel Duban
- 1871 - 1873 : colonel Voynant
- 1873 - 1877 : colonel Denuc
- 1877 - 1878 : colonel Bergeron
- 1878 : colonel de Saint-Mars
- 1878 - 1881 : colonel Doumenjou
- 1881 - 1885 : colonel Bournenfou
- 1885 - 1887 : colonel Desfrancois de Ponchalon
- 1887 - 1894 : colonel Montagne
- 1894 - 1997 : colonel Roget
- 1897 - 1906 : colonel de la Brousse de Veyrazet
- 1906 - 1908 : colonel Roustan
- 1908 - 1913 : colonel Chandezon
- 1913 - 1914 : colonel Dubois
- 1914 - 1915 : lieutenant-colonel Laporte
- 1915 : lieutenant-colonel Bressan
- 1915 - 1918 : lieutenant-colonel Labourdette
- 1918 : lieutenant-colonel Bontemps
- 1918 - 1919 : lieutenant-colonel Cholet
- 1919 - 1926 : lieutenant-colonel Larrieu
- 1926 - 1928 : colonel Tixier
- 1928 - 1930 : lieutenant-colonel Foures
- 1930 - 1931 : colonel Sonnerat
- 1931 - 1934 : colonel Baille
- 1934 - 1936 : colonel Vital
- 1936 - 1938 : colonel Papillon
- 1938 - 1940 : colonel Duche
- 1940 : colonel Donnat
- 1944 - 1945 : commandant Passemard
- 1945 - 1946 : colonel Godefroy
- 1946 - 1947 : chef de Bataillon Lagasquie
- 1947 - 1948 : chef de Bataillon Basseres
- 1948 - 1950 : chef de Bataillon Dumas
- 1950 - 1952 : chef de Bataillon Habert
- 1952 - 1954 : lieutenant-colonel de Martin du Tyrac de Marcellus
- 1954 - 1956 : lieutenant-colonel Helme-Guizon
- 1956 - 1958 : colonel Henry
- 1958 : colonel Parisot
- 1958 - 1961 : colonel Gueneau
- 1961 - 1963 : colonel Galle
- 1963 : chef de bataillon Toulouse
- 1964 : chef de bataillon Pellabeuf
- 1964 - 1965 : colonel Audibert
- 1965 - 1967 : colonel du Bois de Gaudusson
- 1967 - 1969 : colonel Lacoste
- 1969 - 1971 : lieutenant-colonel Blanquefort
- 1971 - 1973 : colonel Burgard
- 1973 - 1975 : colonel Goerger
- 1975 - 1977 : colonel Fregiere
- 1977 - 1979 : colonel de la Moriniere
- 1979 - 1981 : colonel Mestelan
- 1981 - 1983 : colonel Castagne
- 1983 - 1985 : colonel Langlois
- 1984 - 1985 : colonel Anglade
- 1985 - 1987 : colonel Rozec
- 1987 - 1989 : colonel Brousse
- 1989 - 1991 : colonel Renault
- 1991 - 1993 : colonel Bresse
- 1993 - 1995 : colonel Seguret
- 1995 - 1997 : colonel Beauval
- 1997 - 1999 : colonel Martin
- 1999 - 2001 : colonel Herbert
- 2001 - 2003 : colonel Lesimple
- 2003 - 2005 : colonel Didier
- 2005 - 2007 : colonel Barnay
- 2007 - 2009 : colonel Malassinet
- 2009 - 2011 : colonel Goisque
- 2011 - 2013 : colonel Secq
- 2013 - 2015 : colonel Ponchin
- 2015 - 2017 : colonel Mollard
- 2017 - 2019 : colonel Perot
