= 11th Marine Artillery Regiment =

- 11^{e} Régiment d'Artillerie de Marine.
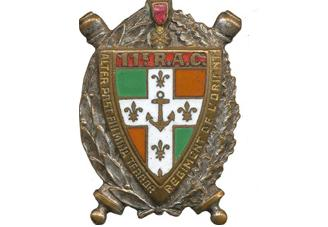
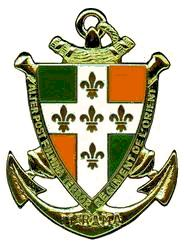
- Regimental Insignia of the 11^{e} R.A.C; Regimental Insignia of the 11^{e} R.A.Ma
- Active: 1785 1914 – 1946 1951 – present
- Country: France
- Branch: Marine Troops; French Army
- Type: Regiment
- Role: Artillery; Amphibious warfare Reconnaissance; Anti-aircraft warfare
- Part of: 9th Marine Infantry Brigade; 1st Division
- Garrison/HQ: Saint-Aubin-du-Cormier, France
- Nickname: Regiment of the Orient
- Mottos: Alter post fulmina terror "L'autre terreur après la foudre" (Fr) "The other Terror after Bolts of Lightning" (Eng)
- Colors: Red and blue
- Anniversaries: Bazeilles
- Engagements: World War I World War II; Lebanese Civil War: Multinational Force in Lebanon; Gulf War; War on terror (2001–present): War in Afghanistan (2001–2021)
- Battle honours: Lützen 1813; Mexique 1838–1863; Sébastopol 1855; Sontay Lang Son 1883–1884; Dahomey 1892; Madagascar 1895; Champagne 1915–1918; La Somme 1916; Koweït 1990–1991

Insignia
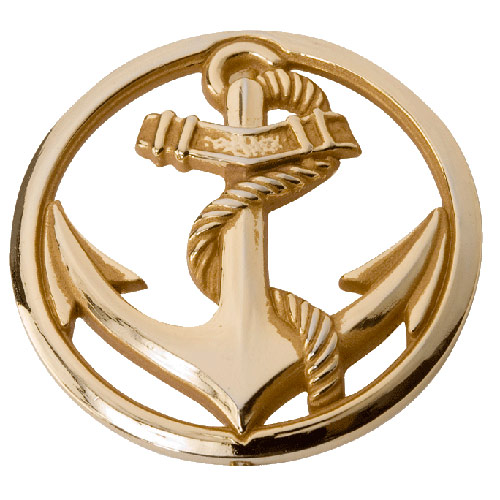
- Beret badge of the Troupes de Marine
- Abbreviation: 11^{e} RAMa

The 11th Marine Artillery Regiment (France) (French: 11^{e} Régiment d'Artillerie de Marine, 11^{e} RAMa) is an artillery regiment of the French Army. The regiment constitutes the fire support unit of the 9th Marine Infantry Brigade. The regiment employs around 950 men, fielding TRF1 155mm howitzers and MO-120-RT-61 120mm mortars. The regiment was founded in a third operational phase in 1951.

== Organic role ==
The 11^{e} RAMa is organically attached to the 9th Marine Infantry Brigade (9^{e} B.I.Ma), where the regiment fulfills the role of fixed artillery fire support. The regiment nevertheless a highly mobile unit, trained for amphibious warfare since initial formation.

== Creation and different nominations since 1785 ==
- In 1785: creation at Port-Louis, Morbihan of Morbihan of the Regiment of the Orient (French: Régiment de l’Orient). The 11^{e} RAMa conserved the motto «Alter Post Fulmina Terror», « The other Terror after Bolts of Lightning » which resides on the insignia.
- In 1919: the 11th Mixed Malagasy Colonial Artillery Regiment (French:11^{e} Régiment d'Artillerie Coloniale Mixte Malgache) sees daylight.
- In 1924: the mixed regiment became the Autonomous Colonial Artillery Group of the Levant then was designated as Colonial Artillery Regiment of the Levant R.A.C.L (French: Colonial Artillery Regiment of the Levant).
- On 5 May 1929: creation at Lorient of the 11th Colonial Artillery Regiment, 11^{e} R.A.C; derived of the 1st Colonial Artillery Regiment, 1^{e} R.A.C.Implanted in Brittany land, the 11th Colonial Artillery Regiment was formed from cadres returning from all the colonies and of a majority of Malagazy Bigor (English: term for marine artillery specialists of the French Army).
- In 1932: the regiment was designated as 11th Heavy Hippomobile Colonial Artillery Regiment. The regiment was armed by the old 155mm Scheider and the old long range 105mm series, mainly the artillery cannons of World War I. In 1939, the regiment ascended powerfully and was seen brought up to maximum operational capability within staffs and materials as of 1939.
- 1940: disappeared, the artillery depot takes charge of participating in combat operations in defense of the city of Lorient. Several officers and Bigors were lost to combat operations along the five roads of Guidel in June 1940.
- In October 1945: the 11th Colonial Artillery Regiment, 11^{e} R.A.C was recreated from the Colonial Artillery Regiment of the Levant R.A.C.L, artillery regiment veteran of the campaigns of Italy, the disembarking in Provence and numerous combat operations in the Rhodanien couloirs and until reaching Germany. The regiment was stationed in the region of Bad Kreuznach.
- On 15 February 1946: the regiment was dissolved.
- On 1 April 1951: the 1st Colonial Artillery Regiment 1^{e} R.A.C of Melun enacted the 1st Group of the 11th Marine Artillery Regiment. Starting from 1955, the regiments formed artillery specialists destined for North Africa and was designated as Instruction Center of the 11th Colonial Artillery Regiment in 1958. Thousands of men were formed within the ranks and specialties prior rejoining operational units in Algeria.
- In June 1963: the regiment was redesignated as 11th Marine Artillery Regiment.

== History since 1813 ==
The 1st Colonial Artillery Regiment 1^{e} R.A.C of Melun enacted the 1st Group of the 11th Marine Artillery Regiment.

The 1^{e} R.A.C was twice subdivided into sub units designated "11th Colonial Artillery Regiment"; the "Colonial" units are now named Troupes de marine. The 11^{e} RAMa thus maintained the motto Alter Post Fulmina Terror ("The other Terror after Bolts Lightning").

The current regiment was founded in 1951 and was renamed 11^{e} RAMa in June 1963. In 1979, the regiment took garrison in Camp La Lande d'Ouée near Saint-Aubin-du-Cormier.

=== Campaigns ===
Campaign Participation Engagement
( 1813–1918 )

- 1813 : Lützen
- 1838: Pastry War
- 1863 : Mexique
- 1854–1855 : Sébastopol
- 1883–1884 : Sontay Lang Son
- 1892–1894 : Dahomey
- 1895 : Madagascar
- 1915 : Champagne
- 1916 : La Somme
- 1918 : Second Battle of the Marne

Campaign Participation Engagement
( 1940–1990 )

- 1940 : World War II
- 1956–1961 : Algeria
- 1978–1980 : Opération Tacaud
- 1982–1983 : Lebanon, Multinational Force in Lebanon
- 1983–1984 : Chad, Operation Manta
- 1990 : Kuwait, Gulf War

Campaign Participation Engagement
( 1993–1999 )

- 1993–2000 : Balkans
- 1994 : Rwanda, Opération Turquoise
- 1995 : Comores
- 1997 : Central African Republic
- 1997 : Albania

Campaign Participation Engagement
( 2000–Present )

- 2002–2004 : Côte d'Ivoire
- 2003 : Afghanistan
- 2003 : Lebanon
- 2003 : DR Congo
- 2003–2011 : Afghanistan
- 2004–2005 : Côte d'Ivoire
- 2005 : Tchad
- 2005 : Kosovo
- 2005 : Réunion with 2^{e} RPIMa
- 2006 : Réunion
- 2009–2011 : Afghanistan
- 2013 : Mali

=== Overseas operations ===
The 11^{e} RAMa has been deployed overseas more times than any other artillery unit of the French Army. From 1978 to 1980, the regiment was involved in Opération Tacaud, in Chad. It took part in the battle of Ati in support of 2 combat companies of the 3rd Marine Infantry Regiment and a squadron of the 1^{e} REC. On 5 March 1979, during the battle of Abéché where the regiment supported the same marine infantry company of the 3^{e} RIMa and a squadron of the RICM, the same artillery battery exercised a horizontal firing round series with 105HM2 howitzers. From 1984 to 1985, the regiment was involved in Opération Manta.

=== Lebanese Civil War (1975–1990) ===
The regiment partook in various peacekeeping missions in Lebanon on numerous yearly designated occasions. From 1983 to 1984, the regiment integrated the corps of the Multinational Force in Lebanon during the Lebanese Civil War along with the 1st Parachute Chasseur Regiment, the 1st Parachute Hussard Regiment and the 31^{e} Brigade which included the Operational Group of the Foreign Legion, the 1st Foreign Cavalry Regiment, the 2nd Foreign Infantry Regiment and the 17th Parachute Engineer Regiment.

=== Gulf War (1990–1991) ===
The regiment was engaged in the Gulf War in 1991 part of Opération Daguet along with 1st Foreign Cavalry Regiment, the 2nd Foreign Parachute Regiment, the 2nd Foreign Infantry Regiment, the 6th Foreign Engineer Regiment, French paratroopers regiments including components of the 1st Parachute Hussard Regiment, the 17th Parachute Engineer Regiment and other airborne contingents.

=== Foreign operations (1991–2001) ===
The 11^{e} RAMa was engaged in ex-Yugoslavia from 1993 to 2000, and in Opération Turquoise in 1994, in Rwanda. It then intervened in the Comoros.

=== Global war on terror (2001–present) ===
Presently, the 11^{e} RAMa is involved in Opération Licorne in Côte d'Ivoire; in the current War in Afghanistan with the French forces in Afghanistan, notably the GTIA Kapisa; in Lebanon with Opération Baliste; in Kosovo and in Mali (Operation Serval and Operation Barkhane).

== Organization ==
The 11^{e} R.A.Ma is composed of 900 artillery marines articulated in 7 Artillery batteries:

- 1 command and logistics artillery battery.
- 3 ground artillery batteries equipped with CAESER and 120mm type mortars.
- 1 Ground-to-Air artillery battery with missiles and 20mm cannon.
- 1 artillery renseignement brigade battery.
- 2 artillery intervention reserve batteries destined to reinforce in times of peace, the operational capacities of the regiment.

=== Part of Equipment ===
- (16) 120 mm type mortars
- (56) VAB equipped with mortars and 20mm type cannons
- (8) CAESAR

== Traditions ==
=== Insignias ===
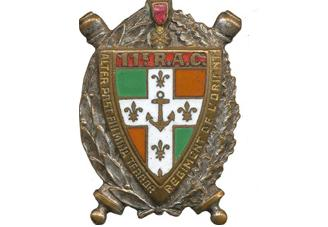
Insignia of the 11^{e} R.A.C

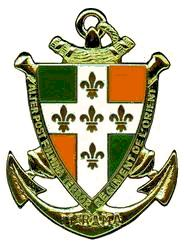
Insignia of the 11^{e} R.A.Ma

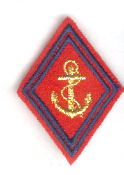
Shoulder Insignia

=== Regimental Colors ===
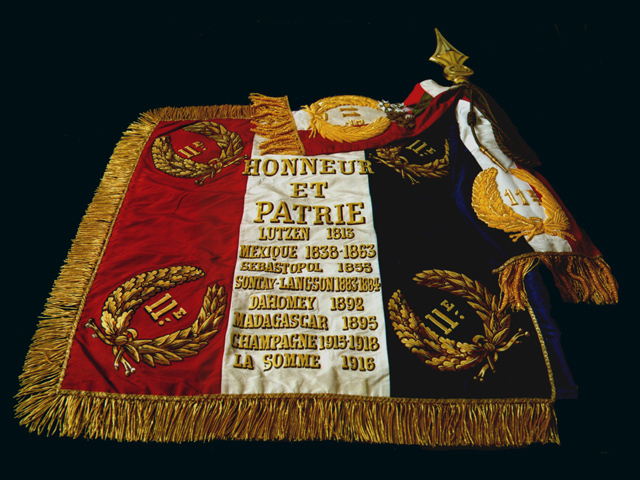
The Regimental Colors of the 11^{e} Régiment d'Artillerie de Marine, 11^{e} R.A.Ma

=== Decorations ===
The Regimental Colors of the 11th Marine Artillery Regiment 11^{e} RAMa is decorated with:

- Légion d'honneur on 20 May 1910
- Croix de guerre 1914–1918 with:
  - 2 palms ( cited twice in 1916 and 1918 at the orders of the armed forces)
- Fourragère with:
  - colors of la croix de guerre 1914–1918.
- Two artillery batteries with :
  - 1972 citation at the orders of the armed forces
  - 1978 citation at the orders of the armed forces
- Croix de guerre des théâtres d'opérations extérieures with
  - 1 palm ( the regiment for engagement in Kuwait in Opération Daguet, 1990 )
- Croix de la Valeur militaire on May 4, 2013 with:
  - 1 palm ( cited at the orders of the armed forces for service in Afghanistan )
- Croix de la Valeur militaire on June 12, 2014 with:
  - 1 palm ( cited at the orders of the armed forces for service in Mali)
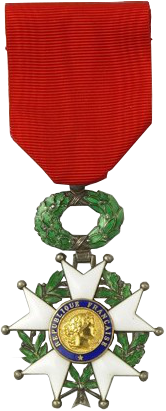
Legion of Honneur

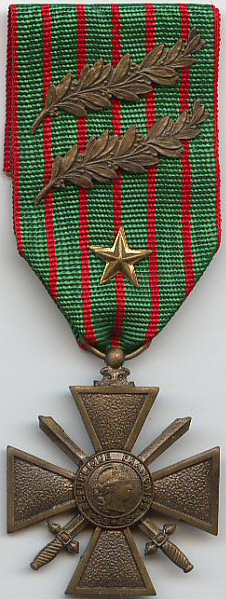
Croix de guerre 1914-1918 with 2 palms

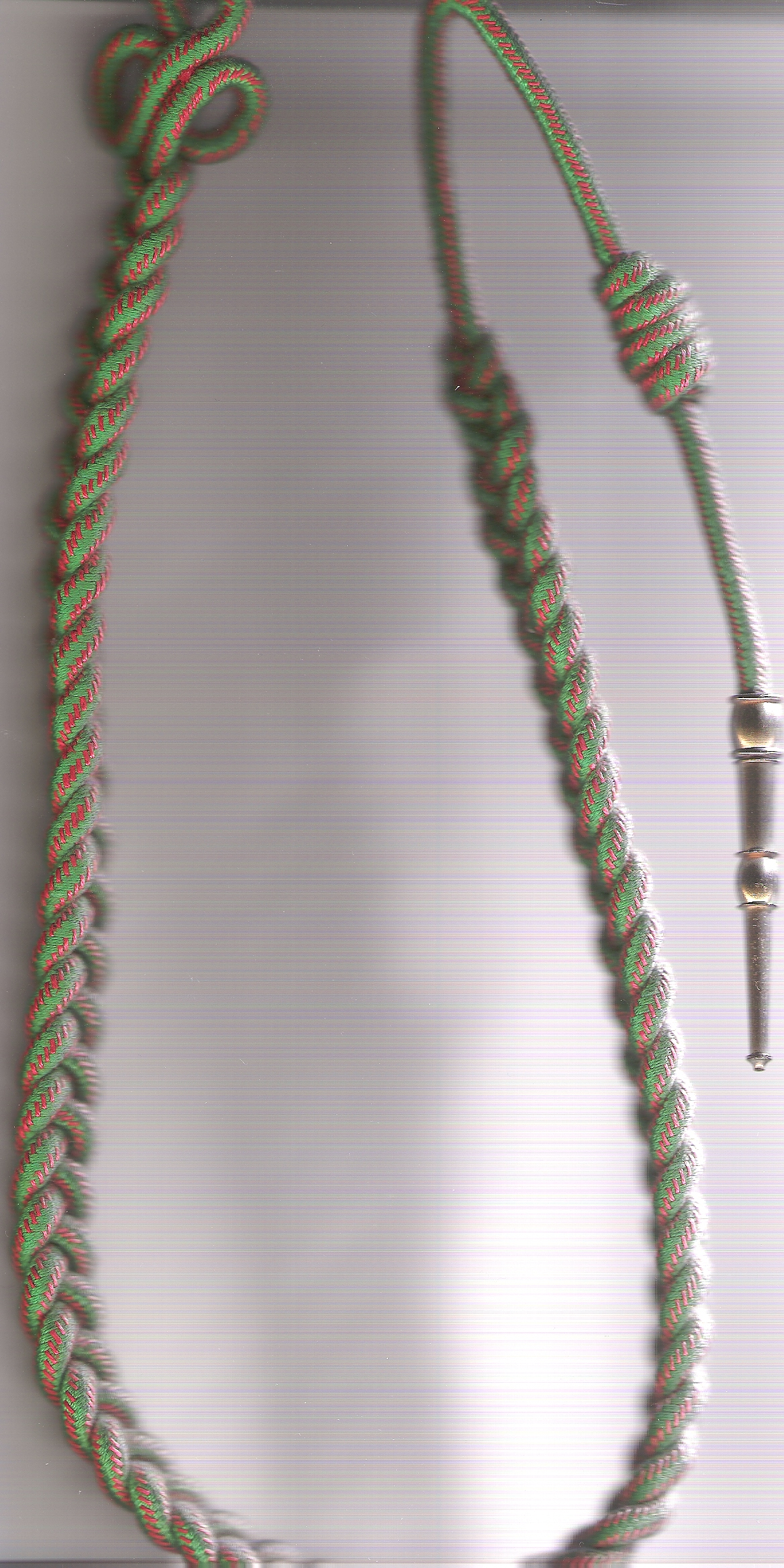
fourragère with colors of croix de guerre 1914-1918.

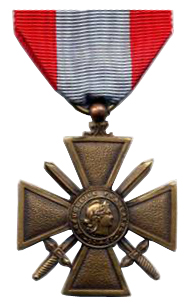
Croix de guerre des théâtres d'opérations extérieures with 1 palm

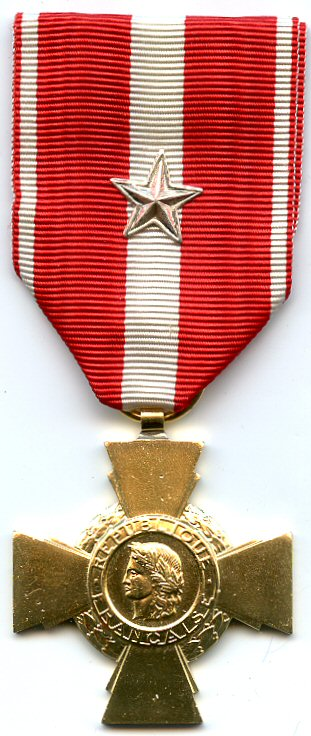
Croix de la Valeur militaire

=== Honors ===
==== Battle Honors ====
- Lützen 1813;
- Mexique 1838–1863;
- Sébastopol 1855;
- Sontay Lang Son 1883–1884;
- Dahomey 1892;
- Madagascar 1895;
- Champagne 1915–1918;
- La Somme 1916.
- Koweït 1990–1991

== Regimental Commanders ==
- 1982 – 1984 : colonel Barthe
- 1984 – 1986 : colonel Desson
- 1986 – 1988 : colonel Schill
- 1988 – 1990 : colonel Lang
- 1990 – 1992 : colonel Novak
- 1992 – 1994 : colonel Lanclume
- 1994 – 1996 : colonel Laberibe
- 1996 – 1998 : colonel Bonnet
- 1998 – 2000 : colonel Frétille
- 2000 – 2002 : colonel Durand
- 2002 – 2004 : colonel Soriano
- 2004 – 2006 : colonel Royal
- 2006 – 2008 : colonel Metz
- 2008 – 2010 : colonel Goguenheim
- 2010 – 2012 : colonel Laval
- 2012 – 2014 : colonel Métayer
- 2014 – 201x: lieutenant-colonel Mathias

== See also ==
- 35th Parachute Artillery Regiment

== Notes and references ==
- Site des troupes de marine
- Musée des troupes de marine de Fréjus
- 11^{e} R.A.M.a

== Sources and bibliography ==
- Erwan Bergot, La coloniale du Rif au Tchad 1925–1980, imprimé en France : décembre 1982, n° d'éditeur 7576, n° d'imprimeur 31129, sur les presses de l'imprimerie Hérissey.
