= Régiment d'infanterie-chars de marine =

Marine Infantry Tank Regiment
- Régiment d'infanterie chars de marine
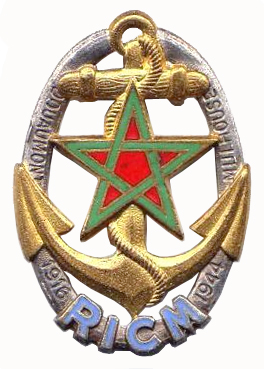
- Regimental Insignia of the RICM
- Active: June 9, 1915–present
- Country: France
- Branch: Marine Troops; French Army
- Type: Regiment
- Role: Light armoured cavalry Amphibious warfare Reconnaissance
- Part of: 9th Marine Infantry Brigade; 1st Division
- Garrison/HQ: Poitiers, France
- Mottos: Recedit Immortalis Certamine Magno (La); Il Revint Immortel de la Grande Bataille(Fr); Returned Immortal from the Grand Battle (Eng)
- Colors: Red and blue
- Anniversaries: Bazeilles; Festival : Douaumont (24 October)
- Engagements: World War I World War II; Indochina War; Algerian War; Lebanese Civil War 1975–1990: United Nations Interim Force in Lebanon; Multinational Force 1982–1984; Gulf War; War on terror (2001–present)
- Battle honours: Marne 1914-1918; Verdun-Douaumont 1916; La Malmaison 1917; Plessis de Roye 1918; L'Aisne-L'Ailette 1918; Champagne 1918; Argonne 1918; Morocco 1925–1926; Toulon 1944; Delle 1944; Kehl 1945; Indochina 1945–1954; AFN 1952–1962

Commanders
- Notable commanders: Henri Bentégeat

The Régiment d'infanterie chars de marine in French, (R.I.C.M, or Marine Infantry Tank Regiment) is a light cavalry regiment of the French Army, successor to the Régiment d'infanterie coloniale du Maroc (R.I.C.M, or Colonial Infantry Regiment of Morocco).

Created in June 1915, then designated accordingly in December 1958, by change of the infantry colonial regiment of Morocco, the regiment is part of the Troupes de Marine and is of a cavalry armoured specialty. The RICM is the most decorated regiment of the French Army. The regiment is attached to the 9th Marine Infantry Brigade (9^{e} BIMa).

== Creation and different nominations ==
- In August 1914: creation of the 1st Mixed Colonial Infantry Regiment (French: 1^{er} Régiment mixte d'infanterie coloniale, R.M.I.C).
- In December 1914 : the regiment was designated as the 1st Marching Colonial Infantry Regiment (French: 1^{er} Régiment de marche d'infanterie coloniale, R.M.I.C).
- On June 9, 1915 : creation of the Colonial Infantry Regiment of Morocco (French: Régiment d'infanterie coloniale du Maroc, R.I.C.M).
- In May 1956 : the regiment was redesignated as the Marine Infantry Tank Regiment (French: Régiment d'infanterie chars de marine, R.I.C.M).

== History ==
=== World War I ===
While the First World War was in its early weeks the regiment was raised in Morocco in the beginning of August 1914 under the designation of 1st Mixed Colonial Infantry Regiment (French: 1^{er} Régiment mixte d'infanterie coloniale, R.M.I.C). In December, the regiment was designated as 1st Marching Colonial Infantry Regiment (French: 1^{er} Régiment de marche d'infanterie coloniale, R.M.I.C). On August 17, 1914, the regiment disembarked and was accordingly engaged on the French front at the early beginning of the conflict. The RICM, Colonial Infantry Regiment of Morocco (French: Régiment d'infanterie coloniale du Maroc, R.I.C.M) was officially created on June 9, 1915. The regiment was composed primarily of Frenchmen of European descent, in accordance with the infantry of the French Marines. However, certain missions included Senegalese and Somali auxiliaries attached to the regiment.

In November 1915, it became part of the 4th Moroccan Brigade. This was attached to the 38th Division, until the Brigade transferred out to the newly-formed 2nd Moroccan Division in August 1918.

Over four years, the regiment engaged on the various fronts as the most highly decorated of the French Army in World War I, its regimental colours adorned with ten citations at the orders of the armed forces.

In October 1916, the regiment was reinforced with Senegalese Tirailleurs and Somalis. The RICM, reinforced by the 43rd Senegalese Tirailleurs battalion and two Somali companies, made their way through the trenches, piercing the lines a depth of two kilometers while undergoing counter-attacks and captured the Fort Douaumont. For this occasion, the regiment was awarded the Légion d'honneur and the third citation at the orders of the armed forces.

Throughout the course of the war, the RICM endured the loss of 15000 Marsouins (killed or wounded) including 250 officers. (Marsouin, 'porpoise', is the nickname for colonial infantrymen.) The regimental colours would bear no less than ten palms on the croix de guerre 14–18, the Légion d'honneur, the Médaille militaire (July 5, 1919) and the Order of the Tower and Sword.

The regiment garrisoned in the Rhineland from 1918 to 1925, after that, it returned to Morocco.

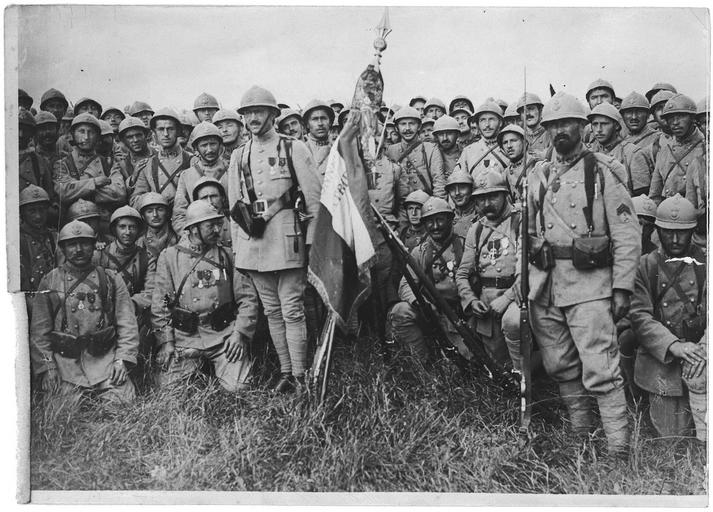
The flag of the Régiment d'infanterie colonial du Maroc, surrounded by marsouins from the unit. Taken on 1 August 1917 at Candor, Oise, France.

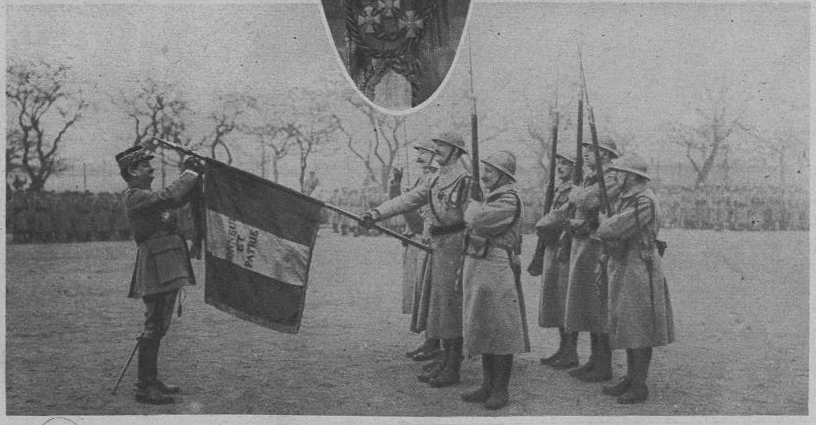
Mangin decorating the regimental colours along with ten citations with the croix de guerre 1914–1918 with palms at Mainz, February 5, 1919.

=== Interwar period ===
The regiment was sent to Morocco, in the Rif first between 1925 and 1926, then from 1927 to 1932. During these years, 94 Marsouins were killed (out of which 8 officers), 275 Marsouis wounded (out of which 7 officers), as well as 10 disappeared.

During this period, the regiment was awarded the Military Sharifian Medal (French: Mérite Militaire Chérifien).

The 3rd battalion and the franc group of the RICM were awarded the Croix de guerre des théâtres d'opérations extérieures at the orders of the armed forces.

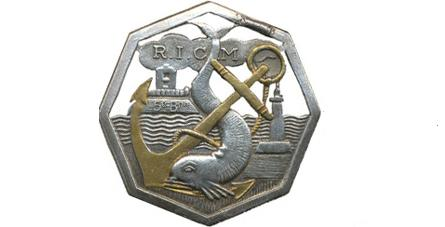
Insignia of the 5th battalion of the Colonial Infantry Regiment of Morocco

=== World War II ===
In Charente on June 23, 1940, the RICM was still combat engaged at La Hayes-Descartes on June 24. Commanded by colonel Avre, the regiment had been engaged in battle for ten days and endured considerable losses when situated at the heights of Civray, south of Esvres. Two small detachments, commanded by lieutenant Setevenson, transmission officer, and captain Alfred Loudes, adjutant to the colonel, manoeuvered to defend the command post and succeeded. During these battles, the regiment endured 600 killed, wounded or disappeared during combat around Amboise.

During the armistice period, in the free zone, the 2^{e} RIC garrisoned in Perpignan and the 21^{e} RIC at Fréjus, Toulon and Marseille. The RICM was reconstituted in North Africa, as well as the 43^{e} RIC.

Fall of 1943, the 9th Colonial Infantry Division 9^{e} DIC was put in place by général Blaizot and the reconnaissance regiment of the Division was designated as the RICM of Rabat, during which at the end of April, the regiment embarked for Corsica. The division was of a solid formation. On June 17, 1944, the division occupied Elba. Two months later, the regiment disembarked in Provence at Nartelle, followed by the fall of Toulon and the regroup at Vierzon.

The RICM was the first to reach the Rhin, aspirant Jean-Louis Delayen raised the fanion of his squadron at Rosenau on November 20, 1944. End of November, the RICM made way to Mulhouse. The 9^{e} DIC took 200 cities or villages, over a stretch of three hundred kilometers while facing five opposing divisions.

With the campaigns of the Liberation, the RICM endured the loss of 54 Marsouins (including 2 Officers), 143 wounded (including 6 officers).

Two citations, at the orders of the armed forces, decorated the regimental colors of the RICM.

A U.S. decoration, the Distinguished Unit was awarded to the regiment during battles in Belfort, Mulhouse and Seppois-le-Bas.

=== Indochina War ===
On November 4, 1945, the first elements of the regiment arrived in Saigon. The regiment took part in all operations, including operation Gaur (1946), operation of control in Cochinchine and Annam (1946 to 1947), Cambodia (1946 to 1947), Tonkin (1946 to 1947), operation Lea (Lang-Son, Cao-Bang, Bac-Kan), high region (February 1948 to February 1951), operations in the delta (January 1948 to February 1951), Dien Bien Phu, and leading the last combats until July 1954.

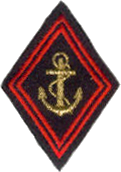
Insignia of left arm of marine infantry, the sous-officiers model (golden anchor)

The Armoured Tonkin Group was decorated with the orders of the various armed forces. One squadron was decorated with the orders of the French Navy, as well as the marching group squadron. A citation at the orders of the Army Corps was awarded to three squadrons (cited twice), the marching battalion of the RICM, the marching squadron group of the RICM as well as a platoon of one of the squadrons. One of the squadrons was awarded also a citation of the orders of the Division.

In total, fifteen citations were awarded to units of the RICM during that war, five out of which were for the regiment.

During this war, the regiment endured the loss of 1300 Marsouins (out of which 57 officers, 167 sous-officiers killed or wounded).

=== Algerian War ===
In May 1956, the Colonial Infantry Regiment of Morocco (French: Régiment d'Infanterie Coloniale du Maroc, R.I.C.M) made its way to Algeria. In 1958, while the Colonial Troops (French: Troupes Coloniales, TC) were rebranded Marine Troops (French: Troupes de Marine, TDM), the initials were conserved in memory of its long history of service to France. The regiment became the Marine Infantry Tank Regiment (French: Régiment d'Infanterie-Chars de Marine, R.I.C.M), the only TDM (troupe de marine) formation to fight with light armour. In 1986, the 1st Marine Infantry Regiment 1^{er} RIMa adopted a similar designation. Cadres of the regiment are formed at the Cavalry Application School of Saumur.

Following the ceasefire on March 19, 1962, 114 units of local forces of the Algerian order of battle were created in the whole of Algeria, composed of 10% French military personnel and 90% Muslim Algerian military personnel, who would remain in the service of the executive provisional power of Algeria until the independence of Algeria. The RICM formed the 513th unit of the local force of the Algerian order of battle during the transitory period to full independence (Accords d'Evian).

=== Return to the mainland ===
The regiment, in its return to metropolitan France, had its barracks moved at Vannes from 1963 to 1996. Since September 1996, the regiment has been based in Poitiers.

=== Foreign operations ===
In 1978 and 1979, the RICM participated to operation Tacaud in Chad. In April 1978, 2 Marsouins were killed as well as several wounded during the battle of Salal, the first combat engagements during the conflict. In October of the same year, the regiment took part in the skirmish of "Forchana" followed by the combat engagement of "Katafa": where four military personnel were seriously wounded. During mid-December, the combat of Foundouck witnessed various personnel seriously wounded. At the beginning of 1979 on March 5, another assault was mounted, during which one Marsouin was killed and several were wounded. The outcome for the regiment was the apprehending of some 800 weapons and vehicles by the French groupment including units of the 3rd Marine Infantry Regiment 3^{e} RIMa and the 11th Marine Artillery Regiment 11^{e} RAMa. Accordingly, various platoons were detached in the capital in order to avoid any inter-ethnic confrontations. During these various combats, heavy losses were inflicted on rebels and a vast number of materials, arms and vehicles was recuperated or destroyed.

In parallel from March 1978 to September 1978, the 1st squadron was part of the first detachment of the United Nations Interim Force in Lebanon UNIFIL at the corps groupment of the 3rd Marine Infantry Parachute Regiment 3^{e} RPIMa. One Marsouin was killed and several wounded during a combat engagement on May 2, 1978. A citation at the orders of the armed forces was awarded in October 1978 to the RICM for peace combat engagements in Lebanon, and Tchad in 1978.

In end of 1979, the RICM took part in operation « Barracuda ».

By a decision decree dated October 25, 1978, actions led by a regiment in a country linked to France by a cooperation accords (agreement) in the various fields and at the corps of the United Nations Interim Force in Lebanon was seen recompensated by attribution of an 18th citation at the orders of the armed forces.

In 1990 and 1991, the regiment intervened in operation Salamandre, then in the active phase of the Gulf War.

In 1992, the regiment contributed the first element of frenchbat (French battalion) of Sarajevo, from the RICM reinforced by a company of the 2nd Marine Infantry Regiment 2^{e} RIMa in Ex-Yugoslavia, where the regiment endured the loss of four men and illustrated capability most notably during the combats of the Vrbanja bridge at Sarajevo on May 27, 1995.

In 1994, the regiment was engaged in operation Turquoise in Rwanda.

In 2004, the RICM led the tactical inter-arm group of operation Licorne in the Ivory Coast. The regiment endured the loss of five Marsouins and some thirty others wounded.

In 2019, it was announced that the RICM would deploy in the first trimester of 2021 to join the ongoing Operation Barkhane in the African Sahel region, where the unit would be tasked with anti-terrorism, support, and civil affairs missions.

== Organization ==
The regiment is organized into 6 squadrons.

- Escadron de commandement et de logistique (ECL) - Command and Logistics Squadron
- 1^{er} Escadron de combat (1^{er} Esc) - 1st Combat Squadron
- 2^{e} Escadron de combat (2^{e} Esc) - 2nd Combat Squadron
- 3^{e} Escadron de combat (3^{e} Esc) - 3rd Combat Squadron
- 4^{e} Escadron de combat (4^{e} Esc) - 4th Combat Squadron
- Escadron de réserve (ER) - Reserve Squadron

== Traditions ==
=== Motto ===
Latin, "Recedit Immortalis Certamine Magno". In French : "Il revint Immortel de la Grande Bataille" which translates to : "Returned Immortal from the Grand Battle".

=== Insignias ===
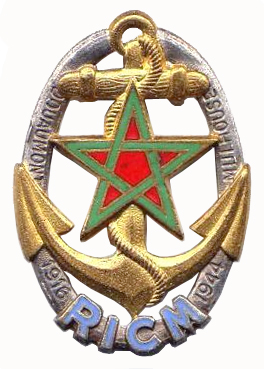
RICM Insignia

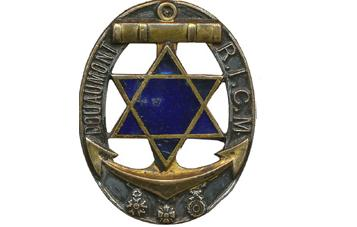
RICM Insignia with Dark Blue Star

=== Decorations ===
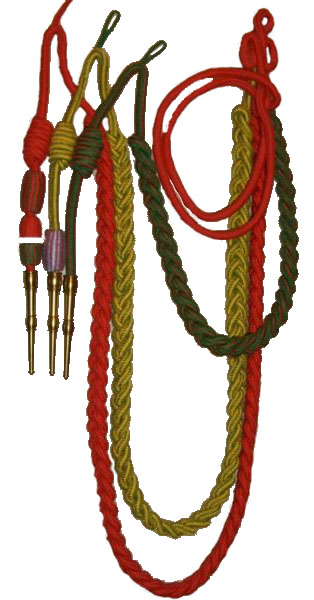
Fourragère worn by the RICM regiment.

The RICM is the most decorated regiment of the French Army. The regimental colors are decorated with:

- croix of the Légion d'honneur
- Médaille militaire
- croix de guerre 1914-1918 with:
  - Ten palms
- croix de guerre 1939-1945 with :
  - Two palms
- Croix de guerre des théâtres d'opérations extérieures with:
  - Five palms
- Cross for Military Valour with :
- One palm, awarded retroactively on August 31, 2012, cited at the orders of the armed forces for service in 1978, Tchad (18th citation)
- One palm, awarded retroactively on May 4, 2013, cited at the orders of the armed forces for service of the RICM in 2004, Ivory Coast (19th citation)
- Ordem Militar da Torre e Espada (Order of the Tower and Sword - Portugal)
- Mérite Militaire Chérifien - Military Sharifian Medal
- Presidential Unit Citation with ROSENAU conferred January 10, 1957 by the United States.

The marsouins of the RICM bear wearing the Fourragere:

- The two Fourragere doubled with colors of the Légion d'honneur and the Croix de guerre (for ten citations at the orders of the armed forces during the World War I), with olive bearing colors of the croix de guerre 1939-1945 (for two citations at the orders of the armed forces during World War II).
- The Fourragere with colors of the Médaille militaire with olive bearing colors of the Croix de guerre des théâtres d'opérations extérieures (for citations at orders of the armed forces in exterior conflicts of theatres).

The regimental colors of the RICM is the most decorated out of all regimental colors of the French Army. The regiment titled 19 citations at the orders of the armed forces in 2012.

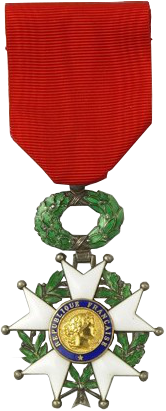
Croix of the Légion d'honneur

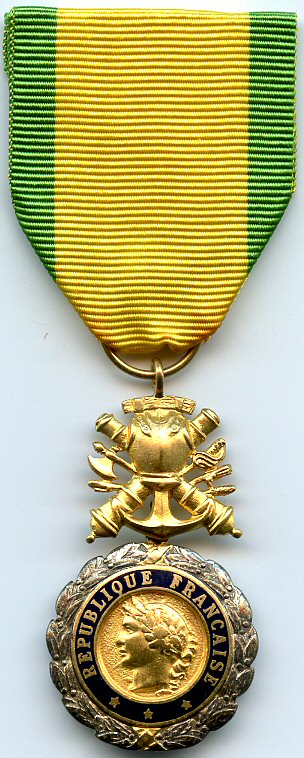
Médaille militaire

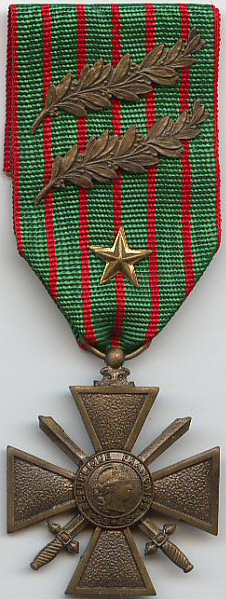
Croix de Guerre 1914-1918 with ten palms

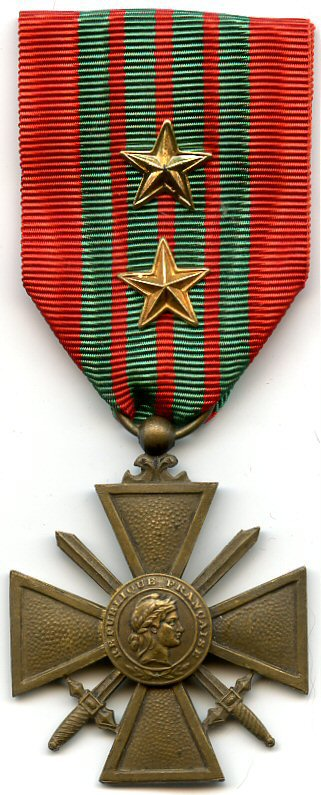
Croix de Guerre 1939-1945 with two palms

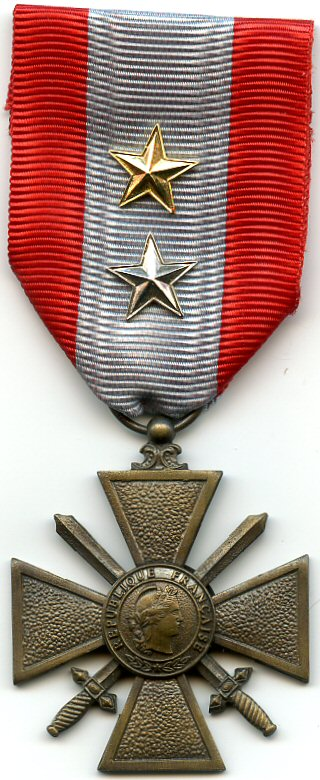
Croix de guerre des Théâtres d'opérations extérieures with five palms

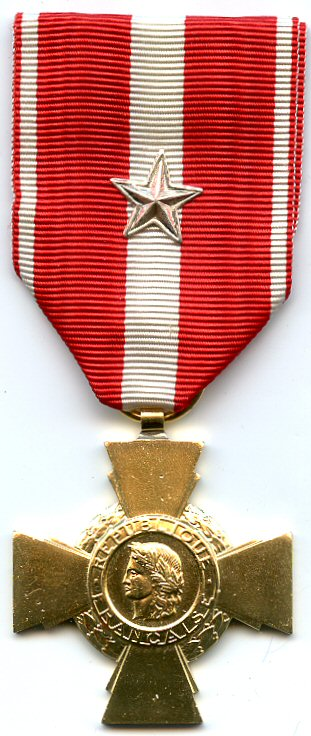
Croix de la Valeur militaire with two palms

Portuguese Order of the Tower and Sword

U.S. Presidential Unit Citation

=== Honours ===
==== Battle honours ====
- La Marne 1914–1918
- Verdun-Douaumont 1916
- La Malmaison 1917
- Plessis de Roye 1918
- L'Aisne-L'Ailette 1918
- Champagne 1918
- Argonne 1918
- Maroc 1925–1926
- Toulon 1944
- Delle 1944
- Kehl 1945
- Indochine 1945–1954
- AFN 1952–1962

== Regimental commanders ==
=== Régiment d'infanterie coloniale du Maroc – R.I.C.M (1914–1958) ===
- 1914 - 1914: Lieutenant-colonel Pernot
- 1914 - 1915: Lieutenant-colonel Larroque
- 1915 - 1917: Lieutenant-colonel Régnier
- 1917 - 1918: Lieutenant-colonel Debailleul
- 1918 - 1918: Lieutenant-colonel Modat
- 1919 - 1922: Lieutenant-colonel OZIL
- 1919 - 1922: Colonel Mouveaux
- 1922 - 1924: Colonel Duplat
- 1924 - 1927: Colonel Barbassat
- 1927 - 1930: Lieutenant-colonel de Scheidhauer
- 1930 - 1932: Colonel de Bazelaire de Ruppierre
- 1932 - 1933: Colonel Petitjean
- 1933 - 1935: Colonel Deslaurens
- 1935 - 1938: Colonel Allut
- 1938 - 1940: Colonel Turquin
- 1940 - 1940: Colonel Avre
- 1940 - 1940: Colonel Panis
- 1940 - 1941: Colonel Lupy
- 1941 - 1942: Lieutenant-colonel Kieffer
- 1942 - 1942: Lieutenant-colonel Magnan
- 1942 - 1942: Lieutenant-colonel Hebpeard
- 1942 - 1943: Colonel Thiabaud
- 1943 - 1945: Colonel Le Puloch
- 1945 - 1946: Colonel de Brebisson
- 1946 - 1947: Chef de bataillon de La Brosse
- 1947 - 1947: Chef de bataillon Deysson
- 1947 - 1949: Lieutenant-colonel Mareuge
- 1949 - 1950: Lieutenant-colonel Capber
- 1950 - 1952: Lieutenant-colonel de La Brosse
- 1952 - 1952: Chef de bataillon Lacour
- 1952 - 1954: Lieutenant-colonel Maurel
- 1954 - 1956: Lieutenant-colonel Thiers
- 1956 - 1956: Lieutenant-colonel Cochet
- 1956 - 1957: Colonel Thiers
- 1957 - 1958: Colonel Cochet

=== Régiment d'infanterie chars de marine - R.I.C.M (1958 - present) ===
- 1958 - 1959: Colonel Deysson*
- 1959 - 1959: Lieutenant-colonel Kerourio
- 1959 - 1961: Lieutenant-colonel de Gouvion-Saint-Cyr
- 1961 - 1963: Lieutenant-colonel Dercourt
- 1963 - 1964: Colonel Routier
- 1964 - 1966: Colonel Pascal
- 1966 - 1968: Colonel Duval
- 1968 - 1970: Colonel Pierre
- 1970 - 1972: Colonel Hiliquin
- 1972 - 1974: Colonel Garen
- 1974 - 1976: Lieutenant-colonel Fouilland
- 1976 - 1978: Colonel Gibour
- 1978 - 1980: Lieutenant-colonel Leroy
- 1980 - 1982: Lieutenant-colonel Collignon
- 1982 - 1984: Colonel Lagane
- 1984 - 1986: Lieutenant-colonel Boutin
- 1986 - 1988: Colonel Jean-Michel de Widerspach-Thor*
- 1988 - 1990: Colonel Henri Bentégeat**
- 1990 - 1992: Colonel Xavier de Zuchowicz*
- 1992 - 1994: Colonel Patrice Sartre
- 1994 - 1996: Colonel Sandahl
- 1996 - 1998: Colonel Pierre-Richard Kohn
- 1998 - 2000: Colonel Arnaud Rives
- 2000 - 2002: Colonel Dominique Artur
- 2002 - 2004: Colonel Éric Bonnemaison
- 2004 - 2006: Colonel Patrick Destremau
- 2006 - 2008: Colonel Frédéric Garnier
- 2008 - 2010: Colonel François Labuze
- 2010 - 2012: Colonel Marc Conruyt
- 2012 - 2014: Colonel Loïc Mizon
- 2014 - 20xx: Colonel Etienne du Peyroux

(*) Officer who later became général de corps d'armée.
(**) Officer who later became général d'armée.

Henri Bentégeat was Chef d'état-major des armées from 2002 to 2006.

== Notable officers and marines ==
- Joost van Vollenhoven (1877–1918), as a sergent, promoted sous-lieutenant at the beginning of the war, then as a captain at end of the war. Governor of French West Africa. Since 1963, the honorary hall of the regiment has been named Joost van Vollenhoven.
- Général Jean-Louis Delayen (1921–2002), regimental commander of the 2nd Marine Infantry Regiment

== See also ==
- Moroccan Division
- Marching Regiment of the Foreign Legion
