= 3rd Armored Division (France) =

French Army formation

- 3^{e} Division Blindée
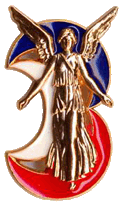
- Insignia of the 3^{e} DIV.
- Active: April 15, 1943 - April 15, 1946; 1951 - July 1991; June 20, 2016 - present
- Country: France
- Branch: French Army
- Size: ~ 29,000 total personnel: 25,000 active; 4,000 reserves
- Garrison/HQ: Marseille
- Mottos: « Un seul but, la Victoire », meaning One goal, Victory.
- Engagements: World War II

Commanders
- Current commander: General Hubert Cotterau

The 3rd Armoured Division (French: 3^{e} Division Blindée, 3^{e} DB) is a unit of the French Army. The Division is the heir of the 3rd Algerian Infantry Division (3^{e} DIA) formed in 1943 and dissolved in 1946, which contributed in the liberation of Marseille during the Second World War.

The 3rd Armoured Division was created in 1951 then dissolved in 1991. The 3rd Mechanised Brigade (3^{e} BM), created in 1999, inherited the traditions of the division.

The 3rd Division (3^{e} DIV) was recreated on June 20, 2016, as part of a reorganisation of the French Army.

== Creation and different nominations ==
- The 3rd Algerian Infantry Division (3^{e} DIA) was created on April 15, 1943;
- Dissolution on April 15, 1946;
- The 3rd Armored Division (3^{e} DB), heir of the 3rd Algerian Infantry Division, was created in 1951;
- The 3rd Armored Division was dissolved in July 1991;
- The 3rd Mechanised Brigade (3^{e} BM), created in July 1999 inherited traditions of the division. The brigade became designated as 3rd Light Armored Brigade (3^{e} BLB) in 2014;

== Heraldry ==
It was under the signs of Latin traditions that général de Monsabert wanted to place the 3rd Algerian Infantry Division 3^{e} DIA during creation on May 1, 1943.

The insignia of "Victory" (French: La Victoire) of Cirta (province of Numidia, today Constantine (provence in Algeria)) is supported by three crescents representing the Muslims, which composed the majority of the division, Allied to the metropolitans (blue white red).Origin of the insignia, La Victoire de Cirta

The "Victory" (French: La Victoire) was a Roman goddess protector of the Emperors that the Legio III Augusta de Cirta particularly venerated. The winged statuette was found during a search of an old garrison in Constantine in the 19th century.

The motto of the 3rd Light Armoured Brigade was : « Plus d'honneur que d'honneurs » in French which translates literally to « More honor than the honors ». The motto of the 3rd Division currently is : « Un seul but : La victoire », which translates to «One goal, Victory».

== History ==
=== 1943 to 1946 ===
The 3rd Algerian Infantry Division (3^{e} DIA), formed on April 15, 1943, fought in the Italy and France during World War II under general Joseph de Goislard de Monsabert and Augustin Guillaume. The division was dissolved on April 15, 1946.

=== 1951 to 1991 ===
The 3rd Division was reconstituted in 1951 as part of 2nd Army Corps, First Army, stationed with the French Forces in Germany. This was a grand unit of almost 15000 men covering the Western part of Germany and comprising three brigades:

- The 5th Mechanised Brigade at Tübingen;
- The 12th Mechanised Brigade at Offenbourg;
- The 13th Motorized Brigade at Konstanz

the division became the 3rd Armoured Division in 1978. It was made up of three infantry regiments, two tank regiments, two artillery regiments, one engineer regiment, and one command and support regiment. As the Cold War came to an end, the division was dissolved in 1991.

==== Organigram in 1991 ====
Two tank regiments, three infantry regiments, two artillery regiments, one engineer regiment, one command and support regiment:

Based in Fribourg-en-Brisgau.

- 3rd Dragoon Regiment (French: 3^{e} Régiment de dragons, 3^{e} RD)
- 12th Cuirassier Regiment (12^{e} RC)
- 19^{e} Groupe de chasseurs portés, 19^{e}GCP)
- 42nd Infantry Regiment, 42^{e} RI
- 152nd Infantry Regiment, 152^{e} RI

Support:

- 11th Artillery Regiment (French: 11^{e} Régiment d'artillerie, 11^{e} RA)
- 34th Artillery Regiment (French: 34^{e} Régiment d'artillerie, 34^{e} RA)
- 11th Engineer Regiment (French: 11^{e} Régiment du génie, 11^{e} RG)

Other support :

- 3rd Command and Support Regiment (French: 3^{e} Régiment de commandement et de soutien, 3^{e} RCS)

=== 1999 to 2015 ===
The 3rd Mechanised Brigade (3^{e} BM) created in 1999 carried on the traditions of the division. The headquarter staff was based in Limoges. In 2011, the headquarter staff of the 3^{e} BM garrisoned at Clermont-Ferrand.

On March 18, 2014, the 3rd Mechanised Brigade became designated as the 3rd Light Armoured Brigade (3^{e} BLB). The brigade was disbanded on 16 June 2016.

=== Since 2016 ===
The 3rd Division (3^{e} DIV) was recreated during a ceremony on June 20, 2016. The division is formed of three brigades, part of the Scorpion Force, alongside the 1st Division. The headquarters staff is located in Marseille.

== Composition ==
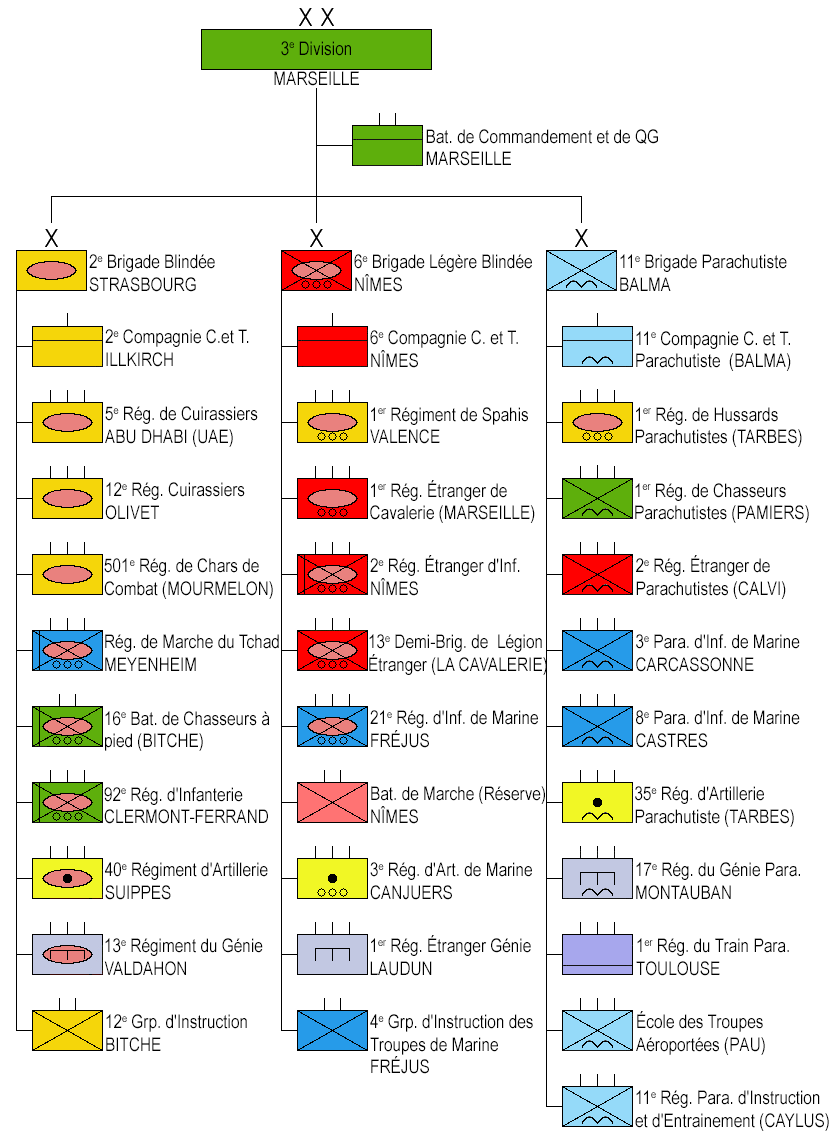
3^{e} Division organization 2025

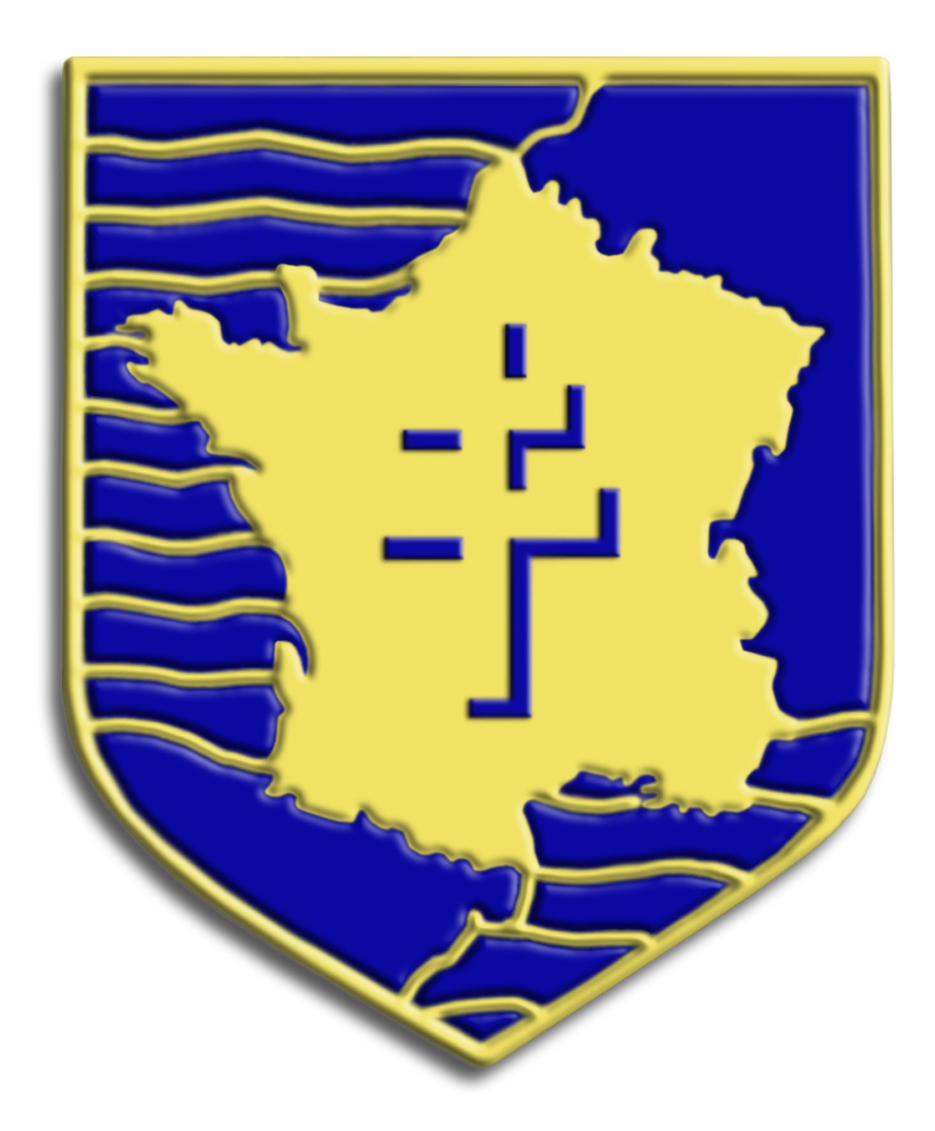
Badge of the 2nd Armored Brigade

The 3rd Division is based in Marseille and is subordinated to the Commandement de la Force et des Opérations Terrestres (CFOT). Effectifs form 25000 men and 4000 reservists in:

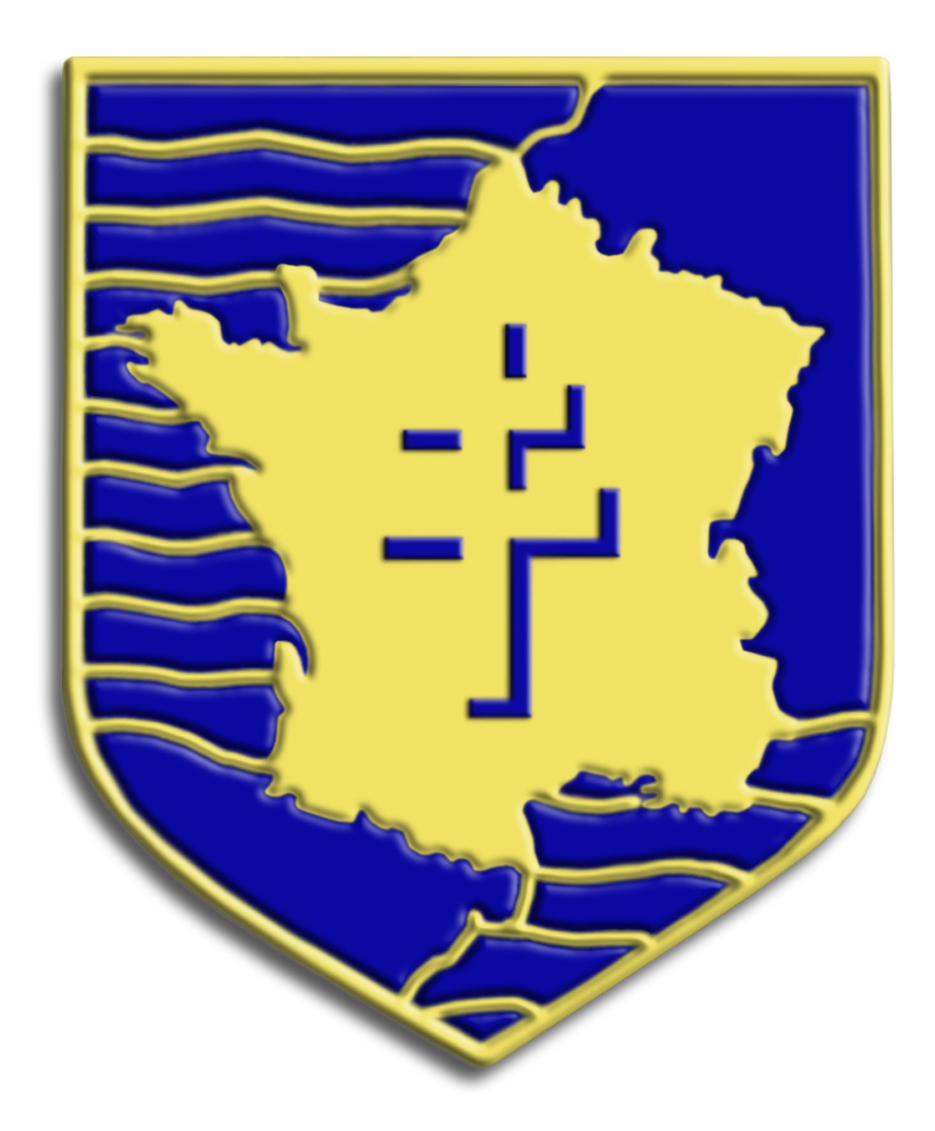
Badge of the 2nd Armored Brigade

- 2^{e} Brigade Blindée (2^{e} BB) – 2nd Armored Brigade, in Strasbourg
  - 2^{e} Compagnie de Commandement et de Transmissions Blindée (2^{e} CCTB) - 2nd Armored Command and Signals Company (VAB), in Illkirch-Graffenstaden
  - 12^{e} Régiment de Cuirassiers (12^{e} RC) - 12th Cuirassier Regiment (Leclerc MBTs, VBL vehicles), in Olivet
  - 501^{e} Régiment de Chars de Combat (501^{e} RCC) - 501st Tank Regiment (Leclerc MBTs, VAB, VBL vehicles), in Mourmelon-le-Grand
  - Régiment de Marche du Tchad (RMT) - "Ad hoc Regiment of Chad" (VBCI IFVs), in Meyenheim
  - 5^{e} Régiment de Cuirassiers (5^{e} RC) - 5th Cuirassier Regiment, in Abu Dhabi (United Arab Emirates)
  - 16^{e} Bataillon de Chasseurs à pied (16^{e} BCP) - 16th Chasseurs on Foot Battalion (VBCI IFVs), in Bitche
  - 92^{e} Régiment d'Infanterie (92^{e} RI) - 92nd Infantry Regiment (VBCI IFVs), in Clermont-Ferrand
  - 40^{e} Régiment d'Artillerie (40^{e} RA) - 40th Artillery Regiment (CAESAR howitzers, RTF1 mortars, Mistral missiles), in Suippes
  - 13^{e} Régiment du Génie (13^{e} RG) - 13th Engineer Regiment (VAB Génie), in Valdahon
  - 12^{e} Groupement d'Instruction (12^{e} GI) - 12th Instruction Group, in Bitche
- 6^{e} Brigade Légère Blindée (6^{e} BLB) – 6th Light Armored Brigade, in Nîmes
  - 6^{e} Compagnie de Commandement et de Transmissions de Marine (6^{e} CCTMa) - 6th Marine Command and Signals Company (VAB), in Nîmes
  - 1^{er} Régiment de Spahis (1^{er} RS) – 1st Spahi Regiment (AMX-10 RC, VAB, VBL vehicles, being replaced by EBRC Jaguar vehicles), in Valence
  - 1^{er} Régiment Étranger de Cavalerie (1^{er} REC) - 1st Foreign Cavalry Regiment (EBRC Jaguar vehicles), in Marseille
  - 2^{e} Régiment Étranger d'Infanterie (2^{e} REI) - 2nd Foreign Infantry Regiment (VBCI IFVs), in Nîmes
  - 13^{e} Demi Brigade de Légion Etrangère (13^{e} DBLE) - 13th Demi-Brigade of the Foreign Legion (VBMR Griffon), in La Cavalerie
  - 21^{e} Régiment d'Infanterie de Marine (21^{e} RIMa) - 21st Marine Infantry Regiment (VBMR Griffon), in Fréjus
  - Bataillon de Marche - Marching Battalion (Reserve), in Nîmes
  - 3^{e} Régiment d'Artillerie de Marine (3^{e} RAMa) - 3rd Marine Artillery Regiment (CAESAR howitzers, RTF1 mortars, Mistral missiles), in Canjuers
  - 1^{er} Régiment Étranger de Génie (1^{er} REG) - 1st Foreign Engineer Regiment, in Laudun
  - 4^{e} Groupement d'Instruction des Troupes de Marine (4^{e} GITdM) - 4th Marine Instruction Group, in Fréjus

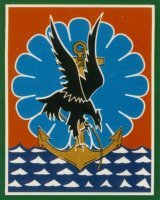
Badge of the 11th Parachute Brigade

- 11^{e} Brigade Parachutiste (11^{e} BP) – 11th Parachute Brigade, in Balma
  - 11^{e} Compagnie de Commandement et de Transmissions Parachutiste (11^{e} CCTP) - 11th Parachute Command and Signals Company, in Balma
  - 1^{er} Régiment de Hussards Parachutistes (1^{er} RHP) - 1st Parachute Hussar Regiment (AMX-10 RC, ERC 90, VAB, VBL vehicles, being replaced by EBRC Jaguar vehicles), in Tarbes
  - 1^{er} Régiment de Chasseurs Parachutistes (1^{er} RCP) - 1st Parachute Chasseur Regiment (VAB), in Pamiers
  - 2^{e} Régiment Étranger de Parachutistes (2^{e} REP) - 2nd Foreign Parachute Regiment (VAB), in Calvi
  - 3^{e} Régiment de Parachutistes d'Infanterie de Marine (3^{e} RPIMa) - 3rd Marine Infantry Parachute Regiment (VBMR-L Serval vehicles), in Carcassonne
  - 8^{e} Régiment de Parachutistes d'Infanterie de Marine (8^{e} RPIMa) - 8th Marine Infantry Parachute Regiment (VAB), in Castres
  - 35^{e} Régiment d'Artillerie Parachutiste (35^{e} RAP) - 35th Parachute Artillery Regiment (CAESAR howitzers, RTF1 mortars, Mistral missiles), in Tarbes
  - 17^{e} Régiment du Génie Parachutiste (17^{e} RGP) - 17th Parachute Engineer Regiment, in Montauban
  - 1^{er} Régiment du Train Parachutiste (1^{er} RTP) - 1st Parachute Supply Regiment, in Toulouse
  - École des Troupes Aéroportées (ETAP) - Airborne Troops School, in Pau
  - 11^{e} Régiment Parachutiste d'Instruction et d'Entraînement (11^{e} RPIE) - 11th Parachute Instruction and Training Regiment, in Caylus
