= 6th Engineer Regiment (France) =

- 6^{e} Régiment du Génie
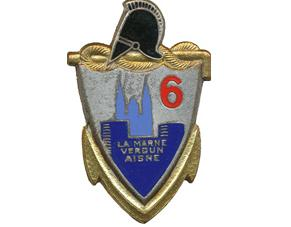
- Regimental insignia
- Active: 1894 - present
- Country: France
- Branch: French Army
- Type: Engineer
- Part of: 9th Marine Infantry Brigade; 1st Division
- Motto: « Je continuerai » (Fr).
- Battle honours: Madagascar 1895; La Marne 1914; Verdun 1916; L'Aisne 1917; Champagne 1918

The 6th Engineers Regiment (French: 6^{e} Régiment du Génie) is a regiment of the génie militaire of the French Military constituted under the IIIrd Republic. It is the only Engineers Regiment among the Troupes de Marine (French Marine Corps).

== Creation and different nominations ==
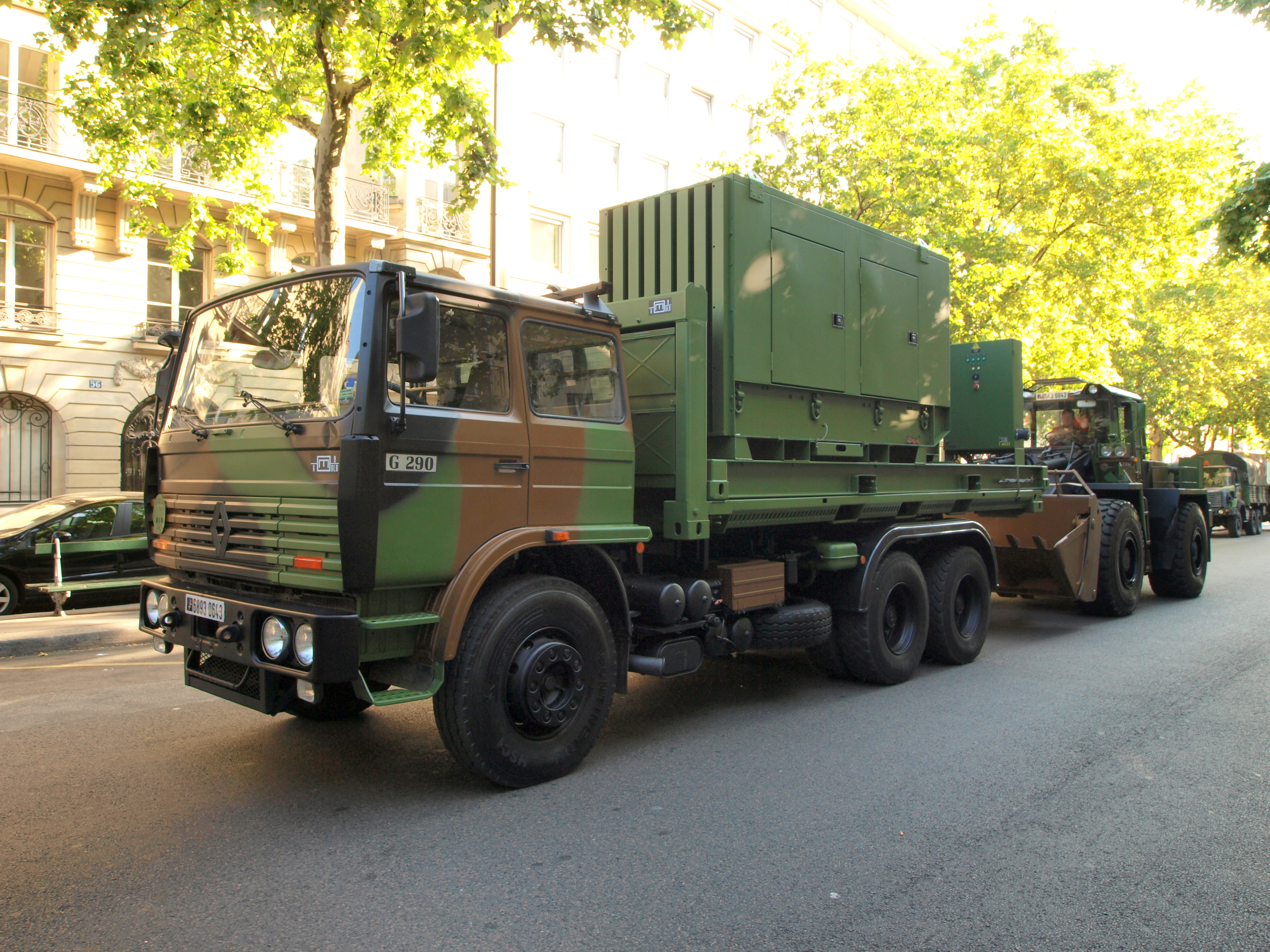
Truck Renault and bulldozer of the 6th Engineer Regiment in 2010.

In 1894 : 6th Engineer Regiment 6^{e} RG was created, on October 1 at Angers. The regiment was installed in garrison Eblé designated after the général whose men perished while constructing the bridges on the Bérézina.

== History ==
=== 1894 to 1914 ===
- 1894 : Angers
- 1895 : Campaigns in Madagascar
- 1900 : China

=== World War I ===
- 1914 : La Marne
- 1916 : Verdun
- 1917 : L'Aisne
- 1918 : Champagne

During the campaign of 1914–1918, 17 companies of the regiment were cited 72 times (out of which 47 citations at the orders of the armed forces). 15 companies of the regiment were awarded the right to wear the fourragere of the Croix de guerre 1914-1918.

=== Interwar period ===
- 1918-1939 : Angers
- 1925-1927: Rif War

=== World War II ===
In June 1940, the 6th Engineer Regiment participated to the combats of the Cadets of Saumur. Missioned by lieutenant-colonel Robert, regimental commander of the depot of the 6th Engineer Regiment, lieutenant Rousseau was the chief head center at Saumur and had at his disposition, for each bridge, one officer with some 30 men : lieutenant Martin on the bridge of Montsoreau, lieutenant Poupon on the bridge of VR de Saumur, sous-lieutenant Fraisier on the bridge of VF de Saumur, sous-lieutenant Falck on the bridge of Gennes.

In total, there were 120 men at the war depot of the 6th Engineer Regiment which supported the combats of the Cadets of Saumur.

Captain Schneider was cited for the defensive mounted on the bridge of Port-Boulet.

At mobilization in September 1939, the 71st Engineer Battalion was created at Angers. The active encadrement of this unique regiment of engineer of the 1st Colonial Infantry Division 1^{re} DIC was issued from the 6th Engineer Regiment.

From that came the links between the 71st and 6th, out of which in 1997, was summarized by the transfer to the 6^{e} RG of a complete consecutive company at the dissolution of the 71st.

=== 1945 to present ===
Following World War II, the 6th was garrisoned in Angers at garrison Vernau, in designation of Jean-Edouard Verneau, a resistant French général, deceased in deportation in 1944.

- 1946 - : garrison at Angers.
- 1945 - 1954 : participated to the French Far East Expeditionary Corps.
- 1977 - 1984 : 4th Cavalry Division (French: 4^{e} Division de Cavalerie, 4^{e} DC).
- 1984 - 1993 : 3rd Army Corps.
- 1993 - : 9th Marine Infantry Division 9^{e} DIMa, then 9th Light Armoured Marine Brigade 9^{e} BLBMa, then designated 9th Marine Infantry Brigade 9^{e} BIMa.
  - Interventions in Lebanon, Guyana, Central African Republic, Tchad, Pakistan, Kuwait, Somalia, Rwanda, Cambodia, Congo, Albania, Kosovo and Bosnia and Herzegovina.
  - Since 2004, 500 sapeurs of the 6th Engineer Regiment deployed to the Ivory Coast, Guyana, Afghanistan, Senegal, Martinique, Mayotte and Haiti.
  - In February 2006, a hundred sapeurs were deployed to aid the populations of the Reunion in an epidemic.
  - In 2010 : the "6" integrated two companies in the 2nd Engineer Regiment 2^{e} RG and one reserve company 22nd Marine Infantry Battalion 22^{e} BIMa.
  - In 2013 : the "6" was engaged in Mali during Operation Serval.

== Traditions ==
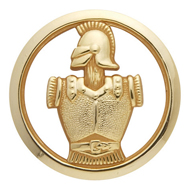
Génie

=== Motto ===
To recall the commitment, fidelity and hardship work of the sapeurs of the "6", the writer Hervé Bazin, nominated the motto of the regiment "Je continuerai". In the years of 1980, the motto was "Parfois détruire, souvent construire, toujours servir".

=== Nickname ===
The Marine soldiers are called "marsouins" when coming from the infantry or light cavalry and "bigors" when coming from the artillery. The engineers being more recently added in the French Marines, they do not have a traditional nickname. They are called "sapeurs de Marine" (Marine engineers).

=== Decorations ===
The regimental colors of the 6th Engineer Regiment 6^{e} RG is decorated with:

- 15 companies of the 6th Engineer Regiment, were cited numerous times for collective and individual acts of valor during the 1914-1918 world conflict and two citations at the orders of the armed forces.
- Croix de guerre 1914-1918 with:
  - 2 palms
- Croix de la Valeur militaire with:
  - 1 palm (May 4, 2013)

Fourragere:

- Fourragère with colors of the croix de guerre 1914-1918
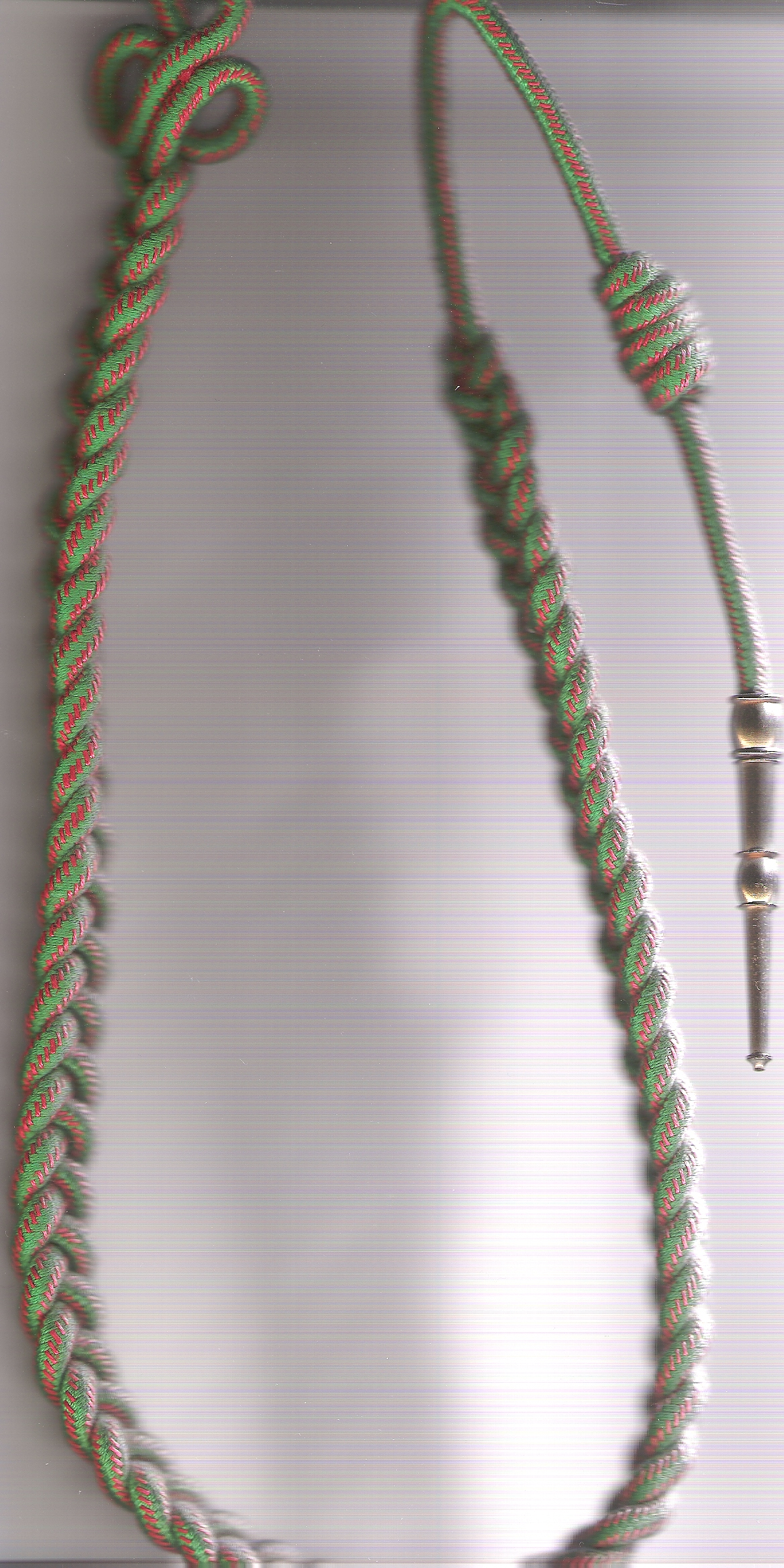
Fourragère aux couleurs du ruban de la Croix de guerre 1914-1918

=== Honours ===
==== Battle Honours ====
- Madagascar 1895
- La Marne 1914
- Verdun 1916
- L'Aisne 1917
- Champagne 1918

== Regimental Commander ==
- 1894 - 1897 : Colonel Dalstein
- 1897 - 1899 : Colonel Gillet
- 1899 - 1902 : Colonel Mortagne
- 1902 - 1904 : Colonel Mague
- 1904 - 1905 : Colonel Petitbon
- 1905 - 1908 : Colonel Bourdeaux
- 1908 - 1911 : Colonel Alby
- 1911 - 1912 : Colonel de Montdesir
- 1914 - 1919 : Colonel Bernard
- 1919 - 1920 : Lieutenant-colonel Leroux
- 1920 - 1922 : Colonel Thomas
- 1922 - 1924 : Colonel Leroux
- 1924 - 1926 : Colonel Letourneur
- 1926 - 1928 : Colonel Tircaud
- 1928 - 1930 : Colonel Gourandy
- 1930 - 1932 : Colonel Alleau
- 1932 - 1934 : Colonel Fillon
- 1934 - 1936 : Colonel Froment
- 1936 - 1938 : Colonel Tournoux
- 1938 - 1939 : Colonel Carrier
- 1939 - 1940 : Lieutenant-colonel Robert
- 1940 - 1941 : Lieutenant-colonel Bastide
- 1941 - 1942 : Lieutenant-colonel Malhomme
- 1945 - 1946 : Lieutenant-colonel Guy
- 1946 - 1950 : Colonel Malhomme
- 1950 - 1952 : Colonel Besson
- 1952 - 1953 : Colonel Muttin
- 1953 - 1956 : Colonel Colin
- 1956 - 1957 : Colonel Bonnamy
- 1957 - 1959 : Colonel Cathala
- 1959 - 1961 : Colonel Guilleret
- 1961 - 1963 : Colonel Tricot
- 1963 - 1964 : Colonel Siquier
- 1964 - 1965 : Colonel Leconte
- 1965 - 1967 : Colonel de Bouteiller
- 1967 - 1969 : Colonel Ledermann
- 1969 - 1971 : Colonel Lartigue
- 1971 - 1973 : Colonel Georges
- 1973 - 1975 : Colonel Tretjak
- 1975 - 1977 : Colonel Munier
- 1977 - 1979 : Colonel Teil
- 1979 - 1981 : Colonel Bresson
- 1981 - 1983 : Colonel Kervizic
- 1983 - 1985 : Colonel Lalier
- 1985 - 1987 : Colonel Laguerie
- 1987 - 1990 : Colonel Leduc
- 1990 - 1992 : Colonel Charvoz
- 1992 - 1994 : Colonel Maral
- 1994 - 1997 : Colonel Chinouilh
- 1997 - 1999 : Colonel Gros
- 1999 - 2001 : Colonel Daehn
- 2001 - 2003 : Colonel de Goutte
- 2003 - 2005 : Colonel Alabergère
- 2005 - 2007 : Colonel de Jerphanion
- 2007 - 2009 : Colonel Quevilly
- 2009 - 2011 : Colonel Glinec
- 2011 - 2013 : Colonel Crach
- 2013 - 2015 : Colonel Combi
- 2015 - : Colonel Guillot
