= 9th Marine Infantry Brigade =

- 9^{e} Brigade d'Infanterie de Marine
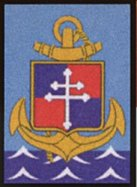
- Badge
- Active: 1 July 1870 - present
- Country: France
- Branch: French Army; Troupes de Marine
- Type: Marine infantry brigade
- Role: Amphibious warfare
- Size: ~ 8,000
- Part of: 1st Division
- Garrison/HQ: Poitiers
- Mottos: Semper et Ubique (La); Toujours et Partout (Fr); Always and All over (Eng)
- Engagements: World War II; Operation Dragoon; Indochina War; Lebanese Civil War; Multinational Force in Lebanon; Gulf War; Bosnian War; War on terror

The 9^{th} Marine Infantry Brigade (French: 9^{e} Brigade d'Infanterie de Marine, 9^{e} BIMa) is a light armoured, amphibious unit of the Troupes de marine of the French Army.

In July 1963, the 9^{e} Brigade was created in Brittany. On 1 January 1976, the 9th Brigade became the 9th Marine Infantry Division (9^{e} division d'Infanterie de Marine, 9^{e} DIMa), attached to the land intervention force, then the Rapid Action Force from 1984. On 1 July 1999, the 9th Marine Infantry Division became the 9th Marine Light Armoured Brigade. On 1 January 2013, the unit was renamed to the 9th Marine Infantry Brigade (French: 9^{e} Brigade d'Infanterie de Marine, 9^{e} BIMa).

== Creation and different nominations ==
- 1943 - 1947 : creation of the 9th Colonial Infantry Division (French: 9e Division d'Infanterie Coloniale, 9^{e} D.I.C)
- 1963 - 1976 : designated as 9th Brigade (French: 9^{e} Brigade, 9^{e}B)
- 1976 - 1999 : designated as 9th Marine Infantry Division (French: 9^{e} Division d'Infanterie de Marine, 9^{e} D.I.Ma)
- 1999 - 2013 : designated as 9th Light Armoured Marine Brigade (French: 9^{e} Brigade Légère Blindée de Marine, 9^{e} B.L.B.Ma)
- 2013–present : designated as 9th Marine Infantry Brigade (French: 9^{e} Brigade d'Infanterie de Marine, 9^{e} B.I.Ma)

== History ==
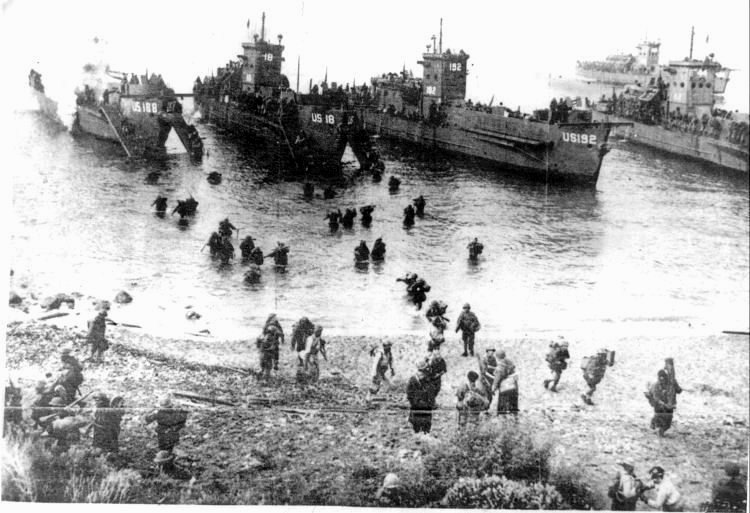
Landing French 9th Colonial Infantry Division troops during the invasion of Elba. 16 June 1944.

The division is heir to the Blue Division which fought during the Franco-Prussian War of 1870, in particular during the Battle of Bazeilles and the 9th Colonial Infantry Division, part of the Free French Forces, which distinguished themselves in the apprehending of Elba in June 1944 and the disembarking in Provence on 15 August of the same year. The Division then made way to Indochina, where it was placed dormant (without being dissolved) in December 1947.

The unit was reactivated in July 1963 in Brittany under the designation of 9th Brigade. On 1 January 1976, the division was baptized as 9th Marine Infantry Division 9^{e} DIMa. Accordingly, the division was attached to the terrestrial intervention force, then the Rapid Action Force (FAR) since 1983. On 1 July 1999, the unit was restructured in a brigade and was designated as 9th Light Armoured Marine Brigade (BLBMa). On 1 January 2013, the brigade was named to the current designation as the 9th Marine Infantry Brigade (9^{e} BIMa).

The headquarter staff is stationed in Poitiers since 1 July 2010. The motto of the brigade is "Semper et Ulbique", Latin for "Always and All over".

The "9th" illustrated capability on all exterior theatres of operations where France has been engaged since World War II: Indochina, Lebanon, Kuwait, Macedonia, Kosovo, Bosnia, Congo, Tchad, Ivory Coast. From October 2010 to May 2011, the Brigade armed essentially Brigade La Fayette in Afghanistan by projecting a headquarter staff ( composed 50% of Marines, Bigors, Marine sapeurs of the 9^{e} BIMa) and the tactical interam groupment of Richelieu armed by the 2nd Marine Infantry Regiment 2^{e} RIMa. In January 2013, elements of the Brigade took part in Operation Serval.

In all combat engagement theatres around the globe, the 9^{e} BIMa illustrated worth of the oldest traditions of the French Troop de Marine.

== Missions ==
The principal mission of the 9^{e} BIMa, for which the brigade is apt to revolve around:

- Amphibious actions: quick projection of a headquarter staff and one reinforced battalion (1,400 men) by naval amphibious marine means, such as Mistral-class amphibious assault ship.
- Security missions, securitization of urbain oriented combat designated areas.
- Deep decentralization action of search and reconnaissance oriented missions.
- Rapid and deep incursions (armored raids, 100 km range)

The 9^{e} BIMa is present around the globe and also relieves missions of short duration such as in Senegal, Guyana in Mayotte and Djibouti. The 9^{e}BIMa actively participates to missions with the French Navy as the land terrestrial land component of Amphibious groups.

The 9^{e} BIMa is twinned with 3rd Royal Marines Commando Brigade of the Royal Navy. Within this title, from 28 May to 1 June 2012, the center of amphibious operations of the headquarter staff embarked on BPC Mistral with the designated exercise Narval. 10 officers of the headquarter staff of the (twin brigade) participated in light of preparation to exercise Corsican Lion which took place from 17 to 26 October 2012.

== Organization ==
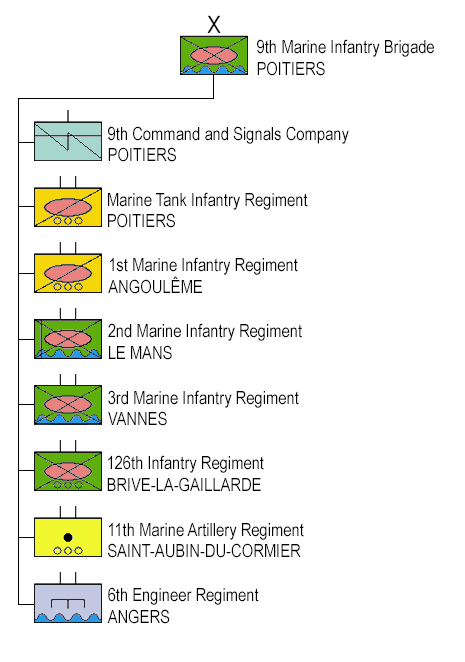
9th Marine Infantry Brigade

- 9^{e} Compagnie de Commandement et de Transmissions (9^{e} CCT) - Command and Signals Company in Poitiers with VAB
- Régiment d'Infanterie-Chars de Marine (RICM) - Armoured Marine Infantry Regiment (light cavalry) in Poitiers with AMX 10 RC and ERC 90
- 1^{er} Régiment d'Infanterie de Marine (1^{er} RIMa) - Armoured Marine Infantry Regiment (light cavalry) in Angoulême with AMX 10 RC and ERC 90
- 2^{e} Régiment d'Infanterie de Marine (2^{e} RIMa) - Marine Infantry Regiment in Le Mans with VBCI
- 3^{e} Régiment d'Infanterie de Marine (3^{e} RIMa) - Marine Infantry Regiment in Vannes with VAB
- 126^{e} Régiment d'Infanterie (126^{e} RI) - Infantry Regiment in Brive-la-Gaillarde with VAB (will be the first unit to receive the new VBMR Griffon in 2018)
- 11^{e} Régiment d'Artillerie de Marine (11^{e} RAMa) - Marine Artillery Regiment in Saint-Aubin-du-Cormier with TRF1 howitzers, CAESAR self-propelled howitzers and RTF1 mortars
- 6^{e} Régiment du Génie (6^{e} RG) - Engineer Regiment in Angers

== Fanfare band ==
The brigade maintains a voluntary military band placed under the authority of the commanding general of the 9eBIMa. It was formed in the 1950s and then became the brigade band in July 2003. It was originally based in Dinan and then in Nantes. It is the only voluntary army formation with a bagad. It is officially referred to as the Fanfare et bagad. The band has been led since 1 September 2011 by Warrant Officer Fabrice Zeni. It operates ensembles such as a ceremonial band and a big band.

== Brigade Commanders ==
- 2003 - 2005 : Général Jean-Paul Thonier
- 2005 - 2007 : Général Hervé Charpentier
- 2007 - 2009 : Général Éric Bonnemaison
- 2009 - 2011 : Général Jean-François Hogard
- 2011 - 2013 : Général François Lecointre
- 2013 - 2015 : Général Vincent Guionie
- 2015 - 201x :: Général François Labuze

== See also ==
- French Navy
