= La Nueve =

9th Company of the Régiment de marche du Tchad
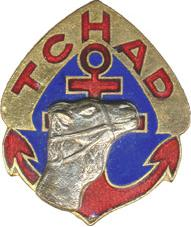
- Regimental insignia
- Active: 13 May 1943 – 9 May 1945
- Country: France
- Allegiance: Free French Forces
- Role: Mechanized Infantry
- Size: ~160
- Part of: Régiment de marche du Tchad, 2nd Armoured Brigade
- Nickname(s): La Nueve, La Española
- Engagements: Second World War: Falaise Pocket (1944); Paris (1944); Lorraine Campaign (1944); Colmar Pocket (1945)

Commanders
- Captain: Raymond Dronne
- Spanish Officer: Amado Granell

The 9th Company of the Régiment de marche du Tchad, part of the French 2nd Armored Division (also known as Division Leclerc) was nicknamed La Nueve (Spanish for "the nine"). The company consisted of 160 men under French command, 146 of whom were Spanish republicans including many anarchists, and French soldiers. All had fought during the liberation of French North Africa, and later participated in the Liberation of France.

The 9th Company's most notable military accomplishment was its important role in the Liberation of Paris. Men of La Nueve were the first to enter the French capital on the evening of 24 August 1944, with half-tracks bearing the names of the Spanish Civil War battles of Teruel and Guadalajara, and accompanied by engineering personnel and three tanks, Montmirail, Champaubert and Romilly, from the 501^{e} Régiment de chars de combat.

== Origins ==
After the victory of the Nationalist faction of General Francisco Franco in the Spanish Civil War, many thousands of refugees, many of whom were exiled Spanish Republicans had fled from Spain to Metropolitan France or French North Africa.

On the eve of the Second World War, France compelled male foreigners between 20 and 48 years old and entitled to the right of asylum—including Spanish republican exiles—to serve in the French Army, or to work in agriculture or industry, or on French defensive works. The military options included enrolling in the French Foreign Legion or the Marching Regiments of Foreign Volunteers; as the Foreign Legion was associated with the Francoist Spanish Legion, most opted for the Foreign Volunteers. Returning to Spain was not a safe option.

On 22 June 1940, Nazi Germany imposed an armistice on France; part remained under control of the French Vichy government until Germany took over the whole country in November 1942.

Following Operation Torch, the Allied invasion of North Africa, on 8 November 1942, the Free French authorities based in Algeria created the Corps Francs d'Afrique. This was a regular division intended for volunteer civilian combatants, which attracted many Spaniards, including Captain Miguel Buiza, the former head of the Spanish Republican Navy. The Spanish soldiers entered combat against the remains of the Afrika Corps, made up of German and Italian troops, in December 1942 in Tunisia. Fighting continued throughout the first half of 1943, until the conquest of the port city of Bizerte on 7 May, which marked the end of fighting in North Africa.

== Formation of the 9th Company ==
The choice was then given to the Spanish servicemen to be incorporated into either the 2nd Armored Division (Division Leclerc) or the forces of General Giraud, which had recently switched sides to join the Free French Forces. Given the formerly pro-Vichy sympathies of the latter, the majority chose to join Leclerc's unit. The Division Leclerc, under the command of General Philippe Leclerc, had been established in May 1943 in Chad as the 2nd Free French Division. In August of that year, after the fusion of the Free French Forces and the Army of Africa, it was rechristened the 2nd Armored Division. In the first half of 1943, it consisted of 16,000 men, of which 2,000 were Spanish. As Spanish soldiers were particularly numerous in the 9th Company, it became known as La Nueve or La Española.

Tricolor flag of the Second Spanish Republic.

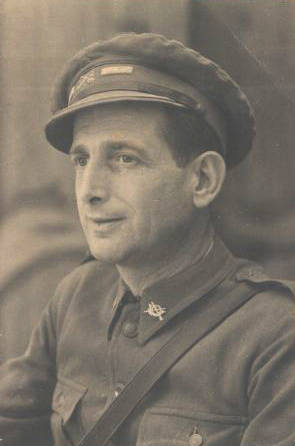
Amado Granell in 1936.

La Nueve was placed under command of a Frenchman, Captain Raymond Dronne, with the Spaniard Amado Granell serving as his lieutenant. The majority were socialists, communists, anarchists or unaffiliated men hostile to Franco, while others were deserters of concentration camps for Spanish refugees in Algeria and Morocco. While still fully integrated soldiers in the French Army, they were permitted to wear the tricolor Republican flag on their uniforms. As it was composed almost entirely of Spanish soldiers, Spanish was used as the common language within the company and the officers also came from the Spanish ranks.

In September 1943, the company, as part of the greater 2nd Division, was transferred to Rabat, in Morocco, where the division received American supplies: 160 M4 Sherman tanks, 280 armored M3 half-tracks and M8 Greyhounds, Dodge, GMC, Brockway, and Diamond trucks and a number of jeeps. The Spanish soldiers gave their vehicles original names, for the most part honoring events from the Spanish Civil War. The command unit's jeep was christened "Mort aux cons" (French for "death to dopes"), and its half-track, "Les Cosaques" (French for "the Cossacks"). The 1st combat section called their vehicles "Don Quichotte" (French for "Don Quixote"), "Cap Serrat", "Madrid" "Guernica", and "Les Pingouins" (French for "the penguins"), after the nickname "Espingouins", given by French soldiers to the Spanish servicemen (the name "Buenaventura Durruti", proposed by the anarchists, had been refused by the French superior officers). The 2nd combat section gave their half-tracks the names "Résistance", "Teruel", "España Cañi" (later "Libération"), "Nous Voilà" (French for "Here we are") and "Ebro". The 3rd combat section named their half-tracks "Tunisie", "Brunete", "Amiral Buiza", "Guadalajara", "El Canguro" (Spanish for "The Kangaroo") and "Santander"; also used were the names "Catapulte" (French for "catapult"), "Belchite", and "Rescousse" (French for "rescue") for the towing half-track. The crew members of Spanish origin were also authorized to paint the flag of the Second Spanish Republic on their armored vehicles.

== Operations: From Normandy to Berchtesgaden ==
The 2nd Armored Division was transferred from Morocco to Great Britain, only arriving in Normandy at the beginning of August 1944. The 9th Company landed on Utah Beach during the night of 31 July – 1 August 1944. The 2nd Armored Division was at that point integrated into the Third United States Army, led by General George Patton. La Nueve engaged in combat against German units on the outskirts of Château-Gontier and Alençon, and from 13 to 18 August, fought in the vanguard of the division at Écouché. The 2nd Armored Division was attacked by the Waffen-SS, Adolf Hitler and Das Reich divisions, the 9th and 116th Panzer divisions and the 3rd Parachute Division, with fighting lasting until the arrival of the 2nd British Army in reinforcement. The company's anarchists revealed their courageous character during this battle, as one mortar unit carried out a coup de main attack 3 km behind German lines on 14 August, taking 130 German prisoners, capturing 13 vehicles and liberating 8 Americans.

The city of Paris revolted against the German occupation on 20 August 1944. General Charles de Gaulle urged the Supreme Allied Command to allow the French troops to support the insurrection, backing Leclerc, who wanted to take advantage of the rebellion led by the French Resistance to quickly liberate Paris. On 23 August 1944, La Nueve set off towards Paris with the rest of the division. Around 8:00 pm on 24 August, accompanied by a squadron of tanks from the 501^{e} Régiment de chars de combat, the 9th Company entered Paris through the Porte d'Italie. At 9:22 pm, the section led by Amado Granell was the first to reach the Hôtel de Ville, and the half-track "Ebro" fired the first shots against a group of German machine guns. Subsequently, Lieutenant Granell, ex-superior officer of the Spanish Republican Army, was the first "French" officer to be received by the National Council of the Resistance within City Hall. While awaiting the surrender of the German General Dietrich von Choltitz, Governor of Paris, La Nueve was sent to occupy the Chamber of Deputies, the Hôtel Majestic (headquarters of the German military high command in France) and the Place de la Concorde. In the afternoon of 25 August, at 3:30 pm, the German garrison surrendered, and General von Choltitz was held prisoner by Spanish soldiers until being handed over to a French officer.

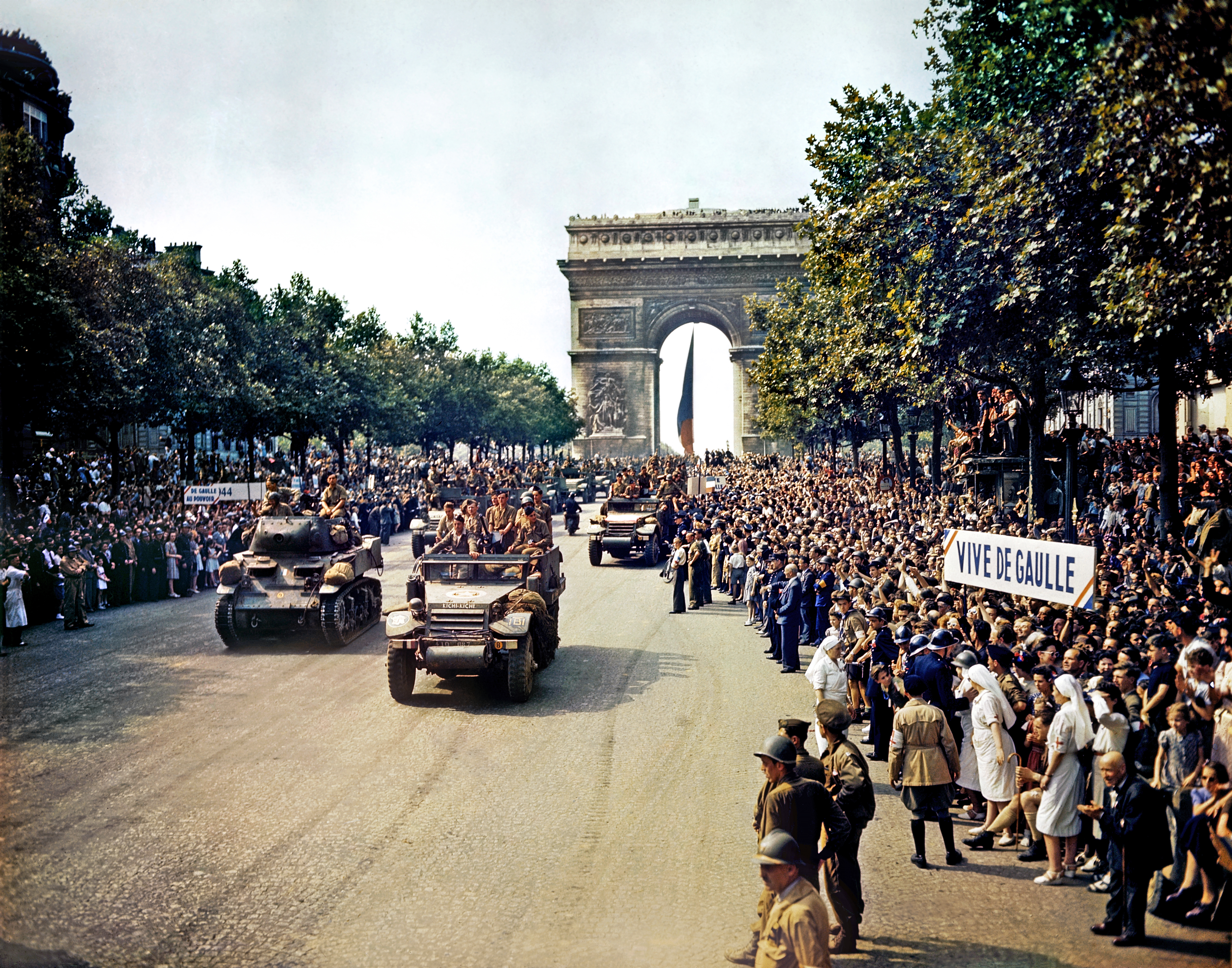
Units of the 2nd Armored Division parade along the Champs-Élysées after the Liberation of Paris

The next day, Allied troops entered Paris in triumph. The Spanish soldiers participated in the victory parade, with four half-tracks chosen to form General De Gaulle's escort along the Champs-Elysées. They paraded under the flag of the Second Spanish Republic, and a giant banner sporting the same colours was used for several minutes during the opening of the parade. The 9th Company was then stationed in the Bois de Boulogne from 27 August to 9 September, before heading off to combat once more. On 12 September, the company distinguished itself in the capture of Andelot, during which 300 German soldiers were taken prisoner. On 15 September, the men of La Nueve crossed the Moselle river at Châtel-sur-Moselle and established a bridgehead against the German lines. The company's merit did not go unnoticed, with General De Gaulle personally awarding medals to the soldiers in the city of Nancy on 26 September. Captain Raymond Dronne, Canarian sub-lieutenant Miguel Campos, Catalan sergeant Fermín Pujol and the Galician corporal Cariño López all received the Médaille militaire and Croix de guerre 1939–1945. Combat in Alsace began in November 1944, and La Nueve entered into Strasbourg, the last big French city under occupation, on 23 November. On 1 January 1945, Captain Raymond Dronne paid his respects to his troops in a letter:

The Spanish have fought remarkably. They are tricky to command but have a great deal of courage and combat experience. Some of them are experiencing a clear moral crisis due to the losses we've suffered and above all to the events in Spain.

The 2nd Armored Division was relieved of active duty at the end of February for fifty days of rest, in the Châteauroux region. At the end of April they resumed combat, fighting until the capture of the Eagle's Nest, on 5 May in Berchtesgaden. By this time, the losses suffered by La Nueve had reached 35 dead and 97 wounded. No more than 16 Spaniards were left active in La Nueve, with many having been assigned to other units in the French army. At the end of the war, a few followed Leclerc to Indochina, several left with armoured vehicles in the direction of Francoist Spain, while others returned to civilian life. Many refused the French citizenship offered to them for having fought within the French army, feeling "betrayed" by the Allies who did not take up the cause against fascism in Spain.

More than fifty members of the company received the Croix de Guerre.

== Aftermath and tributes ==
The role of these Spanish soldiers was quickly forgotten, or omitted for political reasons. This has been changing in the 21st century, however, as their role in the liberation of France, especially of Paris, has been highlighted by a series of commemorations.

On 25 August 2004, the City of Paris officially paid homage to the Spaniards of La Nueve. A plaque, with the inscription "Aux républicains espagnols, composante principale de la colonne Dronne" ("to the Spanish republicans, principal component of the Dronne column") was inaugurated on the Quai Henri IV, in the presence of then-mayor Bertrand Delanoë, then-president of the Spanish Senate, Francisco Javier Rojo, the Spanish ambassador to France at the time, Francisco Villar, and two of the surviving members of the company, Luis Royo Ibañez and Manuel Fernández. A similar plaque was placed in the Square Gustave-Mesureur, Place Pinel (13th Arrondissement) and another at the centre of the Place Nationale (also in the 13th).

On 24 February 2010, veterans of La Nueve Luis Royo Ibañez, Manuel Fernández and Rafael Gómez were awarded the Médaille Grand Vermeil, the highest such award granted by the City of Paris.

In 2014, the association 24 Août 1944 ("24 August 1944") organized a series of marches following the route of La Nueve through Paris in commemoration of the 70th anniversary of its liberation. Also in attendance was Rafael Gómez, who, as of 20 April 2017, was the last remaining veteran of La Nueve still alive.

In March 2015, in Paris, the garden of the Hôtel de Ville was renamed the Jardin des Combattants de la Nueve (French for "Garden of the Soldiers of La Nueve"). A ceremony was due to take place in the presence of the King and Queen of Spain, Felipe VI and Letizia, as well as the Mayor of Paris, Anne Hidalgo; however, the crash of Germanwings Flight 9525, where 51 Spanish citizens lost their lives, cut short the royal visit, and the ceremony was rescheduled for 3 June 2015.

In a ceremony in April 2017, the Mayors of Madrid and Paris, Manuela Carmena and Anne Hidalgo, officially renamed a municipal park in the Pueblo Nuevo neighborhood of Madrid as the Jardín de los Combatientes de La Nueve (Spanish for "Garden of the Soldiers of La Nueve").

The last surviving member of La Nueve, Rafael Gómez Nieto, died in Strasbourg on March 31, 2020, at the age of 99, a victim of the COVID-19 pandemic.

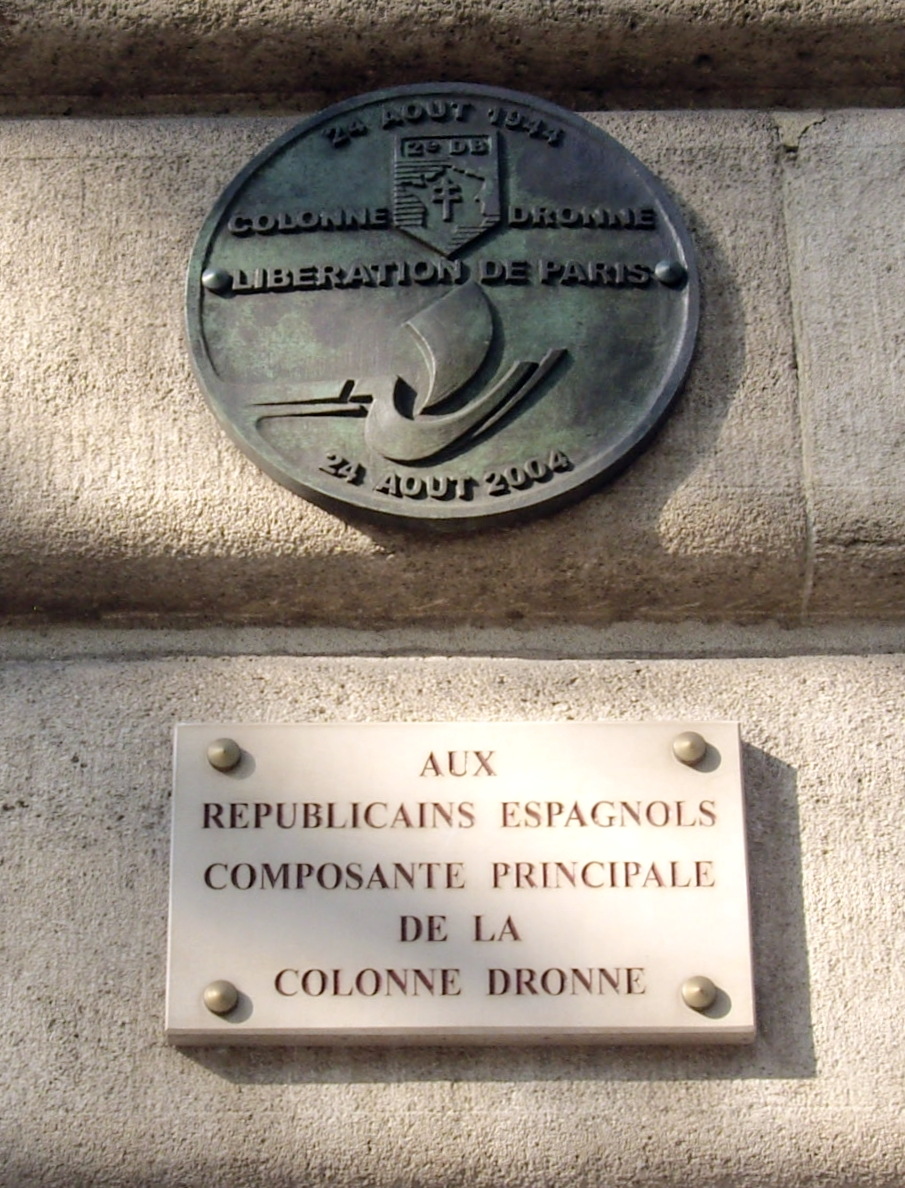
Plaque in commemoration of the Spanish soldiers of La Nueve, affixed to the annexe building of the Hôtel de Ville, on the corner of Quai de l'Hôtel de Ville and Rue de Lobau (4th Arrondissement).

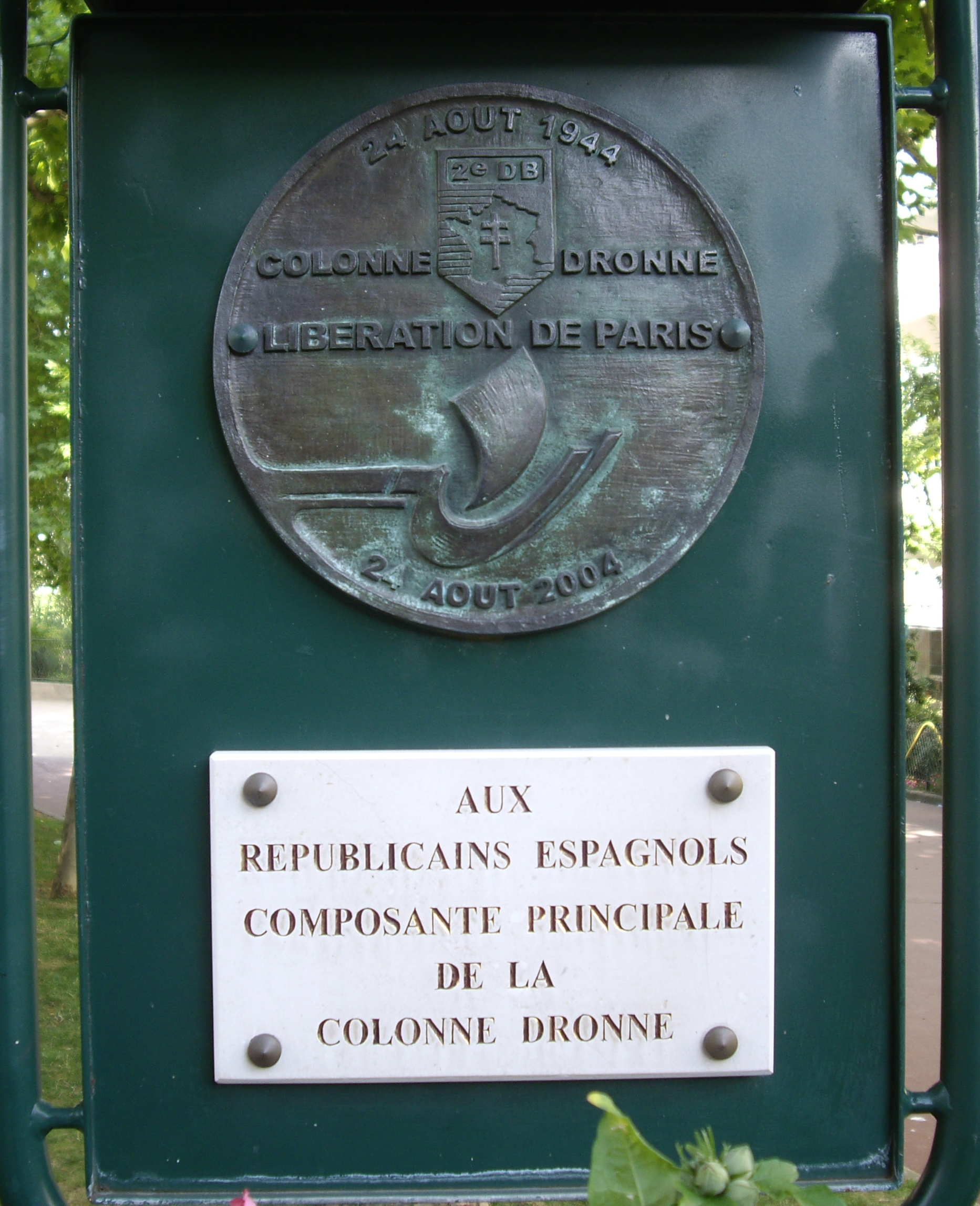
Plaque in honour of the Spanish soldiers of La Nueve, in the Square Gustave-Mesurer, Place Pinel (13th Arrondissement).

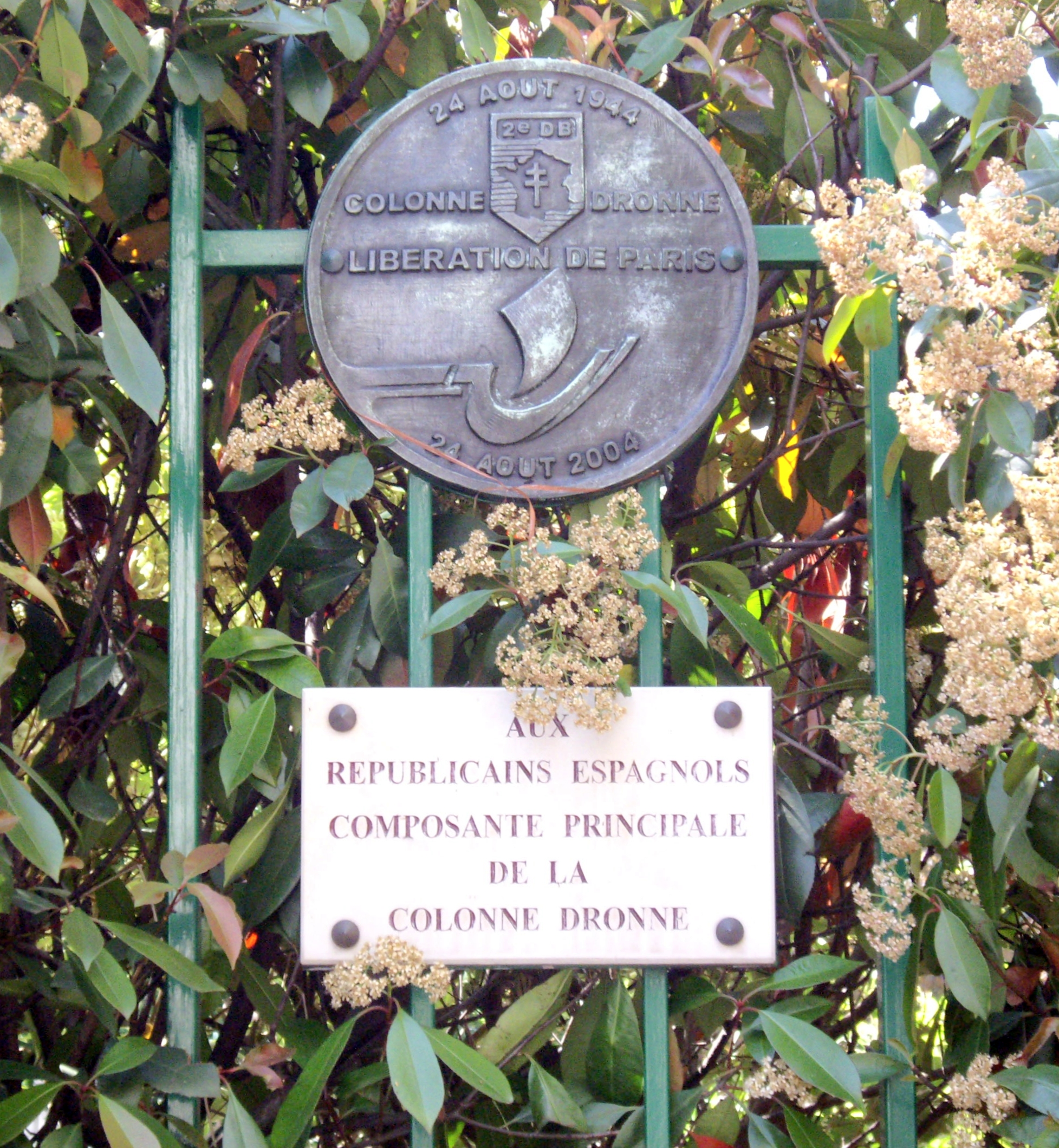
Plaque in honor of the Spanish soldiers of La Nueve, placed in the centre of the Place Nationale (13th Arrondissement)

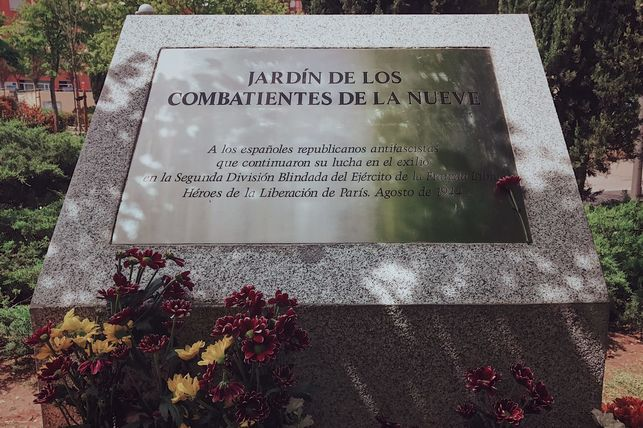
Plaque in honour of the soldiers of La Nueve, in the Jardín de los Combatientes de La Nueve in Madrid.

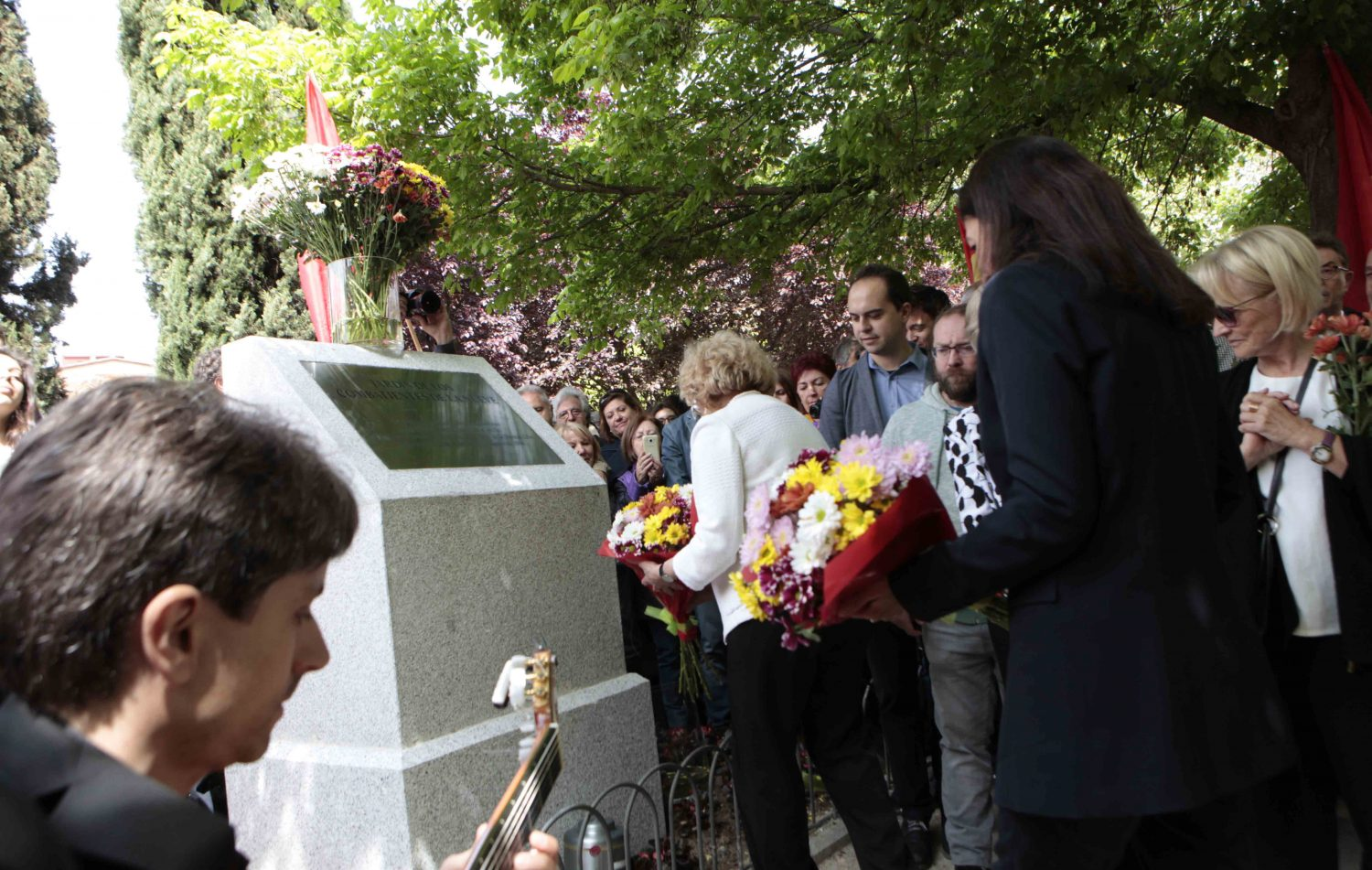
The mayors of Madrid and Paris, Manuela Carmena and Anne Hidalgo, inaugurating the Jardín de los Combatientes de La Nueve in Madrid.

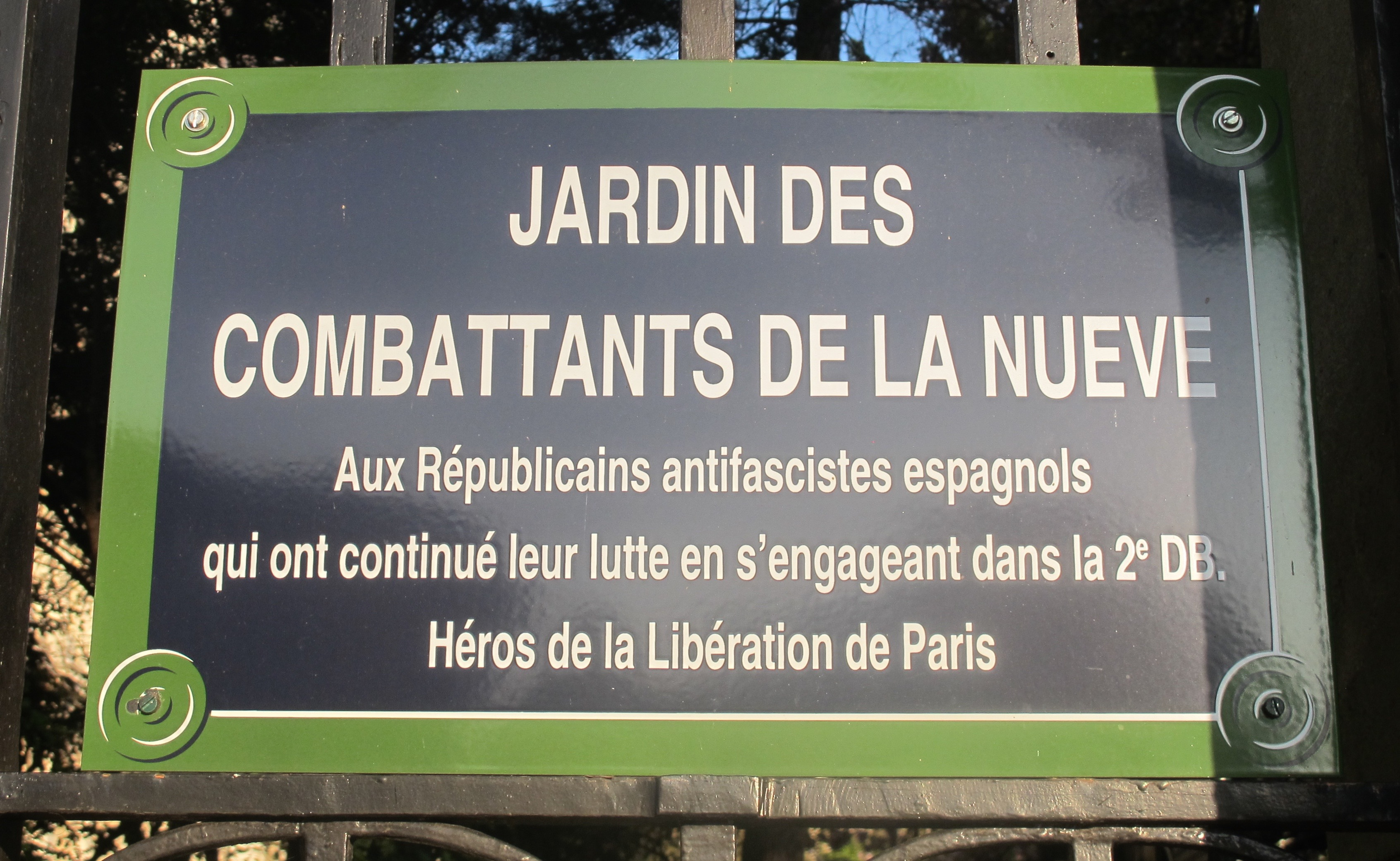
Official street sign of the garden in Paris.

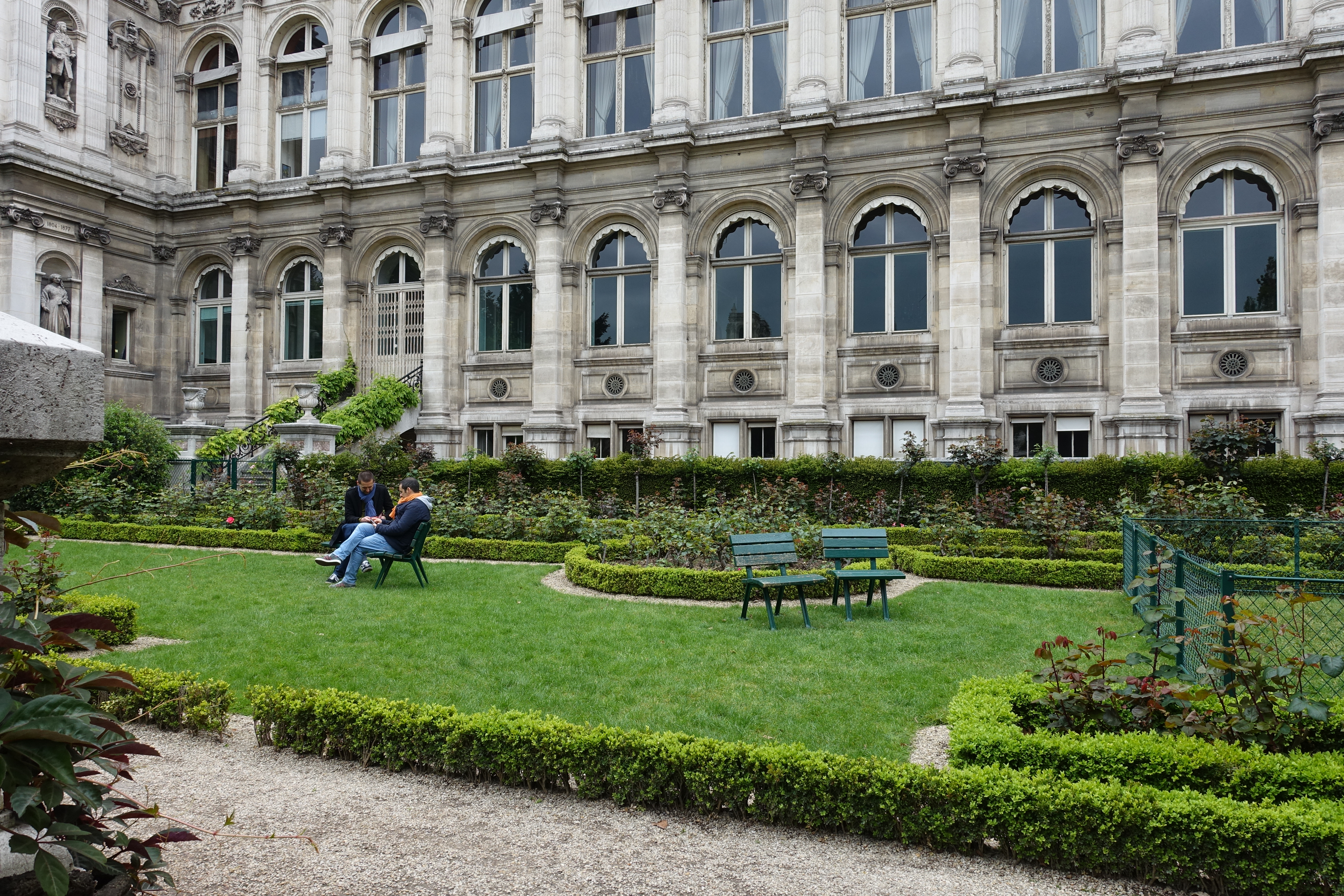
Jardin des Combattants-de-la-Nueve, Paris Hôtel-de-Ville

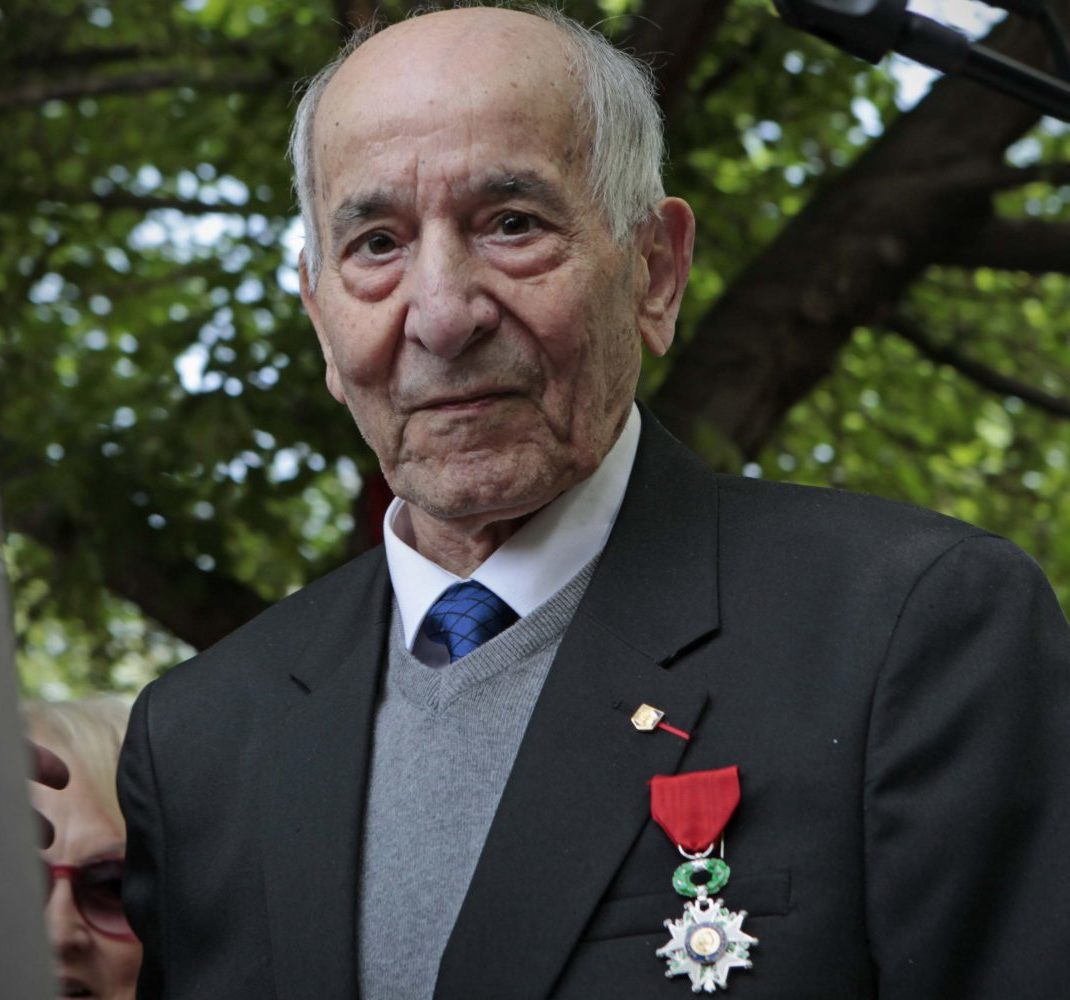
Rafael Gómez Nieto in 2017
