= Amado Granell =

Spanish military officer

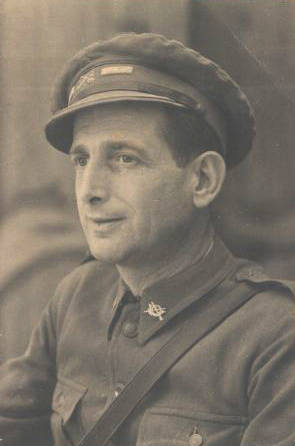
- Granell during the civil war
- Born: Amado Granell Mesado; 5 November 1898; Burriana, Spain
- Died: 12 May 1972 (aged 73); Valencia, Spain
- Military career
- Allegiance: Kingdom of Spain; Spanish Republic; Free France
- Branch: Spanish Legion; Spanish Republican Army; French Foreign Legion
- Service years: 1921–1945
- Unit: Iron Column
- Commands: 49th Mixed Brigade
- Conflicts: Spanish Civil War; World War II

Amado Granell Mesado (5 November 1898 – 12 May 1972) was a Spanish military officer. He served on the Republican side in the Spanish Civil War before joining the French Foreign Legion. In France, he fought against Nazi Germany during World War II. He led a column of La Nueve of the 2nd Armoured Brigade, which consisted of Spanish combatants, and was the first Allied military unit to enter Paris after being occupied by the Wehrmacht. As such, he appeared on the cover of the newspaper Libération after the Liberation of Paris and met with the leader of French Resistance, Georges Bidault.

== Early life ==
Amado Granell Mesado was the son of a woodsman from Burriana, Spain, and enlisted in the Spanish Legion in 1921; he reached the rank of sergeant. While in the service, his father's boat sank during a cruise and Granell returned to the family home for economic reasons. After he married his wife Aurora, the couple operated a motorcycle shop in Orihuela until the Spanish Civil War occurred in 1936.

== Spanish Civil War ==
In Orihuela, Granell joined the Comité de Enlace Antifascista and in September, the Volunteer Army, which was formed to defend the Second Spanish Republic. He was assigned to the Iron Column. In 1937, Granell was promoted to major and given control of the Regimiento Motorizado de Ametralladoras, which was composed of about 1,200 men. He and the unit participated in the defense of Madrid.

He was later made commander of the 49th Mixed Brigade of the Spanish Republican Army (Ejército Popular Republicano), which defended the city of Castellón, but by 15 June 1938, the army retreated southwards. On 29 March 1939, with the collapse of the Republic, Granell sailed from Alicante on the merchant ship Stanbrook to Oran in French Algeria, along with 2,700 others.

== World War II ==
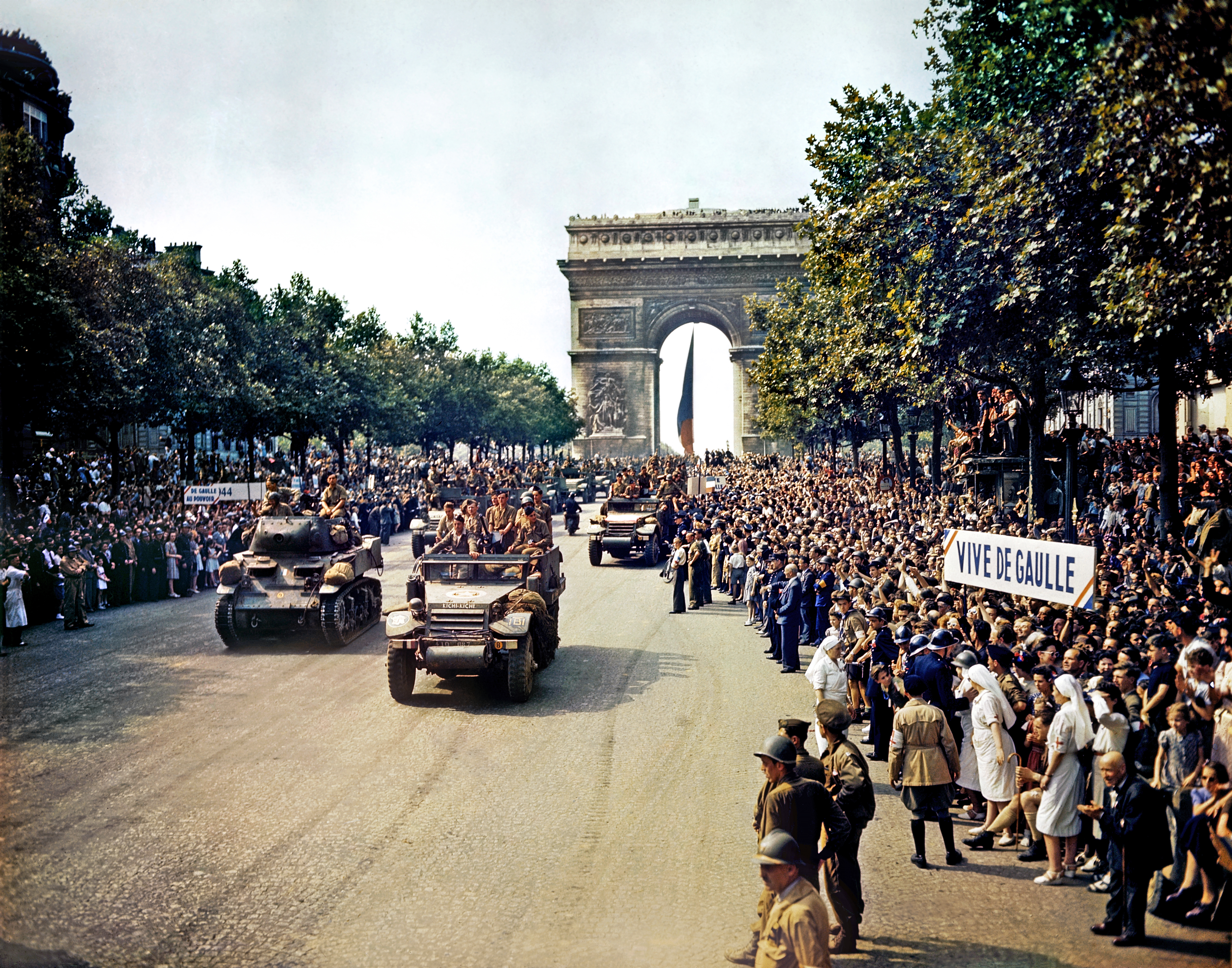
The 2nd Armored Division victory parade in Paris on the Champs-Élysées, near the Arc de Triomphe on 26 August 1944.

After spending time in camps that were created by the French colonial authorities, Granell and other ex-combatants were released by Anglo-American forces at the end of the Western Desert Campaign. He then enlisted in the French Foreign Legion; he first joined the Marching Regiment of Chad, which was later integrated into the 2nd Armored Division under General Philippe Leclerc.

The 2nd Armored Division was transferred to England and, after a period of training, was moved to France following the Normandy landings. On 1 August 1944, the 9th Chad Regiment composed of Spanish fighters organized by Granell landed on Utah Beach. The regiment arrived at Paris on 24 August 1944. Without waiting for orders from the Allied command, and as a matter of honor, Leclerc ordered Captain Raymond Dronne, commander of the 9th Company, to enter the city in anticipation of U.S. forces. At 9:00 pm, two sections of 9th Company, one headed by Dronne and the other by Granell, entered the French capital and advanced towards city hall. Granell met with resistance leader Georges Bidault, who had already been stationed there. A photographer took their photo which appeared on the front page of Libération the following day. (Note: Erroneously, the newspaper reported that the soldier who appeared in the picture was a Frenchman named "Bronne" referring to Captain Raymond Dronne who led the other column of the 9th Company into Paris.)

After the liberation of Paris, La Nueve was transferred to the German front, where Granell actively participated in taking the Eagle's Nest, the holiday retreat of Adolf Hitler in the Bavarian Alps. Of the 144 men who composed the first La Nueve that landed in Normandy, only 16 survived the war. Ninety-six of the deceased were former Spanish Republican soldiers.

== Post-war life ==
After the war, Granell received the Legion of Honour from Leclerc, but rejected an offer of promotion to commander of the French army, which would have required him to become a French citizen.

In France, he acted as an intermediary between monarchist politicians and Spanish Republicans in a program sponsored by the U.S. and the U.K. The program was trying to locate Juan de Bourbón, who was heir to the Spanish throne before the war. For this reason and on behalf of Francisco Largo Caballero, Granell met with José María Gil Robles Sr. in Lisbon on 4 April 1946, but the operation to find Prince Juan failed.

An agreement was made between Don Juan and General Franco that Prince Juan was to be made the future head of state.

Granell stepped away from politics after his failure to overthrow the Francoist regime.

In 1950, he opened a restaurant in Paris, which became a meeting point for the Spanish Republicans. He later returned to Spain, where he lived in Santander, Valencia, and Alicante.

=== Death ===
Granell died in a road traffic accident near the town of Valencia on 12 May 1972 when he was heading to the French consulate in Valencia to be paid for his service as a French army officer.
