= Hôtel de Ville, Châtillon =

Town hall in Châtillon, Hauts-de-Seine, France

Hôtel de Ville
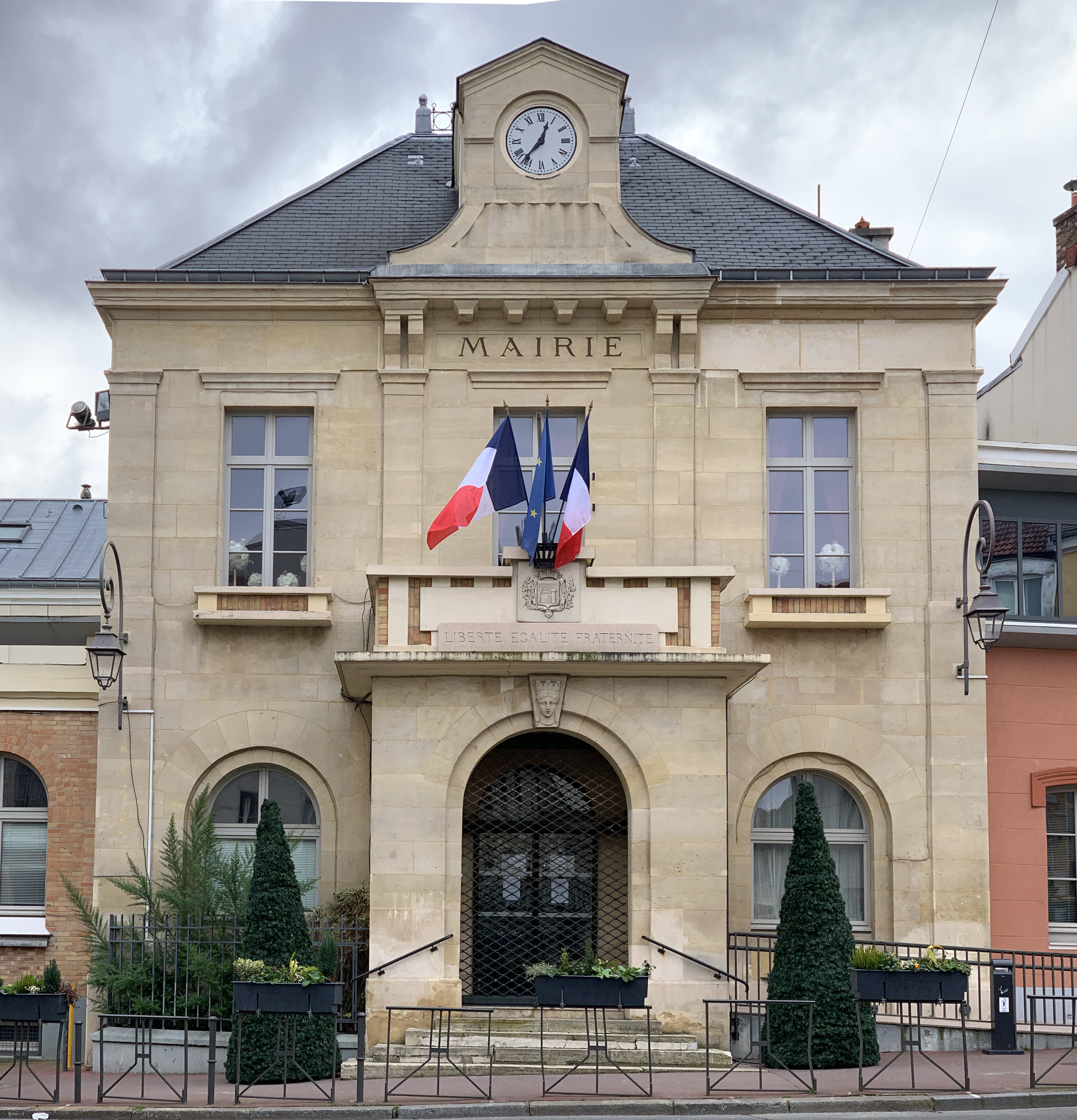
- The main frontage of the Hôtel de Ville in January 2021

General information
- Type: City hall
- Architectural style: Neoclassical style
- Location: Châtillon, France
- Coordinates: 48.7997°N 2.2897°E
- Completed: 1838

Design and construction
- Architect: Claude Naissant

The Hôtel de Ville (French pronunciation: [otɛl də vil], City Hall) is a municipal building in Châtillon, Hauts-de-Seine, in the southwestern suburbs of Paris, standing on Place de la Libération. It has been included on the Inventaire général des monuments by the French Ministry of Culture since 1994.

== History ==
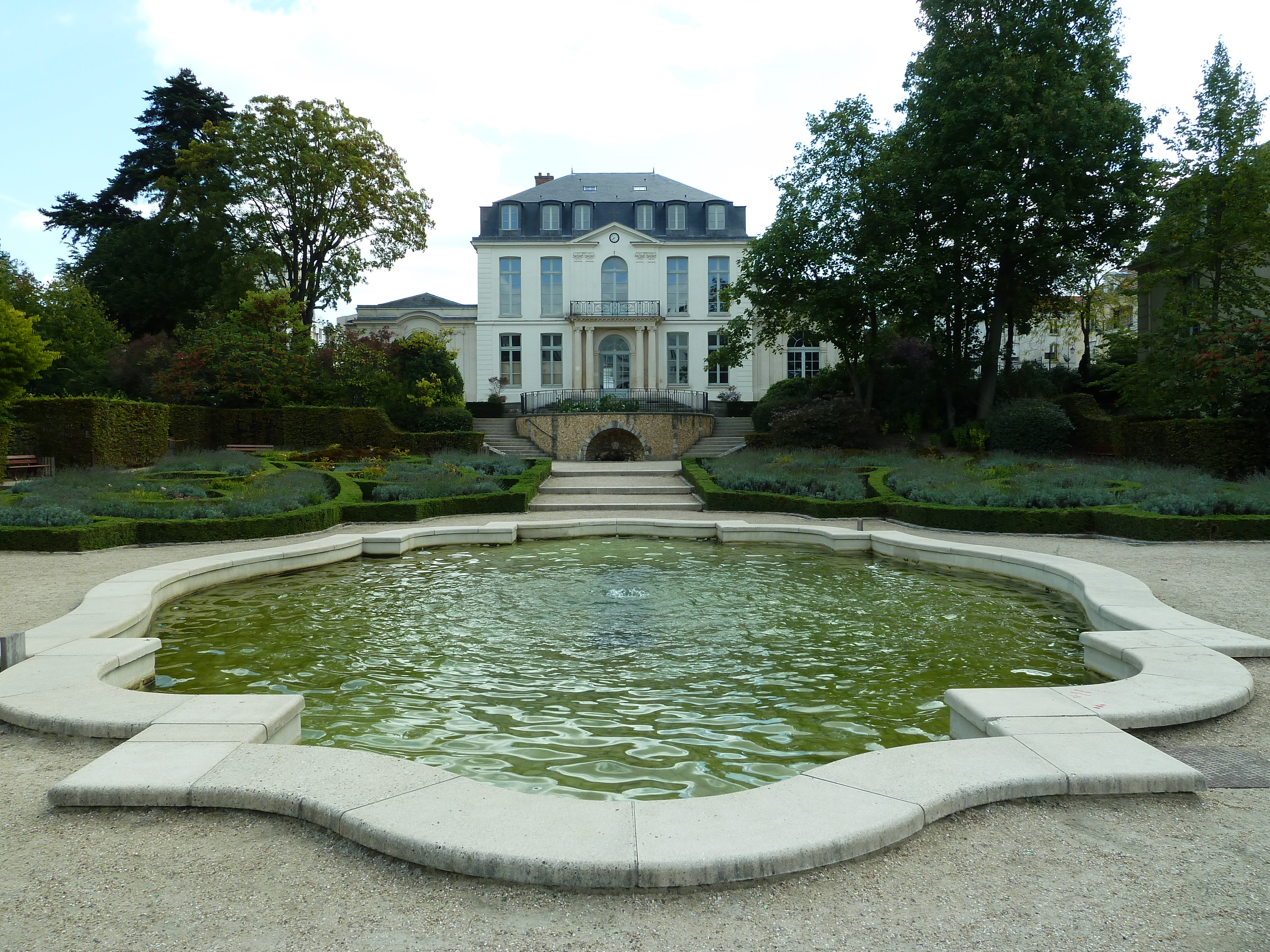
The Folie Desmares, where council meetings are now held

Following the French Revolution, the town council initially met at the Church of Saint-Philippe-Saint-Jacques. This arrangement continued until 1791, when the council started renting a small house from Sieur Bourbon-Penthièvre. In 1838, the council decided to commission a combined town hall and school for boys. The site they selected was opposite the church. The new building was designed by Claude Naissant in the neoclassical style, built in ashlar stone and was completed in 1851.

The design involved a symmetrical main frontage of three bays facing onto the street. The central bay featured a porch with a round headed opening, voussoirs and a keystone, preceded by four steps and surmounted by a balustraded balcony. On the first floor, there was a French door flanked by pilasters supporting a clock with a triangular pediment. The outer bays were fenestrated by round headed windows with voussoirs on the ground floor and by casement windows with cornices on the first floor. Internally, the principal room was the Salle des Mariages (wedding room).

The adjacent building to the east, which was set back from the road, was originally used a crèche before being acquired by the council for use as a tax collection office in 1930.

On 19 August 1944, during the Second World War, the local liberation committee took possession of the town hall and flew the tricolour from the flagpole. This was just a week before the liberation of the town by the French 2nd Armoured Division, commanded by General Philippe Leclerc, on 25 August 1944.

In the early 1980s, after finding the town hall too cramped for council meetings, the council acquired Folie Desmares, a large private house on the west side of Rue de la Gare, about 200 metres (660 ft) to the north of the town hall. The original house on the site was commissioned by the dance master, Claude Bellon, and completed in the early 18th century. It was then acquired by a Swiss banker, Antoine Hogguer, for the actress, Charlotte Desmares, who was his mistress. The floors above ground were then completely rebuilt in the neoclassical style, to a design by François Debias Aubrybuilt, in 1728. It became a refuge operated by the Dominicaines de Notre-Dame de Grâce (Dominican Sisters of our Lady of Grace) in 1880 and was acquired by the council in 1984.
