= Germaine Brée =

French-American literary scholar (1907–2001)

- Brée in April 1985
- Born: 2 October 1907; Paris, France
- Died: 22 September 2001 (aged 93); Winston-Salem, North Carolina
- Citizenship: France; United States (since 1952)

Academic background
- Education: University of Paris

Academic work
- Discipline: Literary studies
- Sub-discipline: 20th-century French literature
- Institutions: Bryn Mawr College; New York University; Wake Forest University

Germaine Brée (/ʒərˈmeɪn breɪ/ zher-MAYN BRAY; 2 October 1907 – 22 September 2001) was a French-American literary scholar, who wrote extensively on Marcel Proust, Andre Gide, Albert Camus, and Jean-Paul Sartre.

== Life ==
Born in Paris, Germaine Brée grew up in the English-speaking Channel Islands. After graduating from the University of Paris, she taught in Algeria from 1932 to 1936. Appointed to teach at Bryn Mawr in 1936, she was caught abroad when World War II began in 1939. She joined the Rochambeau Group, a volunteer ambulance unit organized in New York, later known as the Rochambelles. The ambulance group, taken into the Free French forces, became the first women's unit integrated in the French Army, joining the Second Armored Division of General Leclerc in Morocco in October 1943. Two months later, with the death of her mother, she left the ambulance group and was assigned to the intelligence section of the Free French in Algiers. Promoted to the rank of lieutenant, she received a Bronze Star and was named to the Legion of Honor. At this time Brée befriended Albert Camus.

In 1952, Brée gained her American citizenship. The following year, Brée was appointed chair of the French department at New York University College of Arts & Science, the second woman to be appointed a department chair at the university. From 1960 until 1973 she was Professor of French at the University of Wisconsin. From 1973 until 1984 she was Kenan professor of humanities at Wake Forest University. In 1975 she served as president of the Modern Language Association. She was an elected member of both the American Philosophical Society and the American Academy of Arts and Sciences.

Brée died in her home in Winston-Salem, North Carolina on 22 September 2001 at the age of 93.

== Works ==
- Marcel Proust and Deliverance From Time, 1955
- Camus, 1959
- Gide, 1963
- Camus and Sartre: Crisis and Commitment, 1972
- Women Writers in France, 1973
