= Rafael Gómez Nieto =

Spanish soldier (1921–2020)

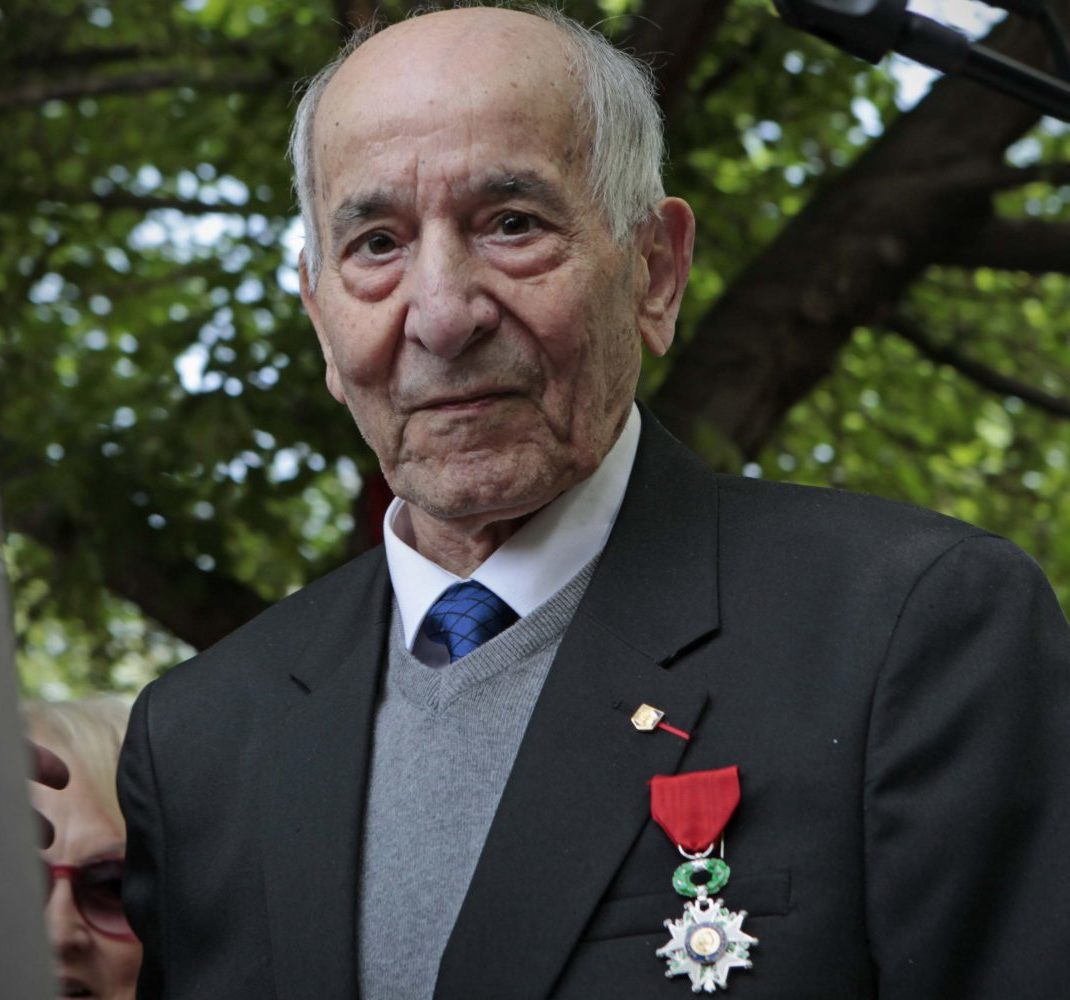
- Gómez in 2017 during the inauguration of the Jardín de los Combatientes de La Nueve in Madrid
- Born: 21 January 1921; Almería, Andalusia, Kingdom of Spain
- Died: 31 March 2020 (aged 99); Strasbourg, France
- Military career
- Allegiance: Spanish Republic (1938–1939); France (1939–1982)
- Branch: Spanish Republican Army (1938–1939); Free French Forces (1939–1945); French Army (1945–1982)
- Service years: 1938–1982
- Unit: La Nueve
- Conflicts: Spanish Civil War: Battle of Ebro; World War II: Falaise Pocket; Liberation of Paris; Algerian War
- Awards: Legion of Honour; Medal of the City of Paris

Rafael Gómez Nieto (21 January 1921 – 31 March 2020) was a Spanish soldier and veteran of the Spanish Civil War and World War II.

== Biography ==
Born in Adra, Almería (Spain), Gómez Nieto moved to Badalona, where he was called up to the "Lleva del Biberó" and fought for the Spanish Republican Army in the Battle of the Ebro (July–November 1938).

After the war, he went to France where he was interned in the Saint-Cyprien camp. Four months later he was able to reach Algeria with his father, who was in the Argelés internment camp. After the invasion of North Africa by the Allies during World War II, he became part of the 9th Company (La Nueve) of the French 2nd Armored Division. This company, made up predominantly of Spanish Republicans, was the first Allied military unit that entered Paris after its occupation by the Wehrmacht. 146 of the 160 men in the company were Spaniards. Only a dozen survived the war.

Gómez Nieto died on 31 March 2020, at a nursing home in Strasbourg, France, from COVID-19 during the coronavirus pandemic. He had lived in that city since 1955. He was the last living survivor of La Nueve.
