= Écouché in World War II =

World War II for Écouché culminated with several days of street fighting by Free French forces under General Philippe Leclerc. This engagement was part of the encirclement of the remaining German army in the final engagement of the Battle of Normandy. This final carnage of the German army was later called the Falaise Pocket, the Argentan-Falaise Pocket or Couloir de la Mort (Corridor of Death) as the local French named it.

Falaise Pocket 17 Aug 1944

During World War II Écouché’s buildings and homes suffered 15% heavy damage from aerial bombing and street fighting during the liberation. Most of the destruction followed the heavy bombing of the targeted railroad tracks, although the targets were never hit during two attempts.

Local residents think of the war years as divided into three phases:

- The Phony war (la Drole de guerre) –1 September 1939 to June 1940
  - General mobilisation
  - The "Phony war"
  - The exodus or "Exode"
- German occupation – June 1940 to August 1944
  - Military control, requisitions, restrictions
  - Local and national upheaval
  - Problems of supply shortages
- Liberation – summer 1944
  - Aerial bombing and the Allied Landing on D-day, 6 June 1944
  - Battles for Liberation – 13–15 August 1944

== The Phony war ==
According to the census of 1936 there were 1179 residents (Ecubéens) in Écouché. By June 1940 this figure had been considerably reduced. There were so many young men missing. Five soldiers from Écouché were killed in action, adding to the 100,000 French soldiers who perished in three weeks of fighting during the disastrous spring of 1940.

Another thirty were taken prisoner, but were expected to return after the armistice with Germany. Marshal Philippe Pétain, the "hero who dedicated himself to France", had inspired confidence that all would be well. Disillusionment came all too soon. The French soldiers were prisoners of war in German camps. The women who sent parcels to their husbands were considered fortunate. At least they knew their men were alive.

The citizens were resigned to a life of survival; the economy had collapsed, there were frequent requisitions, and shortages of virtually everything, especially in town.

Ecouché is surrounded by farmland, thus farm produce was distributed, either exchanged in complex negotiations, or given freely through networks of families and friends.

== German military occupation ==
Generally the various groups of soldiers were divided up amongst the hotels and the bigger houses. For example:The large house at no. 5 place Lefevre Lemercier, known at the time as the ‘place du Fourneau’, housed about 20 soldiers. An officer would conduct a drill every morning in the square out front.

The officers were quartered in private houses and met up at the Kommandantur, an office which changed premises several times eventually remaining at number 3 Grande Rue.

Écouché housed a cavalry unit; stables and horses had also been requisitioned from the locals. It consisted of about 100 men aged between 18 and 45 years. The German Army depended enormously on horse drawn transportation.

Officially there was no interaction between residents of Ecouché and the occupiers. Citizens kept their doors and shutters closed when soldiers marched by in goose-step. Nevertheless, at the hotel, relationships developed.

Apart from patrol duties, the soldiers spent a lot of time making music, even giving concerts from time to time.

"There was not a single shot fired, ever."

== Daily life ==
From sunset to dawn a curfew was enforced. No lights were supposed to be visible. Windows which couldn't be obscured with thick double curtains or full shutters, had to be blacked out.

During the daytime, certain vehicles, such as doctors’ cars were allowed on the roads, but fuel was scarce. Some shop-keepers used vans running on gasogene to transport supplies, but the engines were weak. Even horses for wagons and carriages were difficult to find, as many had been requisitioned for use by the German Army.

There were steam trains in limited circulation. People walked or used bicycles with solid tyres, since it was impossible to find any inner tubes. Therefore, there was, very little traffic on the roads.

Even walking posed problems, as shoes were rationed. However, anyone could get hold of shoes with wooden soles without using a ration ticket. These were uncomfortable, fragile and certainly not waterproof.

A shortage of fabrics made prices soar. Clothes were patched up. Knitting was unpicked to reknit other garments. A red sweater became two or three pairs of long red socks. Reduced wardrobes meant people rarely changed clothes, but those aspiring to elegance painted false stockings on their legs with liquid chicory.

Washing clothes was not easy. Washing powder was eventually replaced by ashes or by using infusions of plants such as soapwort, which lathers like soap. Ivy was used for black garments, worn by the numerous women in mourning.

The tubes taken from redundant bicycle pumps were used as moulds for the manufacture of candles made with lard, the wicks made from cotton, which itself was recycled from old hand-crocheted curtains.

There was electricity, but power cuts were often and after the June 44 bombings there was no electricity at all for nearly two years. Otherwise, rationing, implemented by a system of tickets, went on for several years after the war.

The only source of heat in the home was the wood stove in the kitchen. This was supposed to heat the whole house, but was seldom efficient enough to do more than cooking and hot water.

With an abundant countryside nearby, the problem of finding enough food was manageable, compared to some of the larger towns. As a result, the young women's boarding school was filled with children from the towns, sent by parents who were desperate to find a way to feed them. Eggs, milk, butter, meat, vegetables, cereals were not really in short supply and everyone had a garden.

Apart from that, as everywhere, there were shortages of things like sugar, flour, oil, chocolate, coffee and bread, which was grey because it was made with bran.

== Resistance and collaboration ==
In the early spring of 1944, resistance operations intensified rapidly. The sabotage of telephone lines, plus frequent parachute drops of weapons and supplies created a demand for suitable hiding places. The recovery of airmen rescued from crashes increased as well as the need to find secure escape routes for vulnerable Resistants.

In reprisal, the requisitioning of men for the surveillance of the railway lines was widespread (sabotage of an assigned line meant a firing squad), effected by threats of arrest and deportation. Direct denunciations were made, sometimes by French people influenced by Nazi propaganda, sometimes by anonymous letters, ending in the arrest of men and women who were to experience imprisonment, interrogation, torture and deportation.

On the other hand, summary executions, sometimes ill-informed, were carried out by the Resistance, contributing to the stress and confusion preceding the Allied Landing. The mayor of the adjacent commune of Joué du Plain and a Belgian interpreter used by the Germans were both assassinated by the Resistance.

The secretary of the town hall produced false ration cards to access ration tickets. She was denounced and deported to Germany, to a concentration camp, she came back, but was never fully recovered. Locals recall German military trucks, or lorries, setting out with their cargoes of requisitioned hostages. They rarely came back.

Locals learned that M. Leguerney, a resistant, was machine-gunned in his car in the Joué du Plain. Shot on 27 April, he died on 5 May and was buried on the 9th at Francheville.

Parachute drops took place generally near Brûlevain wood towards Rânes, ground with the code name Levite Ouest 136, and also in the valley near the Château de la Motte at Joué du Plain. At Sentilly, aircraft landed and took off straight away after collecting or dropping off a passenger, who quickly vanished into the darkness. These operations never took place in Ecouché proper, but always in the nearby countryside.

== The bombing of Écouché, 6 June 1944 ==
On 6 June, Ecouché was bombed by two consecutive formations of planes at high altitude: in less than a minute, more than a fifteen percent of the town was destroyed. A third formation flew on to bomb nearby Argentan.

Rescue teams, mobilized by municipality and civil defense organizations, recovered the bodies and took them to the church of Notre Dame where there were kept overnight.

This bombing destroyed several businesses: two hotels, one garage, and three grocery stores. The boys’ school was leveled and the railway station was badly damaged; the tree allies of the fairground had their treetops lopped and blown to bits. The target for the bombers, the railroad tracks, was undamaged.

A second bombing in July 1944 destroyed a block of houses at the end of rue Notre Dame near the main road, consisting of some businesses and the post office; there were no victims as the inhabitants had vacated their dwellings.

Amidst all these sufferings, three stories could be mentioned:

- The Trévin family of the main hotel in town, destroyed on 6 June. Buried under the rubble were: Madame Trévin and her daughter Jeanne. On the same day at Caen, their son was killed by the Germans, for suspected Résistance activity.
- The Daulny family were cobblers and shoe merchants. The father, mother, one young son, an employee, the grandfather, the grandmother and an aunt were buried in the rubble of the house, and when the two sons came back from Germany, where they had been sent to work by the Germans, they found only ruins and wooden crosses in the cemetery.
- M. Claude Beauchef, prisoner of war, on his return found neither his wife, nor his baby, nor his business premises.

In total, 356 people from 118 families were killed in the two bombings.

=== A shower of bombs ===
"I remember, we were at the table eating chips in spite of it being 1:45 according to the German clock. This had become the official time, but, for us it was only a quarter to one, as we were still keeping the old time. A powerful roar of aircraft engines made us rush out into the courtyard, eyes straining into the clear sky of early summer. A wave of about a dozen planes came across from the west. Some objects were falling from the planes. 'They’re dropping leaflets,' said my grandmother. 'No, they’re bombs,' exclaimed my father. We rushed back to the house and into a small passage of two square metres, chosen a long time ago as a shelter because it had very thick walls. We didn’t have a cellar."

"When it stopped, the respite was only for a short time. A second wave came across. We held our breath, but it passed on towards Argentan. A third bombardment followed, just as intense, the terrible noise blotting out the sound of the women praying. We were waiting for a fourth wave, which never arrived. When we emerged from our shelter, our breath still shaking, a cloud of dust smothered the courtyard and all the neighbouring streets."....

"We were unscathed, the house hardly touched, but we were hemmed in by the rubble from the buildings on the main road. Just 50 metres away, some German ammunition lorries, concealed under the shade of the horse chestnuts in the fairground, had also been hit, and were blowing up one after the other. The trees were shredded, with reddened trunks encrusted with bits of metal. They had lost all their leaves and were framing the mangled chassis, carcasses of the German lorries."

See article Strategic bombing during World War II

== Battle of Écouché ==
On 12 August 1944, the 2nd Free French Armored Division of General Leclerc left Alençon. Its objective was to cut off the Granville–Paris trunk road from the German units which were retreating towards the Seine after their setback at failed counter-attack at Mortain.

In the north, as the Canadians were holding Falaise, the German units under artillery and aircraft fire were forced to use the minor roads linking Putanges-Trun-Vimoutiers. This hindered their progress and made it possible to surround them, a situation which became known as the Falaise pocket.

The tactical group Warabiot was given the mission to reach Ecouché via St. Christophe Le Jajolet and Fleuré, with the order going to sub-group Putz to cover Ecouché on the west flank by going through Boucé. In the east, the Americans were given the task of capturing Argentan.

=== Approach, 12 August 1944 ===
At Sées, at 1300 hours, the order was given to push on towards Ecouché. Roger de Normandie, a resistance member and retired officer from Macé, volunteered to lead the Warabiot column. This was penetrate deep into the enemy lines by way of country lanes and the Cance river bed.

At St. Christophe Le Jajolet, the French Sherman tank, Keren, was disabled (3 fatalities) by a German tank, but the others were able to carry on. Reaching Fleuré by the evening, the column destroyed a German convoy retreating towards Ecouché.

=== Capture, 13 August 1944 ===
At sunrise, an advance force, jeeps and half-tracks, followed closely by the tanks of Captain Buis and the motorised convoys, reached the level crossing at Ecouché and made a surprise attack.

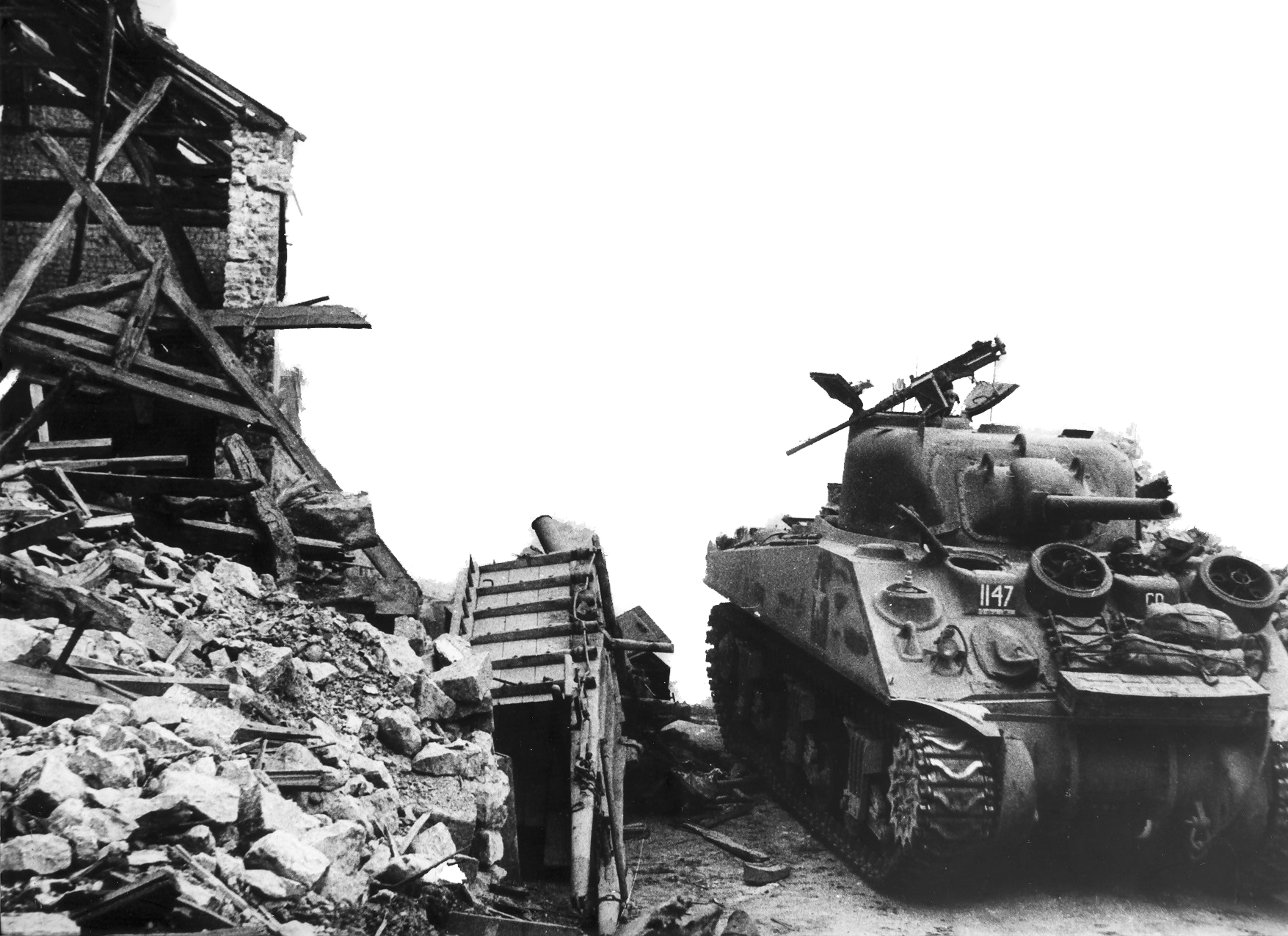
Sherman tank

The 2nd French Armored Division (2nd DB) of General Leclerc entered Ecouché, blocking the German retreat on the main road, the current D924.

In the centre of Écouché surprised a German motorised column which was in the process of retreating towards the north (Mortgaroult). The Germans were trapped in a tremendous bottleneck in the narrow streets of the village. It was a carnage. A rearguard Panther tank delayed the French advance. The shell exchanges came to an end to the advantage of the French, who established a bridgehead on the farside bank, but the Germans remained in command of the heights north of the village for the whole week.

Udon, a village slightly west of Ecouché and defended by the German SS, had to be taken house by house. The French set up their position at the Udon crossroads. Their aim was to resist the pressure of the German troops as they retreated west.

In the east, the Americans were delayed. They had not succeeded in taking Argentan and they needed to hold Meheudin and Fontenai, both small villages between Argentan and Ecouché.

The objective was achieved. The 116 Panzer Division(German tank division) was cut in two and suffered heavy losses compared with the 2nd DB, whose losses in men and equipment were minimized. Colonel Warabiot's command post moved into the presbytery of the "good Abbé Verger".

=== Defense ===
Nevertheless, the position remained fragile. There was only the small Branet detachment which arrived towards mid-day to reinforce them, after some successful exploits in the Boucé area.

The bulk of the Putz troops, held in reserve in the Ecouves forest, was a long time delayed. The French numbered only 130 compared to the enemy, but they had a lot of equipment, which led the Germans into making an error of judgement. Furthermore, the connivance of civilians was relied upon to inflate statistics, should they be interrogated by the Germans.

On 14 August, help came from the sky as the American airforce attacked German positions. The attack hit some of the French units by mistake. Thus, on the western side of town, at "Udon's" crossing, the French tank Bir Hakeim was destroyed along with its crew and four nearby civilians.

In the south, it was only on 17 August that a clearing operation (1 fatality) at Joué du Plain was able to relieve the prolonged pressure caused by an isolated group the SS.In the west, on 18 August, the 5th American armoured division finally arrived from Rânes. In the east, Argentan was finally captured by the 80th American Infantry Division on 20 August.

=== Final liberation ===
Under pressure from the Americans in the south and the British in the west, the German troops threw themselves against the Ecouché stranglehold. Ferocious confrontations pitted German armoured vehicles and infantry against the French position, which had to resist them in order to retain the Udon junction.

From Goulet and Montgaroult in the north, the salvoes of shells from hidden Panther tanks rained down on the Shermans, piercing the armour of some of them - one of them the Massaouah -, and heavily damaging many village houses.

On 16 August, the Germans launched a counter offensive against a group of infantry and tanks. A rain of French shells hindered their progress and an attack by the « Nueve » infantry soon moved into close combat, resulting in casualties on both sides, though the Germans were stopped.

On the afternoon of 17 August, an attack by foot soldiers of the German SS 2nd SS Panzer Division Das Reich on the banks of the Orne became a rout.

At the same time, some other Allied attacks were successful. The most notorious was the one carried out by baroudeurs Campos (Spaniad) and Reiter (German anti-nazi) who with some daring men and FFI, infiltrated German lines as far as the Mesnil Glaise castle. There, they wiped out the SS garrison, capturing 129 rather compliant German prisoners, 60 of them injured, and liberating 8 American prisoners.

On 20 August, the battle was over for the 2nd DB. They were able to attend to their wounded, replenish their numbers and wait for the order to liberate Paris.
