= Transmitter Le Mans-Mayet =

Radio and TV transmitter site in France

Coordinates: 47°45′53″N 0°19′24″E

The transmitter Le Mans-Mayet is a 342-metre-high guyed mast for TV- and FM-radio transmission near Le Mans, France at 0°19'E and 47°45'N. This guyed mast, built in 1993, is one of the tallest constructions of France, taller than Eiffel Tower.

== See also ==
- Mayet
- List of masts
