= Régiment de marche du Tchad =

Ad hoc Regiment of Chad
- Régiment de marche du Tchad
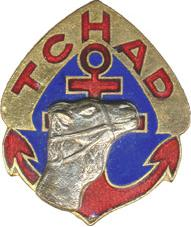
- Regimental insigne
- Active: 1943 – Present
- Country: France
- Branch: Marine Troops; French Army
- Type: Regiment
- Size: 1200
- Part of: 2nd Armoured Brigade.
- Garrison/HQ: Quartier Colonel Dio, Meyenheim
- Colors: Red and blue
- Anniversaries: 1 September (Battle of Bazeilles)
- Engagements: Koufra (1941), Fezzan (1942), Sud-Tunisien (1943), Alençon (1944), Paris (1944), Strasbourg (1944).

Commanders
- Current commander: Colonel de Cevins

Insignia
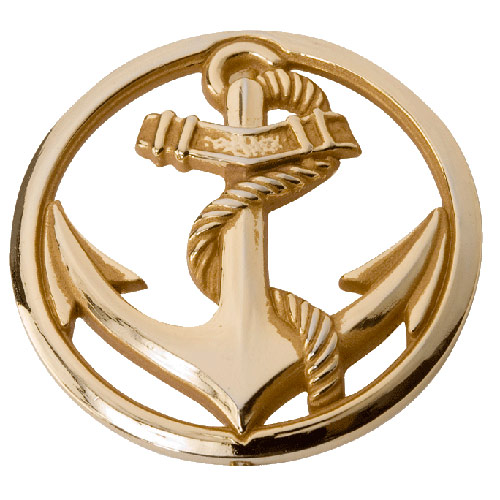
- Beret badge of the Troupes de Marine
- Abbreviation: RMT

The Régiment de marche du Tchad (RMT, "Ad hoc Regiment of Chad") is a mechanised unit of the French Army, belonging to the Troupes de Marine. It is part of the 2nd Armoured Brigade. Formerly garrisoned north of Noyon it was moved in July 2010 to Quartier Colonel Dio, Meyenheim, Alsace.

== History ==
The Régiment de marche du Tchad was formed in July 1943. It became the infantry regiment of the 2nd Armoured Division.

The RMT was formed grouping personnel from mainland France belonging to the Régiment de Tirailleurs Sénégalais du Tchad, as well as other elements from mainland France or from Europe who had joined the Allies in North Africa. For instance, its 9th company, commanded by Captain Raymond Dronne, had the Spanish nickname La Nueve because it was mainly formed with veterans from the Republican side of the Spanish Civil War. The 9th Company was actually formed in Chad (1941), before the regiment as a whole.

=== Liberation of Paris ===
On August 20, 1944 General Charles De Gaulle received information that a great civilian revolt against the Germans had broken out in Paris. He asked the Allied Supreme Command to send French troops to liberate the capital. Upon being instructed to advance on Paris with the 2nd Division, Leclerc ordered the 9th Armoured Company to march onto Paris as an advance party.

At 21:22 hours the night of August 24, 1944, La Nueve burst into the centre of Paris via the Porte d'Italie. On entering the Town Hall Square, a 9th Company tank, "Ebro", fired the first shots against a large group of German artillery and machine guns. Later, the commander of the 9th Company, Raymond Dronne, demanded unconditional surrender from the German commander, Dietrich von Choltitz.

While awaiting the final capitulation, the 9th Company assaulted the Chamber of Deputies, the Hotel Majestic and the Place de la Concorde, suffering just one casualty. At 3:30pm on August 25, the German garrison of Paris surrendered to 9th Company soldiers, who took von Choltitz as a prisoner, while other 2nd Division units began to arrive at the French capital.

The next day, August 26, Allied troops entered Paris in triumph; the 2nd Division marched past Notre Dame de Paris and escorted De Gaulle along the Champs Elysees. The 9th Armoured Company marched under the colours of the Second Spanish Republic.

The Régiment de marche du Tchad is often associated with the pledge made by Leclerc, then a colonel, never to cease fighting before French colours were flying over the cathedral of Strasbourg. It took part in the Liberation of Alençon, and most famously in the Liberation of Paris, being one of the first units to enter the city when the ninth company escorted a tank platoon of the 501e RCC (501e régiment de chars de combat). It later took part in the Liberation of Strasbourg, in November 1944.

The 9th Company distinguished itself in battles in France and Germany and was among the first allied units to reach the Kehlsteinhaus (Hitler's "Eagle's Nest") in the German Alps (1945).

=== Post-war ===
Elements of the Régiment de marche were among International Security Assistance Force (ISAF) troops ambushed in the Uzbin Valley, Afghanistan in 2008; one of the ten soldiers killed was from the RMT.

== Organization ==
The regiment is composed of around 1200 personnel, both military and civilian. Organized into 9 companies.

- Compagnie de commandement et logistique (CCL) – command and logistics company
- Compagnie d'éclairage et d'appui (CEA) – recce and support company
- 1er Compagnie de combat mécanisées – 1st combat company
- 2e Compagnie de combat mécanisées – 2nd combat company
- 3e Compagnie de combat mécanisées – 3rd combat company
- 4e Compagnie de combat mécanisées – 4th combat company
- Compagnie de base d'instruction (CBI) – training & base company
- Compagnie de réservistes – reserve company
- Compagnie de réservistes – reserve company

== Honours ==
Because of the circumstances of its formation, the RMT inherited the honours of the Régiment de Tirailleurs Sénégalais du Tchad; hence, its flag is inscribed with the names of three battles in which its parent took part: Koufra (1941), Fezzan (1942), and Sud-Tunisien (1943). The three other names are those of battles in which the RMT itself took part as such: Alençon (1944), Paris (1944), and Strasbourg (1944).

The RMT was awarded the Ordre de la Libération ("Order of the Liberation") on 12 June 1945, and the Croix de Guerre 1939–1945 with 4 palms; it also sports the Presidential Unit Citation (USA) awarded to the entire 2nd Armoured Division. Consequently, its men wear the fourragère of the Médaille militaire with an "olive" representing the Croix de guerre 1939–1945, and the fourragère of the Ordre de la Libération, since 18 June 1996.

Because the patron saint of the Troupes de Marine is God Himself, all internal ceremonies of the RMT are concluded by the line "Et au Nom de Dieu, vive la coloniale !" ("and in the name of God, long live the Colonials"). It was first uttered by Charles de Foucauld when he saw colonial troops arrive to his rescue when, as a missionary, he found himself in trouble with local tribes.

== Flag of the regiment ==

Its cravat is decorated:

It is a Companion of the Liberation since June 12, 1945 and is also decorated with the Croix de Guerre 1939–1945 with four Palms. The Presidential Unit Citation was awarded to the U.S. 2nd Armoured Division, which it was a part of. It is also entitled to use the fourragère in the colors of the Médaille militaire ribbon with the "olive" of the Croix de Guerre (1939–1945) and since 18 June 1996 to include a fourragère in the colors of the ribbon of the Cross of the Ordre de la Libération. See the list of companions of the Liberation.

=== Decorations ===
- Cross of the Liberation.
- Presidential Unit Citation.
- Croix de guerre 1939–1945 four palms.
