= Raymond Dronne =

French civil servant (1908–1991)

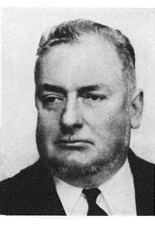
- Raymond Dronne in the 1950's

Member of the National Assembly
- In office June 30, 1968 – April 2, 1978
- Constituency: Sarthe

Member of the National Assembly
- In office June 17, 1951 – October 9, 1962
- Constituency: Sarthe

Personal details
- Born: March 8, 1908 Mayet, France
- Died: September 5, 1991 (aged 83) Paris, France
- Party: Rally of the French People (1951–1955); Republicains Sociaux (1956–1958); Union pour la nouvelle Republique (1958–1962); Progrès et Démocratie Moderne (1968–1973); Reformateurs Democrates Sociaux (1973–1978)

Military service
- Allegiance: Free France; French Fourth Republic
- Commands: La Nueve
- Battles/wars: World War II; Tunisian campaign; Liberation of Paris; First Indochina War

Capitaine Raymond Dronne (8 March 1908, in Mayet, France – 5 September 1991, in Paris) was a French civil servant, soldier, and, following World War II, a politician. He was the second Allied officer to enter Paris as part of the liberation forces during World War II. Following the war he was elected to the National Assembly of the Fourth and Fifth Republics to represent Sarthe.

== Biography ==
Dronne was born on March 8, 1908, in Mayet.

During World War II, Dronne was a volunteer who joined the Free French Forces in Cameroon in 1940. He would fight across North Africa under Philippe Leclerc for the Free French, even being injured while fighting in Tunisia.

Later, Dronne was assigned as commanding officer of the 9e Compagnie, Régiment de Marche du Tchad (Ninth Company, Regiment of March of Chad), known as "La Nueve" as it was mainly composed of Spanish republicans. He spoke only a little Spanish and claimed other officers were fearful of taking command of the largely Spanish unit. The 9th Company was a unit of the 3rd battalion RMT, part of the French 2nd Armored Division.

During the Liberation of Paris, due to combat conditions and poor road progress, General Leclerc, commanding general of the Second Armored, ordered Dronne to form an advance party, go to Paris and let the Resistance know that the Second Armored would be in Paris in 24 hours. His advance party, the 9th Company, consisted of 15 half tracks (M5s and M5A1s), and three Sherman tanks from 501 RCC of the division, plus engineer units. The H/Ts included those called Les Cossaques, Guadalajara, Madrid and Ebro and the added Sherman tanks were called Montmirail, Romilly and Champaubert. This advance would place him as the first of Leclerc's tanks to reach Paris on 24 August 1944.

=== Post-WWII ===
After the War, Dronne would fight in Indochina. He would take command of a Muslim unit from Chad. He would bemoan the loss of French Indochina as the mark of the downfall of a civilization while campaigning in French Algeria and noting the civility in Asia that Africa lacked. Ultimately Dronne retired from the military in the late 40's.

Dronne served as a representative of Sarthe in the National Assembly from June 17, 1951, to December 1, 1955, with the Rally of the French People and from January 2, 1956, to December 8, 1958, with the Republicains Sociaux. He would eventually be challenged by the U.N.R. party for his lack of loyalty to the party, and would eventually be excluded from them while he claimed to have not moved politically from original Gaullist doctrine. He would continue holding the position but with different parties, serving from November 30, 1958, to October 9, 1962, with Union pour la nouvelle Republique; from June 30, 1968, to April 1, 1973, with the Progrès et Démocratie Moderne; and from April 2, 1973, to April 2, 1978, with Reformateurs Democrates Sociaux.

Dronne would also serve Overseas France, taking up control of the OAS in Oran. He would deny criminal culpability for the 148 deaths and 435 injuries his sector of the OAS was accused of perpetrating.

Dronne died on September 5, 1991.
