= The Rochambelles =

French military unit of female ambulance drivers during World War II

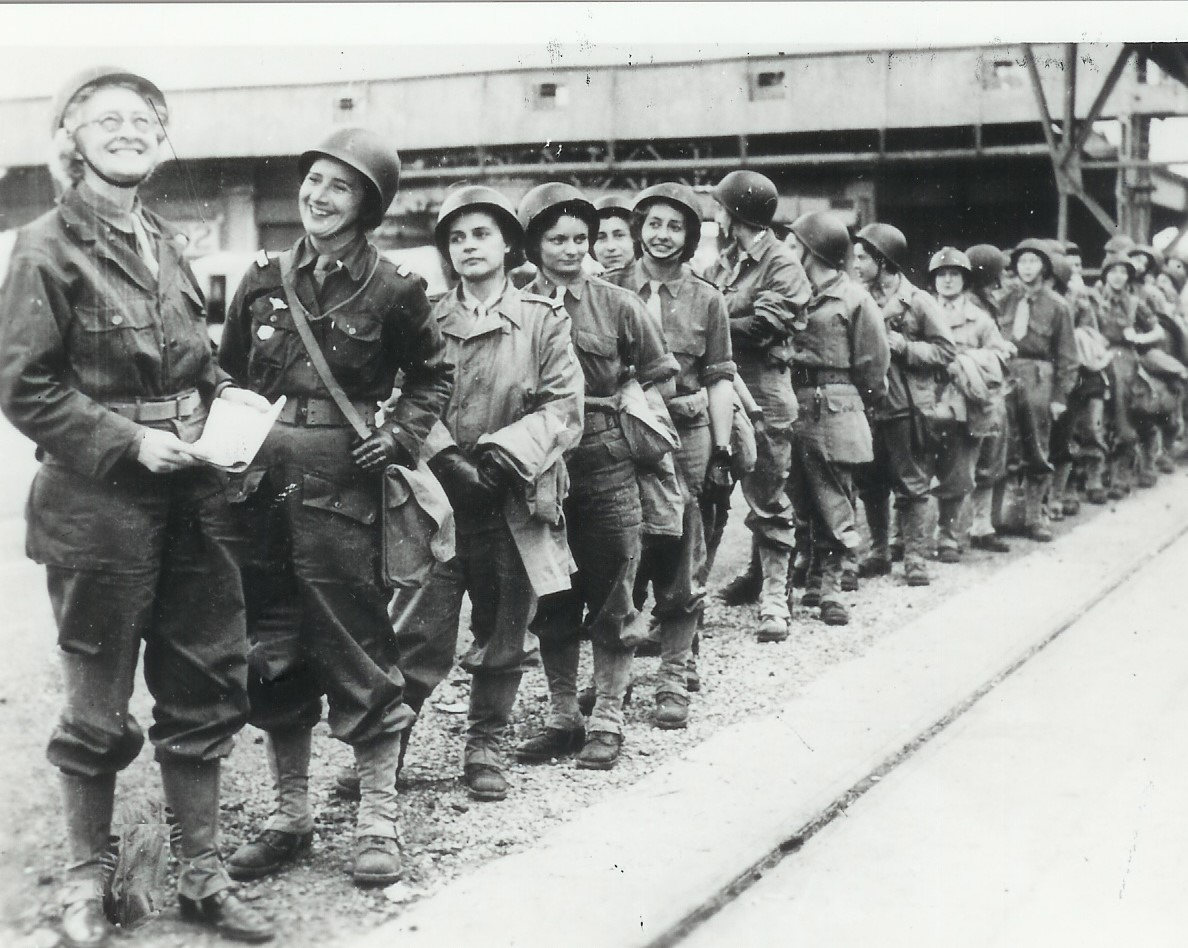
Florence Conrad, Suzanne Torrès and the Rochambelles on the quay at Southampton, ready to cross into France, July 30, 1944. Photo courtesy of the Musée de la Libération.

The Rochambelles were the first women’s unit integrated into an armored division on the western front during World War II. A total of 51 women served in the First Company, 13th medical battalion of the French Second Armored Division from 1943 to 1945, and then some members continued on to Indochina.

== Organization ==
In 1941, Florence Conrad, a wealthy American widow who had lived in France for many years, returned to New York. She had driven an ambulance during the 1940 Battle of France, and afterwards transported supplies to prisoner-of-war camps. She believed that an all-women’s ambulance corps would free men for fighting. She began raising money and looking for drivers, eventually buying 19 Dodge WC54 ambulances.

She and her lieutenant, Suzanne Torrès, recruited a dozen women, most of them French, who had been shut out of their country by the Nazi Occupation. They learned basic auto mechanics at the old World’s Fair grounds in Flushing, Queens, took army-run first-aid courses, and volunteered at New York hospitals to increase their medical skills. As the name Lafayette had been taken by the volunteer pilots of WWI, they named themselves the Rochambeau Group after the revolutionary-era general.

Accepted by the Free French Army, they sailed to Morocco, where another 22 French women joined. Florence Conrad managed to get the ambulance unit integrated as part of the Second Armored Division, led by General Philippe Leclerc de Hauteclocque. After further training in Algeria, the division men nicknamed the ambulance drivers “Rochambelles,” a name that has stuck ever since. When they were set to sail to England in May 1944, American transporters refused to let them to board: no women allowed. General Leclerc stepped in: “They’re not women, they’re ambulance drivers!”

== Into the War ==
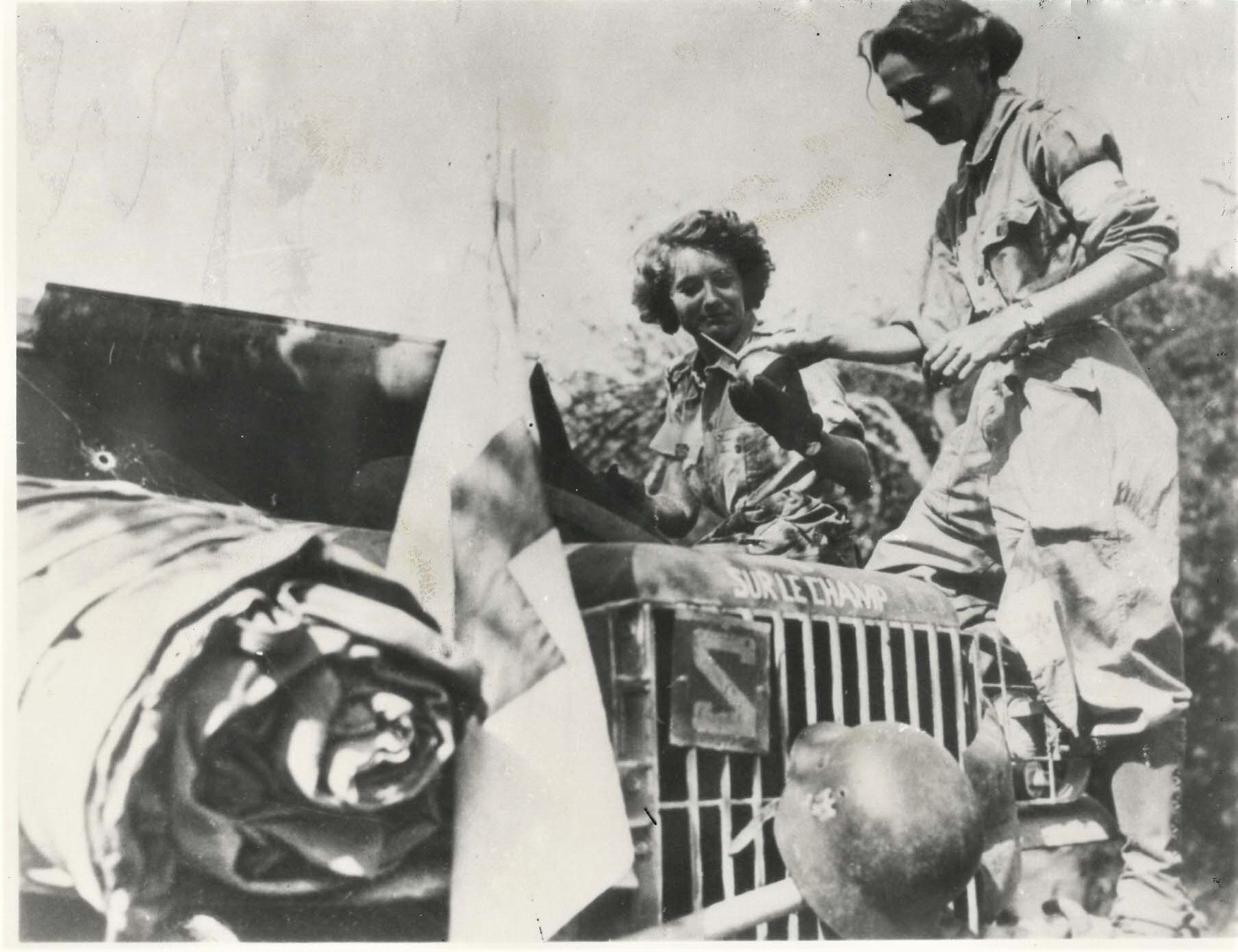
Anne-Marie Davion (l) and Anne Hastings work on their ambulance in Normandy, August 1944. Photo courtesy Musée de la Libération.

The Second Armored Division, including its ambulance drivers, crossed the Channel on August 1, 1944, joining General George S. Patton’s Third Army for the ongoing Battle of Normandy. While not combatants, Rochambelles were bombed, shot at and taken prisoner, and one disappeared forever. They learned to overcome their fear, and their performance was such that by the time they got to Paris, where General Leclerc had expected to recruit male drivers, he called them to assemble and announced they had earned their place in the division. "You have carried out [your mission] with such brio and devotion, winning the admiration of your commanders and all in your unit, that I will keep you," he said.

From September 1944 through February 1945, the Rochambelles picked up wounded soldiers in the rain and mud of Lorraine and through the bitter winter in Alsace, enduring the same combat conditions as the soldiers. The division was sent to rest and recuperate in the Loire Valley in March, then called back to action in mid-April as the Allied armies traversed Germany. One Rochambelle died in a Jeep accident near Berchtesgaden.

Postwar, many of the Rochambelles said they had difficulty re-adjusting to civilian life, but found solace in strong and enduring friendships with their fellow veterans. All the women received the Military Medal for service and most also were awarded the prestigious Croix de Guerre.

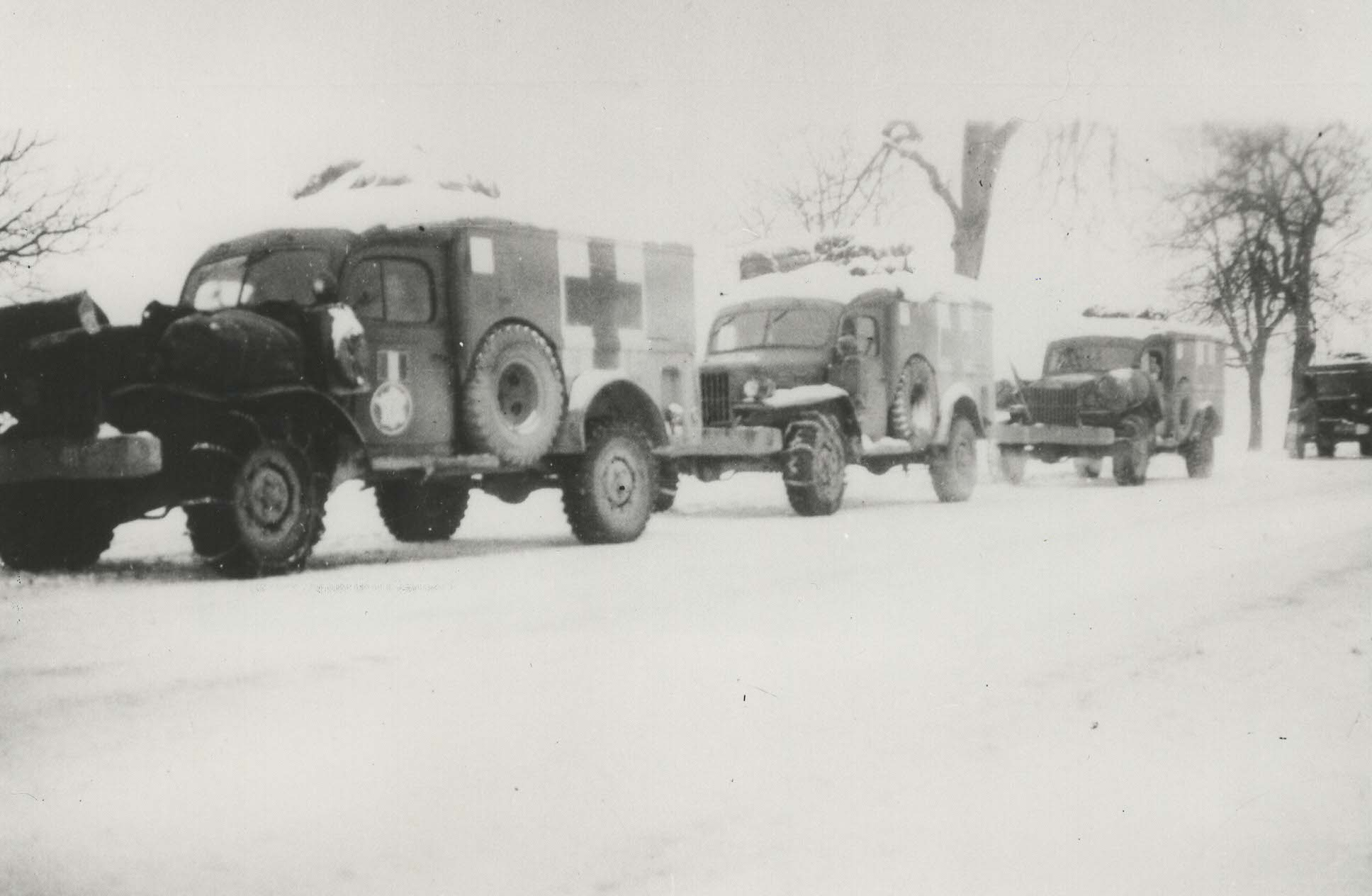
Ambulances in the snow in Alsace, January 1945. Photo courtesy of Musée de la Libération.

== Bibliography ==
- Bervialle, Zizon, Au Volant de Madeleine-Bastille, Paris: Caravane, 1975.
- Conrad, Florence, Camarades de Combat, New York: Brentano’s, 1942.
- Fournier, Jacqueline, Souvenirs d’une ambulancière de la 2e DB, Paris: unpublished, 1993.
- Hampton, Ellen, Women of Valor: the Rochambelles on the WWII Front, Jefferson, N.C.: McFarland Publishing, 2021.
- Massu, Suzanne, Quand j’étais Rochambelle, Paris: Editions Bernard Grasset, 1969, 2000.
- Vézy, Edith, “Gargamelle,” mon ambulance guerrière 2e DB, Paris: Editions L’Harmattan, 1994.
