= Place Pinel =

Square in Paris, France

- Public square
- {{{other_names}}}
- Former names: Place de la Barrière-d'Ivry (until 26 February 1867), place des Deux-Moulins
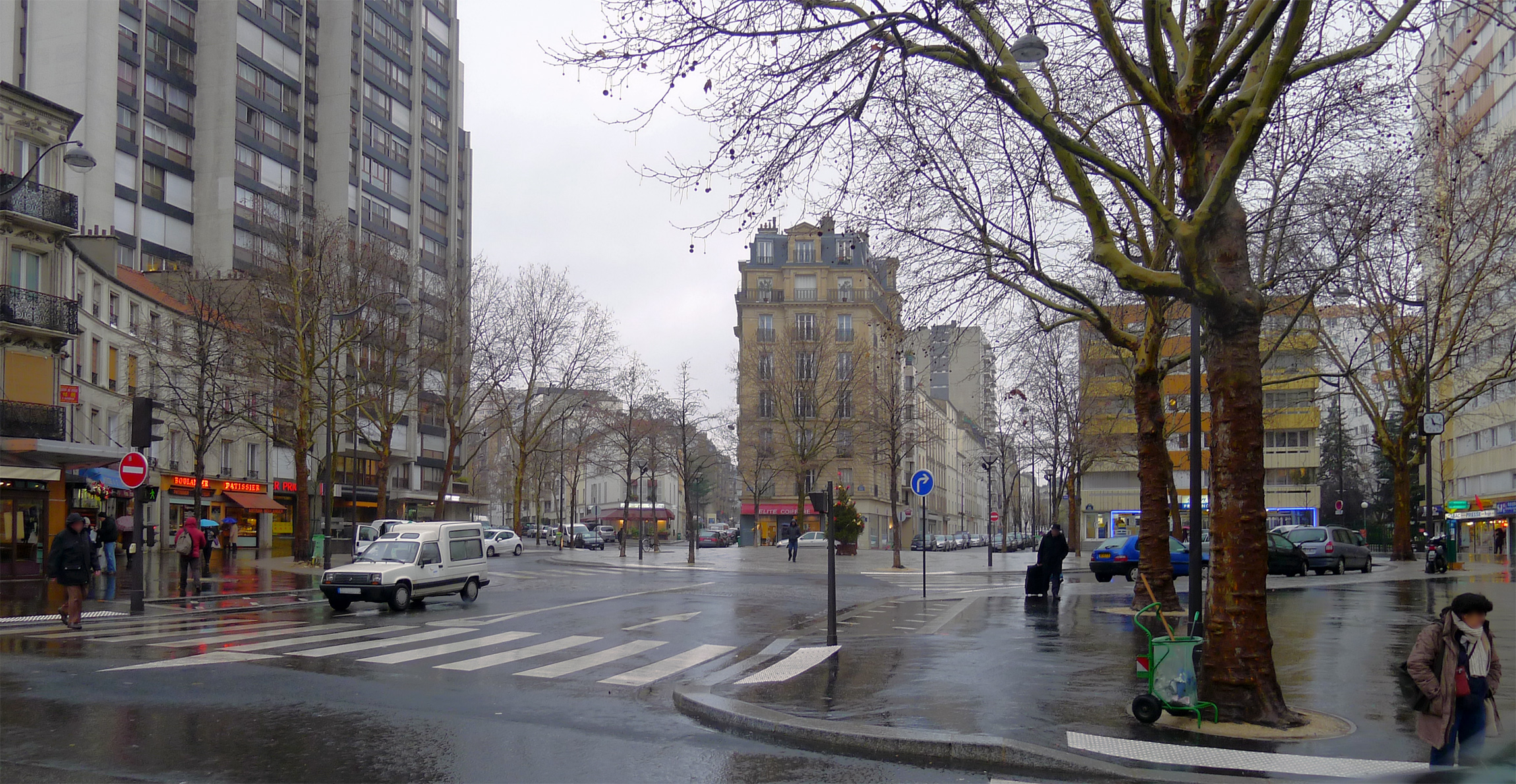
- Constructed: 11 June 1867
- Area: 64.6 m (70.6 yd) diameter
- Surface: Granite paving
- Location: Quartier de la Salpêtrière; 13th arrondissement
- Address: 7449 Paris, France
- Location in Paris
- Coordinates: 48.8333718°N 2.3615406°E

The Place Pinel (English: Pinel Square) is a square and street in the 13th arrondissement of Paris.

== History ==
Created about 1823 as the Place de la Barrière-d’Ivry, as it was located just inside the Barrière-d’Ivry, a gate in the Wall of the Farmers-General, where taxes were collected on goods brought into the city. (Because the Barrière d’Ivry was sometimes called the Barrière des Deux Moulins, the Place was sometimes called the Place des Deux Moulins.) In 1867, the Place was renamed for the psychiatrist Philippe Pinel (1745 – 1826), "benefactor of strangers", because of its proximity to the Hôpital de la Salpêtrière where he worked.

In 2012, the square was completely redeveloped by the Direction de la Voirie et des Déplacements de la Mairie de Paris, the City of Paris transport section. At this time, the central circle was recovered in granite paving. Its design represents a pine cone, represented with logarithmic spirals based on Fibonacci numbers. These spirals emphasise the proportions of the square's rotunda.

== See also ==
- Squares in Paris
