= Mayet, Sarthe =

Mayet
- Commune
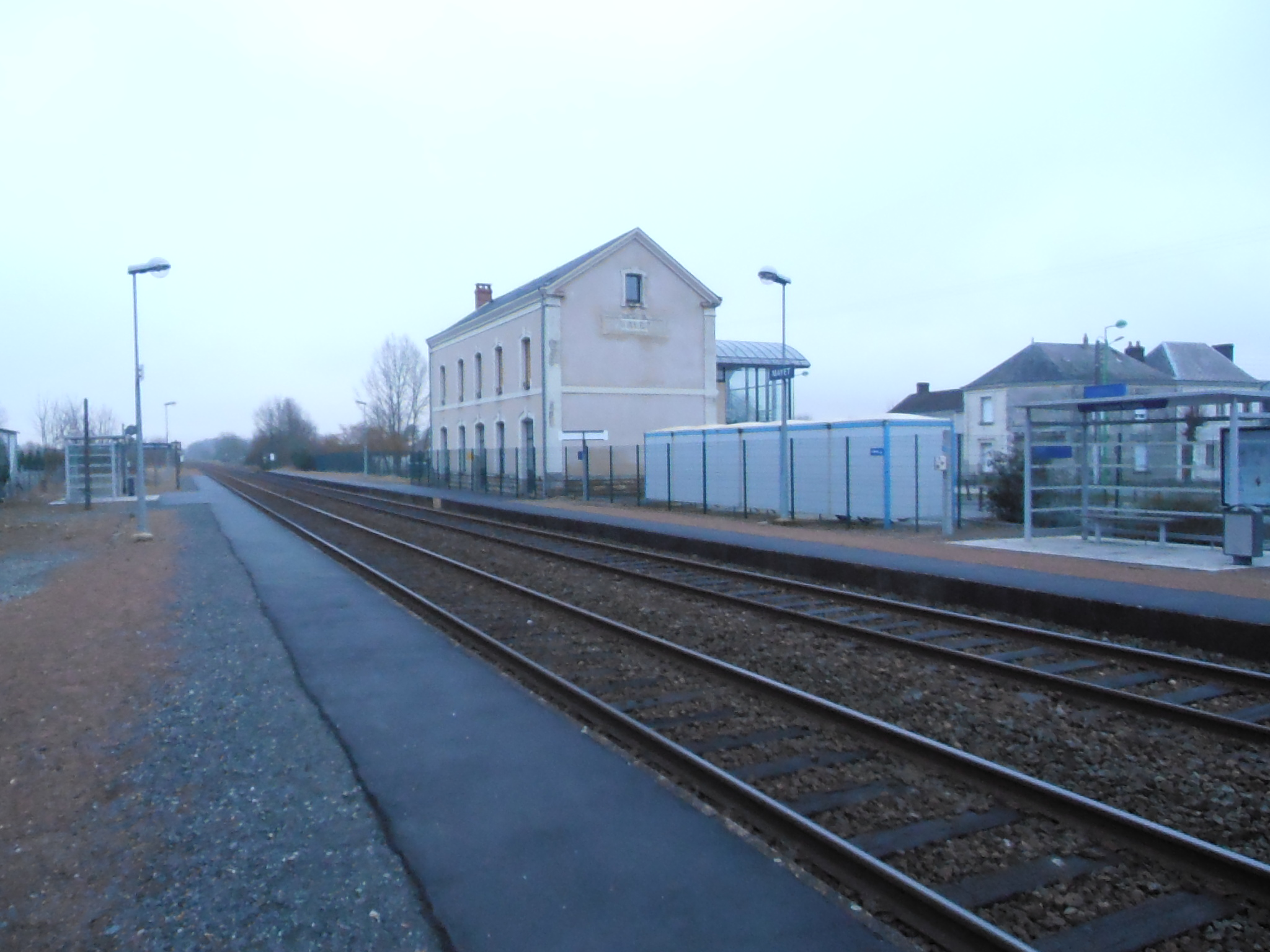
- Mayet railway station

- Coat of arms
- Location of Mayet
- Location within France Location within Pays de la Loire
- Coordinates: 47°45′35″N 0°16′33″E
- Country: France
- Region: Pays de la Loire
- Department: Sarthe
- Arrondissement: La Flèche
- Canton: Le Lude
- Intercommunality: Sud Sarthe

Government
  - Mayor (2020–2026): Pierre Ouvrard
- Area^{1}: 53.96 km^{2} (20.83 sq mi)
- Highest elevation: 164 m (538 ft)
- Lowest elevation: 50 m (160 ft)
- Population (2023): 3,187
  - Density: 59.06/km^{2} (153.0/sq mi)
- Demonym(s): Mayetais, Mayetaise
- Time zone: UTC+01:00 (CET)
  - Summer (DST): UTC+02:00 (CEST)
- INSEE/Postal code: 72191 /72360
- ^{1} French Land Register data, which excludes lakes, ponds, glaciers > 1 km^{2} (0.386 sq mi or 247 acres) and river estuaries.

Mayet (French pronunciation: [majɛ]) is a commune in the Sarthe department in the region of Pays de la Loire in north-western France.

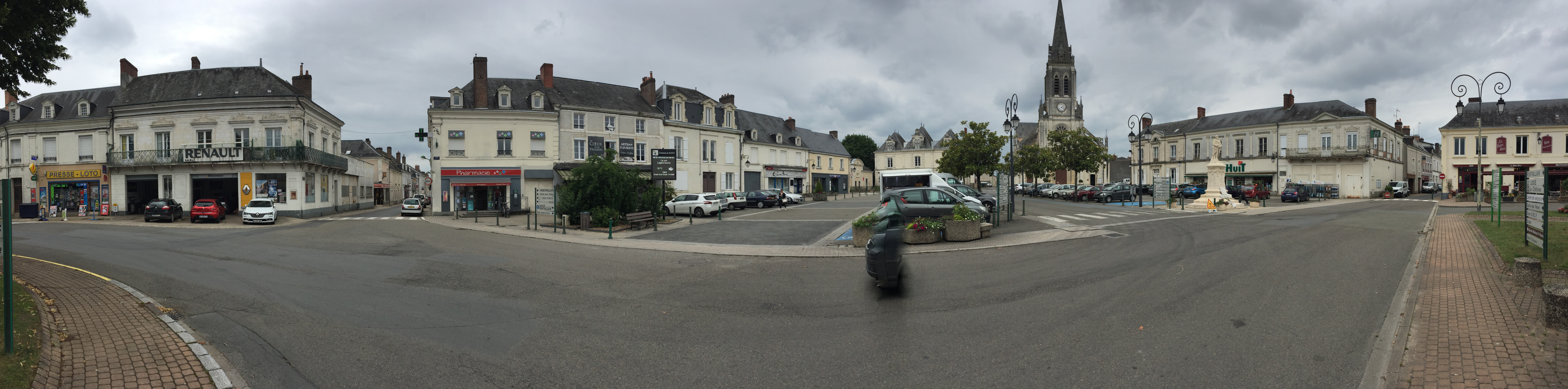
Panoramic view of Mayet Town Square, west is to the left running round to east on the right.

== Population ==
Historical population
Year	Pop.	±% p.a.
1968	3,253	—
1975	3,019	−1.06%
1982	2,876	−0.69%
1990	2,877	+0.00%
1999	2,915	+0.15%
2007	3,187	+1.12%
2012	3,210	+0.14%
2017	3,138	−0.45%
2023	3,187	+0.26%
Source: INSEE

== See also ==
- Transmitter Le Mans-Mayet
- Communes of the Sarthe department
