= 2nd Armoured Brigade (France) =

Armoured brigade of the French Army

- 2^{e} Brigade Blindée
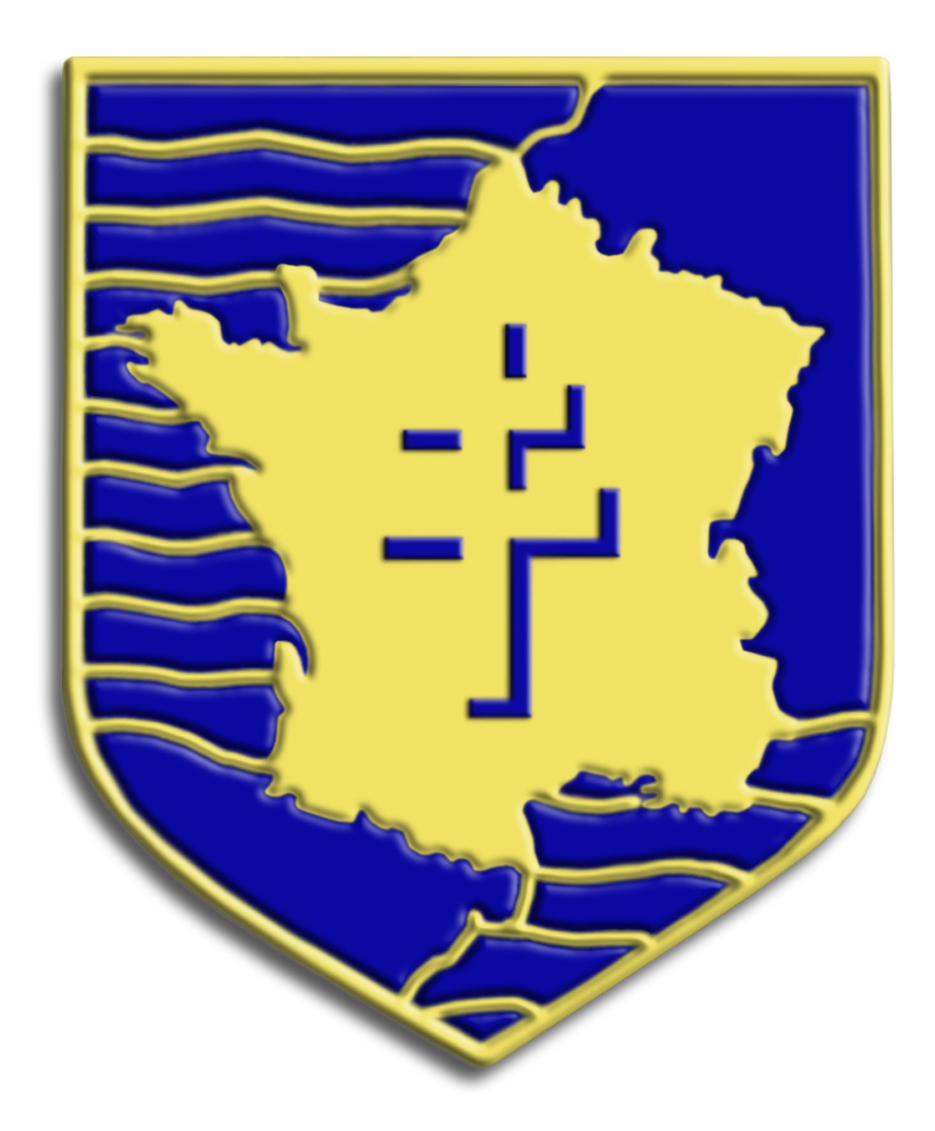
- Badge of the 2nd BB
- Active: c. 1970, 1999–present
- Country: France
- Branch: French Army
- Type: Armour
- Size: 7200 personnel
- Part of: 3rd Division
- Garrison/HQ: Strasbourg
- Motto: Ne me dites pas que c'est impossible ! ("Do not tell me it is impossible!")

Commanders
- Current commander: General de brigade Vincent Giraud (July 2020 onwards)
- Notable commanders: Général Leclerc

The 2nd Armoured Brigade (French: 2^{e} Brigade Blindée, 2^{e} BB) is an armoured brigade of the French Army. It is heir to the honours and traditions of the 2nd Armoured Division famously commanded by Philippe Leclerc de Hauteclocque.

In 1970 the 2nd Armoured Brigade at Saint-Germain-en-Laye was part of the 8th Armoured Division, headquartered at Compiègne, alongside two mechanised brigades. In 1977 the 2nd Armoured Brigade appears to have been disbanded, and the 2nd Armoured Division reformed.

The reorganisation of the French Army in 1999 transformed and downsized the 2nd Armoured Division to the 2nd Armoured Brigade.

From 1999 to 2010 the brigade headquarters was located in the quartier Bellecombe in Orléans.

From July 2010 the brigade headquarters was located in Illkirch-Graffenstaden, neighbouring Strasbourg, at the quartier Leclerc (near the 2e Compagnie de Commandement et de Transmissions and the 291st Jäger Bataillon). The general commanding the brigade is at the same time the Military Governor of Strasbourg. He loges in the fr:Palais du Gouverneur militaire de Strasbourg situated in the place Broglie in Strasbourg. Since 2023, the headquarters is also located in Strasbourg.

== Structure 2026 ==
- 2^{e} Compagnie de Commandement et de Transmissions Blindée (2^{e} CCTB) – Armoured Command and Signals Company in Illkirch-Graffenstaden with Véhicule de l'Avant Blindé (VAB)
- 12^{e} Régiment de Cuirassiers (12^{e} RC) – Armoured Regiment in Olivet with 60 Leclerc main battle tanks
- 501e Régiment de chars de combat (501^{e} RCC) – Armoured Regiment in Mourmelon-le-Grand with 60 Leclerc
- Régiment de Marche du Tchad (RMT) – Marine Infantry Regiment in Meyenheim with VBCI
- 16^{e} Bataillon de Chasseurs (16^{e} BC) – Infantry Battalion in Bitche with VBCI
- 92^{e} Régiment d'Infanterie (92^{e} RI) – Infantry Regiment in Clermont-Ferrand with VBCI
- 40^{e} Régiment d'Artillerie (40^{e} RA) Self-propelled Howitzer Regiment in Suippes with 32 GCT 155mm and 12 120mm mortars
- 13^{e} Régiment du Génie (13^{e} RG) – Engineer Regiment in Valdahon
- 12^{e} Groupement d'Instruction (12^{e} GI) - Instruction Groupe in Bitche
- 5^{e} Régiment de Cuirassiers (5^{e} RC) - Armoured Regiment, in Abu Dhabi (United Arab Emirates)
