= 2nd Armored Division (France) =

Formation of the French Army (1943–1999)

- 2e Division Blindée
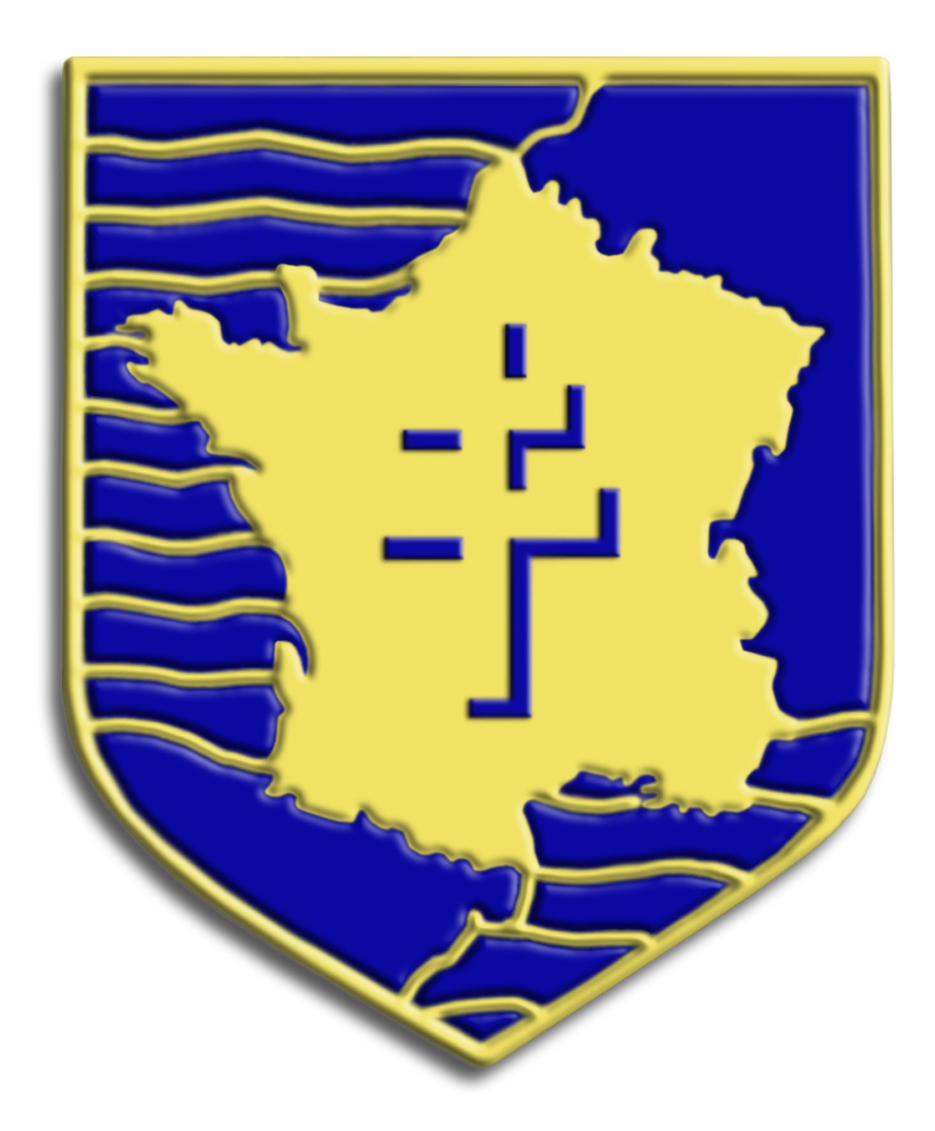
- Original badge of the 2nd Armored Division. The divisional badge features the Cross of Lorraine
- Active: 24 August 1943 – 31 March 1946; 1977–1999
- Country: France
- Branch: French Army, ex-Free French
- Type: Armored division, later 2nd Armored Brigade
- Engagements: Invasion of Normandy; Liberation of Paris; Battle of Dompaire; Liberation of Strasbourg; Colmar Pocket; Royan pocket; Western Allied invasion of Germany

Commanders
- Notable commanders: Philippe Leclerc

The French 2nd Armored Division (French: 2e Division Blindée, 2e DB), commanded by General Philippe Leclerc, fought during the final phases of World War II in the Western Front for the liberation of France. The division was formed around a core of units that had fought in the North African campaign, and re-organised into a light armoured division in 1943. The division embarked in April 1944 and shipped to various ports in Britain. On 29 July 1944, bound for France, the division embarked at Southampton. During combat in 1944, the division liberated Paris, defeated a Panzer brigade during the armoured clashes in Lorraine, forced the Saverne Gap and liberated Strasbourg. After taking part in the Battle of the Colmar Pocket, the division was moved west and assaulted the German-held Atlantic port of Royan, before recrossing France in April 1945 and participating in the final fighting in southern Germany, even going first into Hitler's "Eagle's Nest" (Americans captured the town below). Deactivated after the war, the 2nd Division was again activated in the 1970s and served through 1999, when it was downsized to the now 2nd Armored Brigade.

== Composition ==
The division was formed around a core of units that had raided Italian Libya at the end of 1940 and Tripoli in 1943 under Leclerc, but was most known for its role in the fight at Kufra in 1941 - these units were previously known collectively as the Colonne Leclerc after him. Later renamed the 2nd Light Division, in August 1943, it adopted the same organizational structure as a US light armoured division.

The division's 14,454 personnel included men from the 2nd Light Division, which included escapees from metropolitan France, as well as 3,600 Moroccans and Algerians and about 350 Spanish Republicans. Other sources give about 2,000, official records of the 2e DB show fewer than 300 Spaniards as many hid their nationality, fearing retaliation against their families in Spain.

== World War II operations ==
=== Order of battle ===
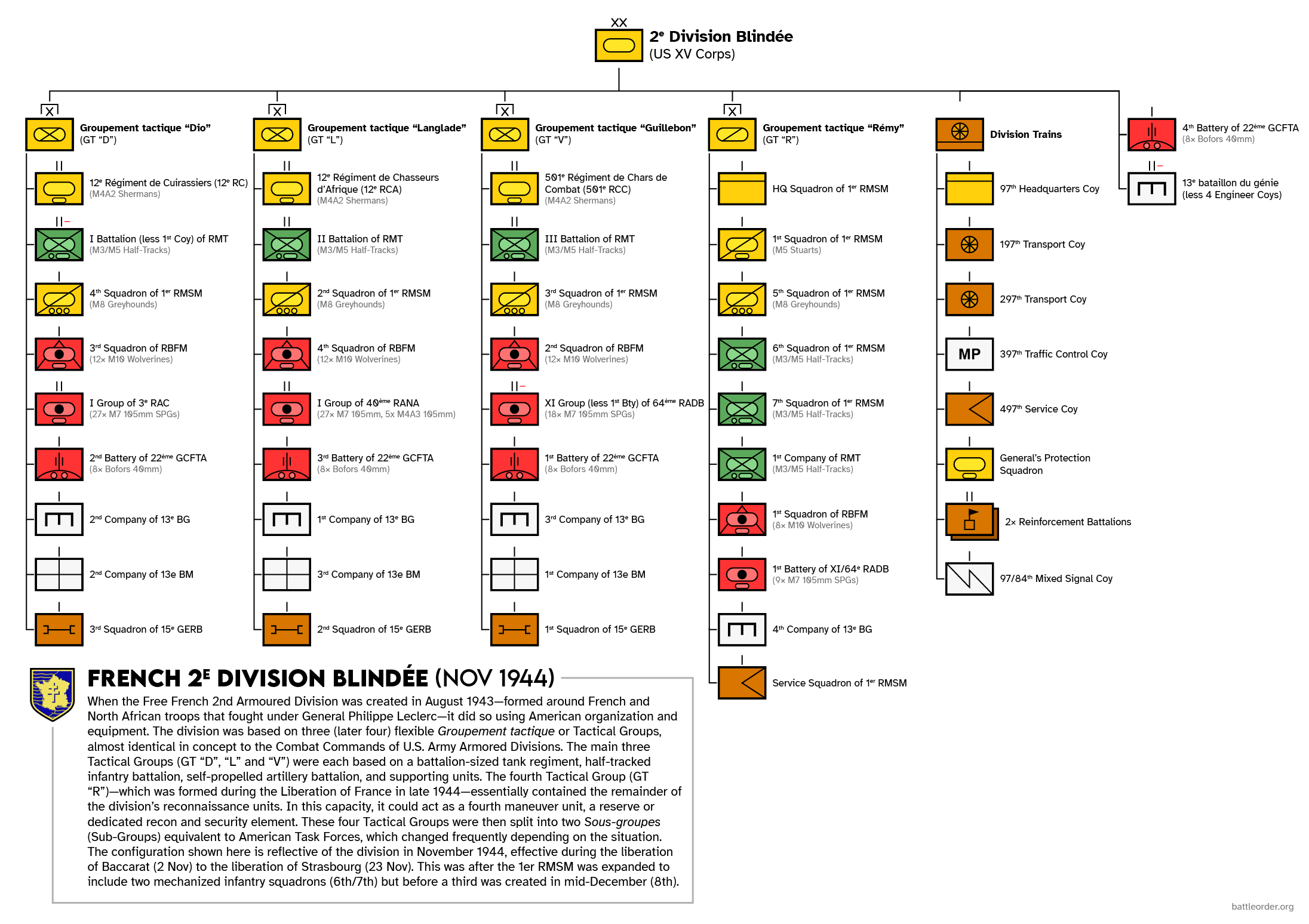
The division's task organisation in November 1944 during the Lorraine campaign.

Combat formations:

- 1^{er} Régiment de Marche de Spahis Marocains (M3 Stuart reconnaissance battalion)
- 12^{e} Régiment de Chasseurs d’Afrique (M4 Sherman tank battalion)
- 12^{e} Régiment de Cuirassiers (M4 Sherman tank battalion)
- 501^{e} Régiment de Chars de Combat (M4 Sherman tank battalion)
- Régiment de marche du Tchad (M3 half-track mechanised infantry)
  - 1^{er} Bataillon du Régiment de Marche du Tchad
  - 2^{e} Bataillon du Régiment de Marche du Tchad
  - 3^{e} Bataillon du Régiment de Marche du Tchad
- Régiment Blindé de Fusiliers-Marins (M10 Wolverine tank destroyer battalion)
- I/3^{e} Régiment d'Artillerie Coloniale (M7 Priest self-propelled artillery battalion)
- I/40^{e} Régiment d'Artillerie Nord Africain (M7 Priest self-propelled artillery battalion)
- IV/64^{e} Régiment d'Artillerie (M8 self-propelled artillery battalion)
- 22^{e} Groupe Colonial de F.T.A (Anti-aircraft battalion)
- 13^{e} Bataillon du Génie (13th Engineer Battalion)
- 97/84^{e} Compagnie de Transmissions (97/84th Signal Company)

Supply and services:

- 97^{e} Compagnie de Quartier Général (97th Headquarters Company)
- 197^{e} Compagnie de Transport (197th Transport Company)
- 297^{e} Compagnie de Transport (207th Transport Company)
- 397^{e} Compagnie de Circulation Routière (397th Movement Control Company)
- 497^{e} Compagnie de Services (497th Services Company)
- 15^{e} Groupe d'Escadrons de Réparations (15th Repair Squadrons Group)
- 13e Bataillon Médical (13th Medical Battalion)
  - 1^{er} Compagnie Médicale et Groupe d'Ambulancières "Rochambeau" (1st Medical Company and Ambulance Drivers Group "Rochambeau")
  - 2^{e} Compagnie Médicale et Groupe d'Ambulancières de la Marine (2nd Medical Company and Marine Troops Ambulance Drivers)
  - 3^{e} Compagnie Médicale et groupe de volontaires Anglais (1st Medical Company and English Volunteers Group)

=== Falaise Pocket ===
The division landed at Utah Beach in Normandy on 1 August 1944, about two months after the D-Day landings, and served under General Patton as part of Third Army. The division played a critical role in the battle of the Argentan-Falaise Pocket (12–21 August), the Allied break-out from Normandy, when it served as a link between American and Canadian armies and made rapid progress against German forces. They all but destroyed the 9th Panzer Division and defeated several other German units. During the Battle for Normandy, the 2nd Division lost 133 men killed, 648 wounded, and 85 missing. Division material losses included 76 armoured vehicles, 7 cannons, 27 halftracks, and 133 other vehicles. In the same period, the 2nd Division inflicted losses on the Germans of 4,500 killed and 8,800 taken prisoner, while the Germans' material losses in combat against the 2nd Division during the same period were 117 tanks, 79 cannons, and 750 wheeled vehicles.

=== Liberation of Paris ===
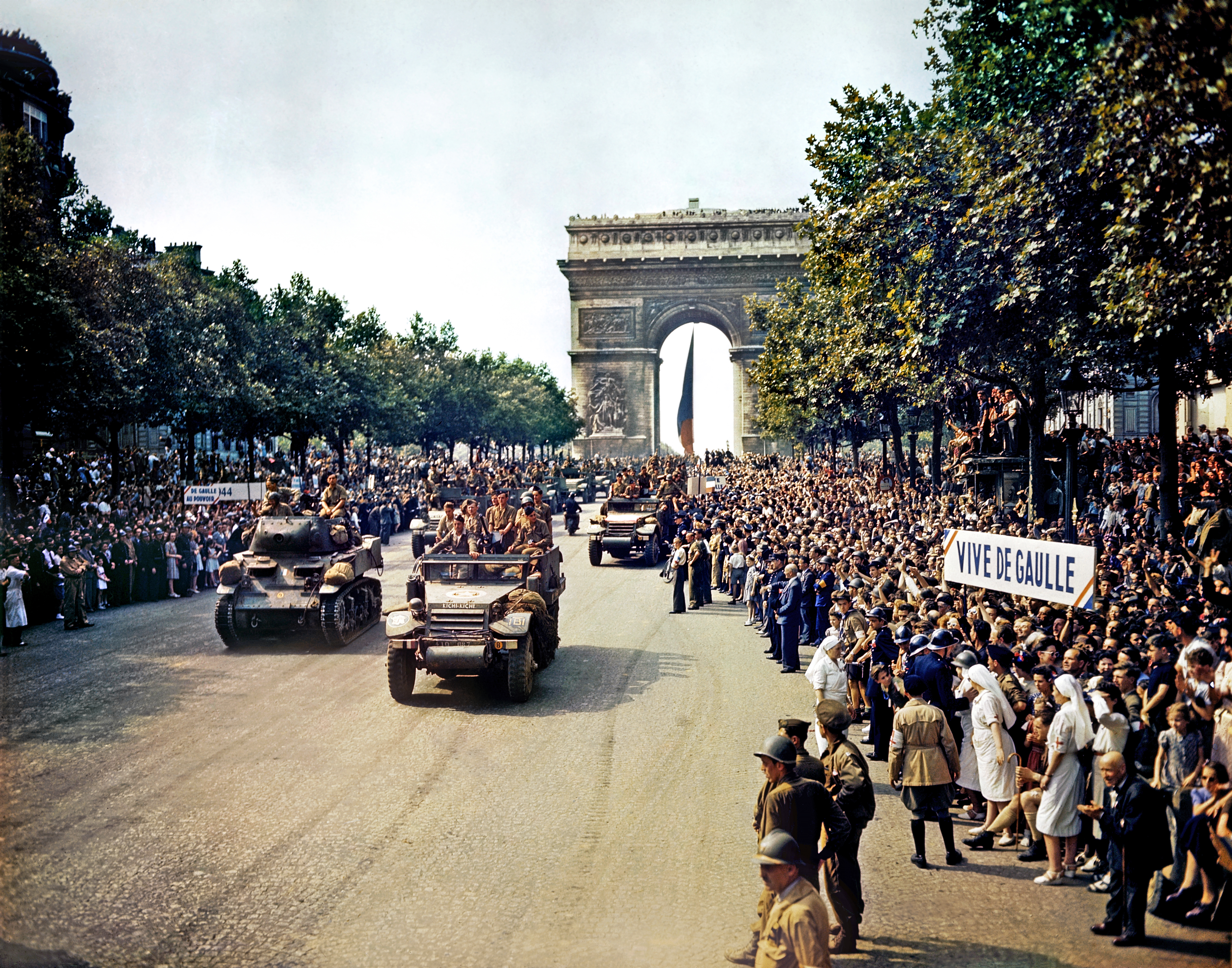
The 2nd Armored Division marching on the Champs Élysées on 26 August 1944.

The most celebrated moment in the unit's history was the Liberation of Paris. Allied strategy emphasised destroying German forces retreating towards the river Rhine and considered that attack on Paris would risk destroying it, but when the French Resistance under Henri Rol-Tanguy staged an uprising in the city from 19 August, Charles de Gaulle threatened to send the division into Paris, single-handedly, to prevent the uprising being crushed as was then happening in Warsaw. US General Dwight D. Eisenhower agreed to let the French armoured division and the US 4th Infantry Division liberate Paris. In the early morning of 23 August, Leclerc's 2e DB left the south of Argentan on its march to Paris, a march which was slowed by poor road conditions, French crowds, and fierce combat near Paris. On 24 August, General Leclerc sent a small advance party to enter the city, with the message that the Second Armored would be there the following day. This party, commanded by Captain Raymond Dronne, consisted of the 9th company (La Nueve) (Note: Made up of volunteers, mostly Spanish Republicans, the 9th company bore the name La Nueve, in Spanish, for its number "nine".) of the 3rd Battalion of the Régiment de marche du Tchad. Dronne and his men arrived at the Hôtel de Ville, in the centre of Paris, shortly before 9:30 pm on the evening of 24 August. On 25 August, the 2nd Armored and the US 4th Division entered Paris and liberated it. After hard fighting that cost the 2nd Division 35 tanks, 6 self-propelled guns, and 111 vehicles, von Choltitz, the German military governor of Paris, capitulated at the Hôtel Meurice. The following day, 26 August, a great victory parade took place on the Champs Élysées, which was lined with a jubilant crowd acclaiming General de Gaulle and the liberators of Paris.

=== Alsace and Lorraine ===
The 2nd Division later fought in the tank battles in Lorraine. On 13 September 1944 at the town of Dompaire 'Groupement Langlade' destroyed the German 112th Panzer Brigade. Subsequently, the 2nd Division operated with US forces during the assault into the Vosges Mountains. Serving as the armoured exploitation force for the US XV Corps, the 2nd Division forced the Saverne Gap and thrust forward boldly, unbalancing German defences in northern Alsace and liberating Strasbourg on 23 November 1944. The Presidential Unit Citation was awarded to the division for this action.

Fighting in Alsace until the end of February 1945, the 2nd Division was later deployed to reduce the Royan Pocket on the western coast of France in March–April 1945.

=== Germany ===
After forcing the Germans in the Royan Pocket to surrender on 18 April 1945, the 2nd Division crossed France again to rejoin the Allied 6th Army Group for final operations in Germany. Operating with the US 12th Armored Division, elements of the French 2nd Armored Division pursued the remnants of German Army Group G across Swabia and Bavaria, occupying the town of Bad Reichenhall on 4 May 1945. Eventually, the 2nd Division finished its campaigning at the Nazi resort town of Berchtesgaden in Southeastern Germany.

=== Division combat casualties ===
According to Defence Historical Service, the unit counted 1,224 dead (including 96 Maghrebis) and 5,257 wounded (including 584 Maghrebis) at the end of the campaign in northwestern Europe. It had killed 13,000 Axis soldiers, captured 50,000 and destroyed 332 heavy and medium tanks, 2,200 other vehicles, and 426 cannons of various types. According to another source, the unit counted 1,687 dead, including 108 officers, and 3,300 wounded .

== Cold War ==
On 13 May 1945, SHAEF relinquished operational control of the 2nd Armored Division to France. From 23 to 28 May 1945, the 2nd Division moved to its new garrison in the region of Paris, where it was deactivated on 31 March 1946.

There are records from the late 1960s and early 1970s of 501 Régiment de Chars de Combat (501 RCC) being part of the 2nd Brigade of the 8th Armored Division, part of the 1st Corps of the First Army (France). The 2nd Brigade of the 8th Armored Division 'qui est l'heritière des traditions de la 2e DB' – carried on the traditions of the 2nd Armored Division.

The French Army was extensively reorganised in 1977, with three-brigade divisions being dissolved and small divisions of four or five manoeuvre regiments/battalions being created. The 2nd Armored Division appears to have been reformed at this time. From the late 1970s until 1999, the 2nd Division was headquartered in Versailles and was subordinated to the III Corps (France).

== Present day ==
It became the 2nd Armoured Brigade in 1999.

== See also ==
- Battle of Kufra
- Battle for Paris
- Liberation of France
- Military history of France during World War II
- General Leclerc
- Jean Rémy
- The Rochambelles

== Bibliography ==
- Les Grandes Unités Françaises (GUF), Volume V, Part 2, Service Historique de l'Armée de Terre, Paris: Imprimerie Nationale, 1975.
- historynet article on Berchtesgaden capture
