= Battle of Alsace =

Battle fought during the second World War

- Part of the Second World War
Date	November 20, 1944 – March 19, 1945
Location	Alsace, France
Result	Decisive Allied victory

Belligerents
France; United States	Germany

Casualties and losses
France: ~3,000/4,000 killed, several thousands injured.; United States: Thousands killed and injured.	Germany: approximately 23,000 killed or injured; 23,000 prisoners.

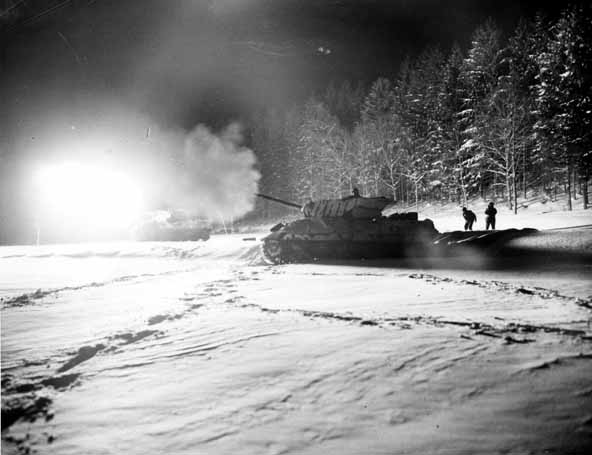
In January 1945, a M10 tank destroyer opens fire in the snow near Sparsbach.

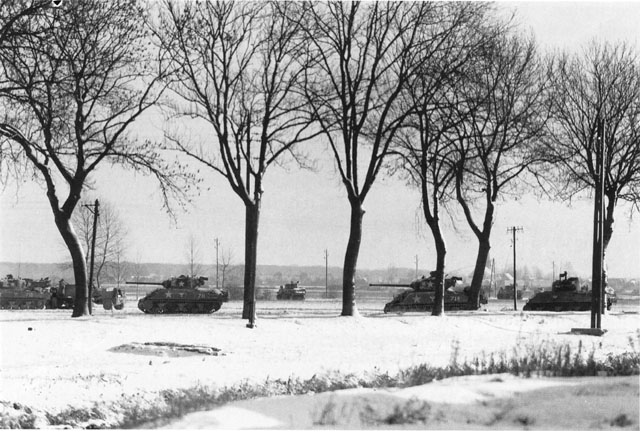
American tanks heading towards Drusenheim in January 1945.

The Battle of Alsace was a military campaign between the Allies, mainly French, and the Germans in Alsace, eastern France, from 20 November 1944 to 19 March 1945. It led to the liberation of Alsace by the Allies.

== Context ==
During the second phase of World War II, the Allies landed in Normandy starting from 6 June 1944 and in Provence starting from 15 August 1944. These two new fronts have expanded and allowed the liberation of a large part of the French territory within the span of a few months. Exceptions were the "Atlantic pockets" and Alsace, the latter region being where the Allied troops, mainly French troops, focused their efforts starting in November 1944.

The battle took part next to the Battle of the Vosges.

== Course of the battle ==
The operations were launched from the Vosges and the Belfort Gap. Mulhouse was liberated on 21 November 1944, by General Béthouart, and Strasbourg on November 23 by General Leclerc while leading the 2nd Armored Division.

The Germans resisted and launched a strong counteroffensive, Operation Nordwind, on 1 January 1945. At that time, Eisenhower, the commander in chief, wanted to retreat and temporarily evacuate Alsace, but General de Gaulle opposed it and sent reinforcements to defend Strasbourg. The German counterattack was stopped.

General de Lattre, commanding the French 1st Army, launched a double offensive with his two army corps to defeat the Colmar Pocket. The 1st army corps operated from Mulhouse; the 2nd army corps, assisted by the XXI Corps, advanced from the northwest towards Neuf-Brisach. The French entered Colmar on 2 February 1945; the Colmar Pocket was cleared on February 9.

The last part of Alsace, from the Moder to the border, was liberated from March 15 to 19, 1945.

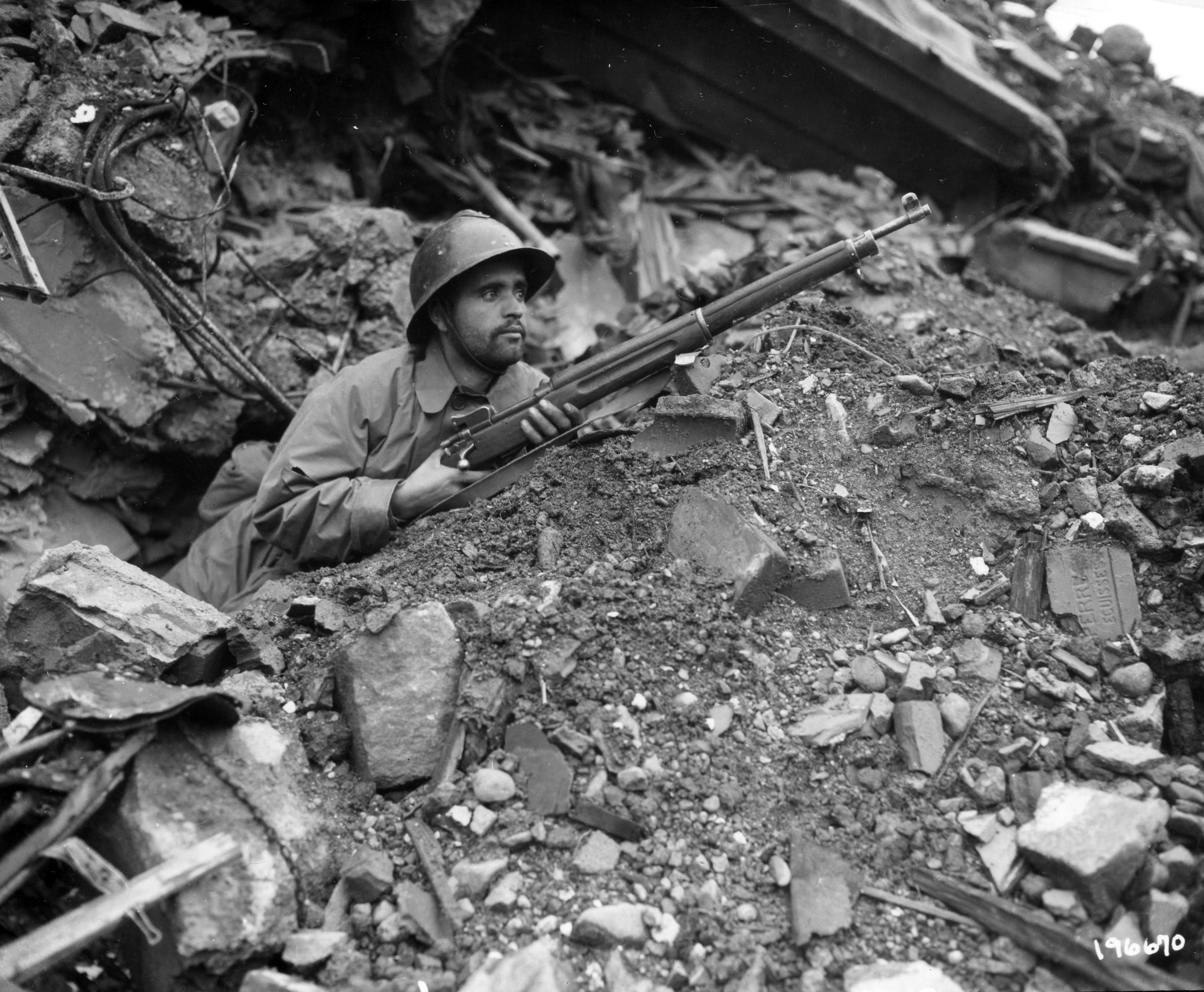
A Moroccan soldier waits in cover for an expected German counterattack near Mulhouse, 22 November 1944

== Bibliography and sources ==
- Rowley, Anthony, ed. (2002). Dictionnaire d'histoire de France. Paris: Perrin. p. 32. ISBN 9782262013219. OCLC 301690235.
- Larousse, Éditions. "Campagne d'Alsace novembre 1944-mars 1945 - LAROUSSE". www.larousse.fr (in French).
- Vonau, Jean-Laurent (2022). L'Alsace annexée: 1940-1945. Strasbourg: Signe. pp. 416–461. ISBN 978-2-7468-4242-7.

== See also ==
- World War II
- Lorraine campaign
- Colmar Pocket
- Operation Nordwind
- Liberation of Strasbourg
