= House of Hauteclocque =

French noble family

Coat of arms of the Hauteclocque family

The House of Hauteclocque is a French noble family established during the Middle Ages by the lords of the fief of Hautecloque. Its most illustrious member is Philippe Leclerc de Hauteclocque (1902–1947), leader of the Free French Forces during the Second World War and Marshal of France. Haulte clocque in Middle French means "High Bell"; this explains the familial motto, "On entend loing sonner haulte clocque" (One can hear from far away the ringing of the high bell).

== History ==
Members of the House of Hauteclocque served in the Fifth Crusade against Egypt, and again in the Eighth Crusade of Saint Louis against Tunisia in 1270. They had also fought at the Battle of Saint-Omer in 1340 during the Hundred Years' War and the Battle of Fontenoy in 1745 during the War of the Austrian Succession. The family survived the French Revolution. Three members of the family served in Napoleon's Grande Armée and a fourth, who suffered from weak health, in the supply train. The youngest of these had a son, who became a noted egyptologist; he, in turn, had three sons: the first and third became officers in the French Army, serving in colonial campaigns before being killed in the First World War; the middle son, who also served in World War I but survived the conflict and thus inherited the family estate in Belloy-Saint-Léonard, was Philippe Leclerc's father.

== Coat of arms and motto ==
Coat of Arms	Motto
	On entend loing haulte clocque (One can hear from far away the high bell)
