= Franz Vaterrodt =

German general (1890–1969)

Personal details
- Born: 29 April 1890 Diedenhofen (Thionville), Alsace-Lorraine
- Died: 28 February 1969 (aged 78) Bad Krozingen, Baden-Württemberg, West Germany
- Awards: Knight's cross of the royal house of Hohenzollern with swords

Military service
- Allegiance: German Empire; Weimar Republic; Nazi Germany
- Branch/service: Prussian Army; Imperial German Army; Reichswehr; Ordnungspolizei; Wehrmacht
- Years of service: 1909–1944
- Rank: Generalmajor
- Unit: 2. Unter-Elsässisches Infanterie-Regiment Nr. 137; Infanterie-Regiment 14; Infanterie-Regiment 623; Sicherungs-Regiment 56
- Commands: Chief of the Ordnungspolizei; Kommandant of Strasbourg
- Battles/wars: World War I World War II: Liberation of Strasbourg

Franz Vaterrodt (29 April 1890 – 28 February 1969) was a German general of the Second World War. From March 1941 to November 1944, he was the commander of the Place de Strasbourg.

== Early years ==
Franz Vaterrodt was born in then Diedenhofen (now Thionville), in annexed Lorraine, on April 29, 1890. The city was then a lively stronghold of Alsace-Lorraine. Franz Vaterrodt intended for a military career very early on. On 29 November 1909, he enlisted as Fahnenjunker in the Royal Prussian Army and served as a company officer with the 2nd Lower Alsatian Infantry Regiment No. 137 (German: 2. Unter-Elsässisches Infanterie-Regiment Nr. 137). After an internship at the military academy, Vaterrodt was promoted to Leutnant (second lieutenant), in June 1911. A company officer, he still served with the 137th Infantry-Regiment, when the First World War broke out.

== First World War ==
Vaterrodt took part in military operations with his regiment from the start of the conflict. In June 1915, he was promoted to Oberleutnant (first lieutenant). Well noted, Lieutenant Vaterrodt was promoted to Hauptmann (captain), on 15 July 1918. Before the end of hostilities, Franz Vaterrodt had received the iron crosses, 2nd and 1st classes and the prestigious knight's cross of the royal house of Hohenzollern with swords.

== Interwar years ==
After the war, he was first transferred to the Reichswehr-Schützen-Regiment 8 (Reichswehr Rifle Regiment 8) with his rank of captain in the 200,000-man transition army. But the drastic downsizing of the new Reichswehr to 100,000 men forced him to leave the army for the Baden police; being discharged in September 30 and admitted on October 1, 1920. He gradually climbed the hierarchical ranks, passing to Major at the end of the 1920s. In the spring of 1933, as a favorite of the new Reich Commissioner Robert Wagner, he was promoted Oberstleutnant der Polizei (lieutenant-colonel of police) and appointed Chief of the Ordnungspolizei as successor to Erich Blankenhorn in April 1933. On October 1, 1933, he was promoted to Oberst der Polizei (colonel of police); at the same time he was appointed commander of the Baden police and gendarmerie. With the creation of the Wehrmacht in August 1935, the Baden police commander returned to the army while retaining his rank; his promotion set to September 1, 1934. He was then appointed commander of the 1st Battalion of the Heilbronn Infantry Regiment (German: Infanterie-Regiment Heilbronn). When associations were exposed, he was appointed commander of the 1st Battalion of 55th Infantry Regiment (German: Infanterie-Regiment 55) in Würzburg on October 15, 1935. As such, he was promoted to Oberst (colonel) on March 1, 1937. On April 1, 1938, he was appointed commander of the 14th Infantry Regiment (German: Infanterie-Regiment 14) as the successor to Colonel Heinrich Clößner. On May 31, 1939, he passed his command to Colonel Karl Faulenbach.

== World War Two ==
When mobilizing for World War II in the summer of 1939, he was ill. On December 1, 1939, he was appointed commander of a security infantry regiment (German: Landesschützen-Regiment). In this capacity he was posted with his regiment in the military district of Prague. In February 1940, he was appointed commander of the commander of the 623th Infantry Regiment (German: Infanterie-Regiment 623), subordinated to the 554th Infantry Division (German: 554. Infanterie-Division), after the formation of his regiment and deployed with this unit on the Upper Rhine. In August 1940, he was placed in the Führerreserve. A month later, in September 1940, Colonel Vaterrodt was appointed Kommandeur (commander) of the Landesschützen-Regiment z.b.V. 56 (Sicherungs-Regiment 56).

On March 18, 1941, he was appointed Wehrmacht commander of Strasbourg, immediately taking office. As such, he was promoted to Generalmajor (major general) on March 1, 1941. He then retained his command of Strasbourg for three years, even after the Allied invasion in the summer of 1944. When the French attacked the city on November 23, 1944, he withdrew with about 600 soldiers to Fort Ney, north of Strasbourg. On November 25, 1944, he surrendered to the French with 626 soldiers, going into captivity with 5,000 prisoners taken in the Strasbourg region. This surrender earned Vaterrodt a court martial and a death sentence in absentia; a sentence that could never be carried out by the German High Command.

== Later years ==
He was released from captivity on August 25, 1947. That year he wrote a 22-page report on the history of Strasbourg in November 1944 for the US Historical Division under the serial number B-545. Franz Vaterrodt died in Bad Krozingen, Baden-Württemberg, in West Germany on February 28, 1969.

== Awards ==
- Ritterkreuz mit Schwertern, Hohenzollern Hausorden.
- Eisernes Kreuz, 2nd and 1st classes (1914-1918).

== Sources ==
- Vaterrodt, Franz in Lexikon der Wehrmacht.
