= Liberation of Strasbourg =

Freeing of Strasbourg, France from German occupation during World War II

- Part of the liberation of France
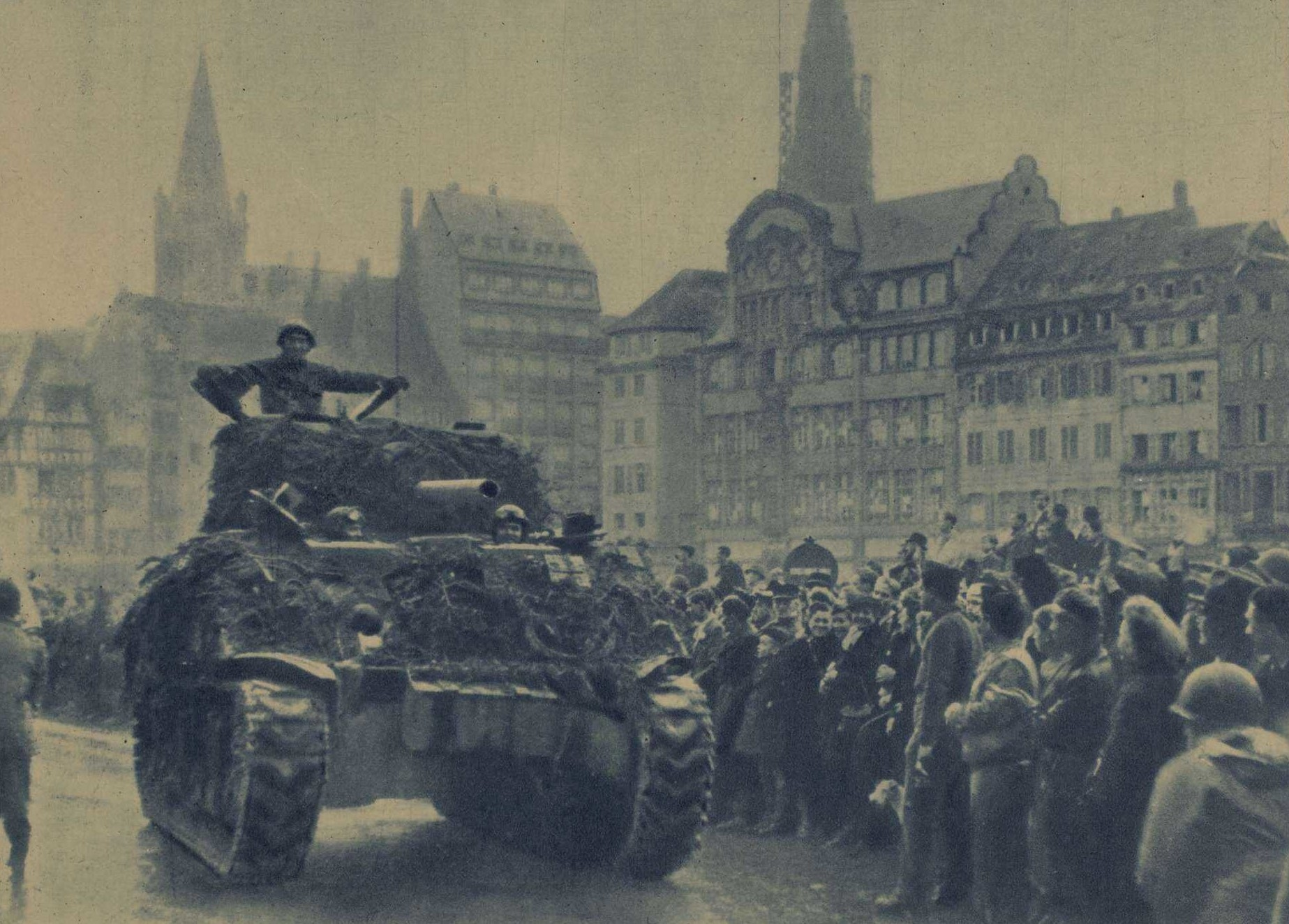
- French Sherman tanks parading on Place Kléber
Date	23 November 1944
Location	Strasbourg, France 48.5833°N 7.7458°E
Result	Allied victory

Belligerents
France; United States	Germany

Commanders and leaders
(Provisional Government of the French Republic) Philippe Leclerc (United States) Wade H. Haislip	(Nazi Germany) Franz Vaterrodt (POW)

Casualties and losses
Unknown	18-23 November; 2,000+ killed 12,500 captured

The liberation of Strasbourg took place on 23 November 1944 during the Alsace campaign (November 1944 – March 1945) in the last months of World War II. After the liberation of Mulhouse on 21 November 1944 by the 1st Armored Division, General Philippe Leclerc de Hauteclocque and the 2nd Armored Division entered the city of Strasbourg in France after having liberated Sarrebourg and La Petite-Pierre from Nazi Germany, clearing the way for the advance on Strasbourg.

== Background ==
=== Timeline ===
- 6 June 1944: Allies land on Normandy coastline, beginning the liberation of mainland France.
- 1 August: French 2nd Armoured Division (2nd DB) led by General Leclerc arrives in Normandy, joins General Patton's Third US Army.
- 2nd DB actively takes part in liberating Normandy and then heads towards Paris.
- Initially, the Americans saw Paris as a secondary objective, but Leclerc and de Gaulle convinced Eisenhower to change the plan.
- Paris is liberated on 25 August with the arrival of Leclerc's tanks, celebrated by de Gaulle and Leclerc riding down Champs-Élysées.
- Despite victories in the West, large areas of France were still under Nazi control.
- 22 November 1944: The U.S. XV Corps under General Wade H. Haislip broke through the Saverne Gap in the Vosges Mountains, opening the route for Leclerc’s 2nd Armoured Division to advance on Strasbourg.

== Battle ==
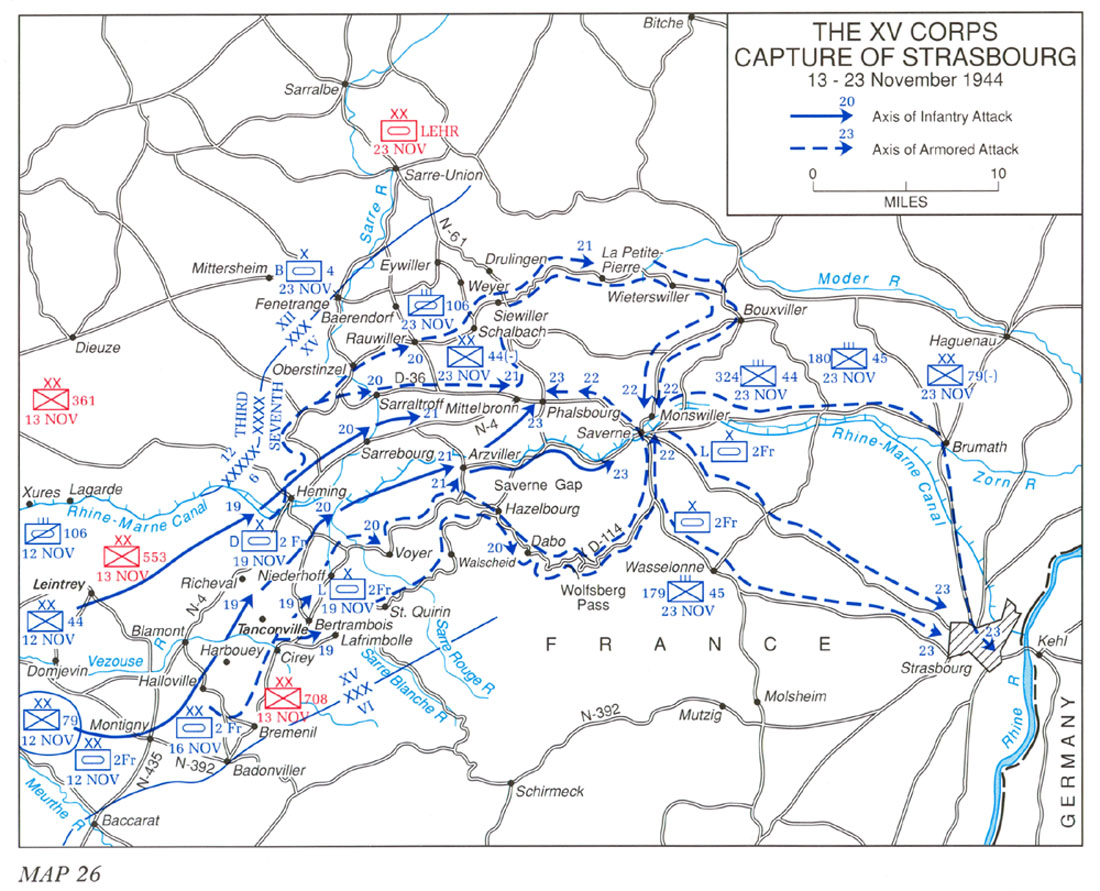
The routes taken by US and French forces involved in the liberation of Strasbourg

On 22 November 1944, the French 2nd Armored Division, along with the French First Army, was directed to capture Strasbourg by the Allied Supreme Command. That same day, the 2nd DB moved up to the vital pass at Saverne, which had been seized by U.S. XV Corps under General Wade H. Haislip. This breakthrough through the Vosges Mountains, often called the “Saverne Gap,” opened a direct line of advance on Strasbourg for Leclerc’s armored columns.

At 7 a.m. on 23 November 1944, the 2nd DB advanced on Strasbourg in five columns guided by Alsatian FFI fighters. They reached the faubourgs and the western belt of the city's fortifications (forts Foch, Pétain and Kléber) around 9 a.m. The forts were well defended and reinforced by anti-tank ditches and trenches that the population of Strasbourg had had to dig, and stopped the progression of the French columns. However, the column coming from the north along the Marne-Rhine Canal, guided by FFI member Robert Fleig, pierced the defensive line and entered Strasbourg. The column's commander, Lieutenant-Colonel Rouvillois, transmitted the message tissu est dans iode ("tissue is in iodine"), which informed General Leclerc that the 2nd DB was in Strasbourg and was pushing towards the Kehl Bridge over the Rhine, following one of the two routes proposed by Fleig. The other columns changed their axis of progression to fall back on his route.

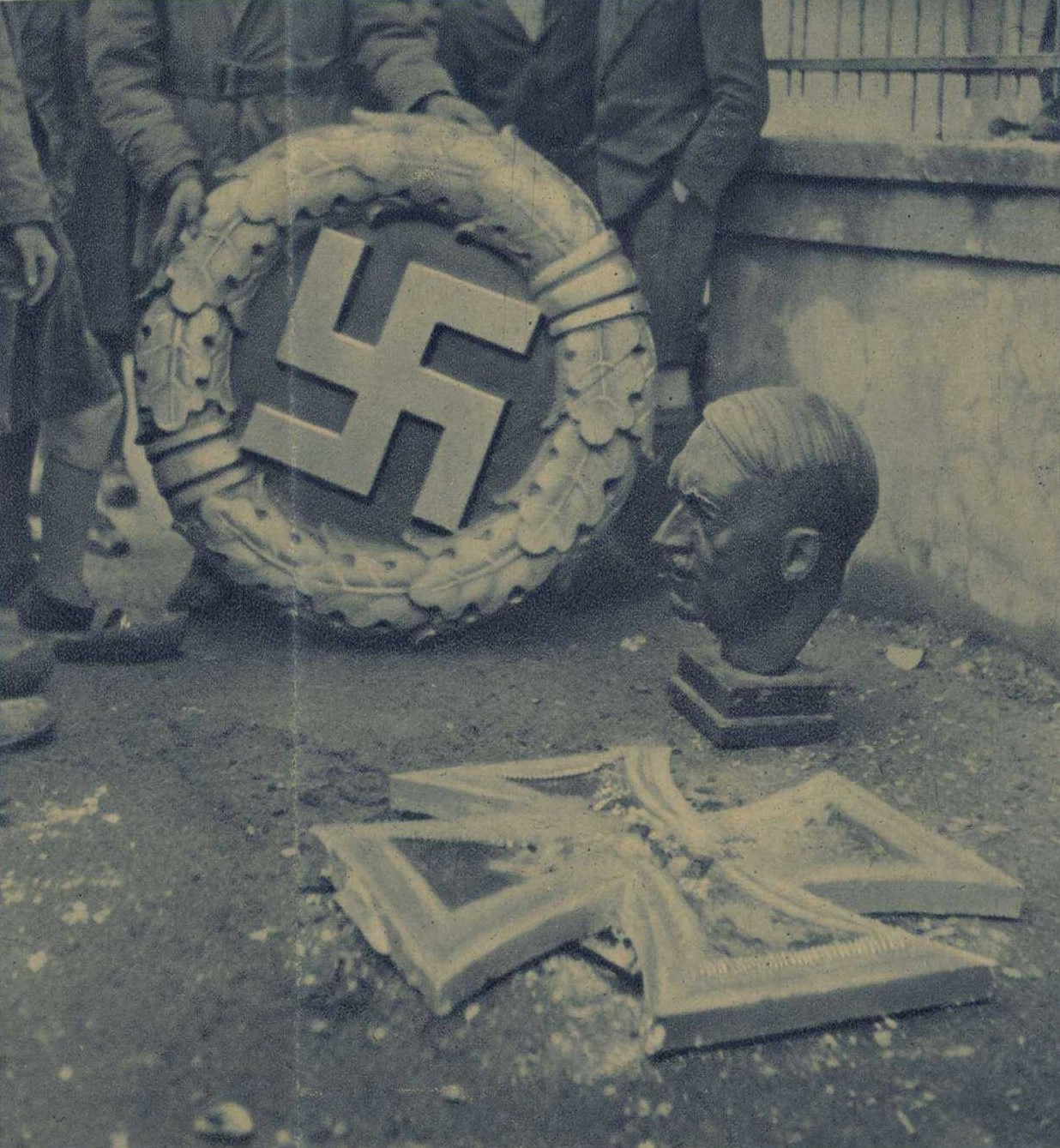
Nazi memorabilia looted in liberated Strasbourg: a Swastika, an Iron Cross and a bust of Adolf Hitler

The city was taken by complete surprise, with trams, packed with passengers, circulating normally. Gauleiter Robert Heinrich Wagner had just enough time to flee across the Rhine and 15,000 German civilians were arrested, although the proximity to the border allowed many others to escape. The chief of staff of General Franz Vaterrodt, the commander of Strasbourg, was captured during his daily morning walk by a platoon of five Shermans. The Kommandantur and part of General Vaterrodt's staff were captured at the Palais du Rhin. The general managed to entrench himself with 600 men in Fort Ney in the Robertsau forest, north of Strasbourg.The French quickly reached the Kehl Bridge, but were unable to cross it due to heavy enemy fire. The hope of a bridgehead in Germany faded despite fierce fighting, during which FFI guide Fleig was killed.

At 2:20 p.m. on 23 November, the French flag was hoisted at the top of Strasbourg Cathedral. The city had been liberated but the fighting was not over. For several days, the 2nd DB and FFI fighters under Georges Kiefer (nom de guerre "Commandant François") cleaned out pockets of resistance. The Esplanade quarter, where the barracks were located, was one of the most difficult to reduce, along with the port area. FFI fighters guided the tanks, provided valuable infantry for urban combat, escorted prisoners, and served as translators for the intelligence service of the 2nd DB. Thanks to French Resistance fighter Robert Kleffer, head of the FFI in La Wantzenau, a large part of the German garrison was prevented from crossing the Rhine.

On 25 November, General Vaterrodt capitulated with the garrison of Fort Ney (626 men), bringing the number of captured German military personnel to around 6,000. The city was subjected to heavy artillery fire. During the night of 27-28 November, the last German soldiers retreated to the other side of the Rhine and blew up the Kehl Bridge. On 27 November, the mayor of Strasbourg before the occupation, Charles Frey, resumed his duties. General Charles de Gaulle appointed Charles Blondel as Commissioner of the Republic and Gaston Haelling as Prefect of Bas-Rhin.

== Aftermath ==
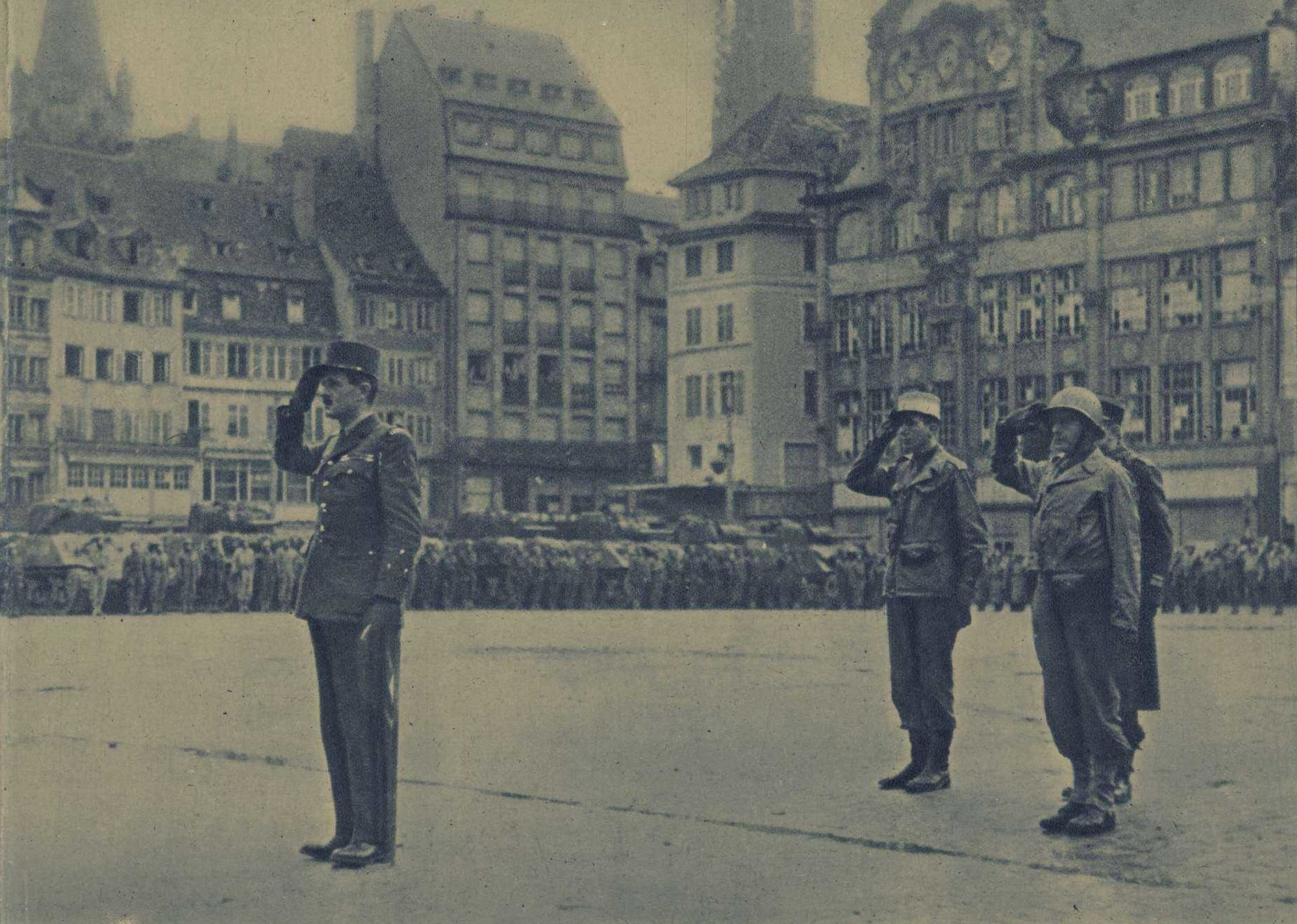
General Leclerc (left) reviewing his troops on Place Kléber

The rapid liberation of Strasbourg by General Leclerc's 2nd Armored Division produced a torrent of joy in the newly liberated French nation and was a major symbolic victory for both the French and the Western Allies. Leclerc was well respected and liked by his American contemporaries, unlike some other French commanders. The liberation of Strasbourg and the raising of the tricolor over its cathedral was considered to be the last major objective in the liberation of France.

The Allies were unable to quickly capitalize on the German collapse. While fuel shortages and the increasing difficulty of supporting armies with lengthening supply lines played a role, General Dwight D. Eisenhower's lack of interest in his southern flank largely doomed any further exploitation of the situation around Strasbourg. 6th Army Group commander General Jacob L. Devers believed he could cross the Rhine quickly at Rastatt, thereby seizing a bridgehead. However, Devers' ambitious nature and aggressive personality alienated other commanders such as Eisenhower, and he failed to convince the Supreme Commander of his plan.

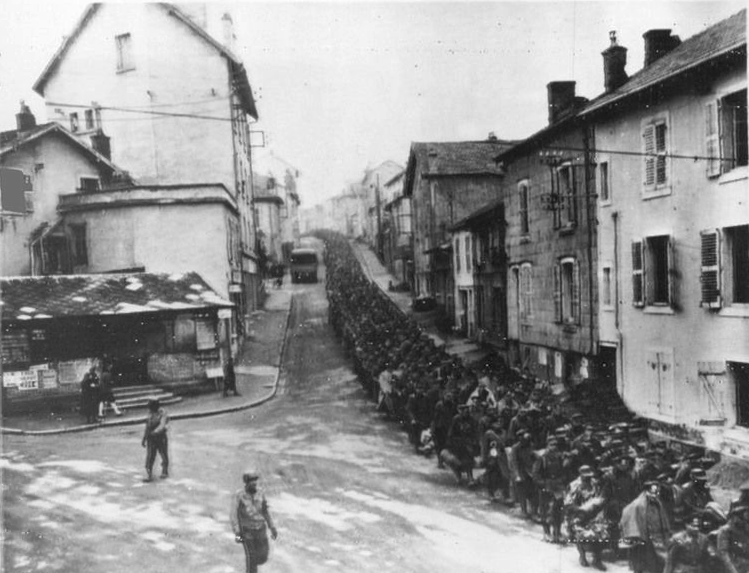
Column of German POWs captured at Strasbourg marching through Épinal, 7 December 1944

A quickly seized bridgehead at Rastatt could have secured the southern flank and disrupted the impending German offensive in the Ardennes. But Eisenhower never seriously considered the opportunity, as he seemed fixated on a more direct route to Berlin. As a result, Strasbourg came under threat during the German Wacht am Rhein offensive (the Battle of the Bulge).

The German collective memory of the battle is bleaker. In Ardennes: 1944, Antony Beevor states that the Battle for Strasbourg was one of the more "inglorious episodes" in German military history: with a collapse of the Wehrmacht, defeat was both premature and ignominious. It was hastened by a panic of senior Nazi leadership as many officials fled prior to the Allied push. This led to a general demoralization of Heer, Waffen-SS, and Luftwaffe ground forces as well as a breakdown in discipline. He states: ″The SS had looted Strasbourg before withdrawing. According to one general defending the town, soldiers ordered to 'fight to the last round' tended to throw away most of their ammunition before the battle so they could claim that they ran out and then surrendered. Generalmajor Vaterrodt, the Heer commander, was scornful about the behavior of senior officers and Nazi Party officials. 'I'm surprised that Himmler did not have anyone hanged in Strasbourg,' he told fellow officers after he had been captured. 'Everyone ran away, Kreisleiter, Ortsgruppenleiter, the municipal authorities, the mayor and the deputy mayor, they all took to their heels, government officials--all fled.'" The Alsatian-born Chief Magistrate also fled towards Germany on foot with a backpack--as he had signed many death warrants and collaborated within the German occupation system and was therefore a marked man.

=== German counterattack ===
In early January 1945, German forces counterattacked into northern Alsace (Operation Nordwind). Other German forces attacked north from the Colmar Pocket toward Strasbourg (Operation Solstice). The attacks were contained, but caused both Eisenhower and Devers to consider a general withdrawal from Alsace, which would have left Strasbourg undefended. The French Provisional Government considered this an anathema, as it would be, in General de Gaulle's words, "a national disaster." The German radio announced that in a few days the swastika "will fly over the Strasbourg Cathedral." In addition to this, hundreds of thousands of Alsatians would be subjected to German reprisals. As a Strasbourgeoise woman, identified as Madame Siegfried, said in an interview:

To have enjoyed six weeks of liberty after three years of permanent tension, permanent fear, and to believe once again that they [the Germans] would come back; it was beyond my forces. It was such a panic, a true fear as I have never known since then. Neither the bombings nor anything else but to hear they might come back!

The talk of a strategic withdrawal was also a blow to morale of the American VI Corps that had fought hard and suffered many casualties securing the area. In response, de Gaulle threatened to pull his forces out of the overall SHAEF Command, leading to serious tension with Eisenhower. With the support of British rime Minister Winston Churchill, de Gaulle persuaded Eisenhower after a contentious discussion. Strasbourg was not to be abandoned and the order to withdraw to the east of the Vosges Mountains was rescinded - contributing to improved morale.

General Jean de Lattre announced to the civilian population that Strasbourg, "liberated by Frenchmen, would be defended by Frenchmen." The French 1st Army defended the city against the five German divisions attacking from the south despite suffering heavy losses.

The French held their ground and the German advance was halted in desperate fighting about 30 kilometers south of Strasbourg. Operations Nordwind and Solstice were an operational failure with several Heer and Waffen-SS divisions badly mauled.

== Impact ==
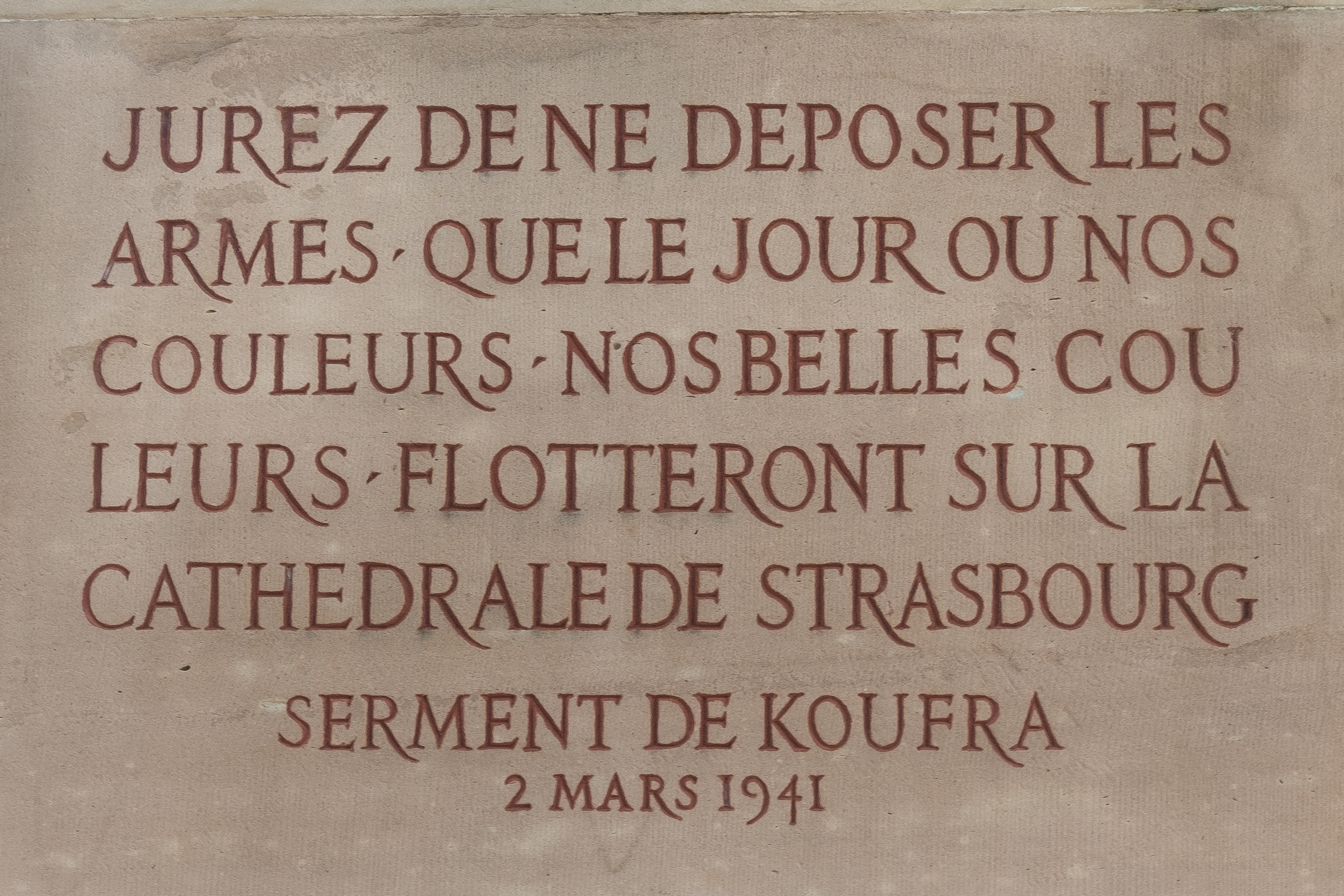
A plaque commemorating the Oath of Kufra near Strasbourg Cathedral.

The Liberation of Strasbourg is commemorated throughout Alsace for its role in the Allies' advance across France toward Germany in 1944 Memorials include the Museum of the Surrender, the Memorial-Museum of the Colmar Pocket, and MM Park.

Strasbourg had been the focus of French-German enmity since the Franco-Prussian War of 1870–71, and General Charles de Gaulle insisted that French forces lead the liberation of Strasbourg. After the victory in the battle of Kufra, General Philippe Leclerc de Hauteclocque and his troops swore an oath to fight until "our flag flies over the Cathedral of Strasbourg." The oath was fulfilled on 23 November 1944, when the 2nd French Armoured Division under Leclerc's command liberated Strasbourg.
