= Belloy-Saint-Léonard =

- Commune
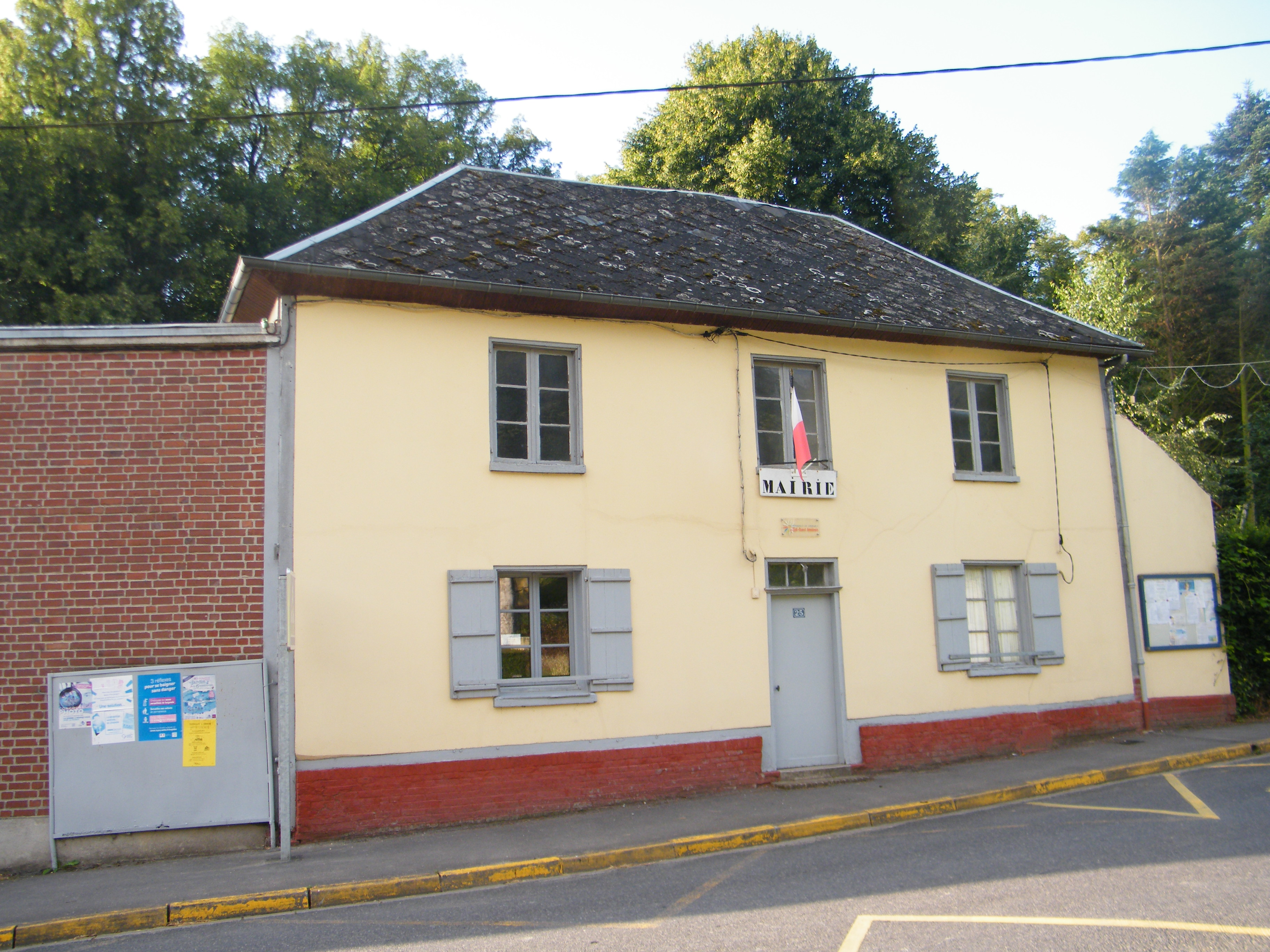
- The town hall in Belloy-St-Léonard

- Coat of arms
- Location of Belloy-Saint-Léonard
- Location within France Location within Hauts-de-France
- Coordinates: 49°54′27″N 1°54′16″E
- Country: France
- Region: Hauts-de-France
- Department: Somme
- Arrondissement: Amiens
- Canton: Poix-de-Picardie
- Intercommunality: CC Somme Sud-Ouest

Government
  - Mayor (2020–2026): Jean-Paul Poiré
- Area^{1}: 6.55 km^{2} (2.53 sq mi)
- Elevation: 123 m (404 ft)
- Highest elevation: 130 m (430 ft)
- Lowest elevation: 48 m (157 ft)
- Population (2023): 80
  - Density: 12/km^{2} (32/sq mi)
- Time zone: UTC+01:00 (CET)
  - Summer (DST): UTC+02:00 (CEST)
- INSEE/Postal code: 80081 /80270
- ^{1} French Land Register data, which excludes lakes, ponds, glaciers > 1 km^{2} (0.386 sq mi or 247 acres) and river estuaries.

Belloy-Saint-Léonard (French pronunciation: [bɛlwa sɛ̃ leɔnaʁ]; Picard: Belloy-Saint-Lèyonârd) is a commune in the Somme département in Hauts-de-France, which is situated in northern France.

== Geography ==
The commune is situated on the D157 road, 29 kilometres (18 mi) west of Amiens and 32 kilometres (20 mi) south of Abbeville.

== Population ==
Historical population
Year	Pop.	±% p.a.
1968	103	—
1975	113	+1.33%
1982	107	−0.78%
1990	97	−1.22%
1999	102	+0.56%
2007	90	−1.55%
2012	91	+0.22%
2017	92	+0.22%
2023	80	−2.30%
Source: INSEE

== Personalities ==
- Philippe Leclerc de Hauteclocque, Marshal of France, born in Belloy-Saint-Léonard, 22 November 1902.

== See also ==
- Communes of the Somme department
