= Philippe Leclerc de Hauteclocque =

French general (1902–1947)

Marshal Philippe Leclerc de Hauteclocque
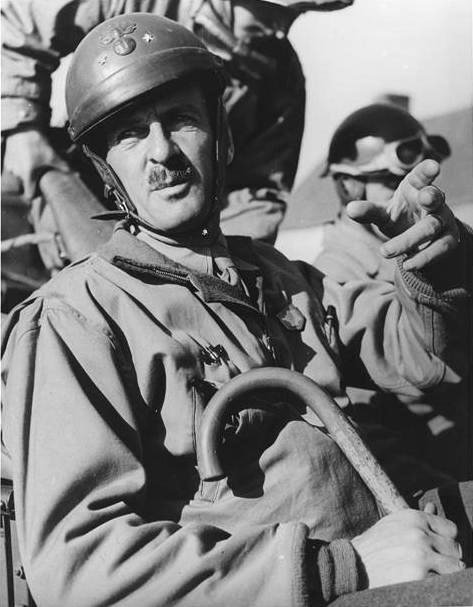
- Leclerc in 1944

Member of the Superior Council of Defence
- In office 12 April 1947 – 28 November 1947

Personal details
- Born: Philippe-François-Marie de Hauteclocque; 22 November 1902 Belloy-Saint-Léonard, France
- Died: 28 November 1947 (aged 45) Colomb-Béchar, French Algeria
- Cause of death: Aviation accident
- Resting place: Les Invalides
- Spouse: Thérèse de Gargan
- Children: Bénédicte; Charles; Henri; Hubert; Jeanne; Michel
- Parents: Adrien de Hauteclocque (father); Marie-Thérèse van der Cruisse de Waziers (mother)
- Education: Lycée Sainte-Geneviève; École Spéciale Militaire; Saumur Cavalry School; École Supérieure de Guerre
- Nickname: Leclerc

Military service
- Allegiance: Third Republic; Free France; Fourth Republic
- Branch/service: French Army: Cavalry
- Years of service: 1924–1947
- Rank: Army general (Note: Marshal of France is a dignity and not a rank.)
- Unit: List: 24th Dragoons Regiment; 5th Cuirassiers Regiment; 8th Moroccan Spahis Regiment; 1st Chasseurs d'Afrique Regiment; 4th Infantry Division
- Commands: List: Colonne Leclerc; L force; 2nd Armoured Division; French Far East Expeditionary Corps
- Battles/wars: List: Occupation of the Ruhr; Second World War; Battle of France; Battle of Gabon; Battle of Kufra; Battle of the Mareth; Liberation of Paris; Liberation of Strasbourg; War in Vietnam (1945–1946); First Indochina War

Philippe François Marie Leclerc de Hauteclocque (Note: French pronunciation: [filip ləklɛʁ də otklɔk]) (Note: Born Philippe François Marie de Hauteclocque, he was authorized to add his war pseudonym Leclerc to his name after the war.) (22 November 1902 – 28 November 1947) was a Free-French general during World War II. He became Marshal of France posthumously in 1952, and is known in France simply as le maréchal Leclerc or just Leclerc.

The son of an aristocratic family, Hauteclocque graduated from the École spéciale militaire de Saint-Cyr, the French military academy, in 1924. After service with the French occupation of the Ruhr and in Morocco, he returned to Saint-Cyr as an instructor. He was awarded the croix de guerre des théâtres d'opérations extérieures for leading goumiers in an attack on caves and ravines on Bou Amdoun on 11 August 1933.

During the Second World War he fought in the Battle of France. He was one of the first who defied his government's armistice to make his way to Britain to fight with the Free French under General Charles de Gaulle, adopting the nom de guerre of Leclerc so that his wife and children would not be put at risk if his name appeared in the papers. He was sent to French Equatorial Africa, where he rallied local leaders to the rebel Free French cause, and led a force against Gabon, whose leaders supported the French (Vichy) Government. From Chad he led raids into Italian Libya. After his forces captured Kufra, he had his men swear an oath known today as the Serment de Koufra, in which they pledged to fight on until their flag flew over the Strasbourg Cathedral. The forces under his command, known as L Force, campaigned in Libya in 1943, covered the Eighth Army's inland flank during its advance into Tunisia, and participated in the attack on the Mareth Line. L Force was then transformed into the 2e Division Blindée, although it was often referred to as La Division Leclerc. It fought under Leclerc's command in the Battle of Normandy, and participated in the liberation of Paris and Strasbourg.

After the end of World War II in Europe in May 1945, he was given command of the French Far East Expeditionary Corps (Corps expéditionnaire français en Extrême-Orient, CEFEO). He represented France at the surrender of the Japanese Empire in Tokyo Bay on 2 September 1945. He quickly perceived the necessity for a political solution to the nascent conflict in Indochina, but once again was ahead of his countrymen, and was recalled to France in 1946. He was killed in an air crash in Algeria in 1947.

== Early life ==
Coat of arms of House of Hauteclocque

Philippe-François-Marie de Hauteclocque was born on 22 November 1902 at Belloy-Saint-Léonard in the department of Somme, France. He was the fifth of six children of Adrien de Hauteclocque, comte de Hauteclocque (1864–1945), and Marie-Thérèse van der Cruisse de Waziers (1870–1956). Philippe was named in honour of an ancestor killed by Croatian soldiers in service of Habsburg monarchy during Thirty Years' War in 1635.

Hauteclocque came from an old line of country nobility. His direct ancestors had served in the Fifth Crusade against Egypt, and again in the Eighth Crusade of Saint Louis against Tunisia in 1270. They had also fought at the Battle of Saint-Omer in 1340 and the Battle of Fontenoy in 1745. The family managed to survive the French Revolution. Three members of the family served in Napoleon's Grande Armée and a fourth, who suffered from weak health, served in the supply train. The third son, Constantin, who had served in Napoleon's Russian Campaign, was created a chevalier by King Louis XVIII, and a Papal count by Pope Pius IX in 1857. Constantin had two sons. The older, Alfred François Marie (1822–1902), died childless. The younger, Gustave François Marie Joseph (1829–1914), became a noted Egyptologist.

Gustave, in turn, had three sons. The first, Henry (1862–1914), and third, Wallerand (1866–1914), became officers in the French Army, serving during the colonial campaigns, including fighting Samory in the Sudan. Both were killed in the early fighting of the First World War. The second son was Adrien, who enlisted in August 1914 as a trooper in the 11e Régiment de Chasseurs à Cheval, the regiment in which his son Guy was a cornet. Adrien was later commissioned, and was twice awarded the Croix de Guerre for gallantry. He survived the war, and inherited the family title and estate in Belloy-Saint-Léonard.

== Early military career ==
Philippe de Hauteclocque was homeschooled until he was 13, when he was sent to L'école de la Providence, a Jesuit school in Amiens. In 1920, at the age of 17, he went to Lycée privé Sainte-Geneviève, known as Ginette, a preparatory school in Versailles. He then entered the École spéciale militaire de Saint-Cyr, the French military academy. Each class has a name; his was Metz et Strasbourg after towns in Alsace and Lorraine returned to France by the Treaty of Versailles. He graduated on 1 October 1924, and was commissioned as a sous lieutenant in the French Army. Having chosen the cavalry branch, he then had to attend the Cavalry School in Saumur, from which he graduated first in his class on 8 August 1925.

Hauteclocque's older brother Guy had married Madeleine de Gargan, the daughter of the Baron de Gargan. Philippe became a frequent visitor to the Gargan household, and became enchanted by Madeleine's youngest sister Thérèse. The two courted while he was at Saint-Cyr. In the tradition of old noble families, Count Adrien asked Baron de Gargan for permission for Philippe to marry Thérèse. The wedding ceremony took place in the Church of St Joan of Arc in Rouen on 10 August 1925. For a wedding present, Adrien gave them a chateau in Tailly. They had six children: Henri (1926–1952), who was killed in the First Indochina War; Hubert (1927–2015), who served as mayor of Tailly from 2001 to 2008; Charles (1929–); Jeanne (1931–2018); Michel (1933–2014); and Bénédicte (1936–). Philippe and Thérèse hired an Austrian governess, and spoke German in front of their children to improve their command of the language.

Having graduated from Saumur, Hauteclocque joined his regiment, the 5e régiment de cuirassiers, which was then on occupation duty in Trier as part of the Franco-Belgian occupation of the Ruhr. Garrison duty was not to his liking, so he volunteered for service with the 8e Régiment de Spahis Marocains, based at Taza in Morocco. He was promoted to lieutenant in October 1926. In 1927, he was posted as an instructor at the Military School of Dar El-Beida at Meknes, the military academy of French Morocco. Here, he met Paul de Langlade, a First World War veteran eight years his senior, who would later volunteer to serve under his command. In 1929, he was attached to the 38e Goum Mixte Marocains, a Moroccan Goumier unit at M'Zizel in the Atlas Mountains. He saw action in the fighting against the Ait Hammou guerrillas. In one action, two horses were shot out from under him. Afterwards, he was posted to the 1er Régiment de Chasseurs d'Afrique, the senior cavalry regiment of the Armée d'Afrique, based at Rabat.

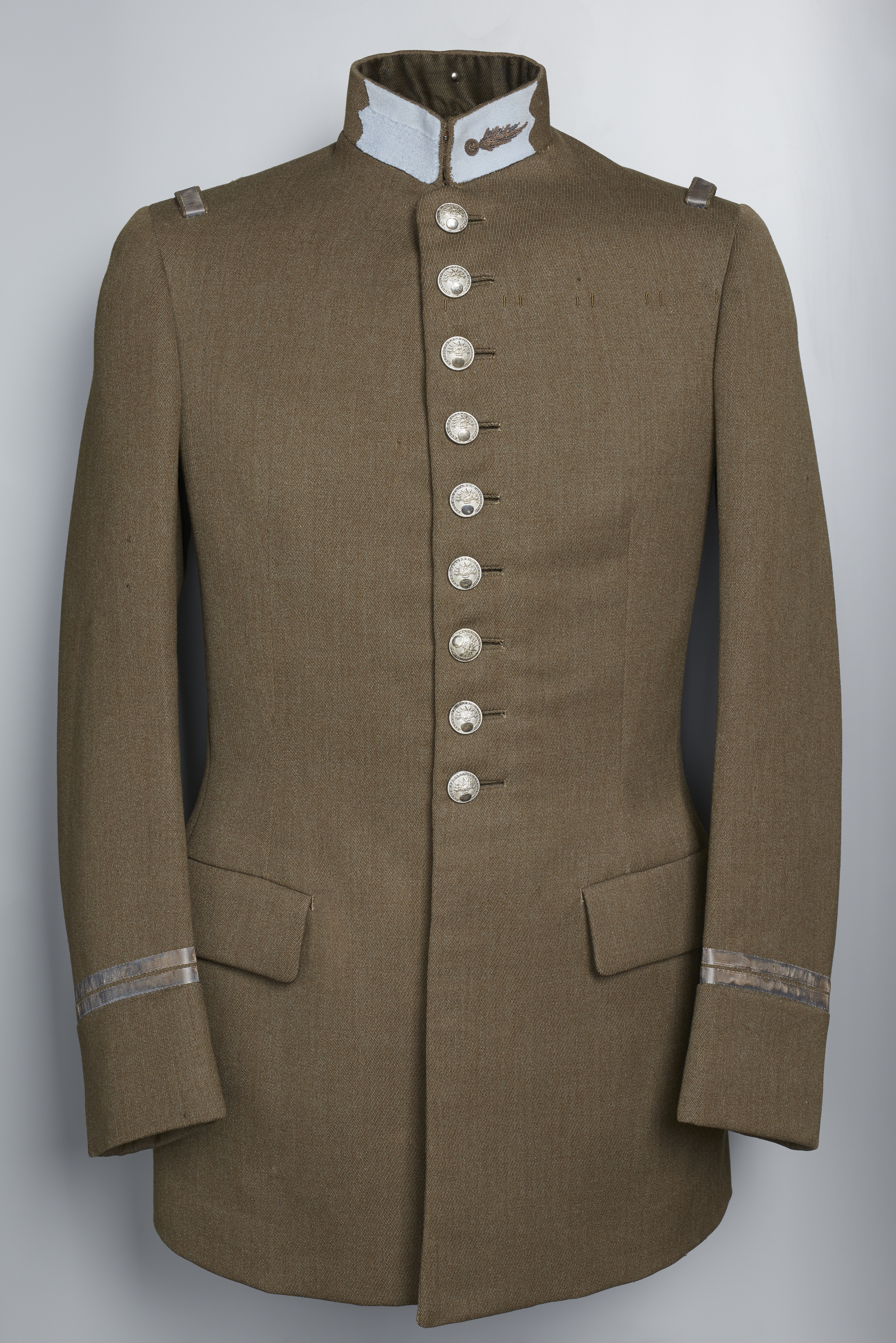
Lt. de Hauteclocque's uniform as an instructor at Saint-Cyr.

In February 1931, Hauteclocque went back to Saint-Cyr as an instructor, but wanted to return to active service. During the summer break in 1933, he flew south to Africa, where he reported to Général de brigade Henri Giraud on 11 July. Giraud sent him into the field as a liaison officer with a goum. He was awarded the croix de guerre des théâtres d'opérations extérieures for leading goumiers in an attack on caves and ravines on Bou Amdoun on 11 August. The Commander in Chief in Morocco, Général de division Antoine Huré, felt that Hauteclocque should not have been there, and held the award up for three years. Others felt differently, and Hauteclocque was given early admission to the course for promotion to capitaine. He placed fourth in the class, and was promoted on 25 December 1934. Promotion was slow in the inter-war French Army, especially in the cavalry, and he was only the second in his Saint-Cyr class to reach that rank. Most had to wait until 1936. He was also made a Chevalier de la Légion d'Honneur.

Although they were devout Catholics, Hauteclocque and Thérèse subscribed to Action Française, the journal of a far-right political organisation of the same name, despite a papal interdict against it, and continued to do so even after Thérèse was refused absolution. In contrast, his cousin Xavier de Hauteclocque was an award-winning journalist who covered the rise of the Nazi Party in Germany, visited the concentration camp at Dachau, and wrote about the Night of Long Knives. Xavier died in April 1935, convinced that he had been poisoned by the Nazis. After the Second World War, Hauteclocque destroyed his copies of Action Française.

Hauteclocque broke his leg in two places in a fall from his horse in 1936. He told his company that it was his own fault for riding on the shoulder of the road. Thereafter he frequently walked with a cane. After another mishap involving losing his way during a tactical exercise and getting stuck in a field cordoned off with barbed wire, he told them that when you have done something really stupid, it is best to admit it.

In November 1938, Hauteclocque entered the École supérieure de guerre, the French Army's staff college, as part of its 60th class. On graduating in July 1939, he was ordered to report to the 4e Division d'Infanterie (4e DI) as its chief of staff.

== Fall of France ==
On 10 May 1940, Germany invaded Luxembourg, the Netherlands, and Belgium. The 4e DI was ordered to hold the line of the Sambre river. Hauteclocque was placed in charge of three infantry battalions. To his dismay, orders came to pull back to the Canal de l'Escaut. From there the 4e DI retreated northward, becoming encircled in the Lille pocket on 28 May. Hauteclocque received permission to escape through German lines. He attempted to make his way back to the French lines by pretending to be a civilian refugee, but was apprehended by a German patrol and taken prisoner when they discovered an old military pay receipt. He was taken back to a German command post, where he secretly destroyed the receipt. He convinced a German colonel that he had been wounded in Morocco, suffered from malaria, and had six children, all of which was true, and he was thus exempted from military service, which was false. The Germans let him go. He then made his way to the Crozat Canal, swam across, and encountered a French patrol.

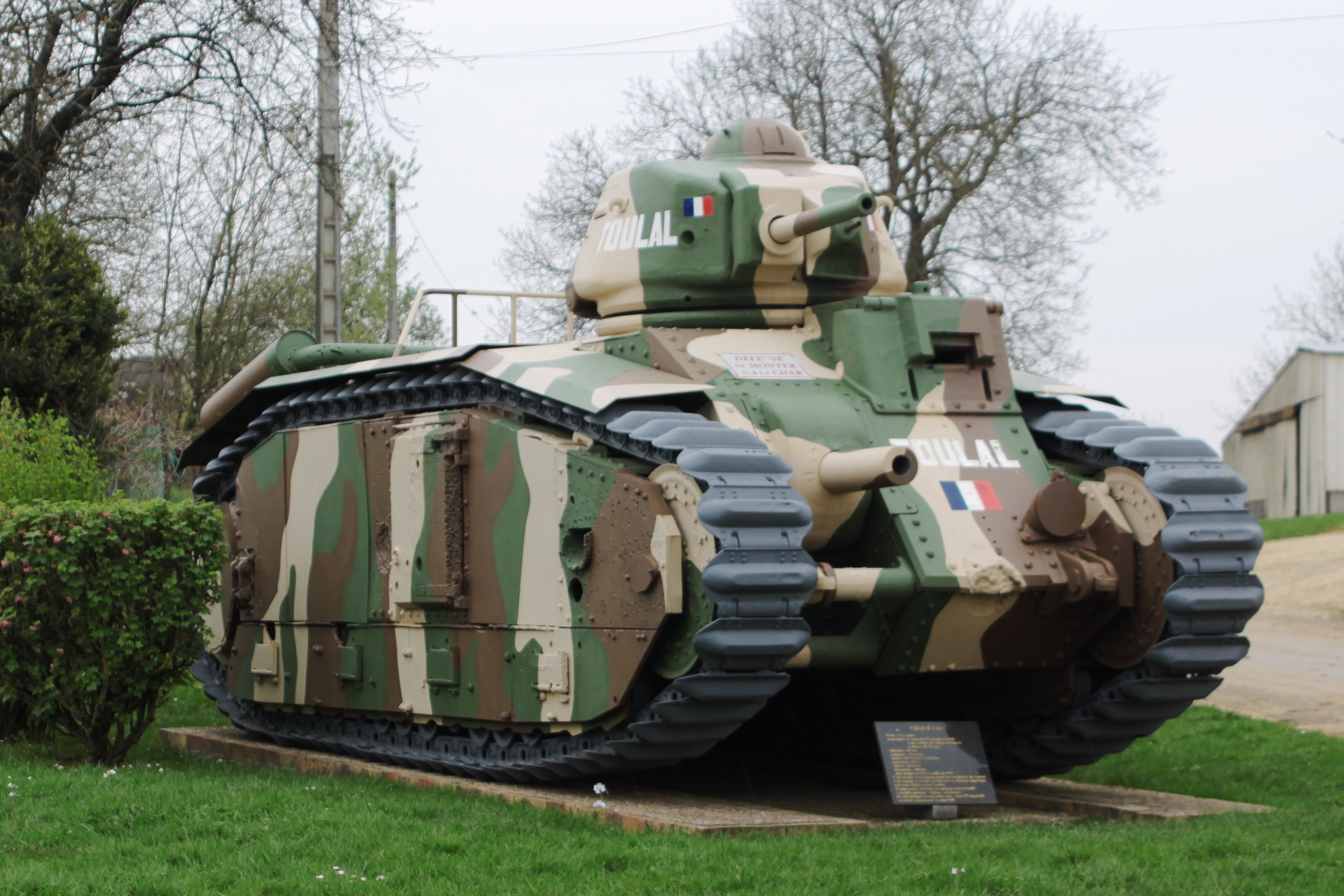
A Char B1 tank. French tanks were usually given names by their crews.

Hauteclocque reported to the headquarters of Général d'armée Aubert Frère, the commander of the Seventh Army, who gave him permission to visit his home at Tailly, which was still behind French lines. When he got there, however, he found that Thérèse had fled to Sainte-Foy-la-Grande in the southwest of France, where she had relatives. On returning to the Seventh Army, he was ordered to join the 2ème groupement cuirassé, a scratch force of armoured and mechanised units that included Brigadier General Stanisław Maczek's Polish 10th Armoured Cavalry Brigade. The groupement launched a series of counter-attacks. Lacking a radio, Hauteclocque gave directions to the Char B1 tanks with his cane. On 15 June, he was wounded in the head during a German air attack, and was taken to a hospital in a convent in Avallon. There he was again taken prisoner when the area was overrun by the Germans.

This time, Hauteclocque escaped by jumping out a window. After the armistice was signed on 22 June, French soldiers who had not been captured were simply allowed to go home, and the Germans were friendly towards Hauteclocque, especially when they discovered that he spoke fluent German. He made his way to rejoin his family by car and bicycle. So that he could cross from the zone occupée into the zone libre where Thérèse and the children were, his sister Yvonne obtained an identity card for him in the name of "Leclerc". It was his first use of this name. He also told Yvonne that he intended to join Général de brigade Charles de Gaulle in Britain. He was reunited with his family in Saint-Germain-les-Vergnes on 30 June but stayed with them for only four days before setting out for Spain. He managed to obtain a visa on the second attempt, being refused the first time for carrying too much money with him. Once in Spain he took a train to Madrid, and then to Lisbon, where he went to the British embassy, which arranged his passage to Britain on a merchant ship, the SS Hillary.

== Africa ==
Leclerc arrived in London on 25 July 1940, and met with de Gaulle, who announced that he was promoting him to Chef d'escadrons (major). He also encountered his cousin Pierre de Hauteclocque, Xavier's brother, who was serving with the 13e Demi-Brigade de Légion Étrangère (13e DBLE, an infantry regiment of the French Foreign Legion). This was the largest unit that had joined the Free French Forces. After participating in the Battles of Narvik, it had found itself in Britain when France surrendered. Formed after the war began, it contained many men who had fought for the Republican cause in the Spanish Civil War, and many refugees from Nazi and Fascist countries. Leclerc then offered his own services to the unit, but its commander, Colonel Raoul Magrin-Vernerey, rejected his offer on the grounds that he was high-born, over-qualified and a cavalryman.

Instead, in August 1940, de Gaulle ordered Leclerc to French Equatorial Africa, where the local leaders had declared themselves for Free France, as the governor of French Cameroon. At this time he adopted Leclerc as his nom de guerre, so that Thérèse and their children would not be put at risk if his name appeared in the papers. He quickly secured the Free French grip on Cameroon. He then led a force consisting of the 13e DBLE and Senegalese Tirailleurs against Gabon, whose local leader supported Vichy France. The Battle of Gabon lasted from 12 October to 12 November 1940, and ended with 20 dead and Gabon in Free French hands. Vichy prisoners were held as hostages in case Vichy France tried to retaliate against the families of Free Frenchmen. When Louis-Michel-François Tardy, the Bishop of Libreville, refused to conduct a mass to celebrate the victory, Leclerc had him arrested. Capitaine de corvette Georges Thierry d'Argenlieu conducted the service in his capacity as a Carmelite priest.

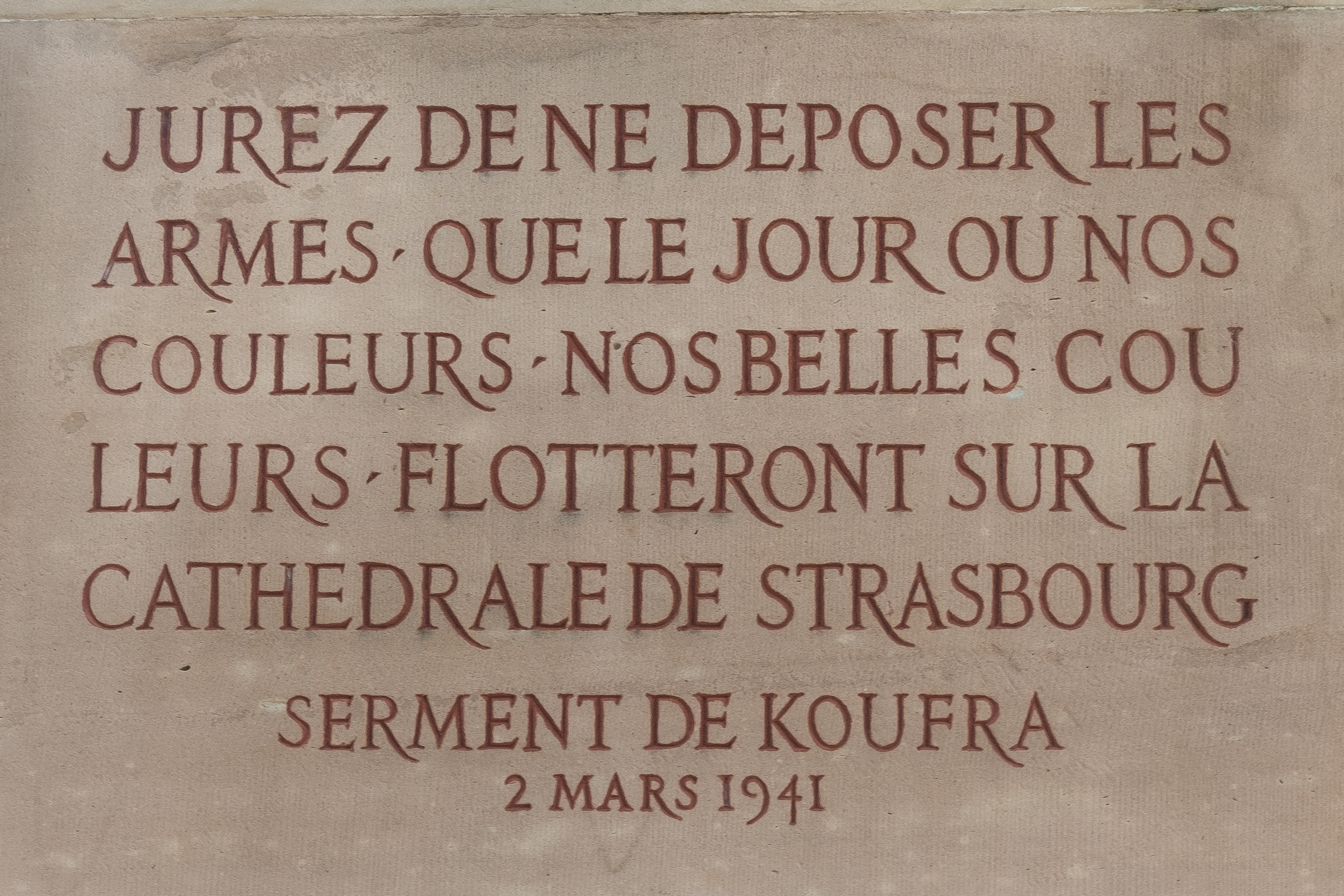
Serment de Koufra, plaque in Strasbourg

With Gabon in hand, de Gaulle sent Leclerc to Chad, the only Free French territory that shared a border with territory controlled by Axis powers, along its Sahara Desert border with Italian-controlled Libya. Leclerc's attention was drawn to two Italian outposts in the desert, Murzuk in southwestern Libya and Kufra in the southeast. Both were over 1,000 miles (1,600 km) from his base at Fort Lamy in Chad. He started with a small raid on Murzuk by eleven men of the Régiment de Tirailleurs Sénégalais du Tchad (RTST) and two troops of the British Long Range Desert Group (LRDG) on 11 January 1941. In February, he led a much larger operation that captured Kufra. After the battle, he had his men swear an oath known today as the Serment de Koufra ("Oath of Kufra"):

You shall not lay down arms, until the day when our colours, our beautiful colours, flutter over Strasbourg Cathedral.

Leclerc learnt a great deal about how to handle and supply a force advancing across the desert, and was rewarded with the British Distinguished Service Order. He began planning a far more ambitious advance into Libya. This was delayed by a year due to Generalfeldmarschall Erwin Rommel's defeat of the British Eighth Army in the Battle of Gazala, and the subsequent German and Italian advance into Egypt. Leclerc was promoted to Général de brigade in August 1941, and pinned two metal stars captured from the Italians on his kepi.

De Gaulle ordered the plan for an advance into Libya to be put in motion in the wake of the Eighth Army's victory in the Second Battle of El Alamein in November 1942. Leclerc set out from Fort Lamy on 16 December 1942 with 500 European and 2,700 African troops in 350 vehicles. He captured Sebha on 12 January 1943, and Mizdah on 22 January. He reached Tripoli on 26 January, where he was greeted by the Eighth Army's commander, General Bernard Montgomery. Leclerc's command, now reinforced by the Greek Sacred Squadron, and known as L Force, covered the Eighth Army's inland flank during its advance into Tunisia. L Force beat off a German counterattack on 10 March, and participated in the attack on the Mareth Line.

== Western Europe ==
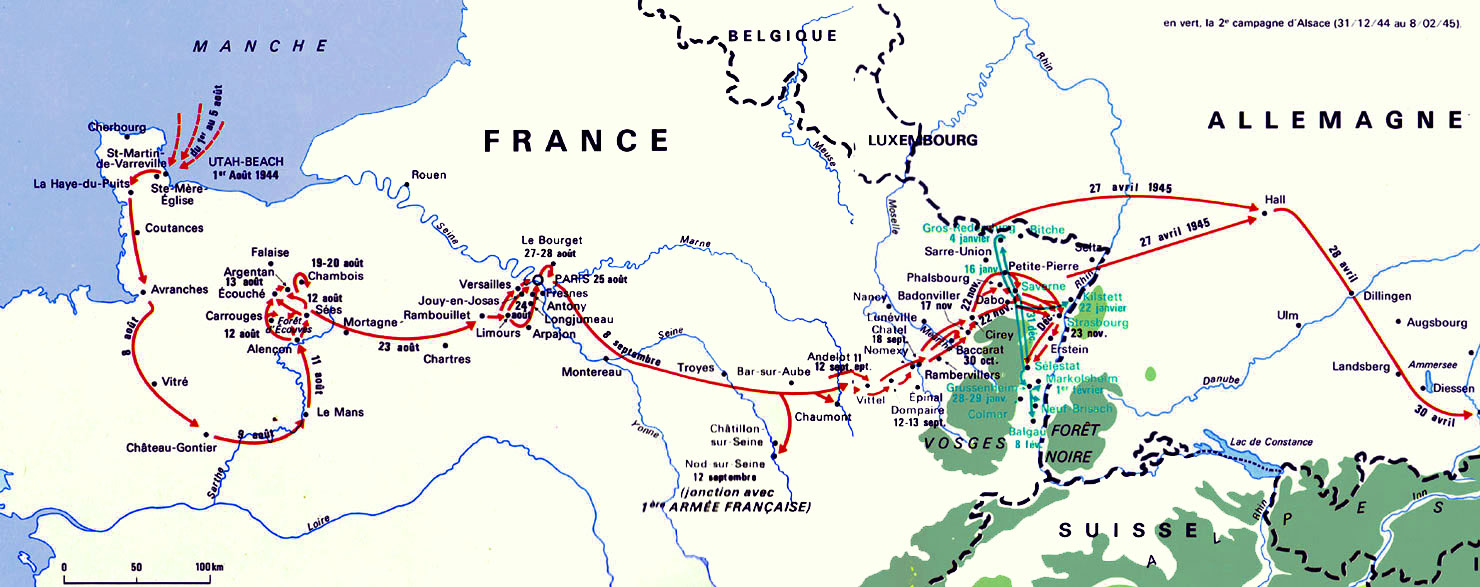
Route of the 2e Division Blindée 1944-45

After the fighting in North Africa ended, Leclerc's L Force, now about 4,000 strong, became the 2e Division Française Libre (2e DFL). In June 1943, de Gaulle informed him the 2e DFL would be re-equipped by the Americans as an armoured division, the 2e Division Blindée (2^{e} DB). It was often called La Division Leclerc. Although organised along American lines, its units had French titles. The non-white units were transferred elsewhere. The remainder of 2e DFL became the Régiment de marche du Tchad (RMT), 2e DB's motorised infantry regiment. Free French armoured units serving with the Eighth Army became the 501e Régiment de chars de combat (501^{e} RCC). The artillery and the other two armoured regiments of 2e DB, the 12e Régiment de Cuirassiers (12e RC) and the 12e Régiment de Chasseurs d'Afrique (12e RCA), were drawn from the Vichy Armée d'Afrique. Perhaps the most unusual unit in the division was the Régiment Blindé de Fusiliers-Marins (RBFM), sailors who served as a tank destroyer regiment. Leclerc had to weld the various units, some of whom had recently been fighting against the Allies, into a team. This was no easy task. When two men from the 501e RCC upset a former Vichy officer by singing a disrespectful song about Général d'armée Henri Giraud, resulting in a fight, he told the officer concerned that respect had to be earned.

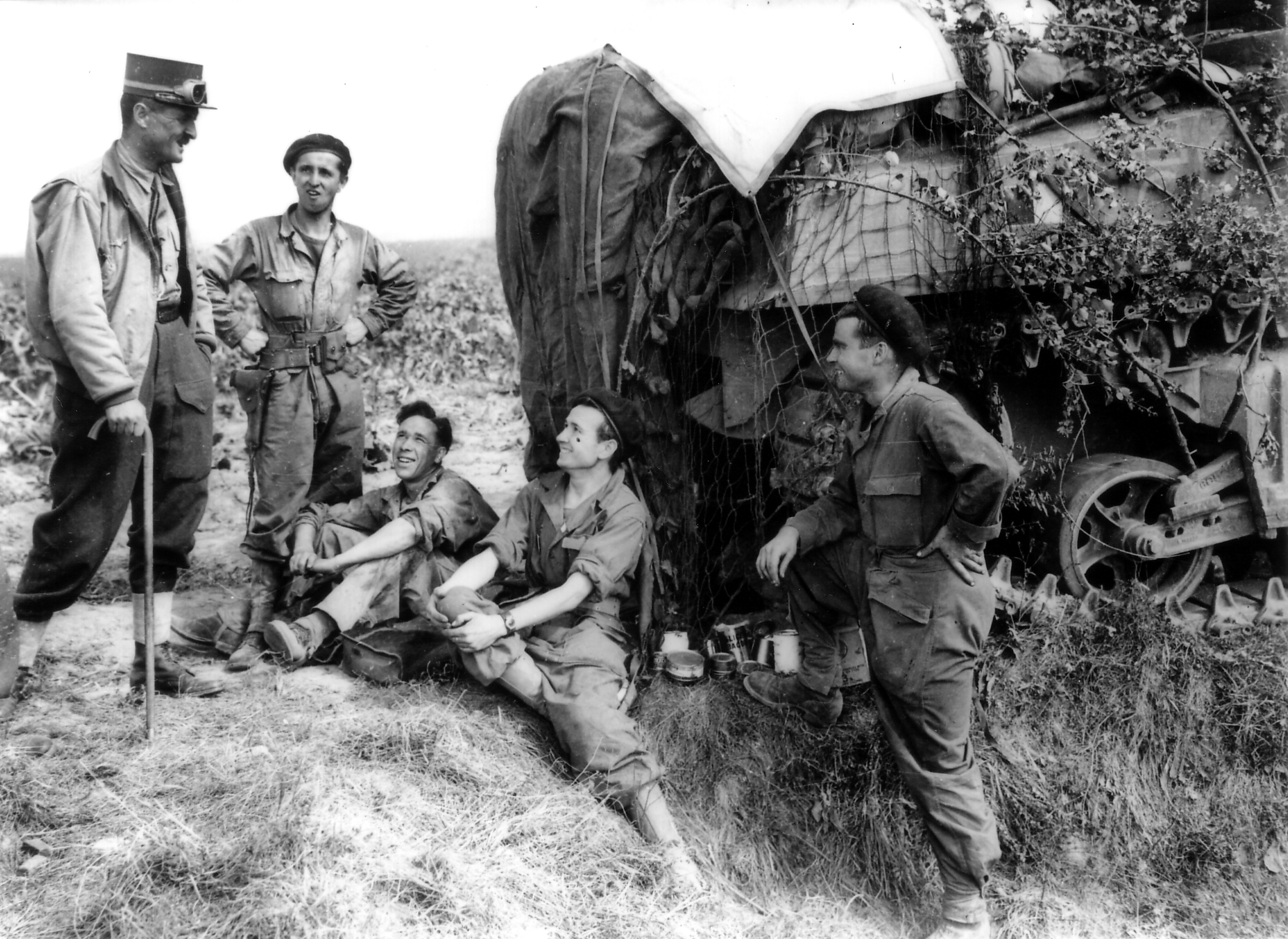
General Leclerc talks to his men from the 501e RCC

In April 1944, 2e DB was shipped to Britain to participate in Operation Overlord, the Allied invasion of northern France. Leclerc and his staff travelled by air in a converted B-24 Liberator bomber. The division moved to training areas in Yorkshire, where Leclerc established his headquarters on the estate of Henry Frederick Hotham, 7th Baron Hotham, at Dalton Hall, Beverley. Training was conducted in concert with Maczek's 1st Polish Armoured Division.

On 1 August 1944, 2e DB landed at Utah Beach in Normandy as part of Major General Wade Haislip's United States XV Corps of Lieutenant General George S. Patton, Jr.'s United States Third Army. Both of these American generals spoke French fluently. Later that month, 2e DB participated in the Battle of the Falaise Pocket, which inflicted a major defeat on the German Army. Like most new division commanders, Leclerc also made errors, in his case by allowing 2e DB to use roads that had been earmarked for American units, thereby causing traffic jams and holding up the American advance.

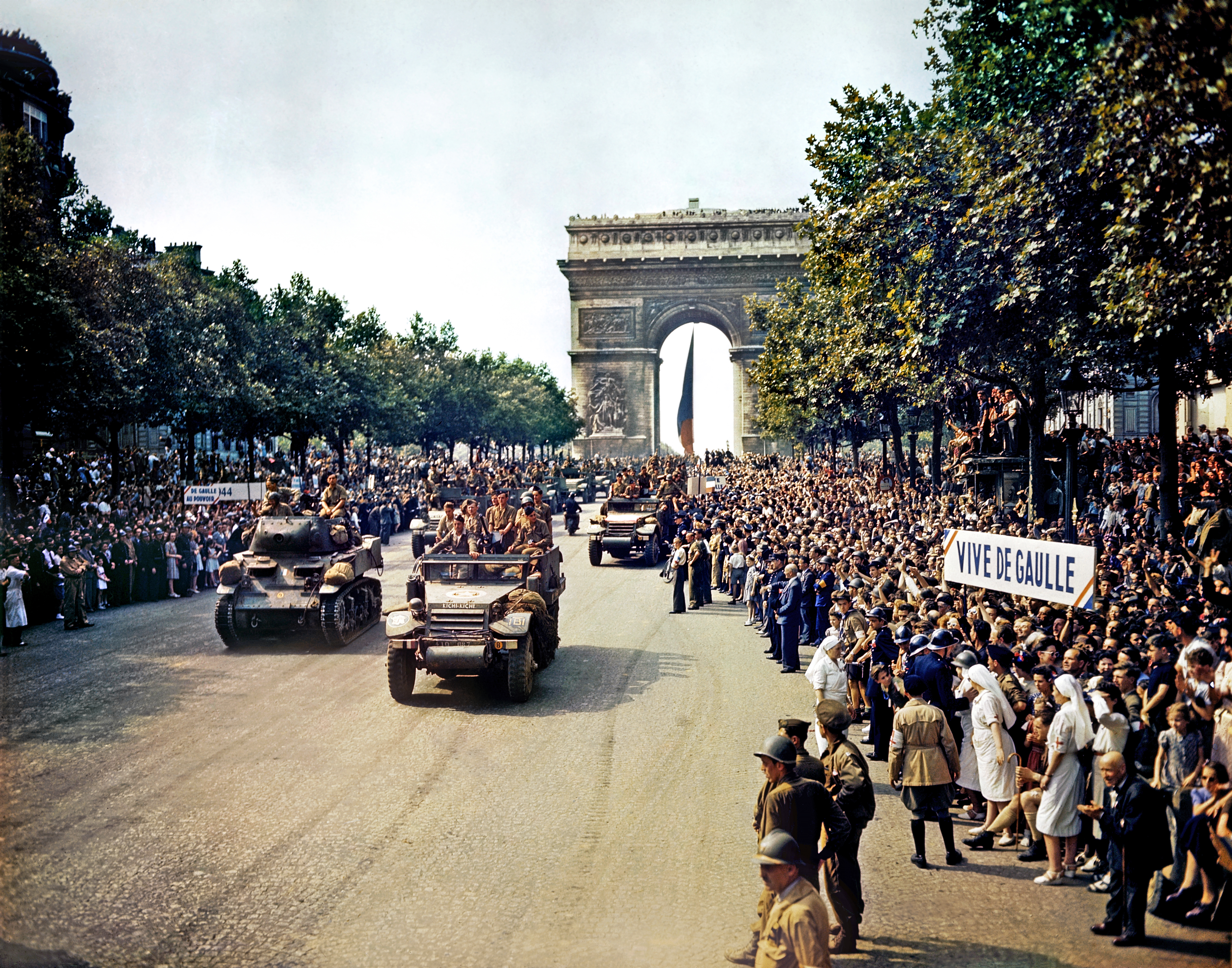
Crowds of French patriots line the Champs Elysees to view Free French tanks and half tracks of Leclerc's 2e DB pass through the Arc du Triomphe on 26 August 1944, after Paris was liberated.

The next assignment for 2e DB, and the one that it had been brought from Africa for, was the liberation of Paris. Allied troops initially avoided the historic city, moving around it to minimise the danger of destruction if the Germans sought to defend it. When Parisians rose against the Germans, de Gaulle and Leclerc persuaded General Dwight D. Eisenhower to help. Leclerc's men had to fight their way into Paris, and when they got there they found German infantry and tanks still holding parts of the city. The German commander, General der Infanterie Dietrich von Choltitz, was inclined to surrender, and did so to Leclerc and Henri Rol-Tanguy of the French Forces of the Interior at the Gare Montparnasse on 25 August 1944. Leclerc arranged for Ensign Philippe de Gaulle, who was serving in the RBFM, to be in attendance, but the elder de Gaulle was annoyed that Leclerc had allowed the communist Rol to co-sign the surrender. The next day de Gaulle held a triumphal parade, accompanied by senior military figures including Leclerc, Alphonse Juin, Marie-Pierre Kœnig and Georges Thierry d'Argenlieu.

Montgomery's troops liberated Tailly, allowing Leclerc to return home to see Thérèse and the children again on 6 September 1944. His oldest sons, Henri and Hubert, now 18 and 17 years old respectively, lied about their ages to volunteer for service with 2e DB. Henri went on to serve with the RMT, while Hubert became a Sherman tank gunner with the 12e RCA. Other relatives also served with the division, including two nephews. The fighting in Paris cost 2e DB 97 killed and 238 wounded; nearly twice that number were lost in the fighting in surrounding areas. These were replaced by men and women who, like Leclerc's sons, offered themselves at a recruitment office the 2e DB established near the Bois de Boulogne.

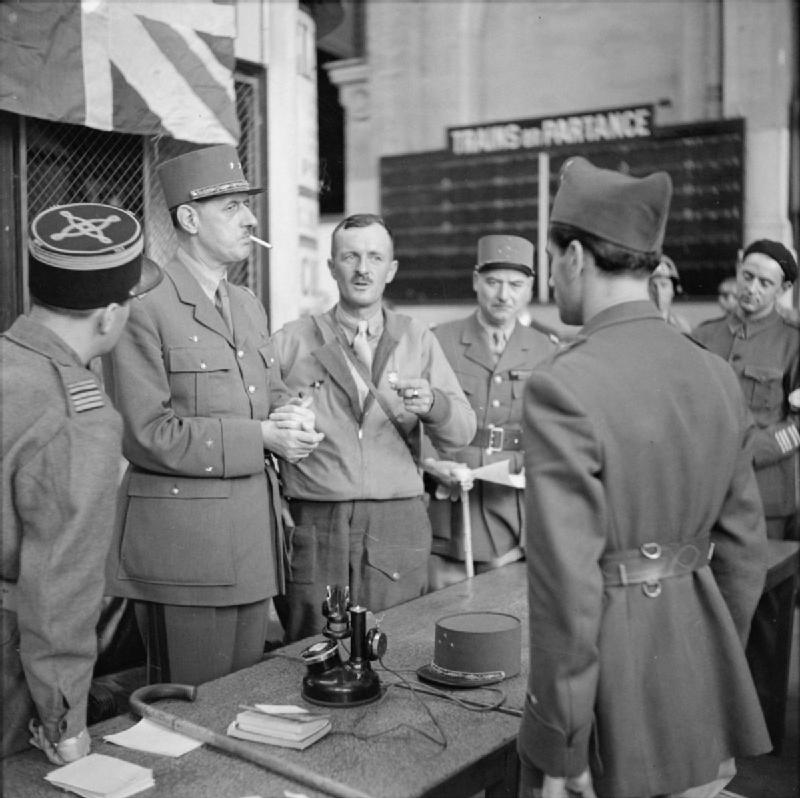
General de Gaulle with Leclerc (centre) and other French officers at Montparnasse railway station in Paris, 25 August 1944

After Paris, 2e DB returned to XV Corps at Leclerc's request. He won a notable victory on 12–16 September 1944 at the Battle of Dompaire against the Panzer IVs and Panther tanks of the German 112th Panzer Brigade by using manoeuvre and air power to compensate for the numerical and technical inferiority of his tanks. American historian Hugh M. Cole wrote that "this fight, characterised warmly by the XV Corps commander as a 'brilliant example' of perfect air-ground co-ordination, not only was an outstanding feat of arms but also dealt a crippling blow to Hitler's plans for an armoured thrust into the Third Army flank."

Patton personally pinned a Silver Star on Leclerc, and brought with him another six Silver Stars and 25 Bronze Star Medals for other members of the 2e DB. Patton then gave Leclerc his next objective: the town of Baccarat and the bridge there over the Meurthe River. The bridge was captured before the Germans could destroy it. Haislip's XV Corps was transferred to the Seventh United States Army on 29 September, and Leclerc feared that 2e DB would be transferred to Général d'armée Jean de Lattre de Tassigny's French First Army. Leclerc regarded the First Army as being full of traitors who had supported Vichy France. Moreover, de Lattre had sacked Général de division Edgard de Larminat for Gaullist sentiments, and Leclerc had good reason to fear that he might meet a similar fate.

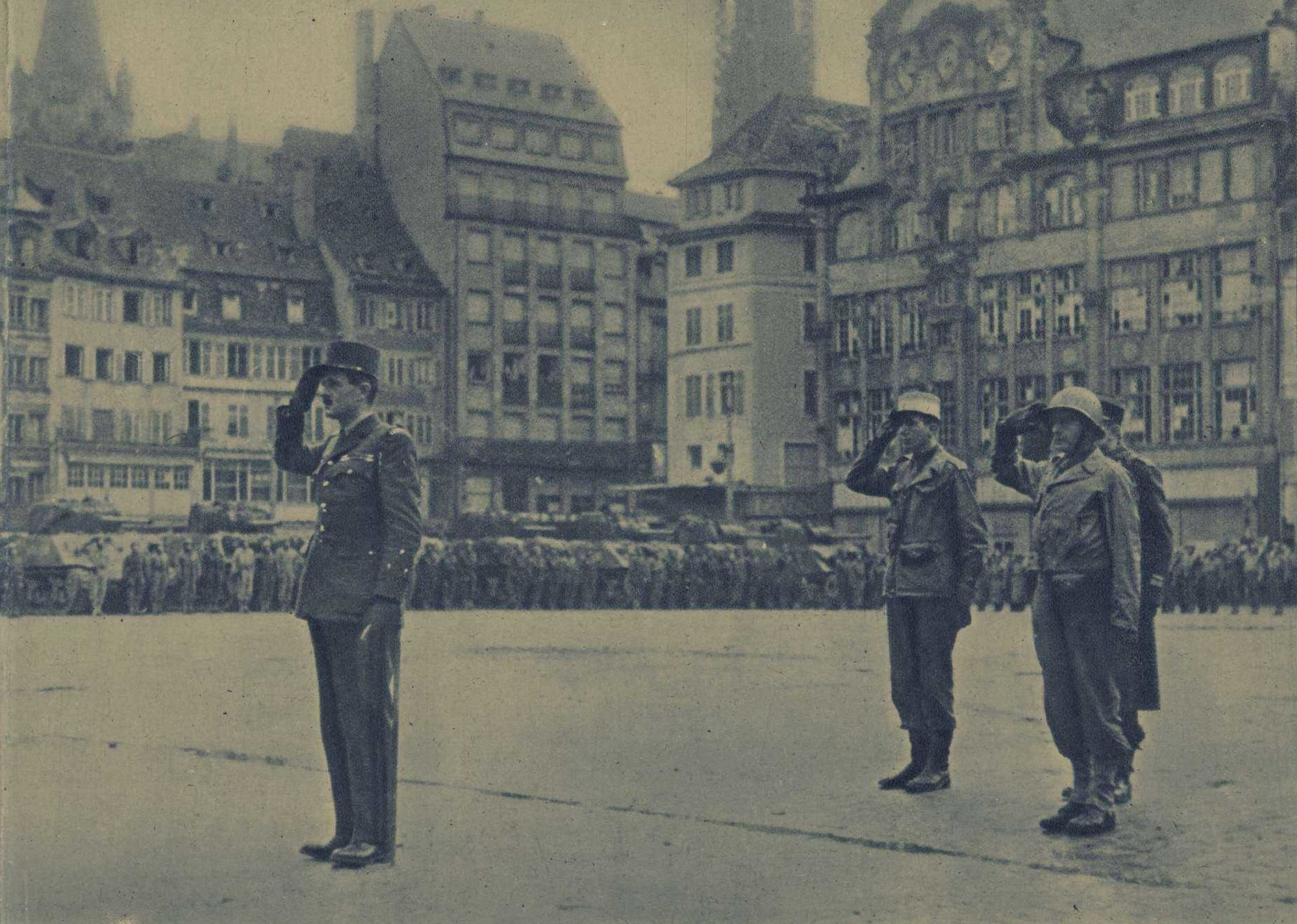
General Leclerc (left) reviewing his troops on Place Kléber after the liberation of Strasbourg

On 22 November, Haislip gave Leclerc permission to advance on Strasbourg. Leclerc surprised the Germans by advancing over country roads and tracks to bypass their defences. Strasbourg was reached on 25 November, and that afternoon the Tricolour flew over the Strasbourg Cathedral. The German offensive in the Ardennes in December and in Alsace in January led Eisenhower to consider abandoning Strasbourg, but strong opposition to the idea from the French caused him to back down. As a result, the 2e DB was transferred to de Lattre's command to assist in the reduction of the Colmar Pocket.

Leclerc objected to the use of his troops in the attack on Royan in April 1945. As a result, only part of 2e DB was employed. The division rejoined Seventh Army, crossing the Rhine on 25 April, and joining the pursuit into Bavaria. Leclerc visited Dachau concentration camp after its liberation by the Americans. In an incident that took place on 8 May 1945 at Karlstein near Bad Reichenhall in Bavaria, he was presented with a defiant group of a dozen captured Frenchmen of the SS Charlemagne Division. He asked them why they wore a German uniform, to which one of them replied by asking why Leclerc wore an American one. Leclerc told his men to get rid of them. That was taken as a death sentence. The group of French Waffen-SS men was summarily executed by the RMT without any form of military tribunal procedure, and their bodies left where they fell until an American burial team collected them three days later. On 2 June 1949 the bodies were exhumed and buried in the St. Zeno cemetery in Bad Reichenhall.

For his services leading the 2e DB, Leclerc was awarded the Grand Cross of the Legion of Honour.

== South East Asia ==
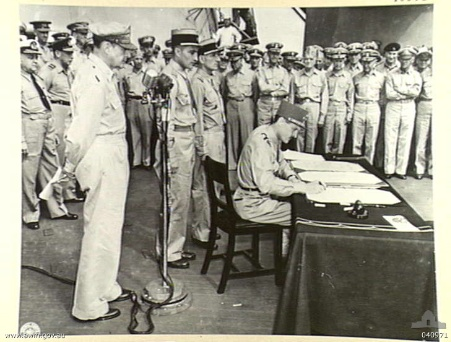
Tokyo Bay, Japan. Surrender of the Japanese aboard USS Missouri (BB-63). Leclerc representing France signs the instrument of surrender. Other French representatives stand behind him while General Douglas MacArthur, Supreme Allied Commander, stands at the microphone.

At the end of the Second World War in Europe in May 1945, Leclerc received command of the French Far East Expeditionary Corps (Corps expéditionnaire français en Extrême-Orient, CEFEO). He represented France at the surrender of the Japanese Empire in Tokyo Bay on 2 September 1945. On 28 November 1945, he legally changed his name to Jacques-Philippe Leclerc de Hauteclocque, incorporating his Free French pseudonym.

Although he had never before served in the Far East, as CEFEO commander, Leclerc was charged with recovering French Indochina. This territory, comprising the present day states of Vietnam, Cambodia and Laos, had been conquered by the French during the late 19th and early 20th centuries. The Vichy regime had allowed the Japanese to use Indochina as a base from which to attack the Allies in Malaya, Burma and China. On 9 March 1945, the Japanese had deposed the French colonial government, taken direct control of Indochina, defeated the French army in several engagements, and imprisoned surviving French soldiers.

With the end of the war, Indochina was divided in two, with the area north of the 16th parallel occupied by 150,000 Nationalist Chinese troops, while the part to the south was occupied by 20,000 British and Indian troops of Major General Douglas Gracey's 20th Indian Infantry Division. Meanwhile, the Vietnamese revolutionary Ho Chi Minh had declared Vietnamese independence. Leclerc arrived in Saigon with a first contingent of French soldiers on 5 October 1945. He was dependent on the British for equipment and shipping. He did not get along well with D'Argenlieu, whom de Gaulle had appointed French High Commissioner for Indochina.

Leclerc heeded the advice he was given by United States General of the Army Douglas MacArthur to bring as many soldiers as possible. He broke the Vietminh blockade around Saigon, then drove through the Mekong delta and up into the Central Highlands. This was possible because Ho feared Chinese domination far more than French colonialism, which he perceived to be in decline. Ho's first priority was getting rid of the Chinese, and for this he needed French help. Leclerc quickly perceived the necessity for a political solution to the conflict.

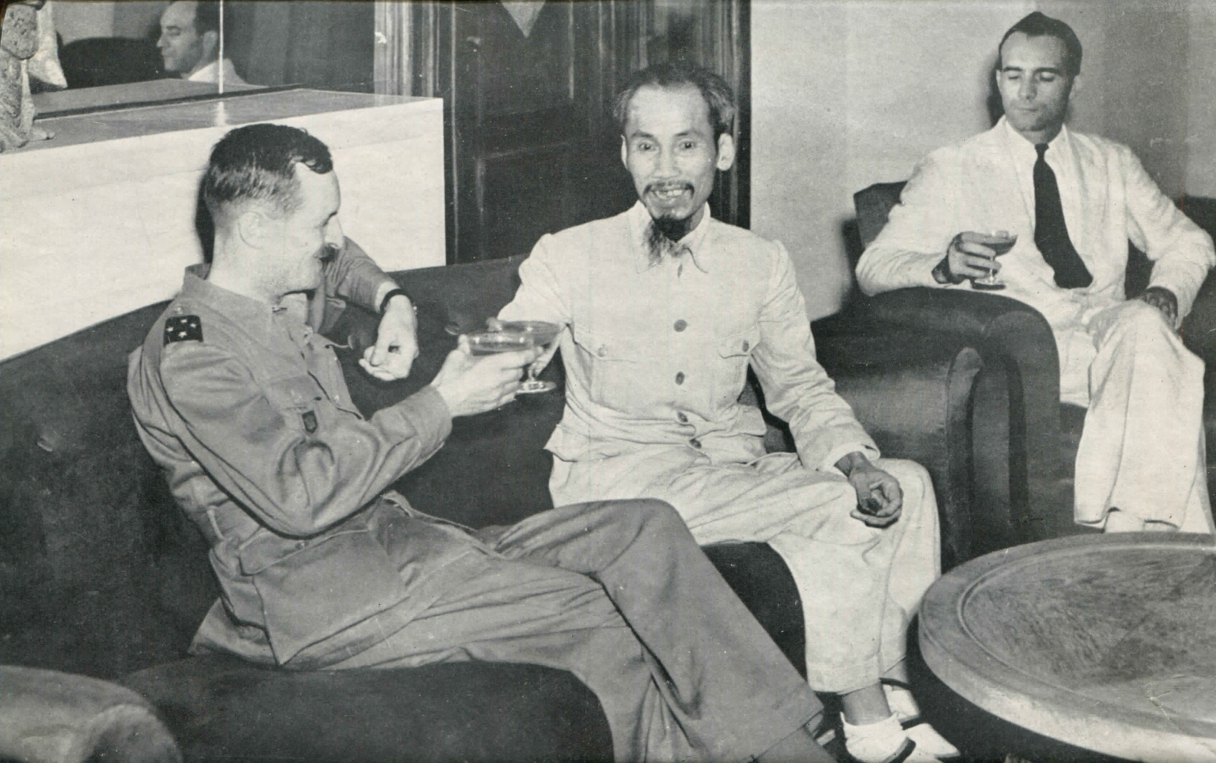
Leclerc (left) meeting with Ho Chi Minh (centre) in the presence of Jean Sainteny (right) in Hanoi, March 1946

The French government negotiator Jean Sainteny flew to Saigon to consult Leclerc, who was acting as high commissioner in the absence of d'Argenlieu. Leclerc approved Sainteny's proposal to negotiate with Ho because he preferred a diplomatic solution to a larger conflict, but he still dispatched a flotilla with shiploads of French soldiers to northern Vietnam ready to attack if the talks failed. At that time, Ho felt that negotiations with the French constituted his best option because the Soviet Union had not yet endorsed the Vietminh or the Vietnamese nationalist party (VNQDD), and the French Communist Party chose to support French rule in Vietnam.

On 6 March 1946, a tentative agreement was reached at the last minute (with Leclerc's fleet already in the Gulf of Tonkin) between Sainteny and Ho. The agreement stated that France would recognise Vietnam as a free state within the French Union, a new name for the French empire broadly similar to the British Commonwealth, and that Ho would allow France to base 25,000 soldiers in Vietnam for five years. The Ho-Sainteny agreement was never confirmed because it disappointed people on both sides. Ho's immense prestige largely silenced Vietnamese dissent, but the agreement caused a serious split within the French side. French businessmen, planters, and officials in Saigon were "indignant at the prospect of losing their colonial privileges." Leclerc led his troops into Hanoi on 18 March 1946.

D'Argenlieu bluntly denounced Leclerc. "I am amazed – yes, that is the word, amazed", he said, "that France's fine expeditionary corps in Indochina is commanded by officers who would rather negotiate than fight". D'Argenlieu stated that a higher level meeting in Paris would be required. He then unilaterally declared a French-controlled Autonomous Republic of Cochinchina without asking either Paris or the Vietnamese. In July 1946, Leclerc was replaced as commander of the French forces by Jean-Étienne Valluy. At the time many French and American politicians were willing to believe that Ho was part of a Soviet plan to dominate the world, but Leclerc warned that "anti-communism will be a useless tool unless the problem of nationalism is resolved." His advice was simple: "Negotiate at all costs!"

== Death ==
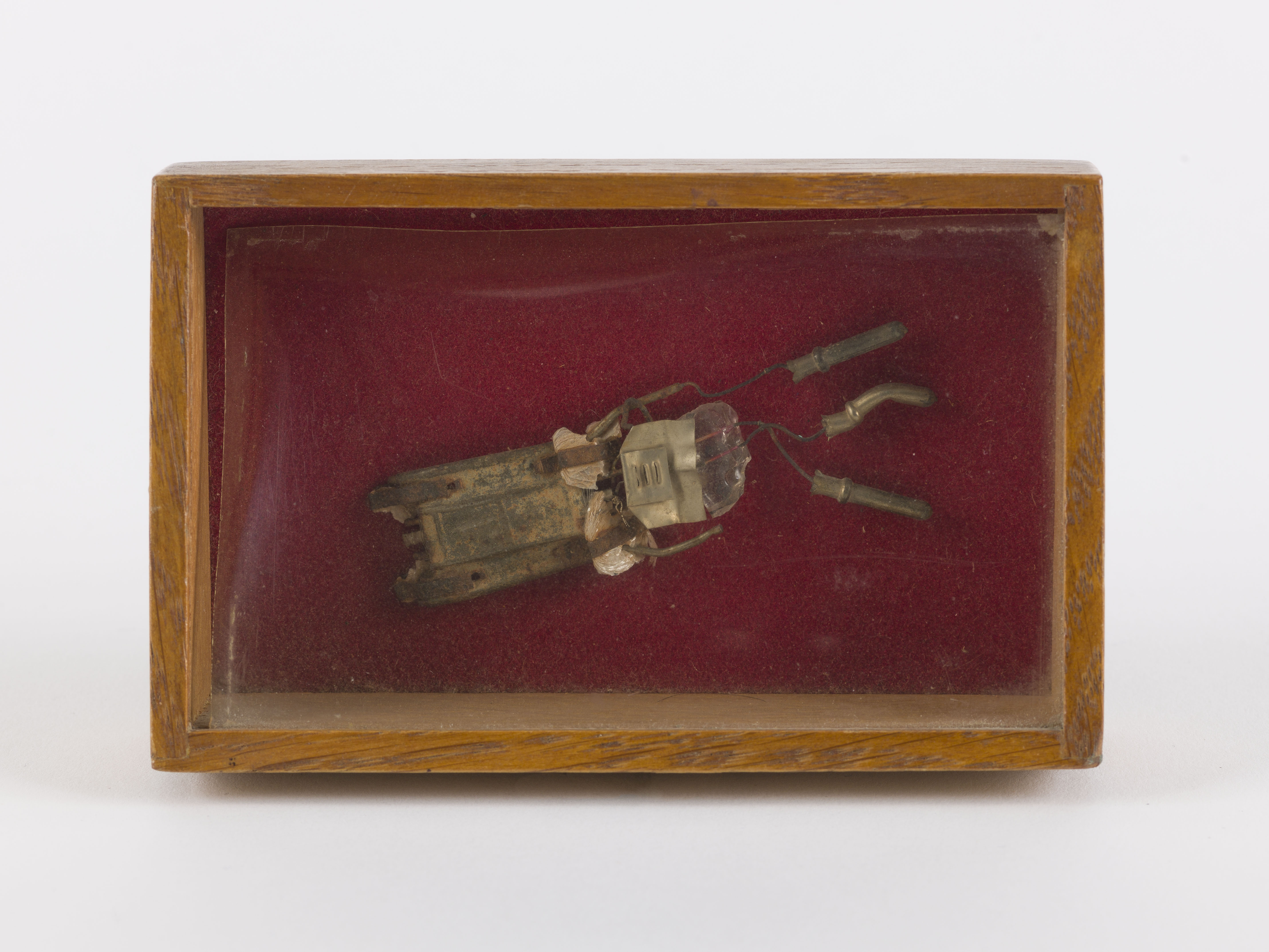
Fragment of a lamp from the crash of Leclerc's B-25 Mitchell

Leclerc was appointed Inspector of Land Forces in North Africa. On 28 November 1947, his North American B-25 Mitchell, Tailly II, carrying Leclerc and his staff, crashed near Colomb-Béchar in French Algeria, killing everyone on board. His body was returned to France, where it was taken to Paris along the route that 2e DB had followed in August 1944. A funeral service was held at Notre Dame de Paris, and he was interred in a crypt at Les Invalides.

== Posthumous honours ==
Leclerc was posthumously created a Marshal of France on 23 August 1952, the anniversary of the day that 2e DB had entered Paris. Today his marshal's baton is displayed in the Leclerc room of the Musée de l'Armée at Invalides, as is his battered képi with the Italian stars that he wore at Kufra.

The Leclerc tank built by GIAT Industries (Groupement Industriel des Armements Terrestres) of France is named after him. There is a monument to Leclerc in the Petit-Montrouge quarter of the 14th arrondissement in Paris, between Avenue de la Porte d'Orléans and Rue de la Légion Étrangère, and near the Square du Serment-de-Koufra. Two streets in Paris are named for him: Avenue du Général Leclerc in the 14th arrondissement and Rue du Maréchal Leclerc in the 12th arrondissement, between the Bois de Vincennes and the Marne River.

Memorials to Leclerc

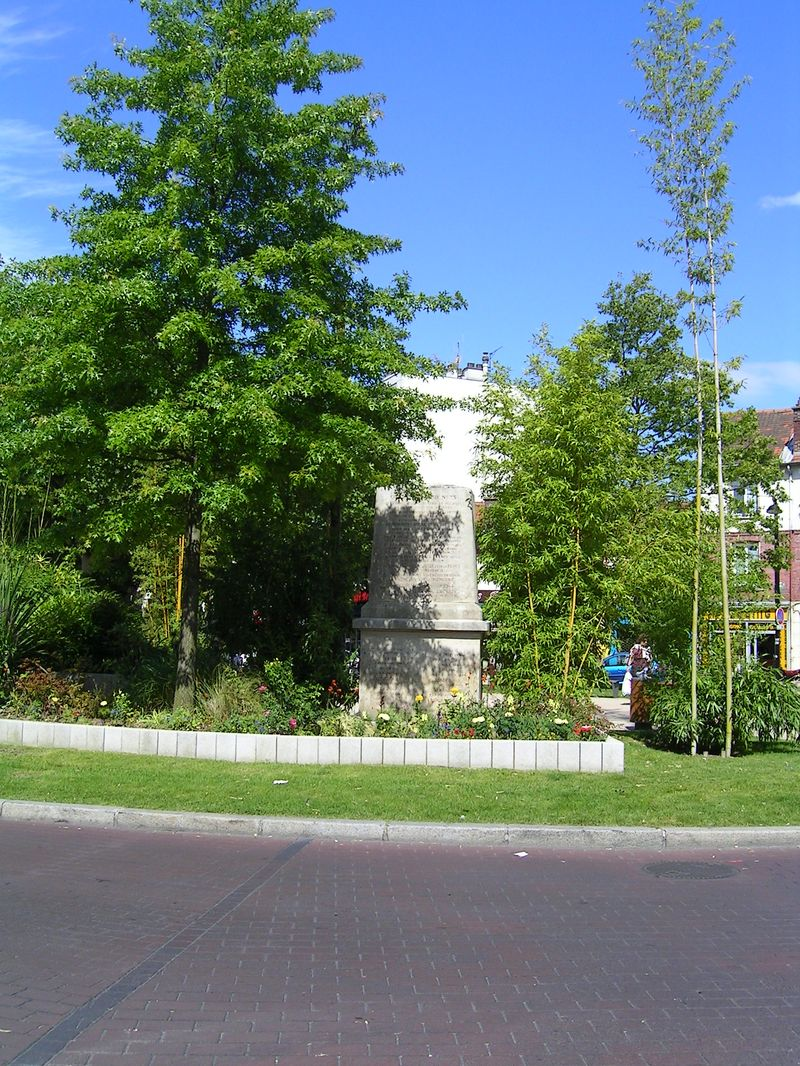
Monument in Aulnay-sous-Bois

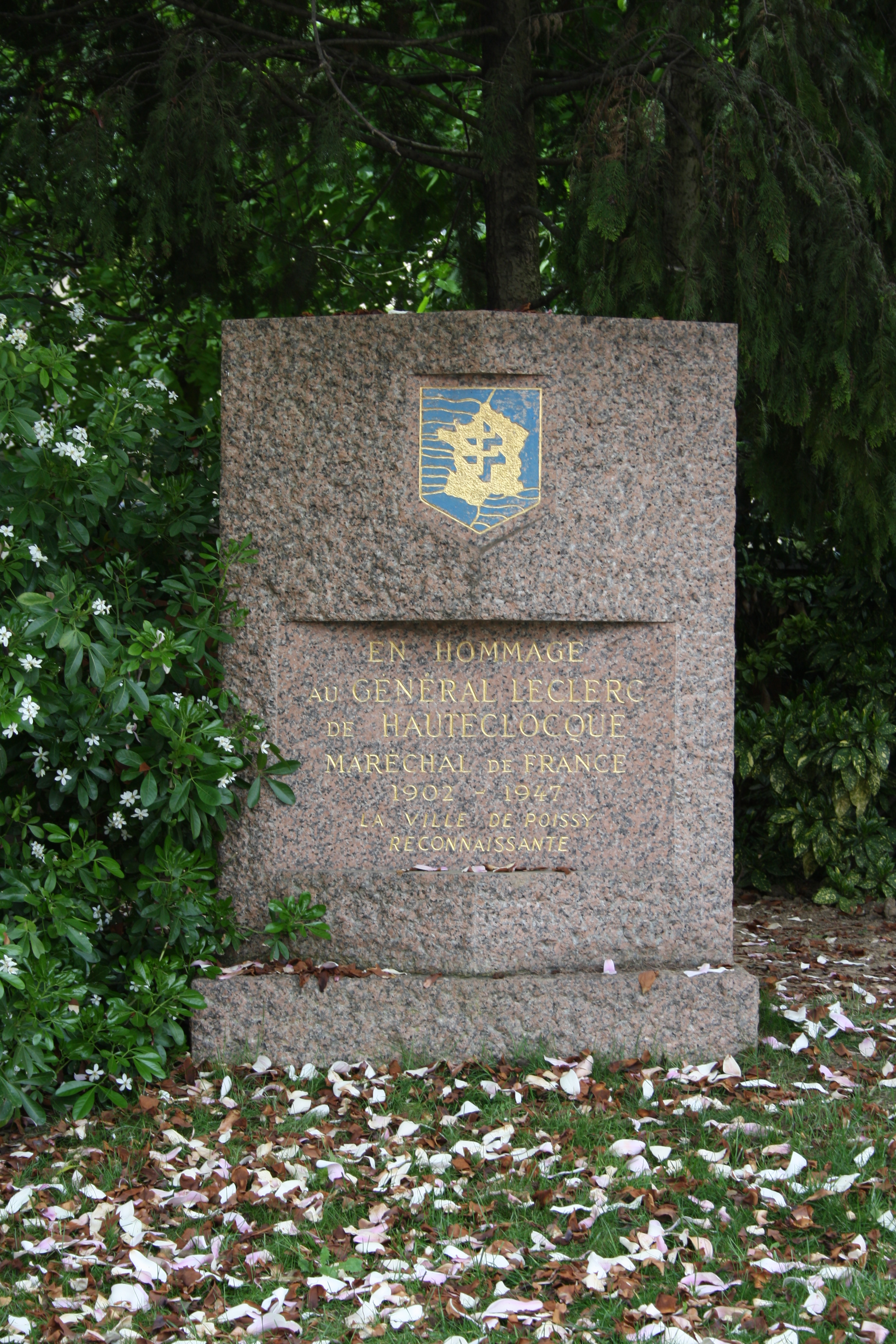
Monument in Poissy

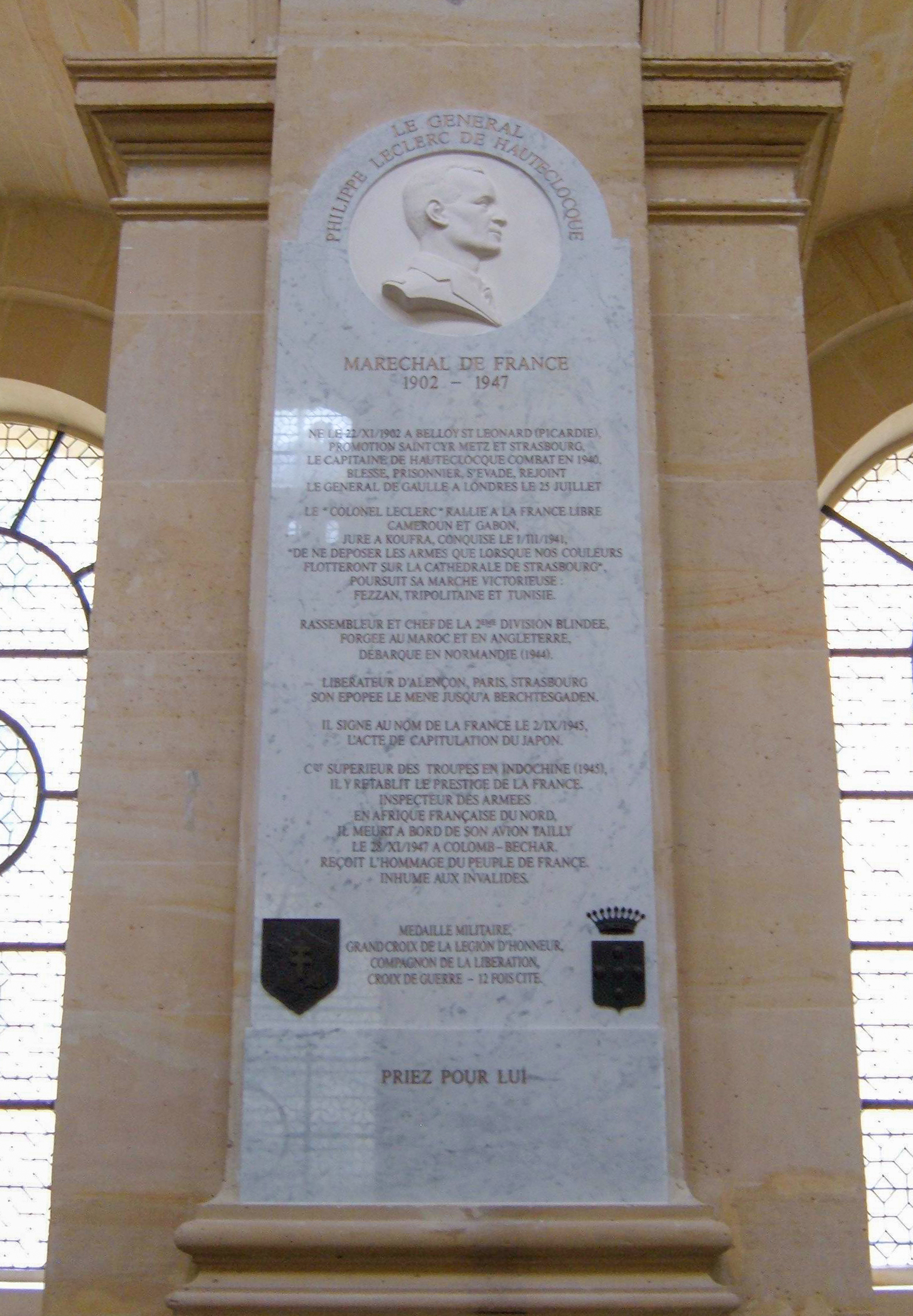
Memorial plaque in Les Invalides, in Paris

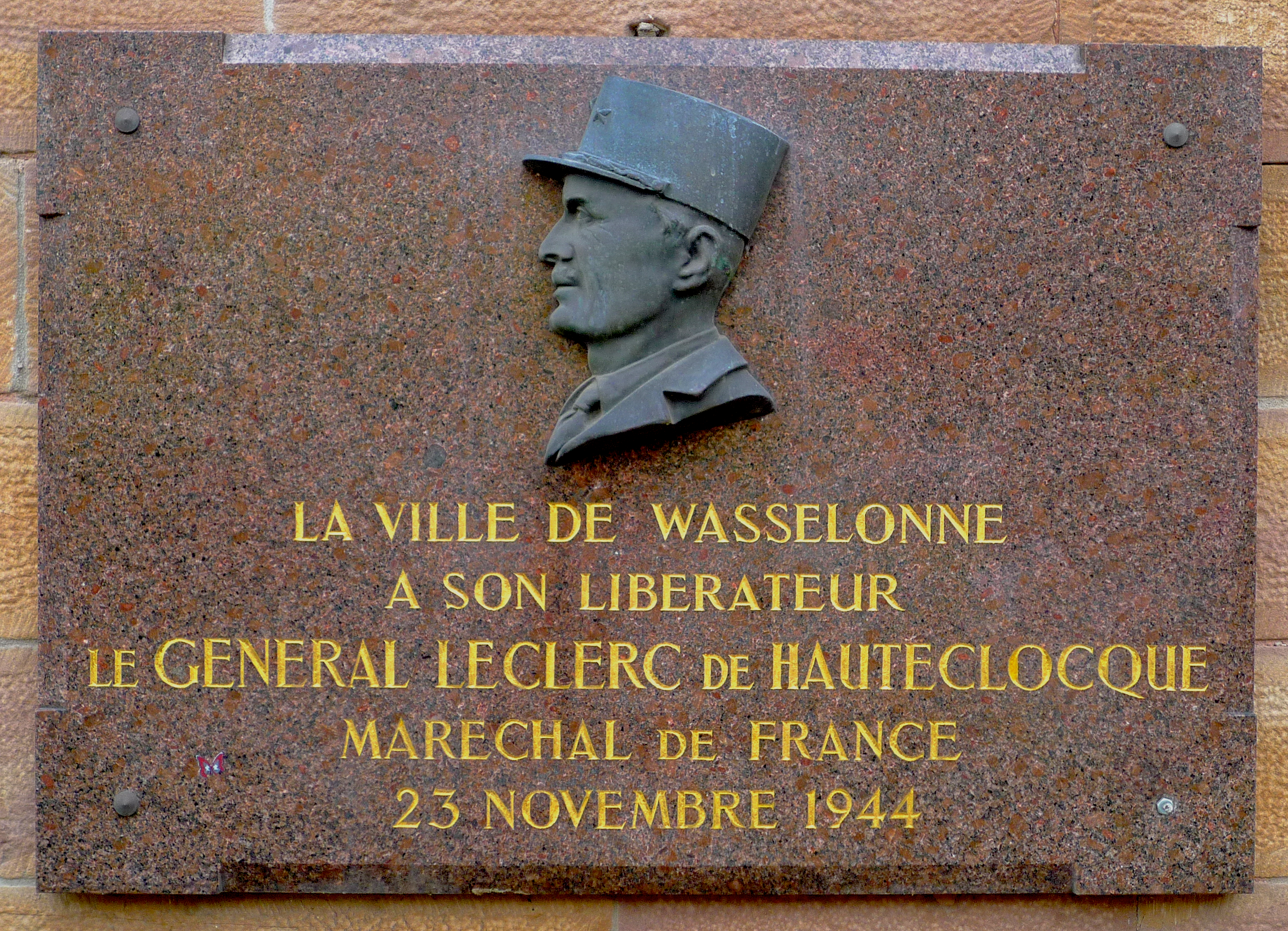
Memorial plaque in Wasselonne
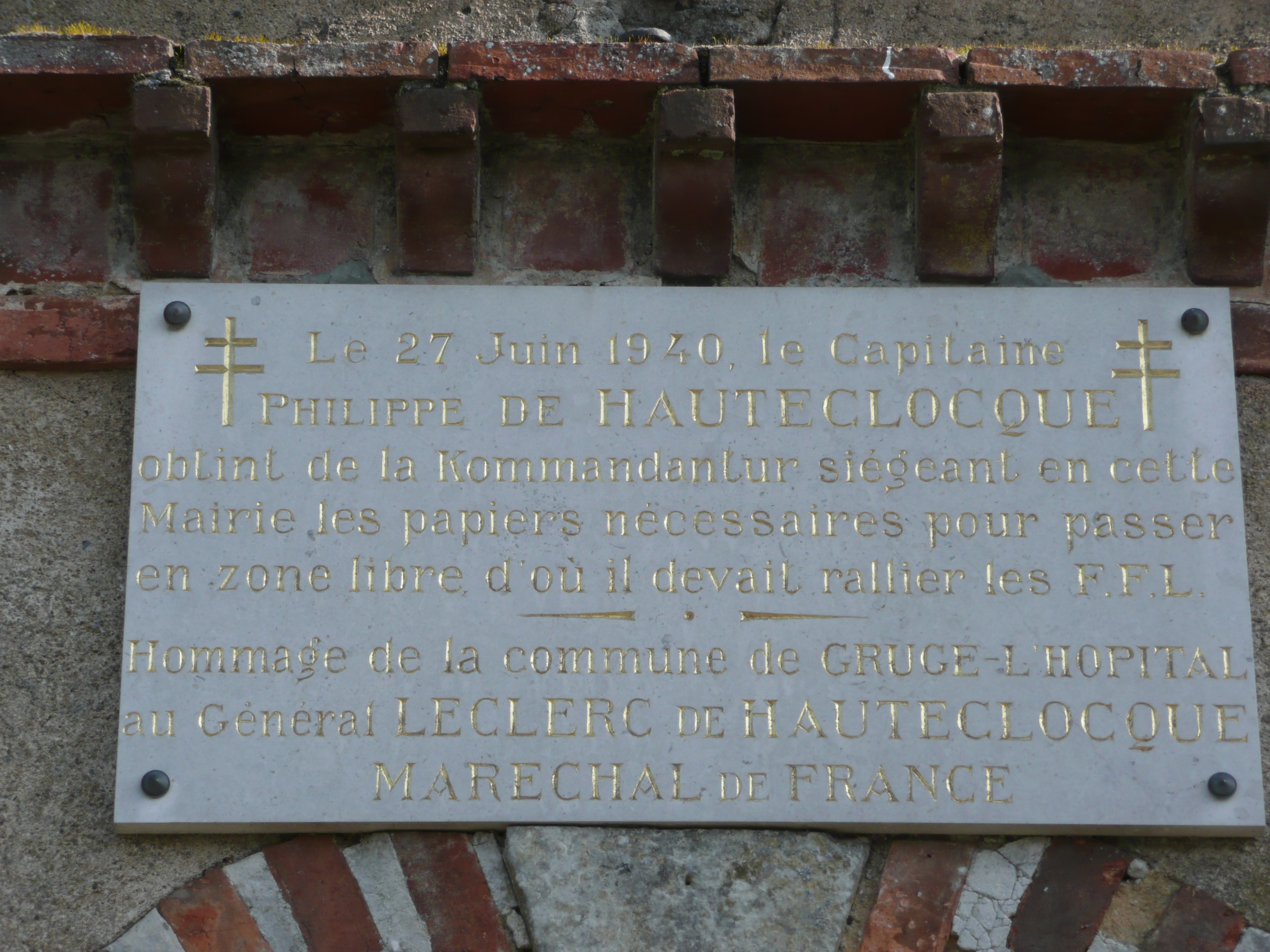
Memorial plaque in Grugé-l'Hôpital

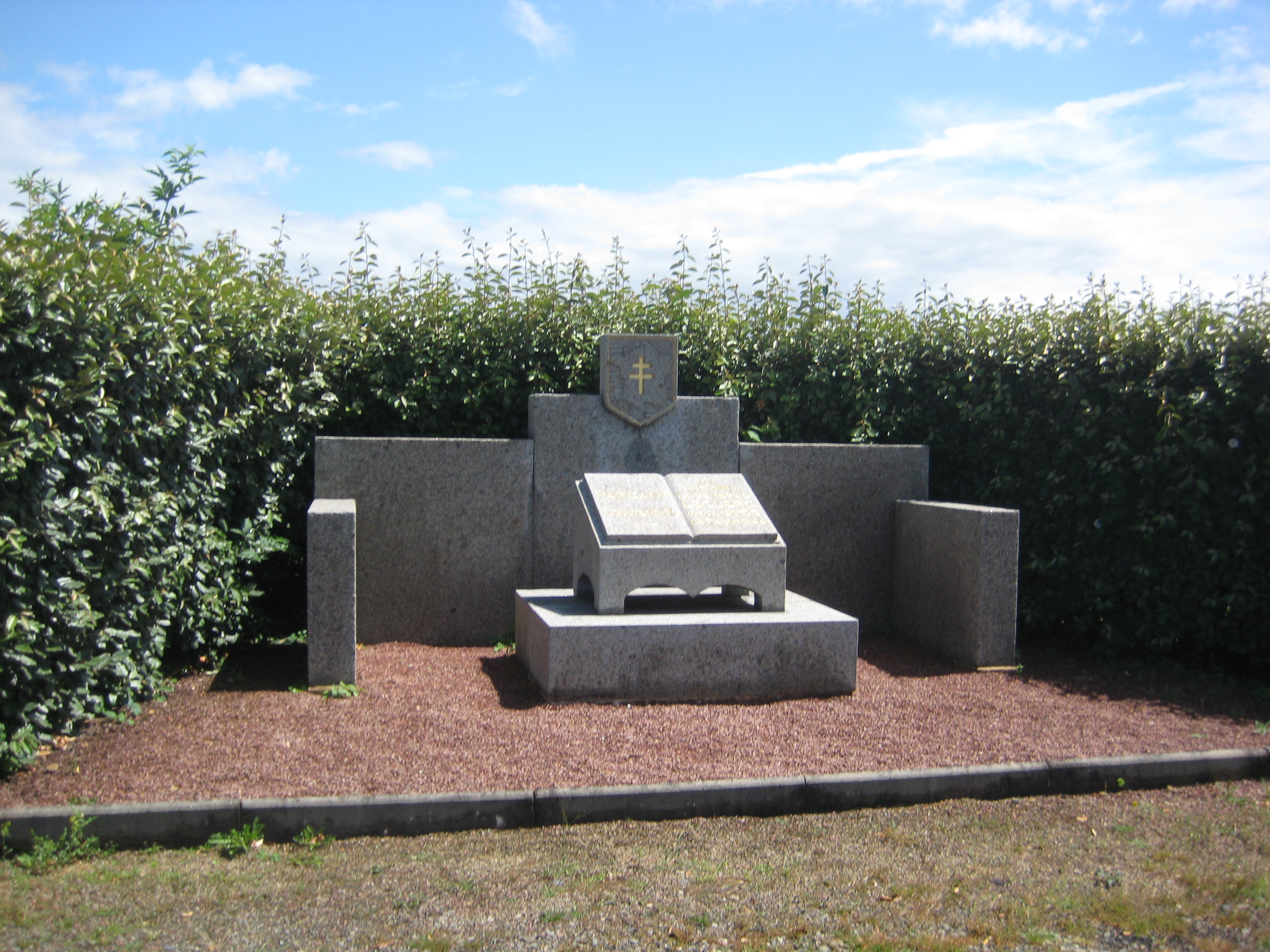
Monument in Domalain

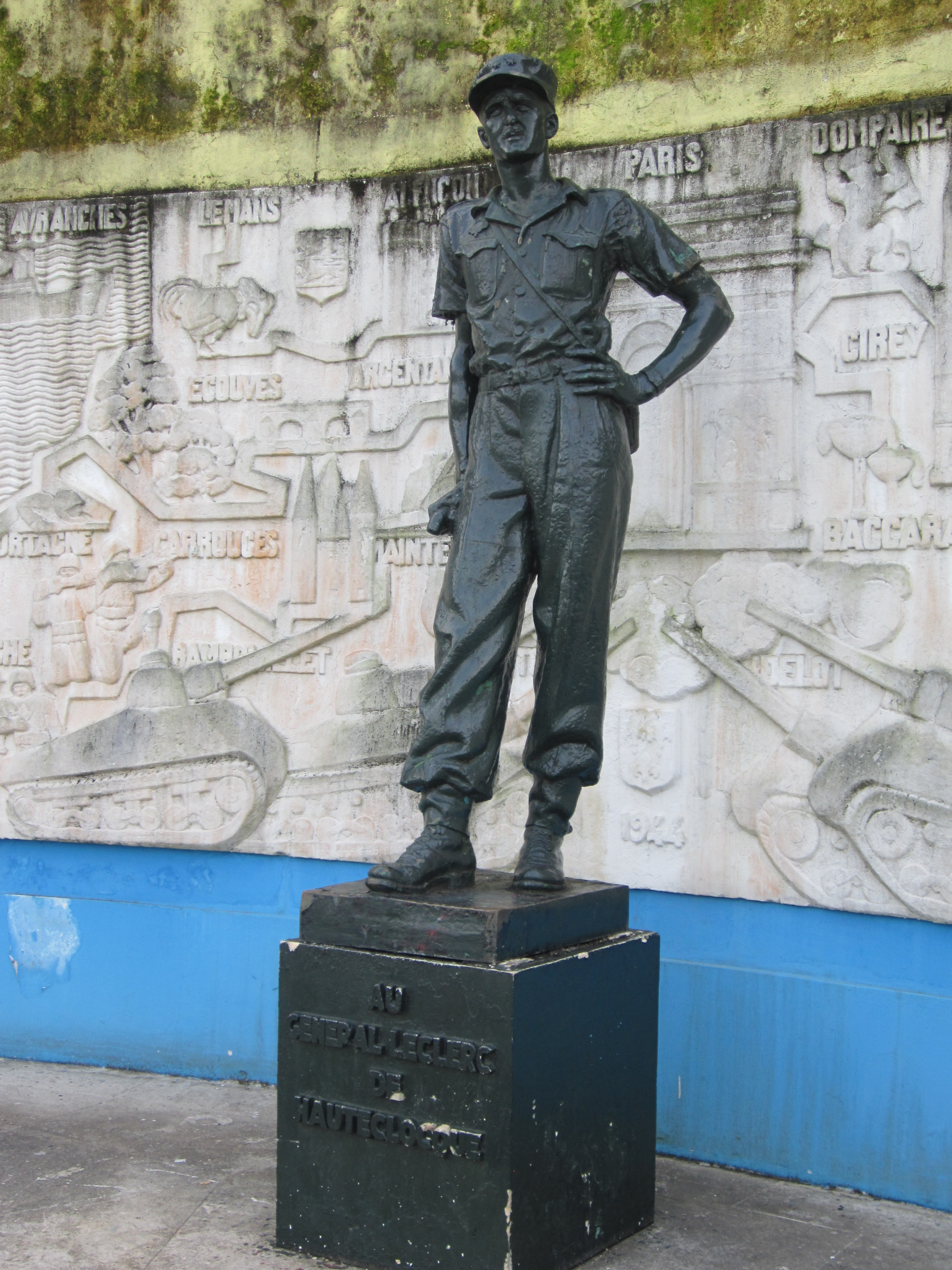
Statue in Douala

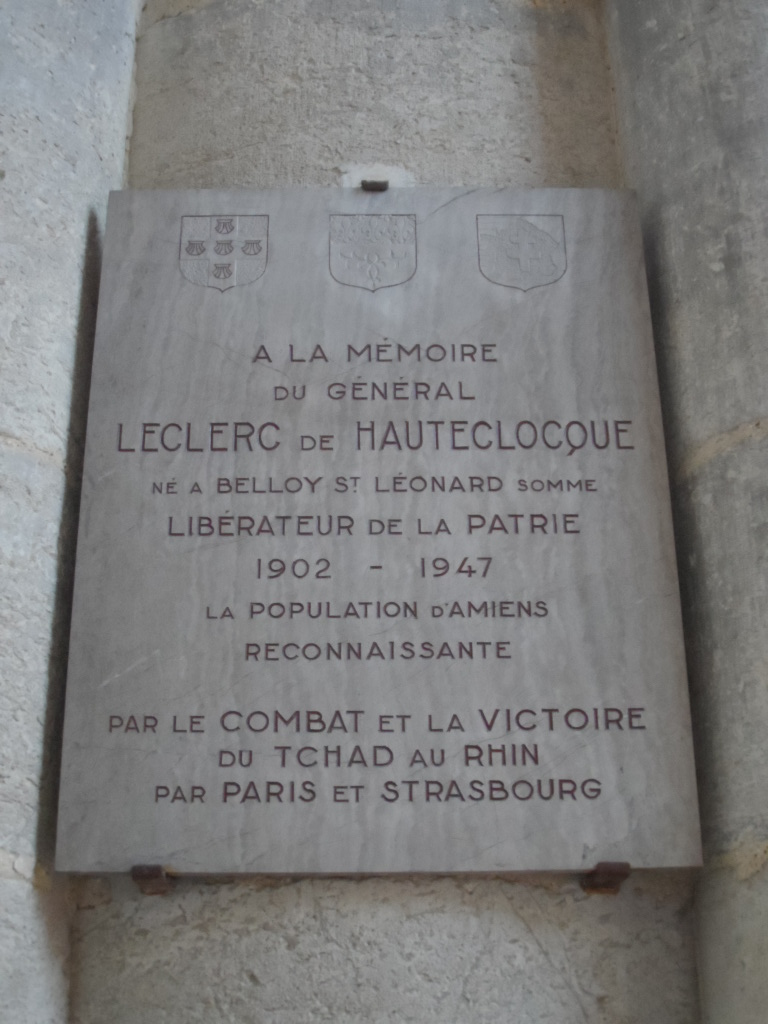
Memorial tablet in Amiens Cathedral

== Military ranks ==
Second lieutenant	Lieutenant	Captain	Squadrons chief	Lieutenant colonel	Colonel
1 October 1924	1 October 1926	25 December 1934	31 July 1940	Never attributed	24 August 1940
Brigade general	Brigade general	Division general	Corps general	Army general	Marshal of France
10 August 1941 Temporary	14 April 1942 Substantive	25 May 1943	25 May 1945	14 July 1946	23 August 1952 Posthumous

== Honours and decorations ==
Honours and decorations
National honours
Ribbon bar	Name	Date	Source
	Grand Cross of the National Order of the Legion of Honour		
	Companion of the National Order of Liberation	6 March 1941	
Military decorations
Ribbon bar	Name	Date	Source
	Military medal	6 June 1946	
	War Cross 1939–1945 with eight palms	6 June 1946	
	War Cross for foreign operational theatres with two palms		
	Resistance Medal with rosette		
	Escapees' Medal		
	Colonial Medal with clasps "Maroc", "Fezzan", "Koufra", "Tripolitaine", "Tunisie", "Extrême-Orient"		
	Insignia for the Military Wounded		
	Commemorative medal for voluntary service in Free France		
	Commemorative war medal 1939–1945		
Foreign honours
Ribbon bar	Name	Country	Source
	Companion of the Order of the Bath	United Kingdom	
	Distinguished Service Order	United Kingdom	
	Silver Star	United States	
	Bronze Star Medal	United States	
	Commander of the Legion of Merit	United States	
	Presidential Unit Citation	United States	
	Grand Officer of the Order of the Crown with palm	Belgium	
	Croix de guerre	Belgium	
	Croix de guerre	Luxembourg	
	Grand Cross of the Order of the Oak Crown	Luxembourg	
	Commander's Cross of Virtuti Militari	Poland	
	Czechoslovak War Cross 1939–1945	Czechoslovakia	
	Military Order of the White Lion	Czechoslovakia	
	War Cross (1st Class)	Greece	
	Grand Officer of the Order of Glory	Tunisia	
	Grand Cross of the Order of Ouissam Alaouite	Morocco	
	Grand Cross of the Royal Order of Cambodia	Cambodia	
	Grand Cross of the Order of the Million Elephants and the White Parasol	Laos	
	Order of the Paz in Morocco	Spain	

=== Citations ===
For his promotion to Companion of the National Order of Liberation:

Leader of the highest value, admirable in zeal and energy. Wounded during the Battle of France, escaped from the hands of the enemy and joined the Free French Forces;
Took a decisive part in the rally of Cameroon, which he then knew, as governor, to organize for the war, and in the liberation of Gabon;
Commander of the troops of Chad, prepared and beautifully conducted the victorious operations of Murzuk and Kufra, which brought glory back under the folds of the flag.

— Journal Officiel de la France Libre, 6 March 1941

For his attribution of the Military Medal:

During a glorious epic, which belongs to history, showed that the French flag always knew how to spread as a victor wherever the sacred cause of the homeland called it.

— Journal Officiel de la République Française, 6 June 1946
