= 1st Light Mechanized Division =

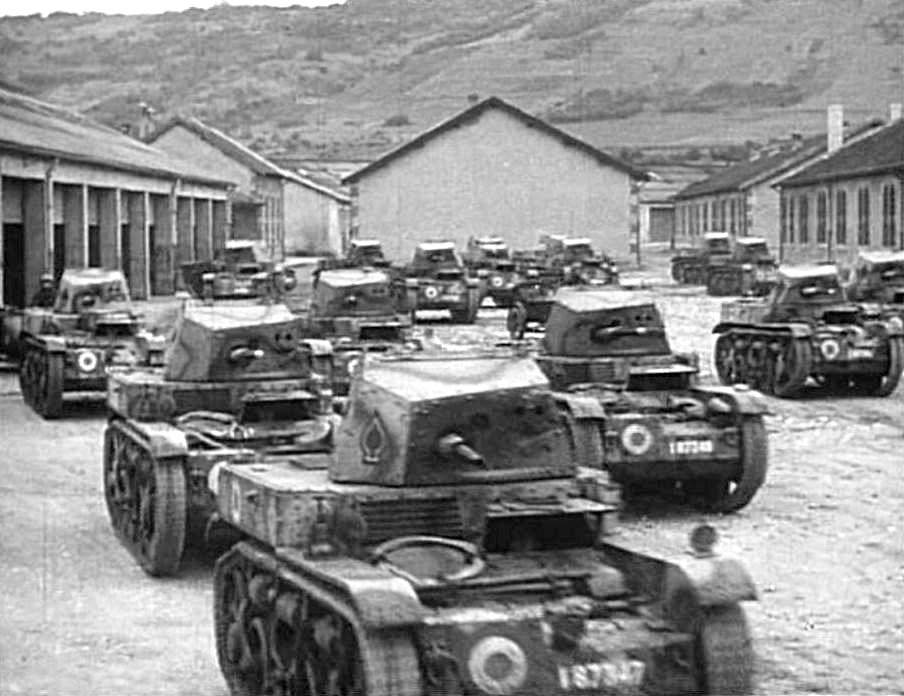
A group of 13.2 mm-armed AMR 35s, belonging to 4e RDP, 1re DLM; the vehicle in front, No. 87347, is the second produced and shows the large rosettes typical of this unit from 1938

The 1st Light Mechanized Division (French: 1ère division légère mécanique, 1ère DLM) was a French Army formation during World War II. It was the first of the armoured divisions of the French Cavalry.

== Formation ==
Preparations to create such a unit began in 1931. Slowly the 4th Cavalry Division was mechanised.

=== Name ===
In July 1935, the mechanised components, though still not fully equipped, were given a separate identity, while confusingly 4th Cavalry continued to exist, giving the false impression the armoured division was a completely new force. The name of the unit is most often translated as "Light Mechanized Division", but a better translation, both from a linguistic as military point of view, would be "Mechanized Light Division". In French the adjective mécanique qualifies légère, not the other way around. In French military parlance, light troops were those that engaged in scouting and skirmishing, and the distinction traditionally applied to both cavalry and infantry arms. A mechanized light division was therefore one designed for this role but using modern motorized and armored equipment to perform it. Some motorised infantry divisions without tracked vehicles would also be called "light divisions".

=== Organisation ===
Another confusion often caused by the category indication is the mistake to assume that such units were "lightly" equipped: in fact most heavy equipment was concentrated into the motorised units which represented the most powerful in the French Army. The 1re DLM used the AMR 35 as a light skirmisher and the Somua S-35 and Hotchkiss H35 as main battle tanks, though the latter vehicle was not really suited for this role as its armament was too weak. The artillery and infantry components were fully motorised; part of the organic infantry was also mechanised, using half-tracks. The 4th Dragoon Regiment and the division's combat engineers were equipped with the six-wheeled VDP Lorraine 28 all-terrain transport vehicle. In organisation a DLM closely resembled the contemporaneous German Panzerdivision of the Panzerwaffe, though it would be more "tank-heavy", not so much the Leichte Kavalleriedivisionen of the German Cavalry, which units in the thirties were only partly mechanised.

== World War II ==
=== Battle Of France ===
During the Battle of France in May 1940 the division contained the following units:

- 1st Light Mechanized Armoured Brigade
  - 4th Cuirassier Armoured Regiment
  - 18th Dragoon Armoured Regiment
- 2nd Light Mechanized Infantry Brigade
  - 4th Mechanized Dragoon Regiment
  - 6th Cuirassier Cavalry Reconnaissance Regiment
- 74th Mechanized Artillery Regiment
