= 18th Dragoon Regiment (France) =

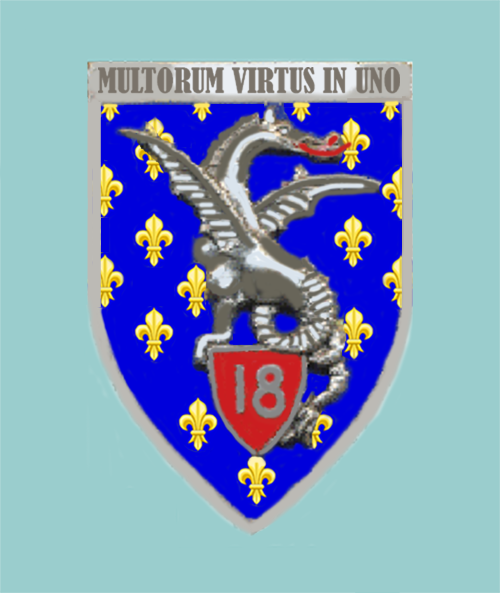
Regimental insignia.

The 18th Dragoon Regiment was a French cavalry regiment. Its motto was Multorum virtus in uno (the power of many in one).

== History ==
=== Ancien Regime to First Empire ===
It was first formed at Metz on 4 April 1744 from existing dragoon regiments as the Régiment des Dragons du Roi, as which it fought in the War of the Austrian Succession (most notably at the Battle of Fontenoy) and the Seven Years' War. It was renamed in 1791 and successively assigned to the Revolutionary Army of the Midi (1792), the Army of the Pyrenees (1793), and the Army of the West (1796). It was then assigned to the Armée d'Italie (1796–1798) then to Napoleon's Egyptian campaign, fighting at the Battle of the Pyramids. It returned to garrison duties in Chagny (1800–1804) and Villers-Cotterêts (1804–1805).

Next it joined the 1805–1807 campaign in Germany, Prussia and Poland. It was the first regiment across the bridge at the battle of Elchingen, capturing the plateau and helping the other light cavalry to regroup. It also fought at Austerlitz, Jena and Eylau, whilst three of its squadrons also took part in the battle of Friedland.

The regiment was then sent to the Peninsular War. At the battle of Almonacid on 2 August 1809 it and the 19th Dragoon Regiment took the Spanish artillery redoubts before charging and routing 7–8,000 Spanish infantrymen. It took part in the French invasion of Russia in 1812, most notably at the battle of Borodino, before finding itself back in Germany during the retreat, fighting at the battles of Leipzig and Hanau

It continued fighting in the retreat into France of 1814, particularly at the battle of Champaubert. It was briefly renumbered the 13th Dragoon Regiment (12 May 1814 – 20 April 1815) by the First Restoration before being reverted to its original number on Napoleon's return. It fought at Fleurus but was disbanded after the Hundred Days.

=== 1871–1913 ===
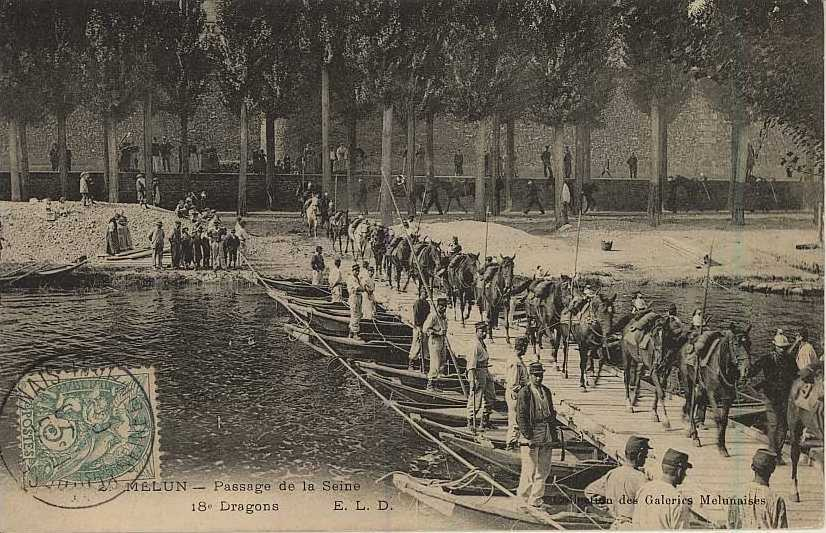
The regiment crosses the River Seine at Melun in 1907.

It was re-raised in 1871 by renaming the 6th Lancer Regiment, which had been raised in 1831 by renaming the Orléans Lancer Regiment, raised in 1830.

Its first postings were to garrison Rambouillet (1871), Versailles (1873), Paris (October 1875) and finally settling at Lunéville with a store or depot at Vitry-le-François (October 1878). It and the 7th Dragoon Regiment then formed the 1st Dragoon Brigade of 2nd Cavalry Division.

In 1879 two of the regiment's squadrons were detached and stationed at Baccarat. In July 1892 1st Dragoon Brigade moved to 5th Cavalry Division. The regiment was sent to reestablish order in Paris in July 1893 and in October of the same year its brigade was moved again, this time into the new 7th Cavalry Division. The regiment later garrisoned Sens (1905), Melun (1907–1910) and Lure (1914–1916).

=== 1914–1929 ===
From the outbreak of war to August 1916 it garrisoned Lure, Haute-Saône as part of 8th Dragoon Brigade. From there it deployed in 1914 to carry out the covering action at Belfort before fighting in Alsace (Altkirch, Colmar), on the Marne (Château-Thierry, Jonchery), in the race to the sea (Artois, Monchy-au-Bois) and on the Meuse (First Battle of Champagne, Maine de Massiges) In August 1916 it was split into two groups of squadrons, one assigned to 55th Infantry Division and the other to 68th Infantry Division.

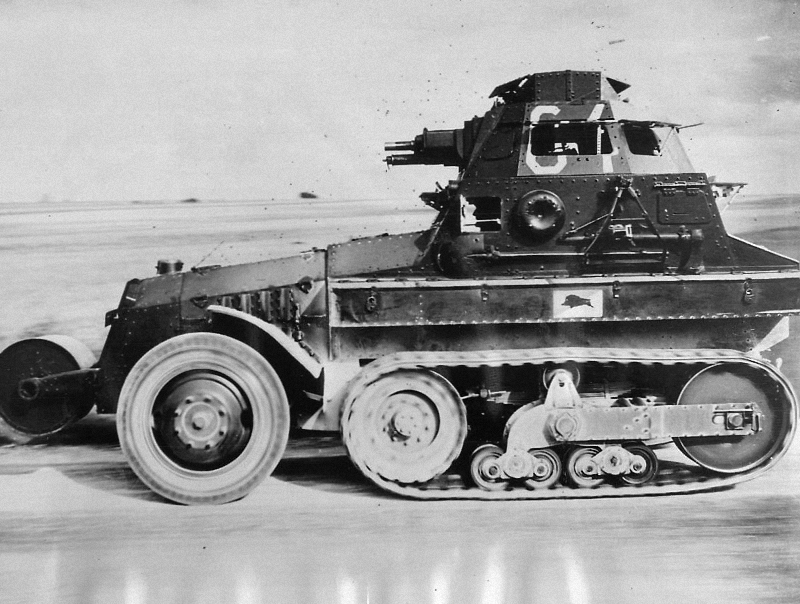
One of the regiment's AMC Schneider P16 around 1936.

The two groups were merged back together at Rudesheim on 7 March 1919 as part of the French force guarding the Rhine. The regiment was moved to Trier at the end of that year. In 1933 it was granted its first insignia, consisting of a hippogriff in a circle, and was motorised in a reconnaissance role.

=== 1930–1938 ===
It, 4th Armoured Car Group (also on garrison duties in Reims) and 4th Dragoon Regiment formed a mechanised brigade within 4th Cavalry Division, designed to test the concept of a light mechanised division. The 18th Dragoon Regiment was equipped with a variety of models of armoured car – White TBCs, Laffly 50 AMs and Panhard 165/175s.

At the end of 1933 general Maxime Weygand reorganised the future light mechanised division, returning the 18th Dragoons and 4th Group to a combat role with AMC Schneider P16s for combat and AMR 33s for reconnaissance. The 1st Light Mechanised Division was formally created in 1935 by renaming the 4th Cavalry Division.

The regiment was reequipped with Somua and Hotchkiss tanks in 1937. It left Reims from 25 September to 7 October 1938 due to that year's partial mobilisation during the Sudetenland Crisis. Echelons "A" of the brigade got to Verdun by road in record time.

=== Second World War ===
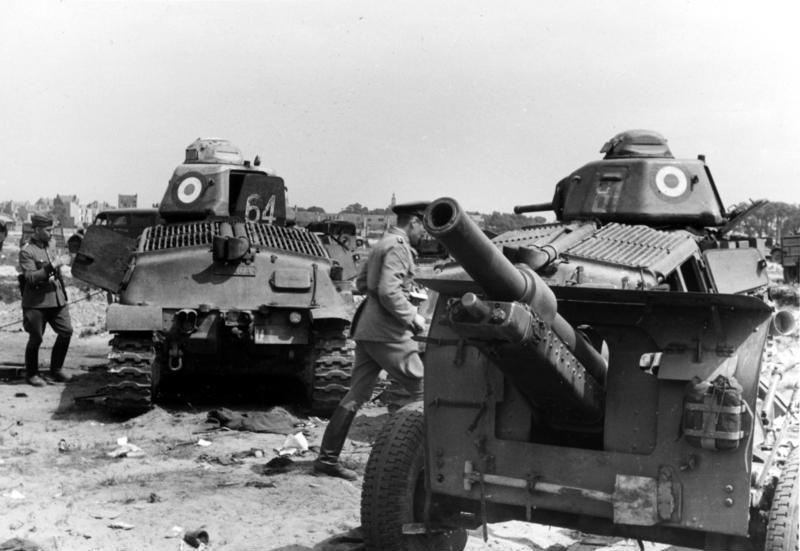
Two of the regiment's S-35s destroyed near Dunkirk, late May 1940.

On 12 September 1939 it embarked at Mourmelon-le-Petit to travel to Verdun, digging in at the latter until 10 May 1940, when 1st Light Mechanised Division supplied four squadrons of Somua S-35s to Henri Giraud's 7th Army to try to assist in the northern Netherlands.

On 22 May it attacked from Neuville-Saint-Vaast towards Mont-Saint-Éloi. Fighting continued after the line was broken from the Dyle to Gembloux, with 2nd Light Mechanised Division fighting in the forêt de Mormal, the 18th Dragoons at Le Quesnoy, and the 4th Cuirassier Regiment at Landrecies.

Right up until the French surrender the regiment's last surviving Somuas were successfully engaging the enemy, finally being sabotaged by their crews within sight of Dunkirk. The regiment was then disbanded, but re-raised after the liberation of France in the area around Paris. It was assigned fifteen Renault R35 tanks and eight Panhard 178 armoured cars and placed in 10th Infantry Division but did not see action before being disbanded again in 1945.

=== 1954-1979 ===
Its last raising was in June 1954 in the major camps in the east as the armoured cavalry element of 11th Infantry Division. At the end of July that year it was posted to Tunisia under Teboursouk and fought in a number of operations in October 1954.

It moved to Algeria in 1957 under colonel Journes then colonel Bouchard. The following year it took part in the Battle of the Frontiers, part of the Algerian War, whilst commanded by Duvivier. It was then put on garrison duties in Blida, Algeria then placed under lieutenant colonel Henri Dequatrebarbes's command in mid 1964. It returned to France to be stationed at Périgueux with the 5th Dragoon Regiment, which became the 5th Mounted Chasseur Regiment.

It had a brief dissolution and recreation in 1964 by renaming the former 9th Hussar Regiment. The same year it joined the garrison at Reims, with two squadrons at Mourmelon-le-Petit in the Zurich district. It was then moved to Mourmelon-le-Grand in 1967. It spent the 1970s in garrison at Mourmelon with AMX-13 tanks (which already had SS11 missiles by 1966). In July 1973 it and the 503e Régiment de chars de combat (also in that garrison) became two of the first units to be assigned AMX-30 tanks.

It then had four tank squadrons and a support and command squadron. Captain Antoine Gouraud commanded the 1st Squadron, which received the regiment's first three tanks (named Antibes, Angoulême and Annecy Agen), attached to the 4th platoon. The regiment was disbanded in 1979.

== Commanders ==
=== Ancien Regime ===
- 1 March 1744 : N., marquis de Creil
- 1745 : N., marquis d’Ormenans
- 9 August 1748 : Alexandre Antoine de Montbelliard, comte de Scey (Note: Brigadier from 22 July 1758, maréchal de camp from 20 February 1761)
- 20 February 1761 : Charles Marie de Sault, marquis de Créqui
- 3 March 1779 : Marie Joseph Paul Yves Roch Gilbert du Mottier, marquis de La Fayette
- 27 January 1782 : Louis Marie, vicomte de Noailles
- 10 March 1788 : Antoine François de Gramont, comte d’Aster

=== 1791–1815 ===
- 1791 : colonel (Henri) Courtais de Moreaux
- January 1793 : lieutenant-colonel (later chef de brigade) Fornier d'Albe
- June 1793 : chef de brigade Robert
- September 1793 : chef de brigade Brochier
- 1795 : chef de brigade Bertot
- 1796 : chef de brigade Ledée
- 1798 : Colonel Louis Nicolas Davout
- 1802 : colonel Lefebvre-Desnouettes
- 1806 : colonel Lafitte
- 1812 : colonel Dard
- 1815 : colonel Adam

=== 1871–1913 ===
- 1871 : colonel L'Hotte
- 1874 : colonel Vata
- 1883 : colonel Lavigne
- 1886 : colonel de Raity de Villeneuve de Vittré (Note: Transferred to another unit before actually arriving with the 18th Regiment)
- 1887 : colonel du Bois de Beauchesne
- 1893 : colonel Fabre
- 1902 : colonel Gauthier
- 1907 : colonel de Bremond d'Ars

=== 1914–1940 ===
- 1914 : colonel Eon (Note: Killed in an accident on 4 August 1914, though his MDH entry states he was "killed by the enemy".)
- August 1914 : colonel Dulac
- 11 August 1916 (on division into two groups of squadrons):
  - 1st group
    - August 1916 : colonel Dulac
    - January 1917 : lieutenant-colonel Boutan
    - April 1918 : lieutenant-colonel Mauche
  - 2nd group
    - August 1916 : commandant Souville
    - March 1919 : lieutenant-colonel Mauche
    - August 1919 : colonel Soulé
- 1940 : lieutenant-colonel Pinon

=== 1954–1979 ===
- 1954 : lieutenant-colonel de Lesperda
- 1955 : lieutenant-colonel Jouitou
- 1966 : colonel de Quatrebarbes
- 1971 : lieutenant-colonel Chevalier de Lauzières
- 1972 : lieutenant-colonel Yvenat
- 1974 : colonel Dumouchel de Prémare
- 1978 : lieutenant-colonel Petit

== Battle honours ==
The regimental colours.

In gold letters on its colours appear the battle honours:

- La Moskova 1812
- Hanau 1813
- Champaubert 1814
- Fleurus 1815
- Alsace 1914
- Artois 1914
- AFN 1952–1962

== Decorations ==
Its tie is decorated with the croix de guerre 1939–1945 and the croix de guerre 1914–1918, both with palms.

== Uniforms ==
Uniforms

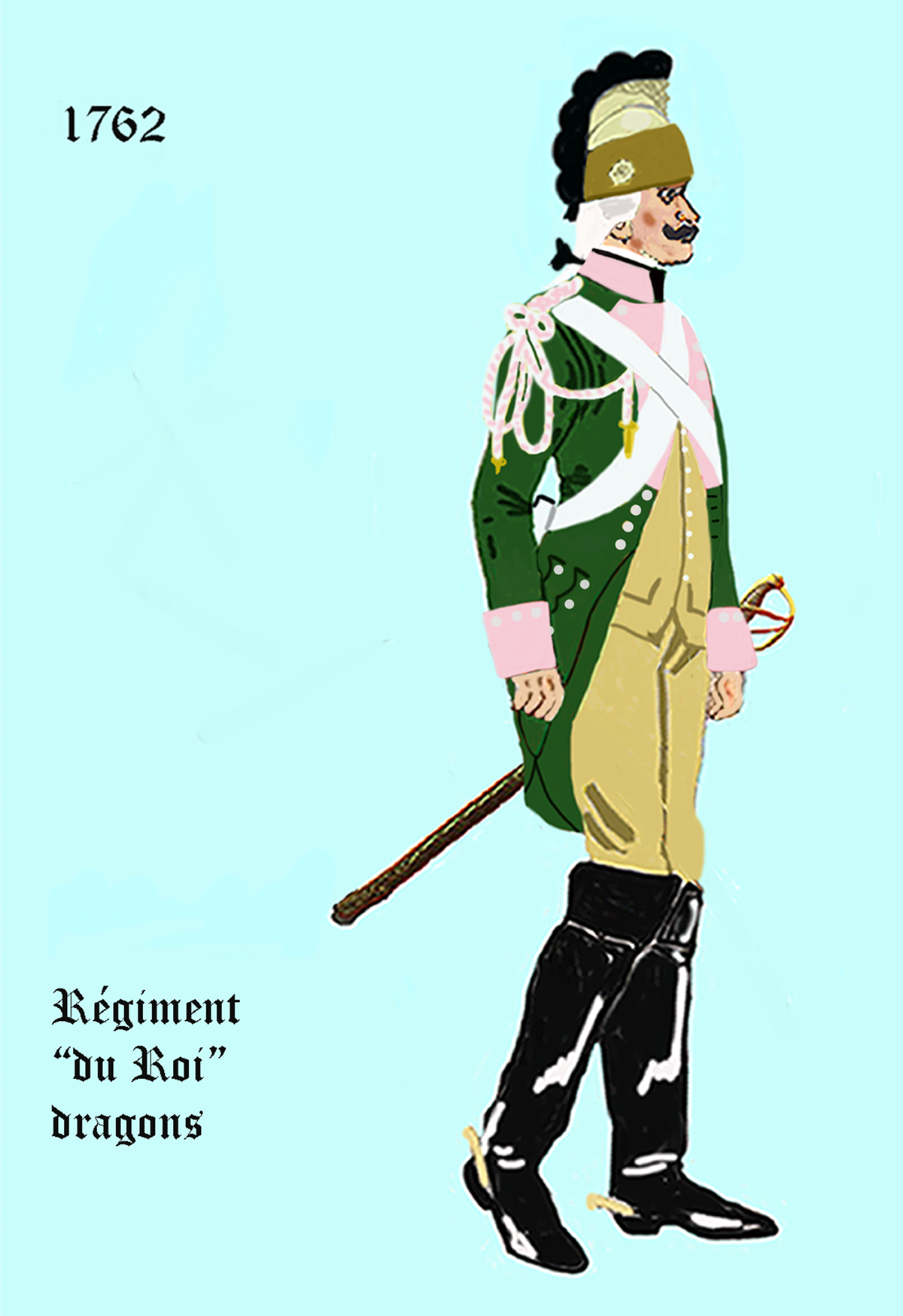
1762-1763

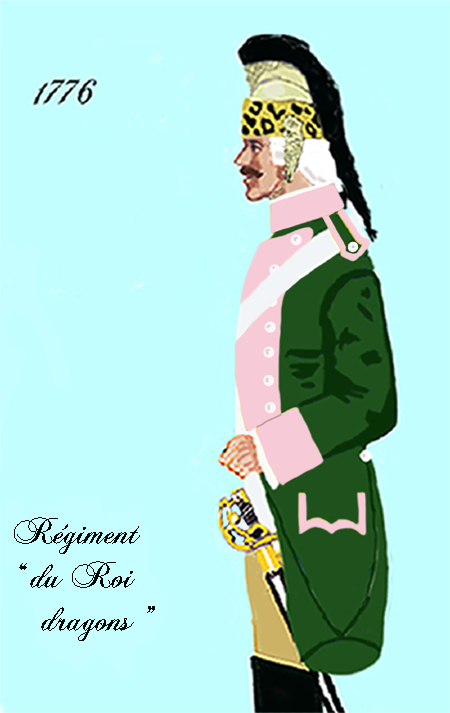
1776-1779

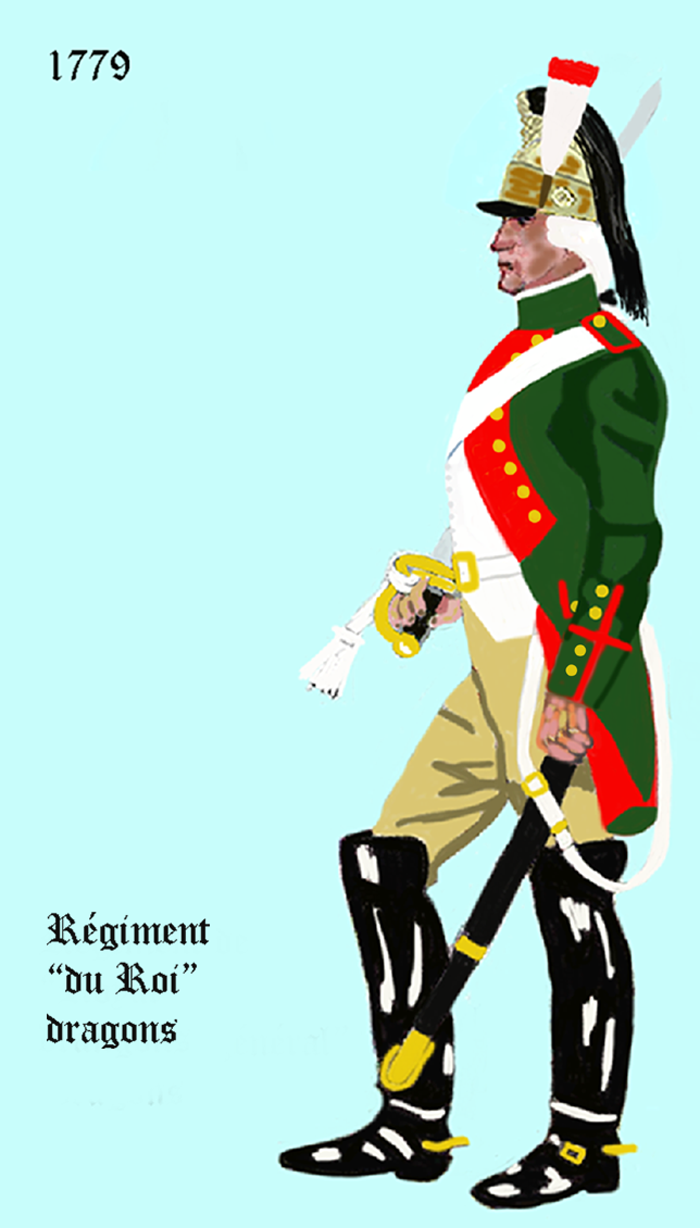
1779-1786

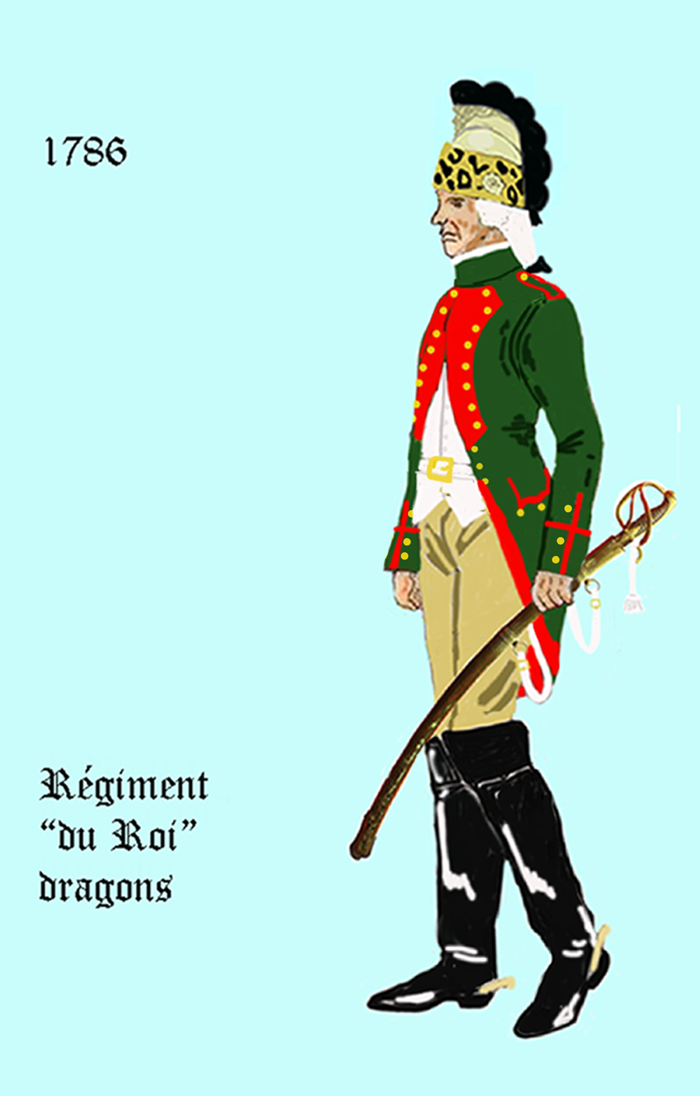
1786-1791

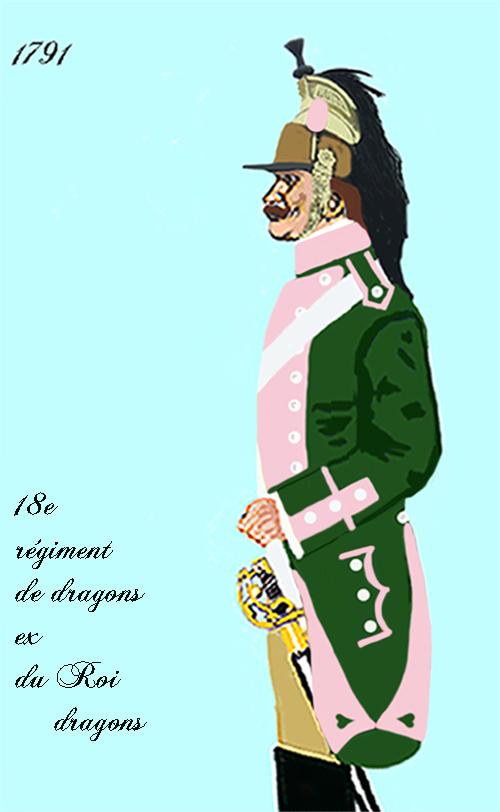
After 1791

== Notable officers and men ==
- Pol Charbonneaux (1909–1954) : Compagnon de la Libération, did his national service in the regiment in 1930.
- Emmanuel d'Harcourt (1914–1985) : Compagnon de la Libération; in 1939, whilst preparing for the Grand Concours des Affaires étrangères, he was called up as a sub-lieutenant in the 18th Dragoon Regiment, in which he commanded the anti-aircraft platoon
- Jean-Baptiste Robert : a captain, lieutenant-colonel and finally chef de brigade

== Bibliography ==
- Cuel, F. (1894). Historique du 18e régiment de dragons – 1744–1894. Paris., available at Gallica
- Historique du 18e régiment de dragons pendant la guerre 1914-1918. Nancy: Impr. Berger-Levrault., available at Gallica.
- Vauvillier, François (2005). "18e régiment de dragons (1934-1937)". Les automitrailleuses de reconnaissance. Les matériels de l'armée française (in French). Vol. 1: L'AMR 33 Renault : ses précurseurs, ses concurrentes et ses dérivés. Paris: Histoire & Collections. pp. 44–47. ISBN 2-915239-67-3.
