= Mourmelon =

Mourmelon may refer to:

- Mourmelon-le-Grand, a municipality in the Marne department in north-eastern France
- Mourmelon-le-Petit, a municipality in the Marne department in north-eastern France
- Camp de Châlons, also known as camp de Mourmelon, a military camp at Mourmelon-le-Grand
- Mourmelon 131 military airbase, a former military airbase near the camp de Châlons
- Mourmelon-le-Grand Airfield, an abandoned World War II military airfield built by the USAAF, used from September 1944 till July 1945
