= Thomas Bouquerot de Voligny =

French magistrate and politician

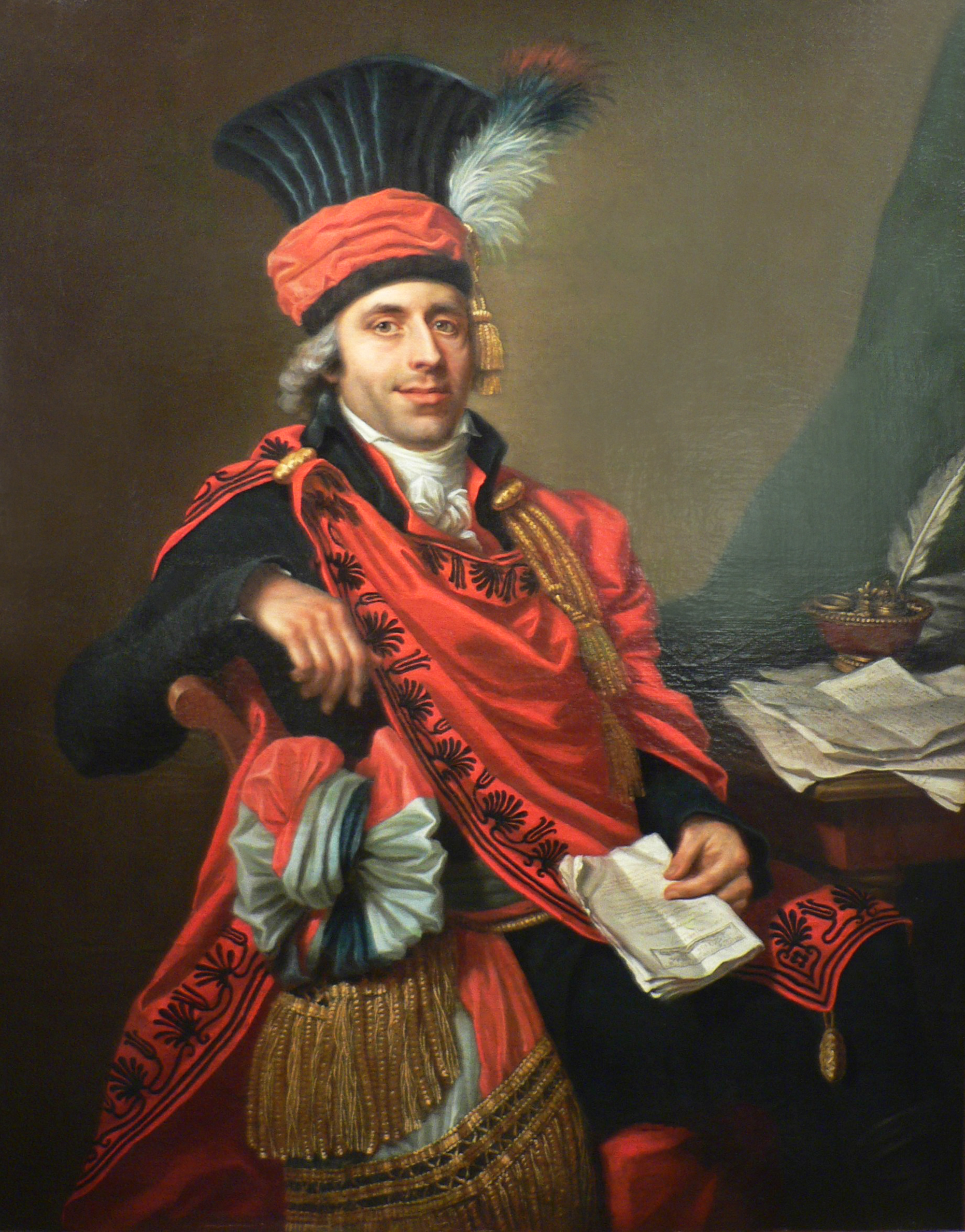
Thomas Bouquerot de Voligny in the full dress uniform of a member of the Council of Ancients, c. 1798–1799.

Thomas André Marie Bouquerot de Voligny (27 August 1755 in Asnan – 26 August 1841 in Paris) was a French magistrate and politician. His brother was the general Jean-Baptiste Bouquerot des Essarts.
