= 4th Dragoons =

The 4th Dragoons or 4th Dragoon Regiment may refer to:

- 4th Queen's Own Hussars, a former British Army cavalry regiment: previously the 4th (Queen's Own) Regiment of Dragoons and the 4th (Queen's Own) Regiment of Light Dragoons
- 4th Dragoon Regiment (France)
- Regiment "Genova Cavalleria" (4th), an Italian Army cavalry regiment: previously the 4th Dragoons Reconnaissance Group

== See also ==
- 4th Royal Irish Dragoon Guards
- 4th Princess Louise Dragoon Guards
