= Jean-Baptiste Bouquerot des Essarts =

French maréchal de camp and Baron de l'Empire

Jean-Baptiste Bouquerot des Essarts (French pronunciation: [ʒɑ̃ batist bukʁo dez‿esaʁ]; 28 May 1771, in Asnan – 17 March 1833, in Fontainebleau) was a French maréchal de camp and Baron de l'Empire. He was the younger brother of the politician Thomas Bouquerot de Voligny. He was colonel of the 4th Dragoon Regiment between 28 October 1811 and 28 December 1815.
