= 10th Infantry Division (France) =

- 10e division d'infanterie
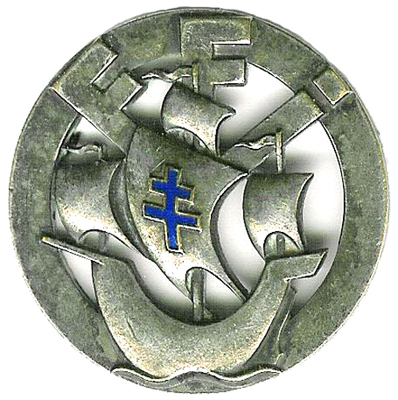
- Divisional insignia during World War II
- Active: 28 September 1873 – 30 April 1946
- Country: France
- Type: Infantry
- Engagements: World War I World War II

Commanders
- Notable commanders: General Gouraud (1914-15); Pierre Billotte (1944-45)

The 10th Infantry Division (10e DI) was an infantry division of the French Army which took part in the First World War, and Second World War.

== History ==
The division was created by the decree of 28 September 1873. Located in the 13th military region (Clermont-Ferrand), it was made up of two brigades.

At the beginning of the First World War, it was mobilised in the 5th Military Region and formed part of the 5th Army Corps from August 1914 to November 1918.

On 10 May 1940 the 10th DI, under the orders of General Sisteron, was attached to the reserve of the French General Headquarters, then on 16 May to the 23rd Army Corps and on 16 June 1940 to the 2nd Army, with which it capitulated on 25 June and was subsequently disbanded.

After the Normandy landings, the division was reconstituted, mainly of troops of Parisian FFI/Francs-Tireurs and Partisans (French Communists) origin, on 1 October 1944, in the Nevers region under the command of General Pierre Billotte. Originally, it was to include:

- Three infantry regiments:
  - 5th Infantry Regiment - Lieutenant-colonel Emblanc
  - 24th Infantry Regiment - Lieutenant-colonel Bablon
  - 46th Infantry Regiment
- 32nd Artillery Regiment,
- 18th Dragoon Regiment.

The 46th Infantry Regiment was quickly replaced by the 4th Demi-Brigade de Chasseurs of Commander Petit, made up of the 4th BCP and the 1er BCP of Paris.

It was later integrated into the 1st Army of General Jean de Lattre de Tassigny, under the wider banner of the French Liberation Army. The division took part in the final liberation of the Colmar Pocket (2 January - 9 February 1945), taking 32 casualties.

Sent then to the Atlantic coast, it helped liberate the last pockets of resistance around the ports. In Germany, it was assigned responsibility for the region of Koblenz as part of the French occupation zone. At the request of General Billotte to COMAC, Colonel Henri Rol-Tanguy, commander of the divisional infantry, was subsequently made assistant to the commander of the military government of the district of Koblenz.

The division was part of the occupation troops in Germany until its dissolution on 30 April 1946. During this period the division was assigned to the 2nd Army Corps.

== Sources ==
=== Sources et bibliographie ===
- De Lattre de Tassigny, Histoire de la première armée française - Plon - 1949.
- Ordres de bataille des grandes unités : divisions d'infanterie, divisions de cavalerie
