= 7th Cavalry Division (France) =

- 7e division de cavalerie
- Active: 1893-1917
- Disbanded: July 23, 1917
- Country: France
- Branch: French Army
- Type: Cavalry
- Garrison/HQ: 1893 Meaux, 1894-1917 Melun
- Engagements: World War I

The 7th Cavalry Division was a cavalry division of the French Army that participated in World War I.

== Composition ==
Before the outbreak of World War I, these units were under the 7th Cavalry Division.

=== Pre-World War I ===
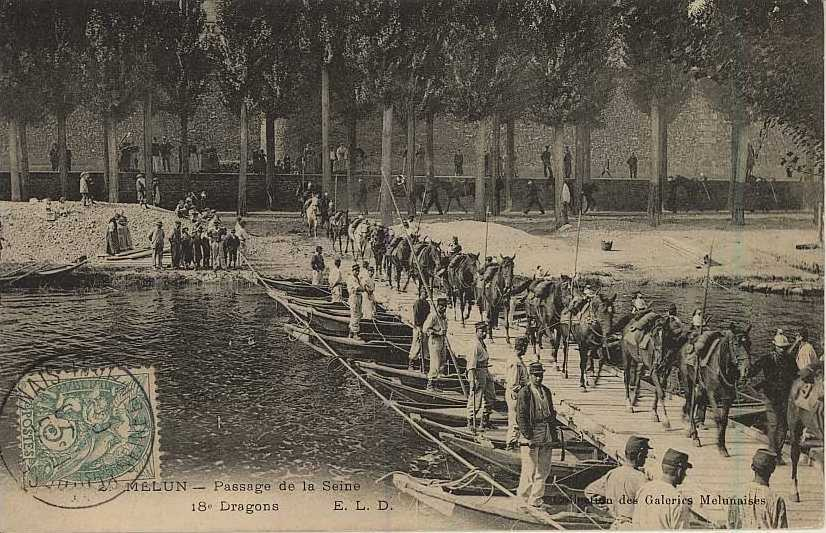
Dragoons of the 18th Regiment of Melun

==== 1894 ====
- 1st Dragoon Brigade
  - 13th Cuirassier Regiment
  - 7th Dragoon Regiment
  - 18th Dragoon Regiment
- 6th Dragoon Brigade
  - 2nd Dragoon Regiment
  - 19th Dragoon Regiment

==== 1906 ====
- 1st Cuirassier Brigade
  - 5th Cuirassier Regiment
  - 8th Cuirassier Regiment
- 1st Dragoon Brigade
  - 7th Dragoon Regiment
  - 18th Dragoon Regiment

==== 1914 ====
- 6th Cuirassier Brigade
  - 11th Cuirassier Regiment
  - 12th Cuirassier Regiment
- 1st Dragoon Brigade
  - 7th Dragoon Regiment
  - 13th Dragoon Regiment
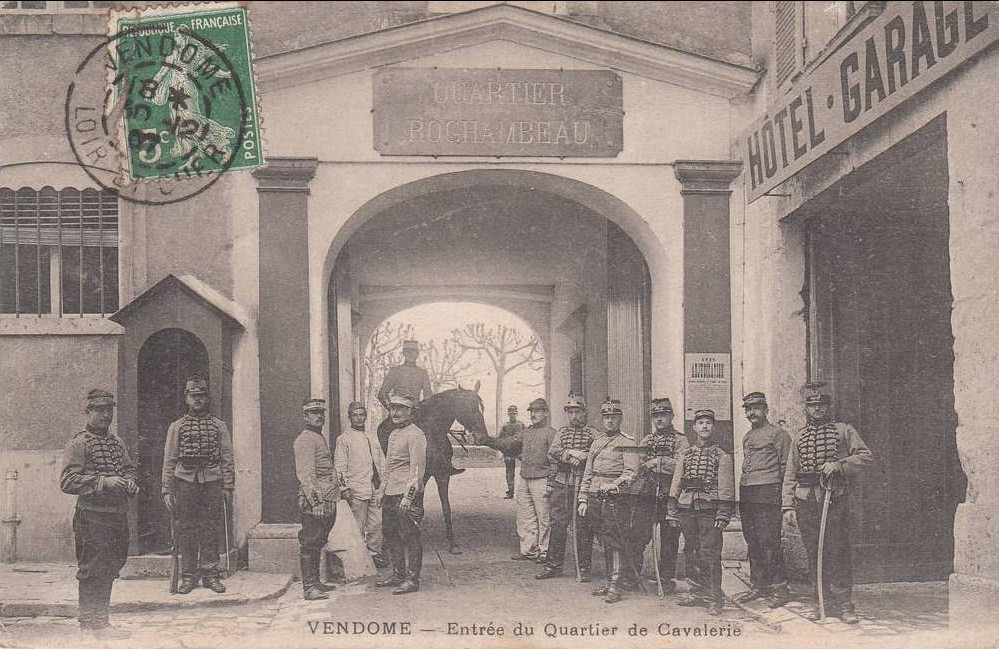
    The barracks of the 20th Chasseur à Cheval Regiment in Vendôme at the beginning of the 20th century.
- 7th Cavalry Brigade
  - 1st Chasseur à Cheval Regiment
  - 20th Chasseur à Cheval Regiment

==== Others ====
- 7th Cyclist Group of the 4th Battalion of Foot Chasseurs
- 4th Horse Group of the 30th Field Artillery Regiment

=== World War I ===
During World War I, these were the units under the division.

- 6th Cuirassier Brigade (until June 1916):
  - 11th Cuirassier Regiment
  - 12th Cuirassier Regiment
- 1st Dragoon Brigade:
  - 7th Dragoon Regiment
  - 13th Dragoon Regiment
- 7th Light Cavalry Brigade:
  - 1st Chasseur à Cheval Regiment
  - 10th Chasseur à Cheval Regiment (from January 1915, transferred from the 32nd Army Corps, then returned to the 32nd Cavalry Corps in February 1916)
  - 20th Chasseur à Cheval Regiment (reduced to 80% strength in November 1914, then reconstituted from July 1915)
- 15th Dragoon Brigade (from June 1916, transferred from the disbanded 10th Cavalry Division):
  - 10th Dragoon Regiment
  - 19th Dragoon Regiment
- Dismounted Cavalry:
  - 7th Cuirassier Regiment (formed in November 1914 with a squadron from each of the shock regiments)
  - 12th Dismounted Cuirassier Regiment (dismounted in June 1916)

Armored Car and Auto-cannon Groups:

- 6th GAMAC (from December 1914)
- 16th GAMAC (from November 1915)

Others:

- 7th Cyclist Group of the 4th Battalion of Foot Chasseurs
- 4th Horse Group of the 30th Field Artillery Regiment
- Cyclist Sappers of the 1st Engineer Regiment
- Detachment of the Territorial Military Engineers of the 8th Engineer Regiment

Armored Car and Auto-cannon Groups:

- 6th GAMAC (from December 1914)
- 16th GAMAC (from November 1915)

== History ==
The 7th Cavalry Division was formed in 1893 at Meaux. This location was only temporary, and the division subsequently moved to Melun.

In 1914, the 7th Cavalry Division was mobilized in France and transported to the frontlines. From August, it fought in the Battle of the Ardennes before retreating toward the Argonne in Vavincourt. On 25 August, General Gillain was removed from command because the division had been exhausted by repeated marches and had failed to adequately support the infantry. In September, the division fought in the First Battle of the Marne and the Battle of Verdun, including fighting around Étain, Spincourt, and Doncourt-aux-Templiers. Later that month, it fought at Flirey and defended the Hauts-de-Meuse. In October, the division was moved north and fought in the First Battle of Artois and it participated in the Battle of the Yser and the First Battle of Ypres.

In 1915, the unit moved south from February 6 to May 8, resting in Auxi-le-Château and Saint-Pol regions. From May 8 to August 30, they moved toward Avesnes-le-Comte, standing ready to pursue interventions during the May 9 and June 16 offensives of the Second Battle of Artois, before returning to Auxi-le-Château with elements deployed toward Neuville-Saint-Vaast and the Calonne trench. Between August 30 and September 11, they moved to Conty for rest. From September 11 to October 18, they were transported by rail (VF) to the Sézanne region, moving toward Suippes starting September 20, where they prepared to support the pursuit in the Second Battle of Champagne while dismounted elements engaged near Souain. From October 18 to October 26, they moved to Champaubert to rest, and from October 26, 1915, to July 8, 1916, they moved to the front line to occupy a sector between the Marquises farm and northeast Prosnes, which was slightly reduced on the right side from May 5 to May 23.

From July 8 to November 17, 1916, the unit was transported by rail (VF) to the Breteuil region, undergoing training at the Crèvecœur camp, followed by training near Auneuil (August 15 to September 5), Saint-Just-en-Chaussée (September 5 to 29), and again near Auneuil (September 29 to November 16), with elements stationed in the sector toward Tracy-le-Val and Lihons; then, from November 17, 1916, to January 15, 1917, they moved toward Château-Thierry, occupying a sector between the east of Soissons and Pernant starting December 2.

In 1917, after withdrawing from the front between January 15 and March 9, the unit moved toward Provins for rest and training, followed by training at the Mailly camp from March 9 to April 8. From April 8 to 18, it moved to Fismes and was held in readiness to intervene for the pursuit during the Second Battle of the Aisne without being committed as a whole, though dismounted elements were engaged near the Cavaliers de Courcy from April 12 to May 5. Between April 18 and May 27, the unit moved south to rest near Anglure and Fère-Champenoise, with elements holding a sector in the Reims region starting May 5. From May 27 to June 21, it moved back to the front to occupy a sector near the Marquises farm and the eastern approaches to Reims alongside elements of the 2nd and 4th Cavalry Divisions. Finally, after withdrawing from the front between June 21 and July 23 to rest near Anglure and Fère-Champenoise.

The division was disbanded on July 23, 1917.
