= 9th Hussar Regiment (France) =

9th Hussar Regiment 9^{e} régiment de hussards
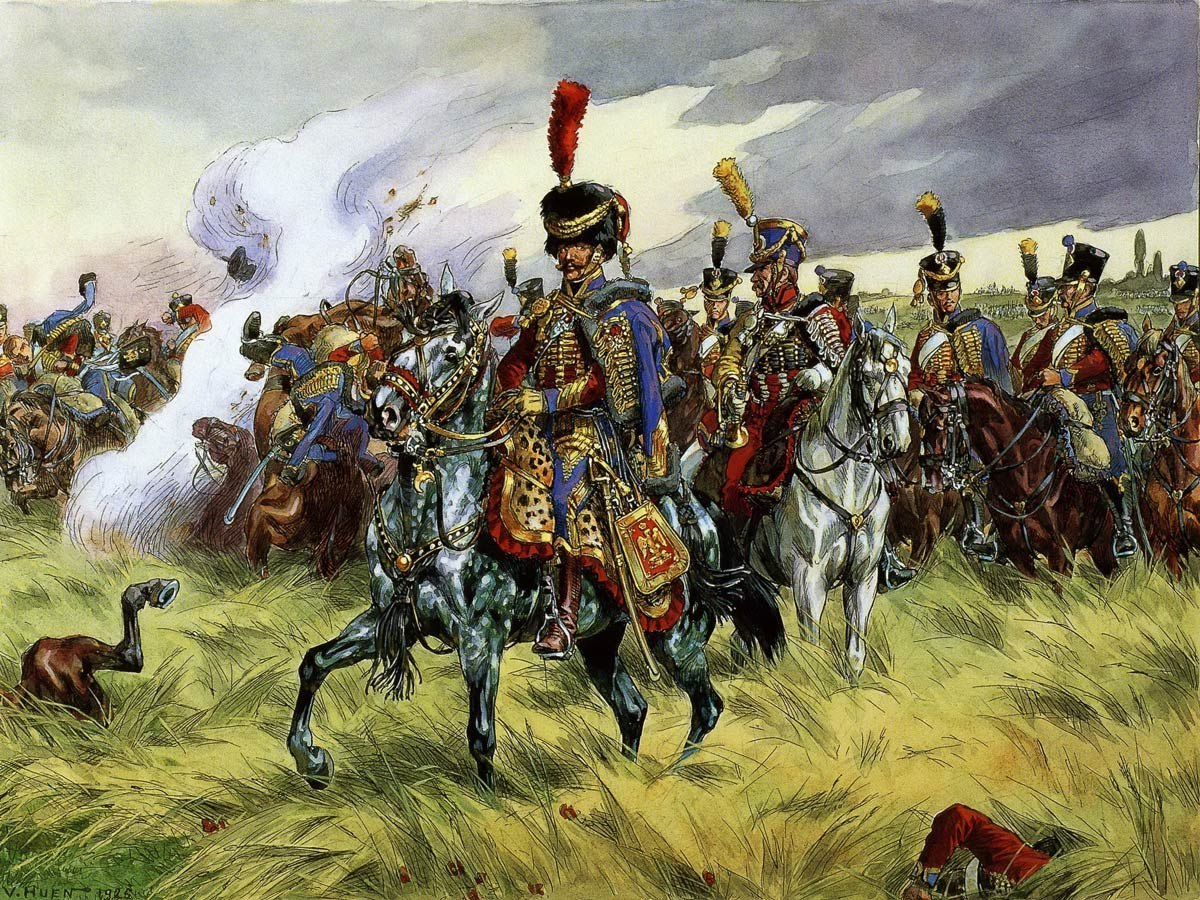
- Illustration of the regiment during the Napoleonic Wars
- Active: 1792–1979
- Country: France
- Branch: Army
- Type: Cavalry
- Role: Hussars
- Anniversaries: Saint George, Saint-Georges
- Engagements: French Revolutionary Wars Napoleonic Wars; Franco-Prussian War; World War I Algerian War
- Decorations: Gold Medal of the City of Milan
- Battle honours: Zurich 1799; Jena 1806; Wagram 1809; La Moskowa 1812; Champagne 1915; Flandres 1918; AFN 1952–1962

The 9th Hussar Regiment (9e régiment de hussards) was a hussar regiment of the French Army. The 9th Hussar Regiment fought in the Napoleonic Wars, World War I and the Algerian War before finally being disbanded in 1979.

== History ==
The regiment's ancestry is drawn from two separate units, one originating in a squadron of the Hussards de la Liberté and the other in the Régiment des Guides.

=== The Revolutionary Wars ===
Its origins lay in the Hussards de la Liberté, set up on 2 September 1792 and by a decree of the National Convention dated 23 November 1792. This unit was divided into two squadrons of 200 men each (the first squadron made up of volunteers from Paris and the second from volunteers from Lille) and came ninth in the army order of precedence by a decree of the French National Convention of 4 June 1793. On 25 March 1793, that unit's second squadron became the 10th Hussar Regiment (whilst on 1 May 1794 the first squadron of the Hussards de la Liberté became the 7e régiment bis de hussards). On 4 June 1794, after the defection of the 4th Hussar Regiment, the 10th Hussar Regiment was re-numbered as the 9th Hussar Regiment. In 1795, the regiment was involved in the Vendée Revolt. It was part of the Army of the Rhine in 1796 and the Army of the Danube in 1798. It was known as the Hussards Rouges or Red Hussars after its scarlet dolmans.

=== The Napoleonic Wars ===
Standard of the 9th Hussar Regiment

It then formed part of the Grande Armée from 1805 onwards. In 1805, it took on the Third Coalition in the Battle of Austerlitz. 1806–07 made them take part in the war of the fourth coalition in the battles of Jena–Auerstedt, Stettin and Friedland, all in modern day Germany and Poland. In 1809 it took part in the war of the fifth coalition and charged at Eckmühl then at Wagramagainst the forces of Archduke Charles. In 1812 it took part in the French invasion of Russia, attacking at Borodino, and surviving the retreat from Moscow. In 1813–14 it took part in the war of the sixth coalition at the battles of Bautzen and Leipzig. When they were pushed back to the French Frontier, what remained of the regiment after the retreat through Germany was converted into the régiment de Berry-hussards (with precedence number 6) on 12 May 1814.

=== In The Industrial Age ===
On 27 September 1840, by decree of Louis Philippe I of France, the 9th Hussars was re-created out of detachments from the 1st Hussar Regiment, 3rd Hussar Regiment, 4th Hussar Regiment, 6th Hussar Regiment and 9th Mounted Chasseur Regiment. Its dolman was now black and it was nicknamed the Hussards Noirs or Black Hussars, a name it held until the proclamation of the Second French Empire. On 4 May 1856 it was disbanded.

=== Régiment des Guides ===
Meanwhile, in 1852, the Régiment des Guides was formed. On 1 May 1854 this became the régiment des guides de la Garde Impériale, and in 1871, became 9th Hussar Regiment.

=== World War I ===
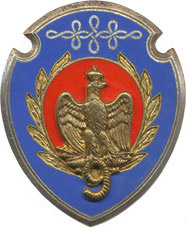
Insignia of the 9th Hussars

The 9th Hussars were mobilized on 2 August 1914, commanded by Colonel Burette. The regiment was positioned between 14th and 21st Corps, fighting in the Battle of the Frontiers. On 19 September, the regiment was transported by rail to the Somme where it faced the 21st Prussian Corps. The 9th Hussars became part of the 1st Cavalry Corps on 21 October and participated in the Race to the Sea. Brought back to Amiens in December, the 9th Hussars were in operations on the Somme until August 1916. On 6 August 1916, the regiment was relocated to take part in the Second Battle of Champagne, as part of 14th Corps. The 9th Hussars attacked on 26 September, suffering heavy losses. After the offensive, the regiment was moved to Montbéliard. In response to the German attacks at Verdun, the regiment was transferred to the Meuse on 29 February 1916. In December 1917, the regiment was moved to the Somme again and left on 28 May for the Chemin des Dames. The regiment took part in the Battle of Malmaison from 16 August to 23 October. In November, the 9th Hussars were withdrawn and stationed in Villers-Cotterêts. In January 1918, the regiment moved to Alsace. As part of 14th Corps, the 9th Hussars retreated to the Somme after the German spring offensive in early April. The regiment participated in the Fifth Battle of Ypres in the last months of the war. The regiment was disbanded in 1922 at Chambéry, where it was then on garrison duties.

=== World War II and the Cold War ===
It was briefly re-formed in 1944, before being permanently re-created on 20 May 1956 at Sissonne to fight in Oranie. In 1962 it served as the garrison at Reims, before being disbanded on 1 June 1964, becoming the 18th Dragoon Regiment as the Reims garrison. On 1 July 1964 it was recreated for the Algerian War before being finally disbanded in 1979.

== Commanders ==
- 1792: Jacques-Polycarpe Morgan
- 1794: Chef de brigade Thierry
- 1798: Nicolas Ducheyron
- 1801: Chef de brigade Guyot
- 1805: Colonel Barbanegre
- 1806: Pierre Edme Gautherin
- 1809: Colonel Louis Charles Gregoire Maignet
- 1840: Colonel Francis Eustache Fulque
- 1848: Colonel Morin

Commanders of the regiment of the Imperial Guard Guides

- 1852: Colonel Fleury
- 1860: Colonel de Montaigu
- 1866: Colonel Joachim Murat
- 1870: Colonel de Percin de Northumberlain

Commanders of the 9th Hussars since 1871

- 1871: Colonel Friant
- 1875: Colonel Gail
- 1884: Colonel Plessis
- 1889: Colonel Ozenne
- 1898: Colonel Devezeaux de Rancougne
- 1906: Colonel Bremond d'Ars
- 1907: Colonel Villeneuve-Bargemon
- 1912: Colonel Burette
- 1918: Colonel Bezard
- 1956: Colonel Lizeray
- 1957: Colonel Delage-Luget
- 1959: Colonel Chazelles
- 1961: Colonel Tartinville
- 1962: Colonel Abrial
- 1964: Colonel Poumarede
- 1965: Lieutenant Colonel Mazarguil
- 1967: Lieutenant Colonel Royer
- 1970: Lieutenant Colonel Lanurien
- 1971: Lieutenant Colonel Aigueperse
- 1972: Lieutenant Colonel Huon de Kermadec
- 1975: Lieutenant Colonel Preaud
- 1977: Colonel Dupont Dinechin
