= 46th Infantry Regiment (France) =

French Army regiment

- 46e régiment d'infanterie
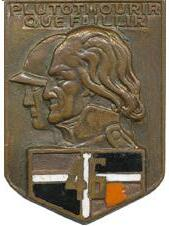
- insignia
- Active: 1644–1997
- Country: France
- Branch: Territorial Army
- Type: Infantry
- Garrison/HQ: Paris
- Motto(s): Plutôt mourir que faillir (Death before dishonour)
- Anniversaries: 28 June
- Engagements: Russian Campaign; World War I World War II

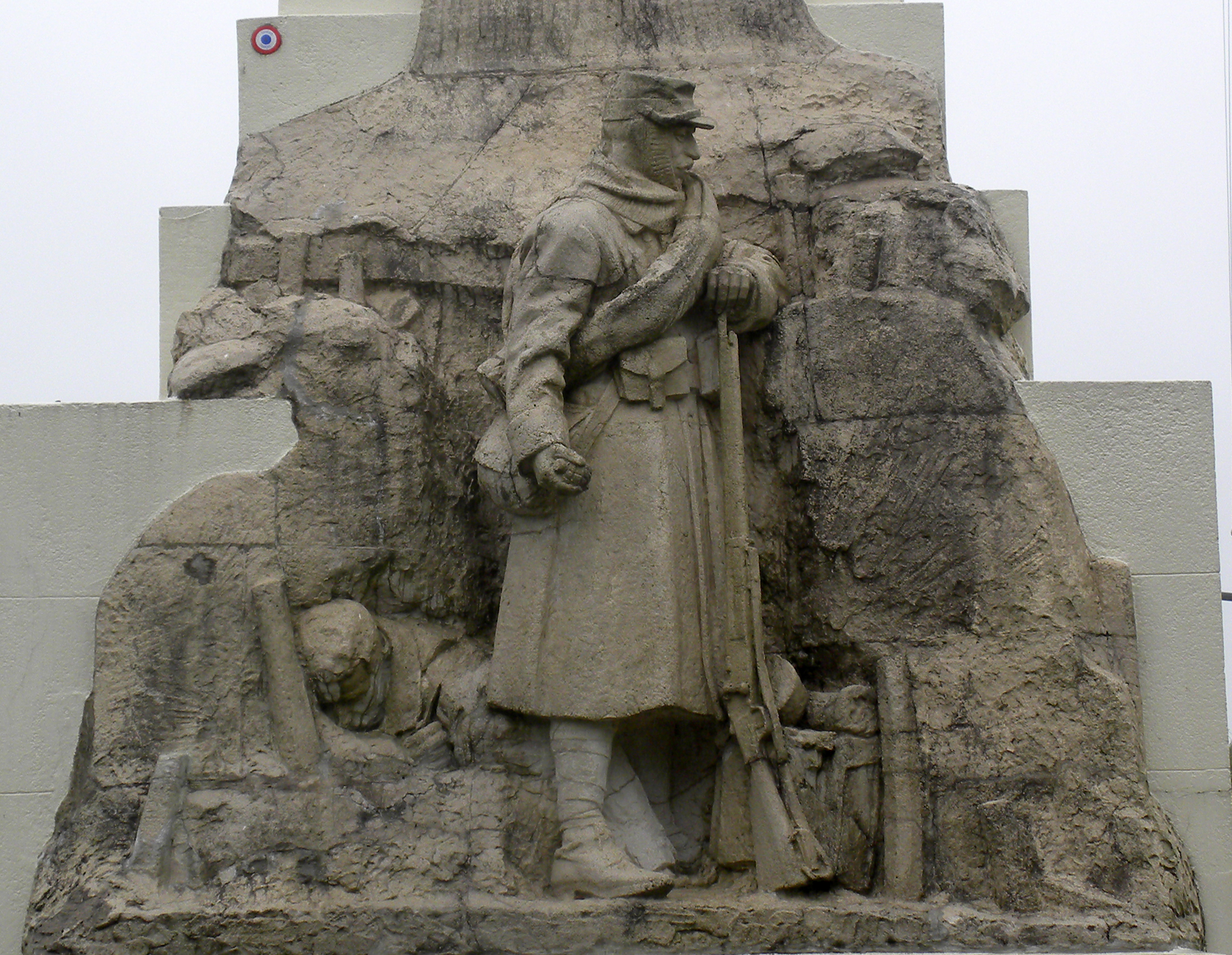
Detail from the Butte de Vauquois Monument, honouring those killed in 1915 from the 46th, 76th and 89th regiments of infantry.

The 46th Infantry Regiment an infantry regiment of the French Army. During the whole of the First World War it was part of the 10th Infantry Division. It was initially based in Paris. It saw action during the First World War, particularly during the Argonne offensive, where, in October 1914—along with the rest of the division—it saw heavy fighting and suffered heavy casualties. It took part in the Battle of Vauquois in February the following year, where, the regimental band—playing La Marseillaise for the 46th, 76th, and 89th as they attacked—were among the first to be killed. The regiment's standard bearer was Collignon, a former councillor of state, while its adjutant was Maurice Cazeneuve, tenor of the Opéra-Comique. Both were killed in action at Vauquois. During the Battle of Verdun in May it was commanded by Lieutenant Gustave Cohen.

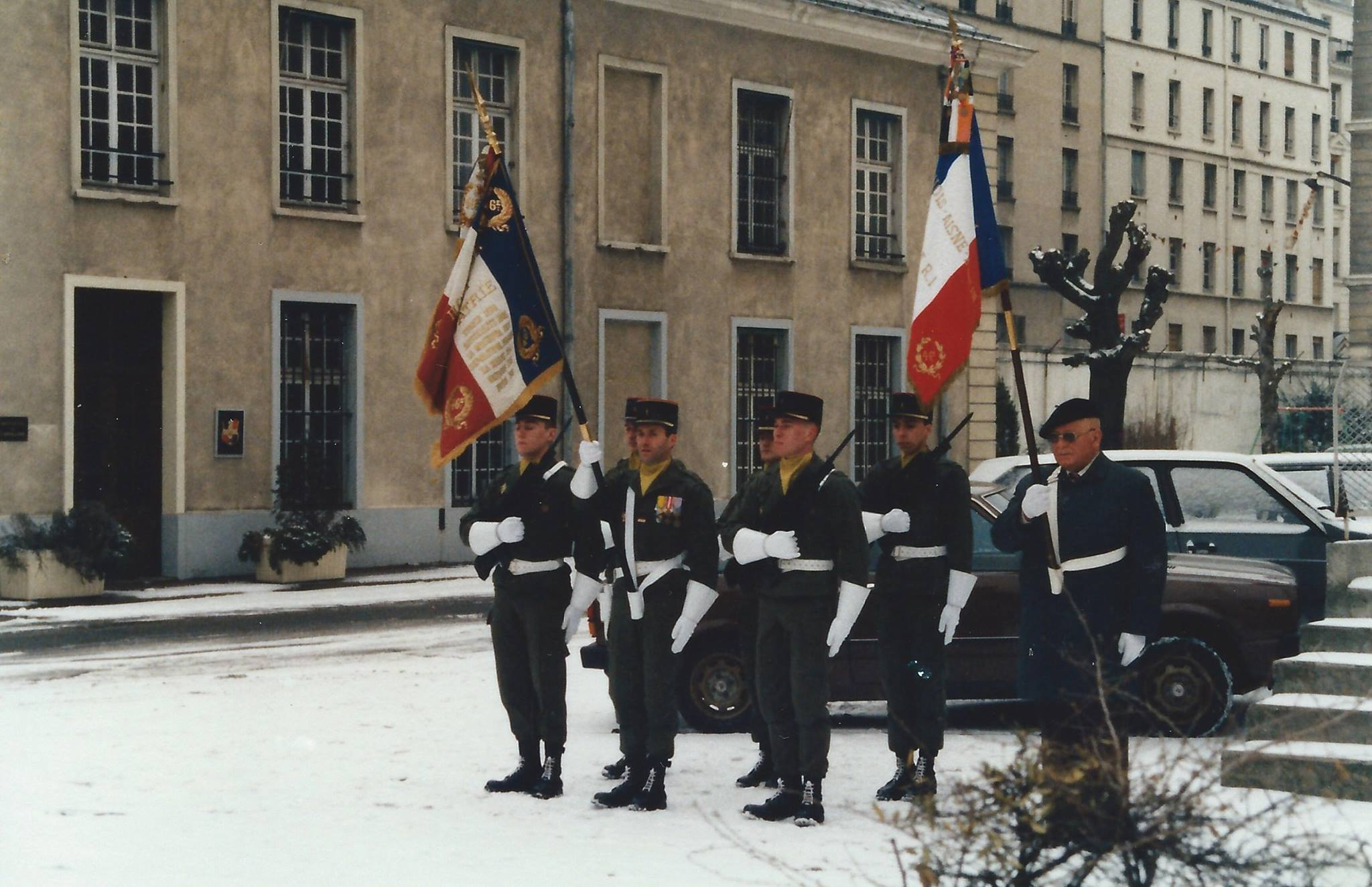
The flag guard of the 46th RI in 1986 at the Barracks Mortier in Paris before taking up arms at the Arc de Triomphe.

After the end of the Second World War, the regiment was disbanded on 30 April 1946, becoming the 46th Infantry Battalion of the 10th Demi-Brigade Infantry.

Reporting to the French Forces in Berlin from November 1947, after the Quadripartite Agreement on Berlin, it was stationed at Quartier-Napoléon with the 11th Regiment of Hunters. These two units were “successor” to the Fallschirm-Panzer-Division 1. Hermann Göring. Having become a regiment again, the 46th RI was dissolved on September 14, 1994.

It was recreated on July 1, 1995, as a reserve regiment associated with the 24th Infantry Regiment of Vincennes. It is responsible for missions of protection of the populations and assistance to the authorities before final dissolution on June 30, 1997.
