= VDP Lorraine 28 =

French troop transport

- Type: Troop transport
- Place of origin: France

Service history
- Used by: France
- Wars: World War II

Production history
- Designer: Lorraine
- Designed: 1934
- Manufacturer: Lorraine
- Produced: 1937 - 1939
- No. built: 404

Specifications
- Mass: 3,708 kg (8,175 lb)
- Length: 4.84 m (15 ft 11 in)
- Width: 1.75 m (5 ft 9 in)
- Height: 2.08 m (6 ft 10 in)
- Crew: one
- Engine: Lorraine 4-cylinder engine 55 hp
- Payload capacity: 2,720 kg (6,000 lb); 10 men
- Ground clearance: 33 cm (13 in)
- Fuel capacity: 110 litres
- Operational range: 300 km (190 mi)
- Maximum speed: 60 km/h (37 mph)

The VDP Lorraine 28 or Voiture de Dragons Portés Lorraine 28 ("Mechanized Dragoons Vehicle Lorraine 28") is a six-wheeled all-terrain troop transport developed by the Lorraine Company in the 1930s and used by the French army during World War II. Mainly equipping mechanized cavalry units, most vehicles were captured or destroyed during the Battle of France.

== Development ==
In the late 1920s, the French Army embarked on a program of partial motorization of its cavalry units, with the aim of transforming the cyclist battalion of each cavalry division into a Bataillon de Dragons Portés or BDP ("Mechanized Dragoon Battalion"). From 1929-32, these battalions were progressively equipped with Citroën-Kégresse halftracks; however, during exercises, it was found that theses had several deficiencies, chiefly low speed and a lack of protection for their passengers.

In January 1931, the military launched a procurement program for an armored transport, specifying the need for a vehicle with a capacity for 7 passengers, armor between 6-7mm, an open top and a low profile of less than 180 cm. Three companies submitted designs: The Renault URK, Berliet VDPK and Citroën-Kégresse P 26A. Ultimately, it was found that the specification did not correspond to the actual needs of the dragons portés and it was decided that capacity and speed should take priority over armor in future designs.

In this context, in 1932 the cavalry began seeking a new vehicle specially designed for the needs of the dragoon regiments of the light mechanized divisions (Division Légère Mécanique, DLM). This vehicle was to have capacity for 10 passengers in order to transport an entire squad altogether. The basis for the new vehicle, developed by Lorraine, was the 6 x 4 truck chassis developed by Tatra and used under license.

The design was submitted in 1934 and tested until 1936. Though slightly less powerful that the contemporary Laffly S 35 C, the VDP 28 was favorably assessed due to its solid chassis and low weight, which contributed to lower fuel consumption in rough terrain.

== Production ==
Two orders for a total of 370 vehicles were placed in 1937, in order to equip the 4th Mechanized Dragoon Regiment (4e Régiment de Dragons Portés, 4e RDP) and the 5e and 17e BCP, which were to be attached to the new armored brigades being formed at that time, centered on the new Char B1 heavy tank. A further order for 32 vehicles of a modified type was also placed in order to equip the engineer units of the DLM. A total of 404 vehicles would ultimately be manufactured.

Several derivatives were produced – 8 VDPs were used as fuel and water tankers, a number were built as command vehicles with radio equipment, and two were equipped with armor plating for use in Morocco. A single example was tested as a mobile anti-aircraft platform, with a cut-down cabin and a 13.2 mm Hotchkiss anti-aircraft machinegun mounted on the rear.

== Operational history ==
The VDP Lorraine entered service in 1937, initially equipping a single battalion of the 4e RDP. Deliveries were not completed until the beginning of 1939. No further vehicles would be ordered as, in October 1937, the army concluded that the Laffly S 20 TL, with its more powerful motor, offered better off-road performance.

At the time of the German invasion of France in May 1940, the 4e RDP and the engineers of the 1st Light Mecahnized Division (1ère Division Légère Mécanique, 1ère DLM) remained fully-equipped with the VDP Lorraine 28, which was employed during the unit’s advance to Holland and the subsequent allied retreat towards Dunkirk, with most or all vehicles lost during the campaign. The VDPs of the 5e and 17e BCP were fully or partially replaced by the halftrack VBCP Lorraine 38L before the campaign, while the 12th Army Corps Reconnaissance Group (12e Groupe de Reconnaissance de Corps d'Armée, 12e GRCA), which fought at Stonne, was reequipped with VDP Lorraine 28s to provide transport capacity for the unit’s heavy weapons squadron.
