= Anglure =

- Commune
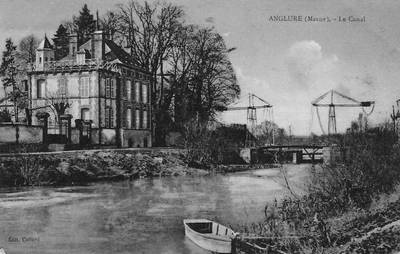
- Anglure in the 19th century

- Coat of arms
- Location of Anglure
- Location within France Location within Grand Est
- Coordinates: 48°35′09″N 3°48′54″E
- Country: France
- Region: Grand Est
- Department: Marne
- Arrondissement: Épernay
- Canton: Vertus-Plaine Champenoise
- Intercommunality: Sézanne-Sud Ouest Marnais

Government
  - Mayor (2020–2026): Frédéric Espinasse
- Area^{1}: 8.05 km^{2} (3.11 sq mi)
- Elevation: 76 m (249 ft)
- Population (2023): 777
  - Density: 96.5/km^{2} (250/sq mi)
- Time zone: UTC+01:00 (CET)
  - Summer (DST): UTC+02:00 (CEST)
- INSEE/Postal code: 51009 /51260
- ^{1} French Land Register data, which excludes lakes, ponds, glaciers > 1 km^{2} (0.386 sq mi or 247 acres) and river estuaries.

Anglure (French pronunciation: [ɑ̃ɡlyʁ]) is a commune in the Marne department in northeastern France.

== Population ==
Historical population
Year	Pop.	±% p.a.
1968	700	—
1975	785	+1.65%
1982	834	+0.87%
1990	855	+0.31%
1999	862	+0.09%
2007	893	+0.44%
2012	826	−1.55%
2017	879	+1.25%
2023	777	−2.03%
Source: INSEE

== See also ==
- Communes of the Marne department
