= Asnan =

- Commune
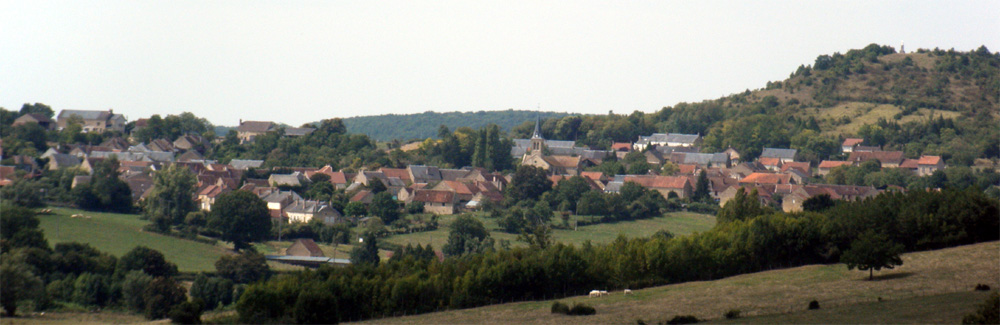
- A general view of Asnan

- Coat of arms
- Location of Asnan
- Location within France Location within Bourgogne-Franche-Comté
- Coordinates: 47°18′35″N 3°33′13″E
- Country: France
- Region: Bourgogne-Franche-Comté
- Department: Nièvre
- Arrondissement: Clamecy
- Canton: Corbigny
- Intercommunality: CC Tannay-Brinon-Corbigny

Government
  - Mayor (2020–2026): Patrick Riolino
- Area^{1}: 4.77 km^{2} (1.84 sq mi)
- Highest elevation: 393 m (1,289 ft)
- Lowest elevation: 223 m (732 ft)
- Population (2023): 118
  - Density: 24.7/km^{2} (64.1/sq mi)
- Time zone: UTC+01:00 (CET)
  - Summer (DST): UTC+02:00 (CEST)
- INSEE/Postal code: 58015 /58420
- ^{1} French Land Register data, which excludes lakes, ponds, glaciers > 1 km^{2} (0.386 sq mi or 247 acres) and river estuaries.

Asnan (French pronunciation: [anɑ̃]) is a commune in the Nièvre department in central France.

== Population ==
Historical population
Year	Pop.	±% p.a.
1968	199	—
1975	172	−2.06%
1982	163	−0.76%
1990	145	−1.45%
1999	137	−0.63%
2007	138	+0.09%
2012	129	−1.34%
2017	125	−0.63%
2023	118	−0.96%
Source: INSEE

== See also ==
- Communes of the Nièvre department
