= Mourmelon-le-Petit =

- Commune
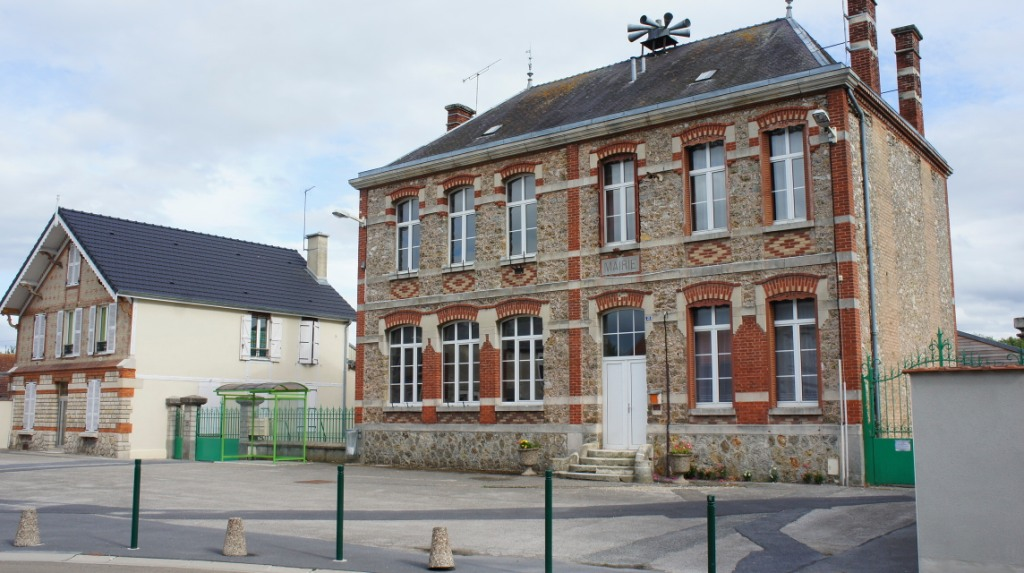
- The town hall in Mourmelon-le-Petit

- Coat of arms
- Location of Mourmelon-le-Petit
- Location within France Location within Grand Est
- Coordinates: 49°07′50″N 4°18′37″E
- Country: France
- Region: Grand Est
- Department: Marne
- Arrondissement: Châlons-en-Champagne
- Canton: Mourmelon-Vesle et Monts de Champagne
- Intercommunality: CA Châlons-en-Champagne

Government
  - Mayor (2020–2026): René Maizieres
- Area^{1}: 12.19 km^{2} (4.71 sq mi)
- Highest elevation: 151 m (495 ft)
- Lowest elevation: 96 m (315 ft)
- Population (2023): 803
  - Density: 65.9/km^{2} (171/sq mi)
- Time zone: UTC+01:00 (CET)
  - Summer (DST): UTC+02:00 (CEST)
- INSEE/Postal code: 51389 /51400
- ^{1} French Land Register data, which excludes lakes, ponds, glaciers > 1 km^{2} (0.386 sq mi or 247 acres) and river estuaries.

Mourmelon-le-Petit (French pronunciation: [muʁməlɔ̃ lə pəti]) is a commune in the Marne department in north-eastern France.

== See also ==
- Communes of the Marne department
