= 4th Dragoon Regiment (France) =

- 4^{e} régiment de dragons
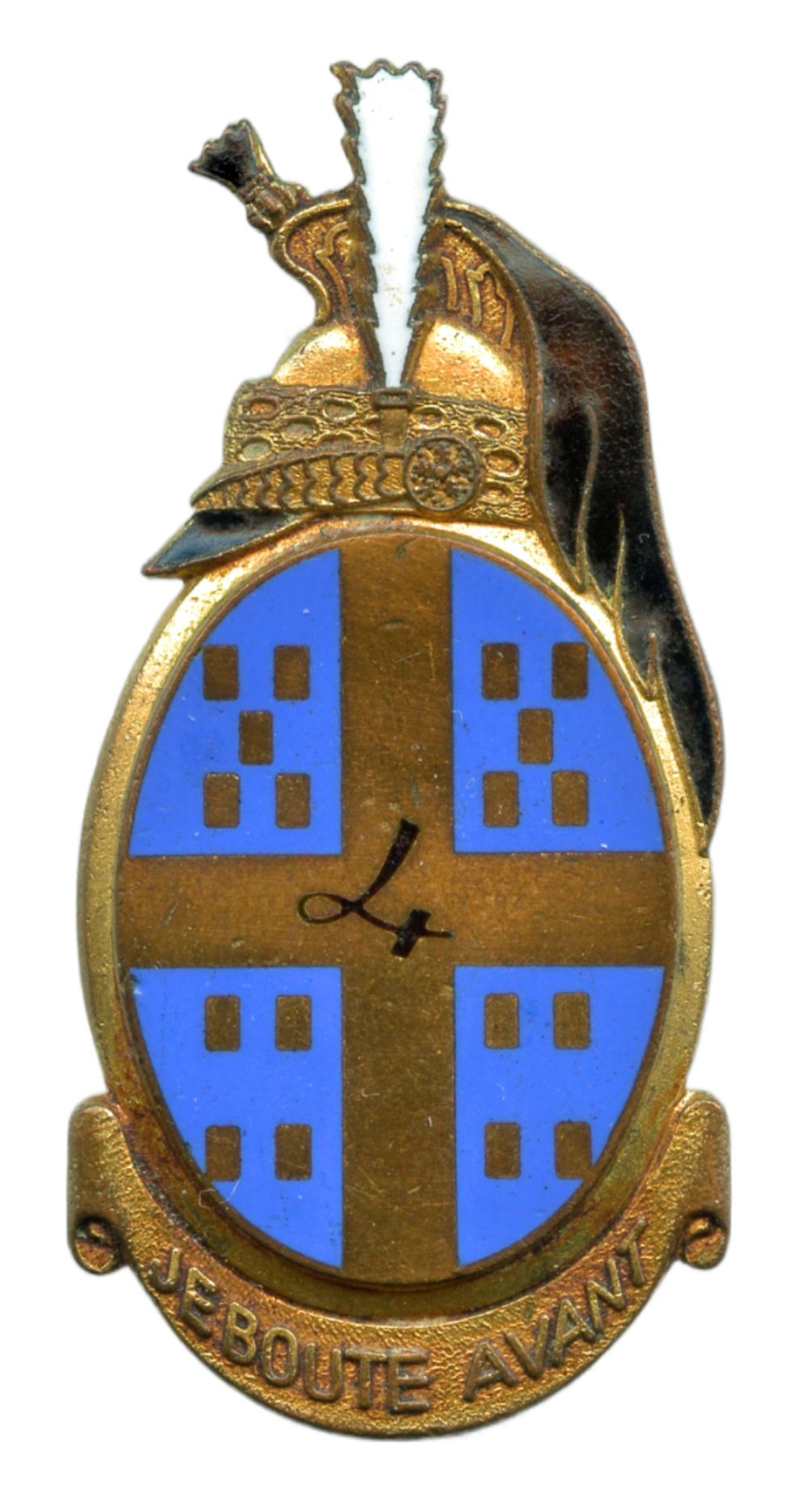
- Regimental insignia
- Active: 1667–2014
- Country: France
- Branch: French Army
- Type: Cavalry
- Mottos: Je boute avant (French) Spes altera Martis (Latin) Un autre espoir de Mars (French)
- Equipment: Leclerc
- Engagements: Napoleonic Wars; World War I World War II; French Indochina War; Algerian War; Gulf War; War on terror
- Battle honours: Valmy 1792; Eylau 1807; Badajoz 1811; Nangis 1814; La Mortagne 1914; L'Avre 1918; Flandres 1918; L'Aisne 1918; Indochine 1947–1954; AFN 1952-1962; Koweït 1990–1991

The 4th Dragoon Regiment (French: 4^{e} Régiment de dragons, 4^{e} RD) was a cavalry unit created during the Ancien Regime and was dissolved on July 11, 2014.

== Creation and different names ==
- 1667 : creation of the 4^{e} Régiment de dragons under the designation of Beaupré-Cavalry
- 1684 : Chartres-Cavalry
- 1724 : Clermont-Prince-Cavalry
- 1771 : Marche-Prince-Cavalry
- 1776 : Conti-Dragons
- 1791 : 4^{e} Régiment de dragons
- 1814 : 2^{e} Régiment de dragons de la Reine
- 1815 : 4^{e} Régiment de dragons
- 1815 : dissolution of the regiment
- 1816 : creation under the designation of Régiment des dragons de la Gironde
- 1825 : 4^{e} Régiment de dragons
- 1926 : dissolution of the regiment
- 1929 : creation of the regiment under the designation of 4^{e} bataillon de dragons portés from the 4^{e} groupe de chasseurs cyclistes
- 1935 : 4^{e} Régiment de dragons portés
- 1940 : dissolution of the regiment
- 1947 : creation of the regiment under the designation of 4^{e} bataillon de dragons portés
- 1948 : 4^{e} Régiment de dragons portés
- 1950 : 4^{e} Régiment de dragons
- 1954 : dissolution of the regiment
- 1955 : creation of 4^{e} Régiment de dragons
- 1962 : dissolution of the regiment
- 1968 : creation of 4^{e} Régiment de dragons
- 1990 : squadrons group of 4^{e} Régiment de dragons
- 1994 : dissolution of the regiment
- July 27, 2009 : recreation of 4^{e} Régiment de dragons by designation change nomination of the 1^{er}-11^{e} Régiment de cuirassiers.
- July 11, 2014 : dissolution.

== History ==
=== Ancien Regime ===
The unit took part in all campaigns of the Ancien Regime:

- Guerre de Hollande (1672–1678)
- Guerre de la Ligue d'Augsbourg (1689–1697)
- War of the Spanish Succession (1701–1713)
- War of the Quadruple Alliance (1719)
- War of the Polish Succession (1733–1736)
- War of the Austrian Succession(1740–1748)
- Seven Years' War (1756–1763)

=== Wars of the Revolution & Empire ===
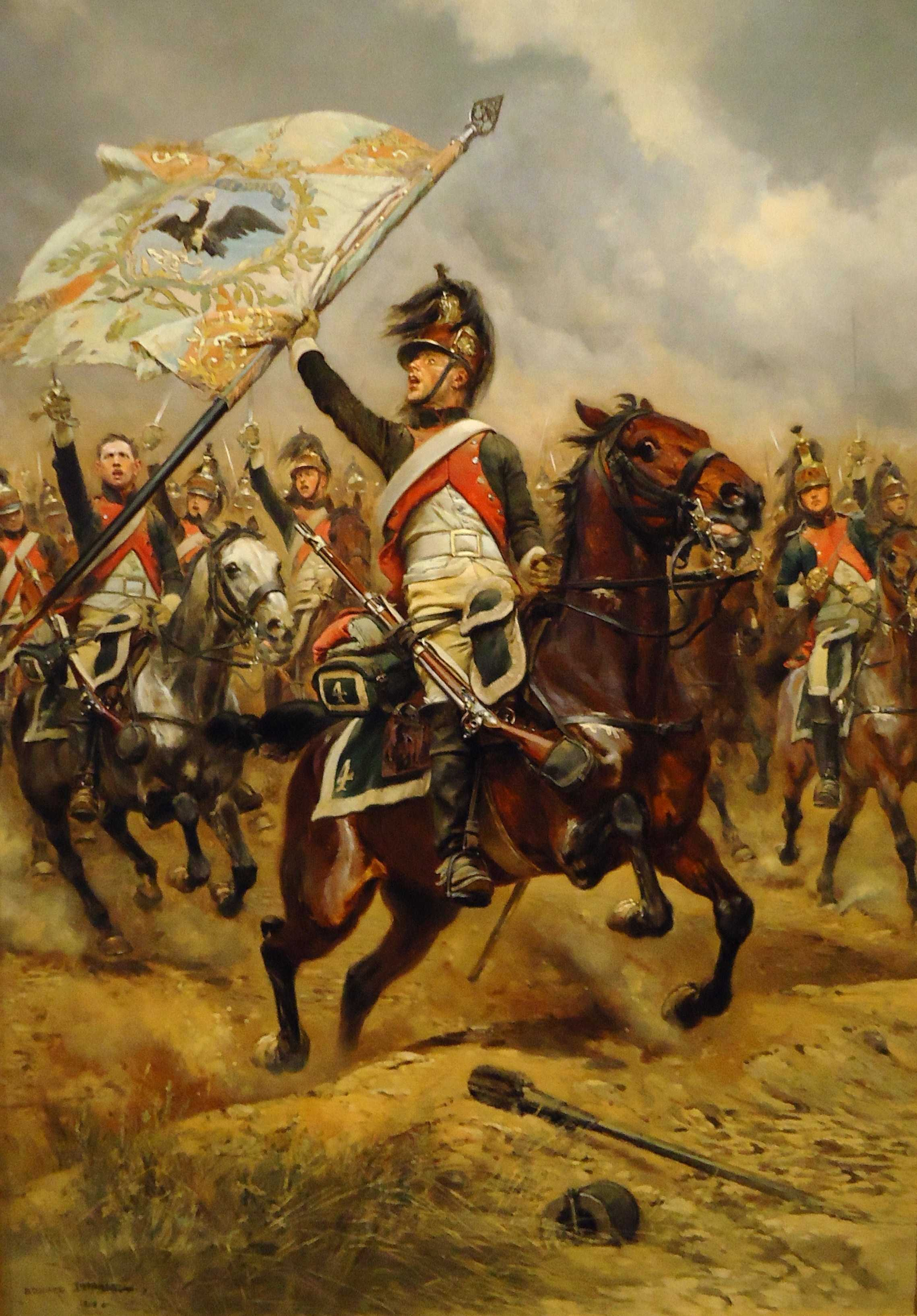
4^{e} Dragons at the Battle of Jena–Auerstedt.

- 1792
  - Battle of Valmy
  - Order of battle of the Army of the Moselle in the expedition of Trèves
- 1793
  - Battle of Wissembourg
- 1796
  - Armée de Rhin-et-Moselle
  - Battle of Aldenhoven
- 1805 : War of the Third Coalition
  - Battle of Ulm
  - Battle of Austerlitz
- 1806 : War of the Fourth Coalition
  - Battle of Golymin
- 1807 : War of the Fourth Coalition
  - Battle of Eylau
  - Corps d'observation de la Gironde
- 1808 : Peninsular War
  - Battle of Medellín
- 1809
  - Battle of Alcantara
- 1811
  - Battle of the Gebora
  - Battle of Albuera
- 1813 : German Campaign of 1813
  - Battle of Leipzig
- 1814 : Campaign in north-east France (1814)
  - Battle of Bar-sur-Aube
  - Battle of Mormant

=== 1815 to 1848 ===
The unit was designated as the 2^{e} Régiment des dragons de la Reine under the first restoration, then readopted the old designation during the 100 days; following the abdication of Napoleon I^{er}, the unit was designated as dragons de la Gironde, then retook the number designation 4 in 1825.

=== Second Empire ===
The regiment led life in the garrison without any history.

=== 1871 to 1914 ===
In 1870, the regiment participated to combats of the Armée de la Loire.
During the Paris Commune in 1871, the regiment participated with the Armée Versaillaise.

=== World War I ===
The regiment joined in 1913 the 12^{e} brigade de dragons at Commercy and Sézanne (2^{e} division de cavalerie from August 1914 to November 1918). The 2nd Cavalry Division is attached to the cavalry corps of général Conneau until September 1, 1914.

- In 1914, the regiment covered the 1^{er} and 2^{e} armées from August 4 to 15 1914. At La Mortagne on August 25, two squadrons hold the wooden forest of de Lalau alongside the chasseur à pied. Under the orders of colonel Dolfus, the regiment apprehended the villages of Chazelles and Gondrexon on November 2, and ten days later, those of Saint-Sauveur and Val-et-Châtillon. After the battle of the Marne, the regiment joined the trenches.
- In 1915, the regiment led combats on Lorraine.
- In 1916 in Alsace until June, then in the valley of La Somme east to Amiens, ready to exploit by horse a successful anticipation. Following the failure of the offensive, the regiment was back in the trenches.
- From November 1916 to January 1917, the regiment joined the trenches of Soissons. At the beginning of the month of March, the regiment is the camp of Mailly. On April 17, the regiment assisted to the Second Battle of the Aisne without taking part in the battle. The regiment joined the sector of Ludes, east of Reims until January 1918. In the meantime, in June and September, the regiment was in the outskirts of Paris to fend off any internal complications. In February 1918, the regiment was summoned for the same reasons at Valence, then Saint-Étienne.
- Following the German spring offensive end of Mars on Amiens, the regiment let combats in the Flandres at mont des Cats. The regiment was successful at Locre from April 26 to 29 1918, enduring the loss of 80% of effectifs and being cited at the orders of the armed forces. Following a forced march of 200 km, the regiment led combats on Ourcq and apprehended Montmarlet and Montemafroy. The regiment was seen attributed a second citation at the orders of the armed forces, and the fourragere with colors of the croix de guerre 1914–1918.

=== Interwar period ===
From 1918 to 1923, the regiment garrisoned at Castres, then Carcasonne where a dissolution was placed in effect in 1926. Recreated in 1929 under the designation of 4^{e} bataillon de dragons portés 4^{e} BDP, the regiment was formed at Trèves from elements of the 4^{e} groupe de chasseurs cyclistes. The regiment was equipped with chenilettes Citroën, automatic machine guns AMR and side-cars. In 1935, the regiment was designated as 4^{e} régiment de dragons portés and garrisoned at Verdun. Beginning in 1937, the regiment was reequipped with VDP Lorraine 28 all-terrain transport vehicles. It was the only cavalry regiment to be fully-equipped with vehicles of this type.

=== World War II ===
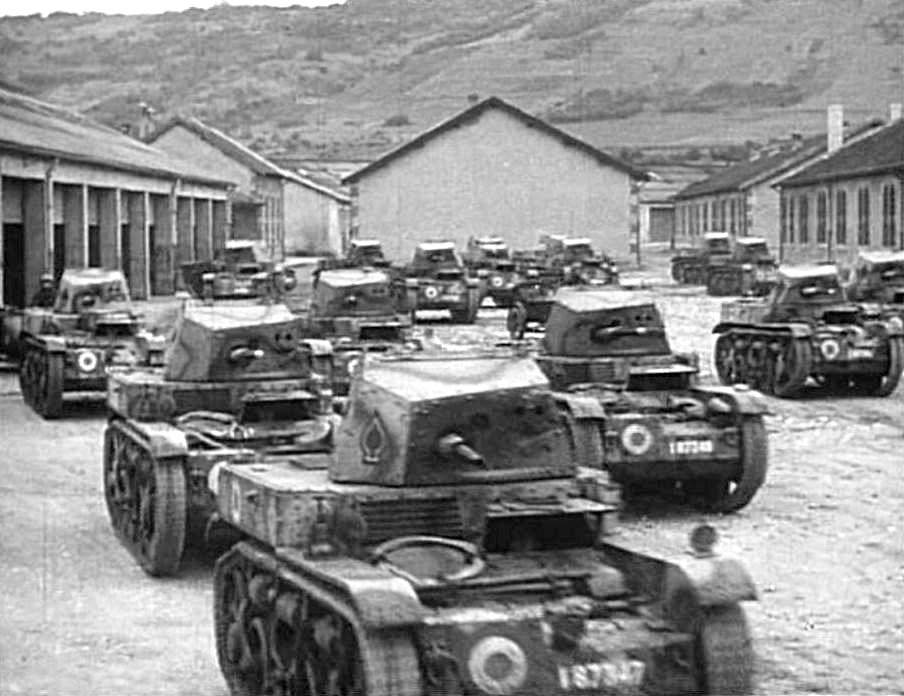
A group of AMR 35 armed with Hotchkiss M1929 machine gun of the 4^{e} Régiment de dragons portés of the 1st Light Mechanized Division. The front vehicle is the second produced and features the grand rosettes, typical of this unit since 1938.

On May 10, 1940, the regiment, with the rest of the 1st Light Mechanized Division, made way to Holland, region of Tilburg. On May 12 and 13 and following intense combats, the regiment took a hard turn on the south of the Albert canal, then made way to France. The regiment was engaged in combat during the entire Battle of France. The regiment was dissolved on July 8, 1940 and was cited at the orders of the armed forces for conduit during the short campaign duration.

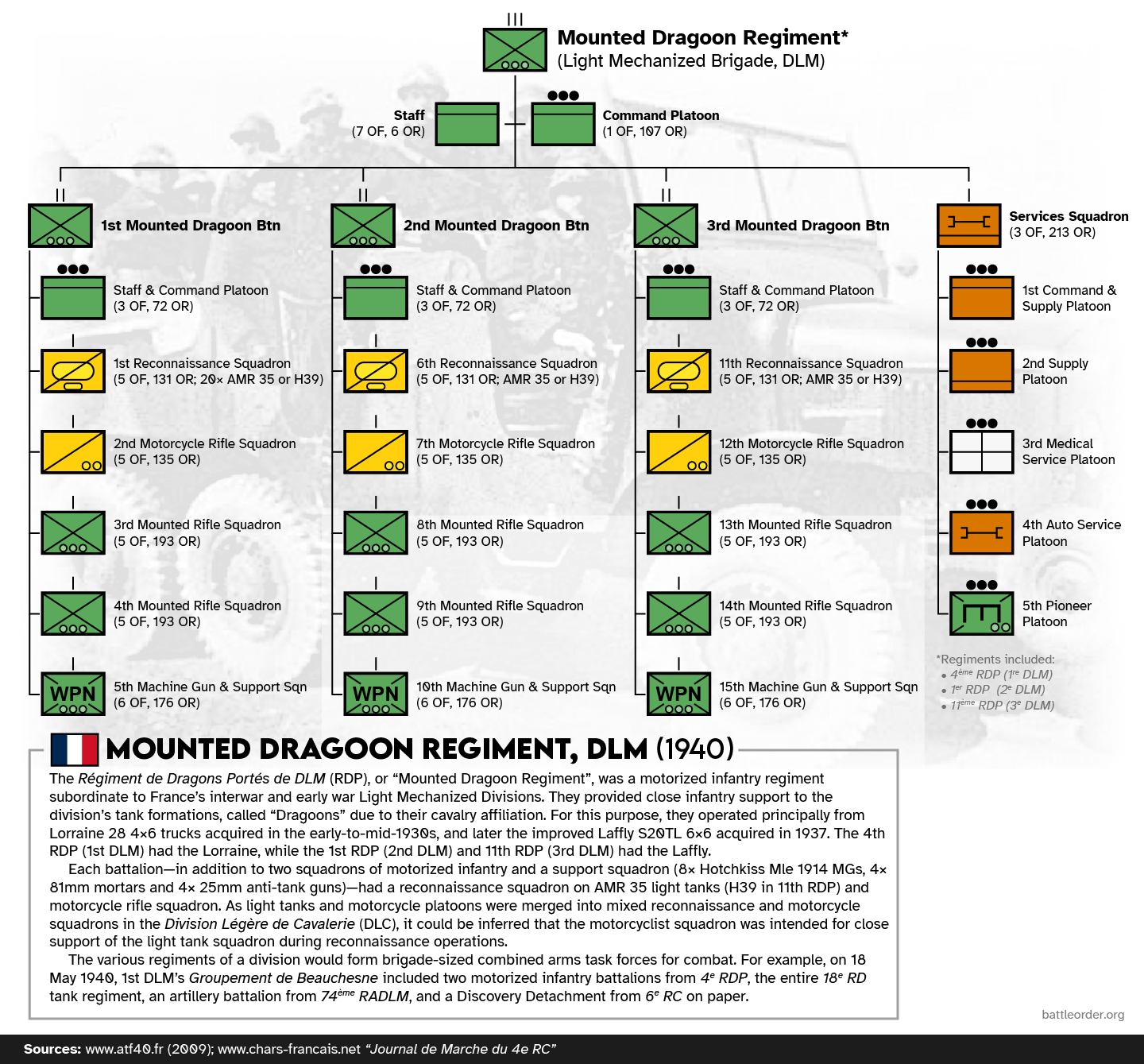
The organization of DLM Mounted Dragoon Regiments (RDP) during the Battle of France.

=== 1945 to 1994 ===
Recreated in February 1947 under the designation of 4^{e} bataillon de dragons portés, the battalion was sent to Tonkin on March 25 of the same year.
The battalion was sent to Cochinchine in 1948, on November 1, the battalion was redesignated as 4^{e} régiment de dragons portés.
The regiment became 4^{e} Régiment de dragons on February 16, 1950. On June 30, 1954, the regiment was dissolved after a 7-year presence in Indochina.
The regiment was cited twice at the orders of the armed corps.
The 4^{e} Régiment de dragons was formed from elements of the 5th Armoured Division 5^{e} DB on November 15, 1955, in West Germany, then was sent to Algeria on June 19.
On April 28, 1968, at Olivet, the regiment was recreated and equipped with AMX-13 tanks, composed of two squadrons and two companies of VTT.
On June 30, 1979, the regiment was dissolved.
The regiment was recreated on September 1, 1979, at Mourmelon-le-Grand. The regiment was accordingly equipped with 54 AMX 30 B2. The first squadron of the regiment was professionalized and participated in Tchad to Operation Manta from January to June 1984. The regiment was entirely professionalized in 1990.
the 4^{e} dragons was the (heavy AMX-30 B2) armoured tank cavalry regiment of Division Daguet during the first Gulf War. The regiment participated to the principal mission of the division in liaison with the 3rd Marine Infantry Regiment 3^{e} RIMa. The regiment was cited at the orders of the armed forces and was awarded the croix de guerre des théâtres d’opérations extérieurs with palm.
The regiment participated in September 1992 within the United Nations cadres force FORPRONU. Strong with two units, the regiment participated to readying an infantry battalion acting in Croatia.
Dissolved in 1994, on June 28, 2006, the honor guard was entrusted to the combat training center at Mailly.

=== 2009 to 2014 ===
The 4^{e} Régiment de dragons was reactivated in 2009 by dissolution of the 1^{er}-11^{e} Régiment de cuirassiers de Carpiagne and equipped with Leclerc tanks. A part of the regiment was deployed to Lebanon at the corps of the United Nations Interim Force in Lebanon.

The regiment formed the composition of 7th Armoured Brigade. The 4^{e} RD, recreated on August 1, 2009, succeeded to the 1^{er}-11^{e} Régiment de cuirassiers de Carpiagne. The regiment was restructured in the summer of 2009 passing by an organization bi-bataillonnaire to a structure of 4 tank squadrons supported by a rear defensive base. Announced in the 2013 restructurations, the regiment was dissolved on July 11, 2014.

==== Subordinations ====
The regiment is subordinated to the 7th Armoured Brigade, a part component of terrestrial forces.

==== Compositions ====
- four Leclerc squadrons
- one logistics & command squadron
- one reserve squadron

==== Missions ====
In 2009, 70% of the regiment was deployed to Lebanon, Kosovo, Senegal and Afghanistan.

The plan Vigipirate constituted equally an important mission part for the regiment, assured all year long in Paris and in regions around France.

== Traditions & uniforms ==
The uniformed royal ordinance of 1786 fixed the uniforms of the Régiments de dragons. The uniform background is dark green (vert dragon). The uniforms are of a distinct color attributed to each regiment.

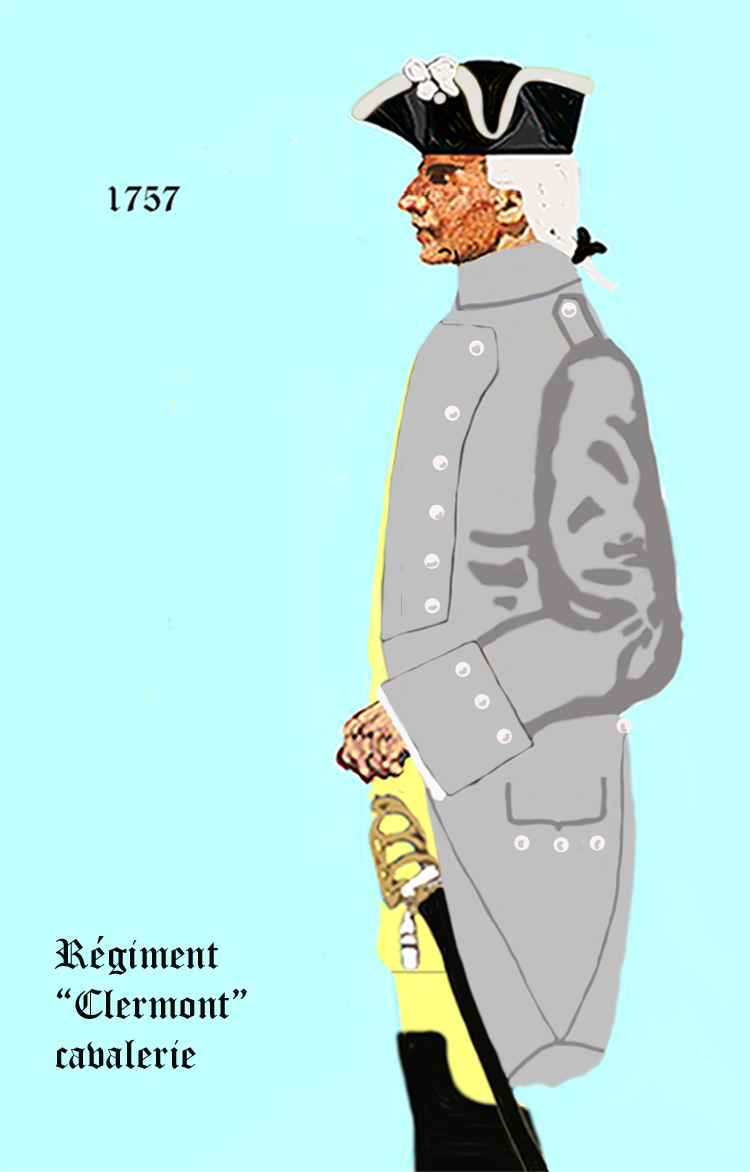
Clermont cavalry 1757

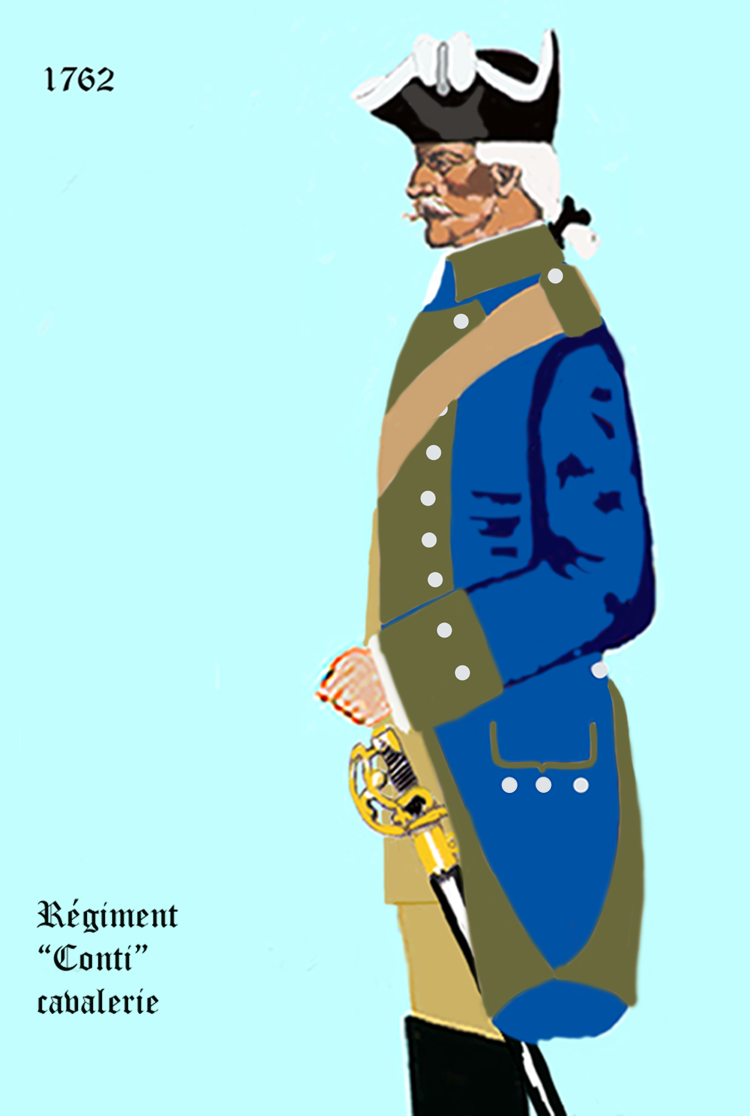
Conti cavalry 1762

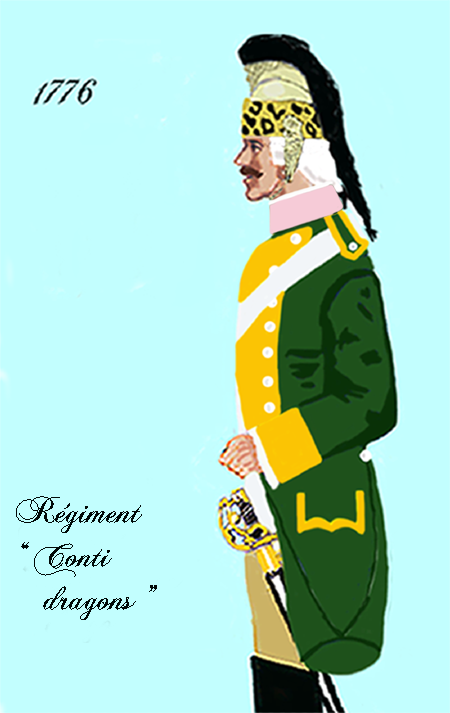
Conti dragons 1776

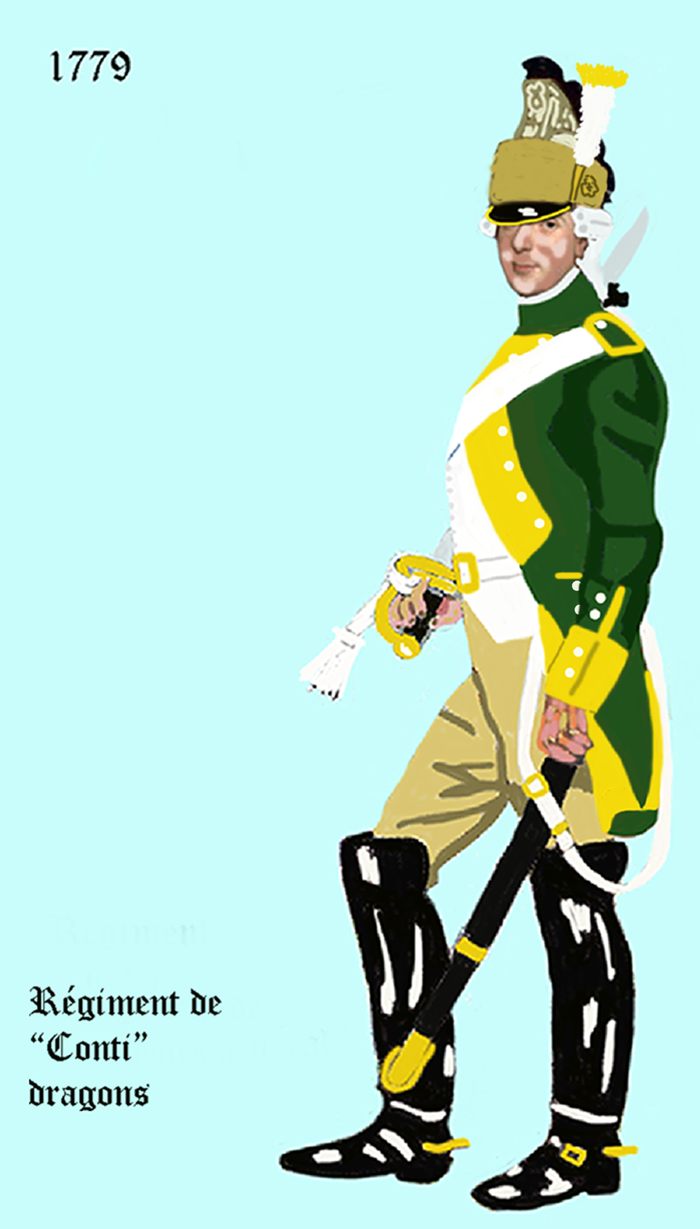
Conti dragons 1779

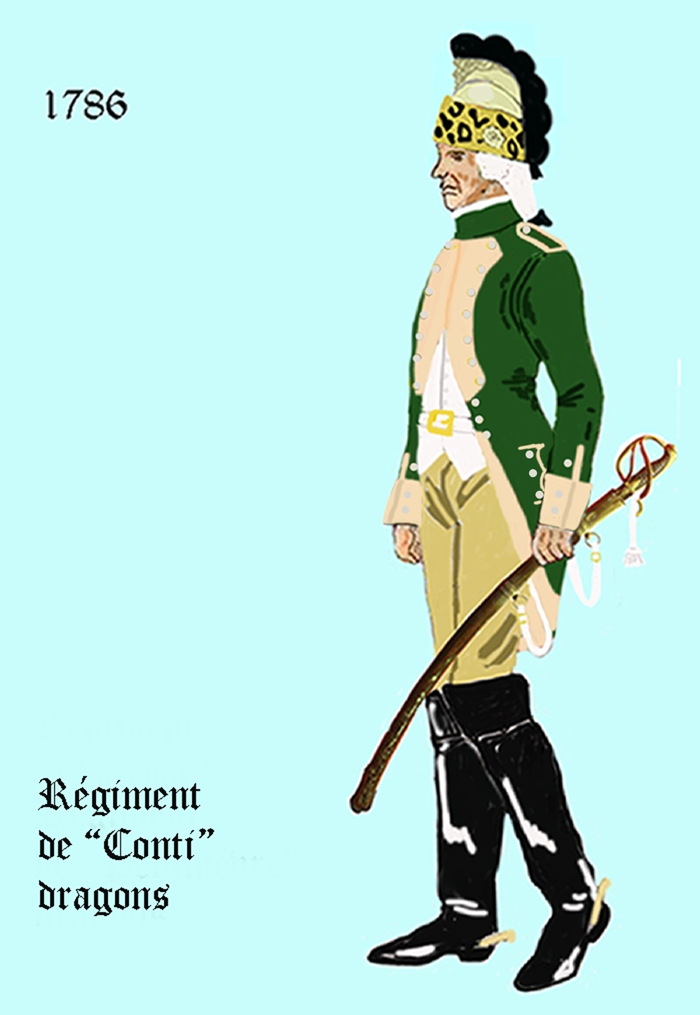
Conti dragons 1786

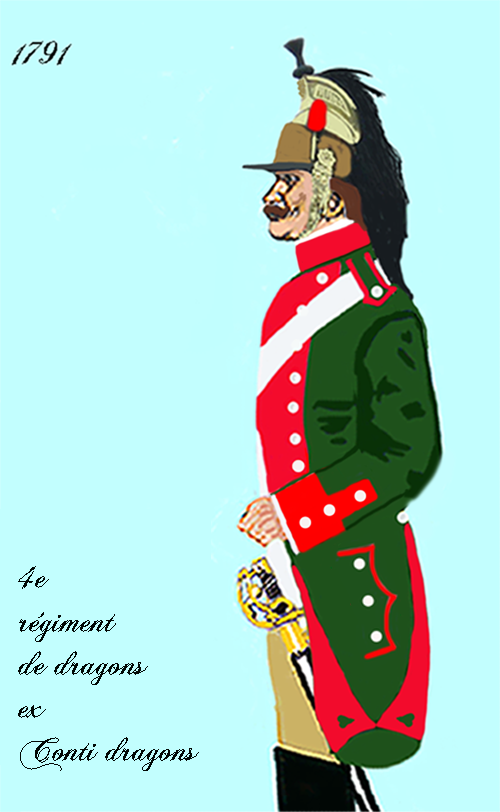
4^{e} dragons 1791

=== Regimental Colors ===
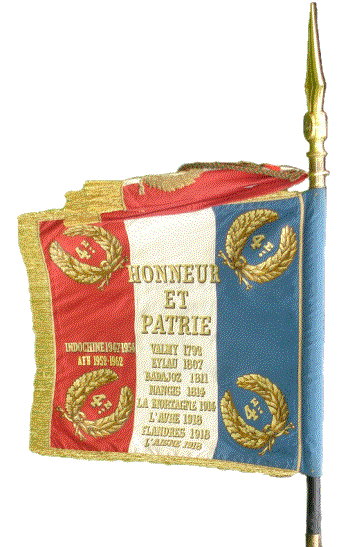
Regimental colors of the 4^{e} Régiment de dragons.

=== Decorations ===
The regimental colors of the 4^{e} Régiment de dragons is decorated with:

- Croix de guerre 1914–1918 with:
  - 2 palms
- Croix de guerre 1939-1945 with :
  - 1 palm
- Croix de guerre des théâtres d'opérations extérieures with:
  - 2 vermeil stars (for service in Indochina)
- Croix de guerre des théâtres d'opérations extérieures with :
  - 1 palm
- croix de la vaillance vietnamienne:
  - with 1 vermeil star

Fourragere:

- The regiment bears wearing the fourragere with colors of the croix de guerre 1914–1918.
Fourragère with colors of the croix de guerre 1914-1918

=== Honours ===
==== Battle Honours ====
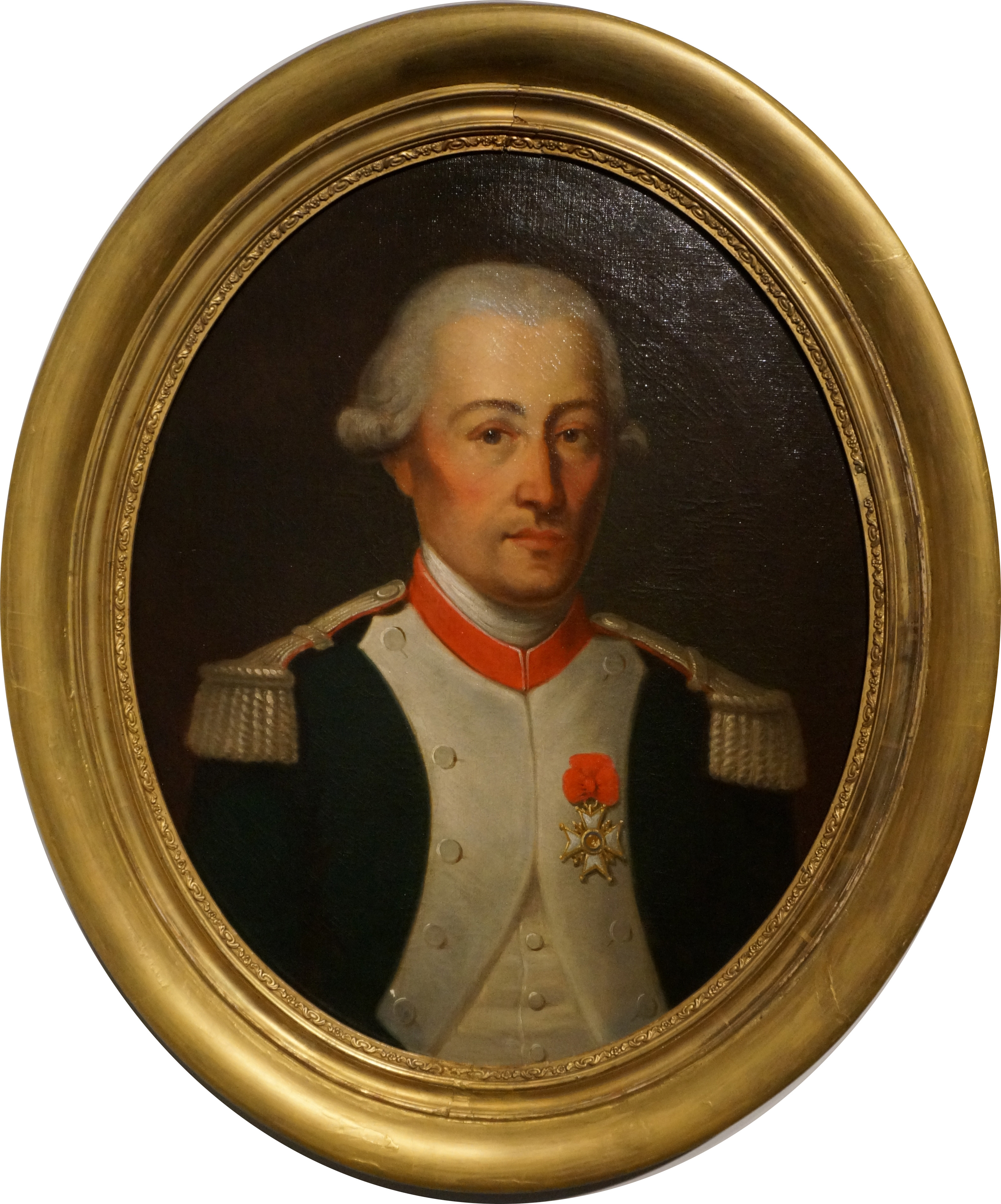
The Count de Migot as lieutenant-colonel of the regiment.

- Valmy 1792
- Eylau 1807
- Badajoz 1811
- Nangis 1814
- La Mortagne 1914
- L'Avre 1918
- Flandres 1918
- L'Aisne 1918
- Indochine 1947–1954
- AFN 1952-19623
- Koweït 1990–1991

== Regimental Commanders ==
- 1773–1781 : colonel Jean Baptiste Camille de Canclaux (**)
- 1791–1792 : Count Laurent de Migot
- 1800 : colonel Pierre Wattier
- 1806–1809 : colonel Auguste Étienne Marie Gourlez de Lamotte (**)
- 1809–1811 : colonel Pierre Joseph Farine du Creux (*)
- 1811–1814 : colonel Jean-Baptiste Bouquerot des Essarts
- 1865 : colonel Jolif du Coulombier
- 1876–1879 : colonel Génestet de Planhol
- 1884 : colonel Morin
- 1914 : colonel Durant de Mareuil
- 1914 : colonel Dolfus
- 1914–1915 : commandant Oré
- 1915–1918 : lieutenant-colonel de la Font
- 1956–1958 : colonel de Maupeou
- 1958–1960 : colonel de Sevelinges
- 1960–1962 : colonel Dumas
- 1962–1964 : colonel Rapenne
- ...
- ...
- 1968–1970 : colonel Mercier
- 1970–1972 : colonel Caulery
- 1972–1974 : colonel Robert
- 1974–1976 : colonel Duquesne
- 1976–1978 : colonel Chavanat
- 1978–1979 : colonel de Rolland
- 1979–1981 : colonel Maes
- 1981–1983 : colonel Carlier
- 1983–1985 : colonel Petit de Bantel
- 1985–1987 : colonel Choué de la Mettrie
- 1987–1989 : colonel Hablot
- 1989–1990 : colonel Gallineau
- 1990–1992 : colonel Bourret
- 1992–1994 : colonel Marchand
- 2009–2011 : colonel du Breil de Pontbriand
- 2011–2013 : colonel Baudouin
- 2013–2014 : lieutenant-colonel Le Carff

== Notable Officers & dragons ==
- général Maxime Weygand (1888), then a lieutenant.
