= ARL 44 =

French heavy tank and tank destroyer

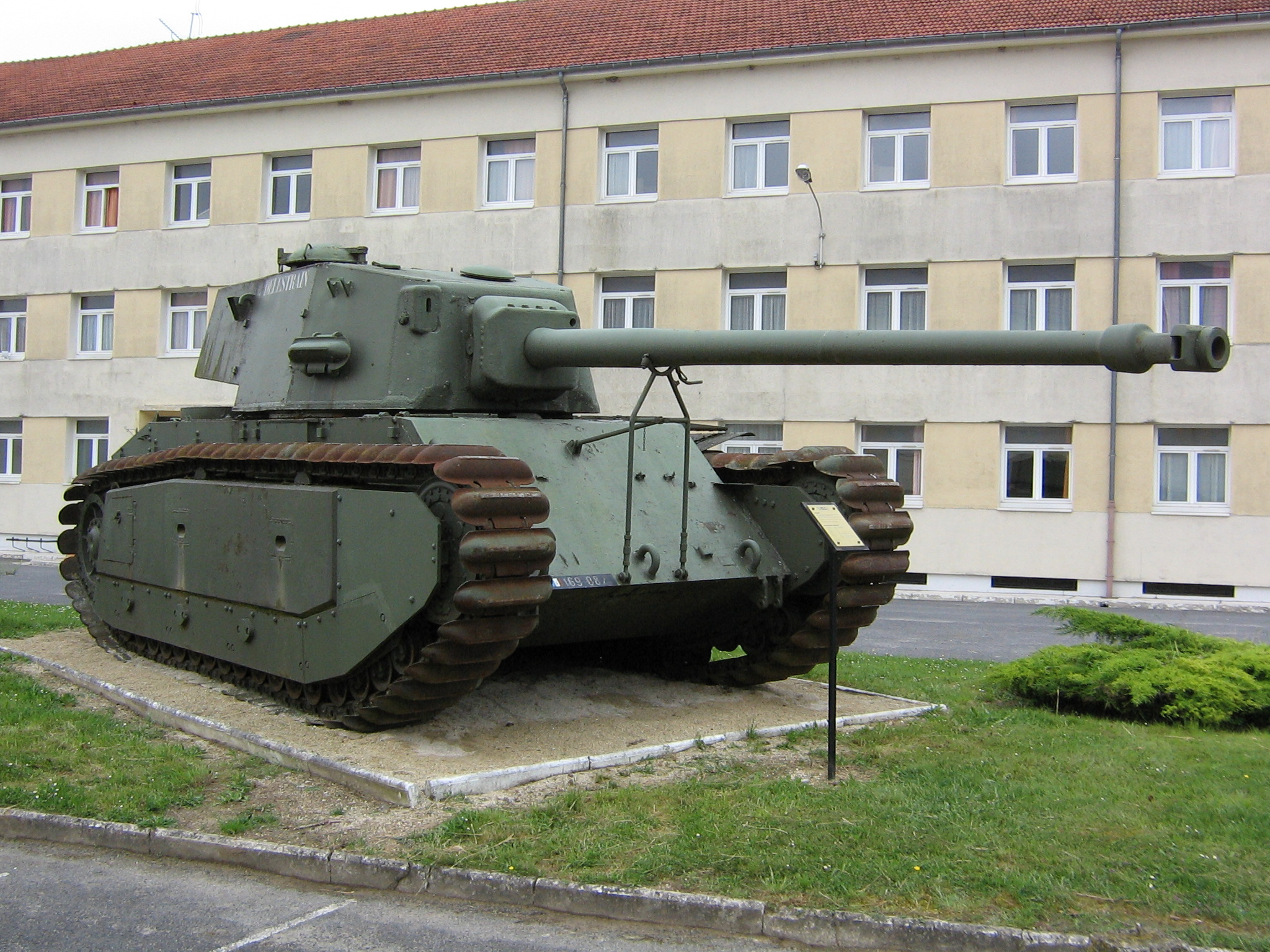
- The ARL 44 at Mourmelon-le-Grand
- Type: heavy tank, tank destroyer
- Place of origin: France

Service history
- Used by: France

Production history
- Designed: winter 1944 – summer 1947
- Produced: 1949–1951
- No. built: 60

Specifications
- Mass: 48 tonnes (53 short tons; 47 long tons)
- Length: 10.53 m (34 ft 7 in)
- Width: 3.40 m (11 ft 2 in)
- Height: 3.20 m (10 ft 6 in)
- Crew: 5
- Armor: Front: 120 mm (4.7 in); Side: 80 mm (3.1 in)
- Main armament: 1× 75 mm L/44(Prototype Variants) 1× 90 mm SA 45 gun (37 rounds)
- Secondary armament: 2× 7.5 mm MAC 31 Châtellerault machine guns
- Engine: Maybach HL 230; V-12 gasoline engine 575 hp
- Power/weight: 11.9 hp/tonne
- Suspension: vertical coil spring
- Fuel capacity: 1372 liter
- Operational range: 350 km (220 mi)
- Maximum speed: 37.2 km/h (23.1 mph)

The ARL 44 was a French heavy tank and tank destroyer, the development of which started just before the end of the Second World War. Prototypes used the ACL-1 turret. Later a Schneider turret was installed. Only sixty of these tanks were ever completed, from 1949 onwards. The type proved to be unsatisfactory and only entered limited service before being phased out in 1953.

== Development ==
During the German occupation some clandestine tank development took place in France, mostly limited to component design or the building of tracked chassis with either a pretended civilian use or with a Kriegsmarine destination. These efforts were coordinated by CDM (Camouflage du Matériel), a secret Vichy army organisation trying to produce matériel forbidden by the armistice conditions, with the ultimate goal of combining these components into the design of a possible future thirty ton battle tank, armed with a 75 mm gun. The projects were very disparate, including those for a trolleybus, the Caterpillar du Transsaharien (a regular cross-Sahara track and rail connection) and a tracked snow blower for the Kriegsmarine to be used in Norway. Firms involved were Laffly and Lorraine; also a military design team in occupied France, headed by Maurice Lavirotte, was active.

When in August 1944 Paris was liberated, the new provisional government of France did its utmost to regain the country's position as a great power, trying to establish its status as a full partner among the Allies by contributing as much as possible to the war effort. One of the means to accomplish this was to quickly restart tank production. Before the war France had been the world's second largest tank producer, behind the Soviet Union. On 9 October 1944, the Ministry of War decided to start production of a char de transition, 'transitional tank'.

However, French pre-war light and medium designs had become completely outdated and there was no way to quickly make up for the time lost and immediately improve their component quality. The Ministry hoped it might be possible to compensate for this by sheer size. A large and well-armed vehicle might still be useful, however obsolescent its individual parts were, especially as the British and Americans seemed to be behind Germany in heavy tank development, having no operational vehicles that were equal to the Tiger II in its combination of firepower and armour. An important secondary goal of the project was simply to ensure that France would in the future have a sufficient number of weapons engineers; if these could not be employed now, they would be forced to seek other occupations and much expertise would be lost.

Consequently, on 25 November it was decided to produce five hundred heavy tanks, to be designed by the Direction des Études et Fabrications d'Armement (DEFA) in which engineers from the former APX (the army Atelier de Puteaux) and AMX (the Atelier de Construction d'Issy-les-Moulineaux state factory) design teams were concentrated, and built by the Atelier de Construction de Rueil (ARL), the army workshop. Already in October it had been decided to name the type ARL 44. The specifications were not at first overly ambitious and called for a thirty-ton vehicle with 60 mm of armour and armed with a 75 mm SA modèle 1944 Long 70 gun, rendering a penetration of 80 mm steel at 1000 metres and developed by engineer Lafargue from the 75 mm CA 32 gun, conforming to the earlier CDM intentions. It was hoped that fifty vehicles could be delivered per month from May 1945 onwards.

On 28 December the order for the 75 mm tank was reduced to two hundred vehicles. The remaining three hundred would be produced after a choice had been made between two heavier armaments, the 90 mm CA modèle 1939 S with a muzzle velocity of 840 m/s and a Canon de 90 mm SA mle. 1945 gun with a velocity of 1000 m/s. At the same date two hundred ACL 1 turrets were ordered.

As France had been rather isolated from engineering developments in the rest of the world, the designers based themselves on types they already knew well, mainly the Char B1, the Char G1 and the FCM F1 — contrary to what some sources state the ARL 44 was not directly derived from the earlier ARL 40 project. An attempt was made to use the components developed between 1940 and 1944, though most soon proved to be incompatible. As a result of the reliance on older types, the ARL 44 was to be fitted with a very old-fashioned suspension system with small road wheels, using the same track as the Char B1, limiting maximum speed to about 30 km/h. The suggestion to use a more modern foreign suspension system was rejected as it would have compromised the tank's status as a purely French design. A Talbot 450 hp or Panhard 400 hp engine was envisaged. Progress was very slow as there was a lack of resources and much infrastructure in the Paris region had been destroyed. Even finding paper and drawing materials was difficult.

In February 1945 a meeting took place between the engineers and the Army. The tank officers quickly pointed out that building a tank according to the original specifications was pointless as such a vehicle would be inferior to even an M4 Sherman, a type that could be obtained for free from the Allies in any numbers so desired. It was therefore decided that the ARL 44 would be fitted with 120 mm of sloped armour, bringing the weight, which even in the conceptual stage had already grown to 43 metric tons, to 48 tons. The armament should consist of the most powerful gun available; this would probably be the American 76 mm or with some luck the British 17-pounder; 90 mm guns had not been made available by the Allies.

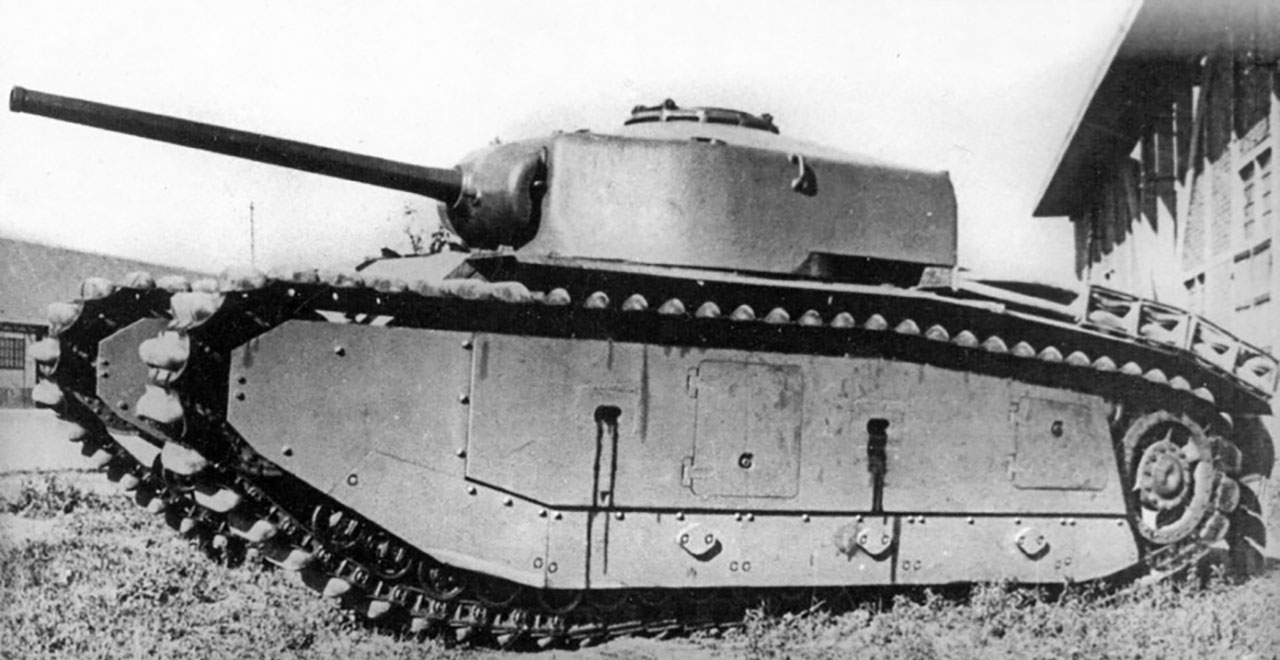
First prototype

Only a wooden mock-up had been completed by an engineering team headed by Engineer General Maurice Lavirotte, when the war ended. However, the end of hostilities did not mean the end of the entire project. To maintain some continuation in French tank design and bolster national morale, on 23 May 1945 it was decided to build 150 vehicles, even though there was no longer any real tactical need for them. On 23 June this was reduced to sixty vehicles, two to be finished in the first half of 1946. In March 1946 the first prototype was tested, still with 60 mm armour. The Atelier et Chantiers de la Loire built the ACL1 turret used for the prototype, fitted with the American 76 mm gun; this was later replaced by a Schneider turret based on the one designed for the Char F1 and fitted with the 90 mm DCA naval AA-gun which had a muzzle velocity of 1000 m/s (AP; 1130 m/s HE) and a muzzle brake — thus the ARL 44 was the first French tank to feature this item. Firing trials began on 27 June 1947; the gun often proved to be more accurate than that of a Panther used for comparison.

Mainly due to the change in armament, the development and production of the turret would be drawn out; it was not until 1949 that turrets could be fitted to hulls produced in 1946 and placed into storage. Forty hulls had been completed by FAMH and a further twenty by Renault. They were fitted with captured German Maybach HL230 600 hp engines (real output 575 hp), brought back by a mission headed by General Joseph Molinié in the summer of 1945, repeating the course of events with the Char 2C, which after the previous war had also received captured Maybach engines.

== Description ==
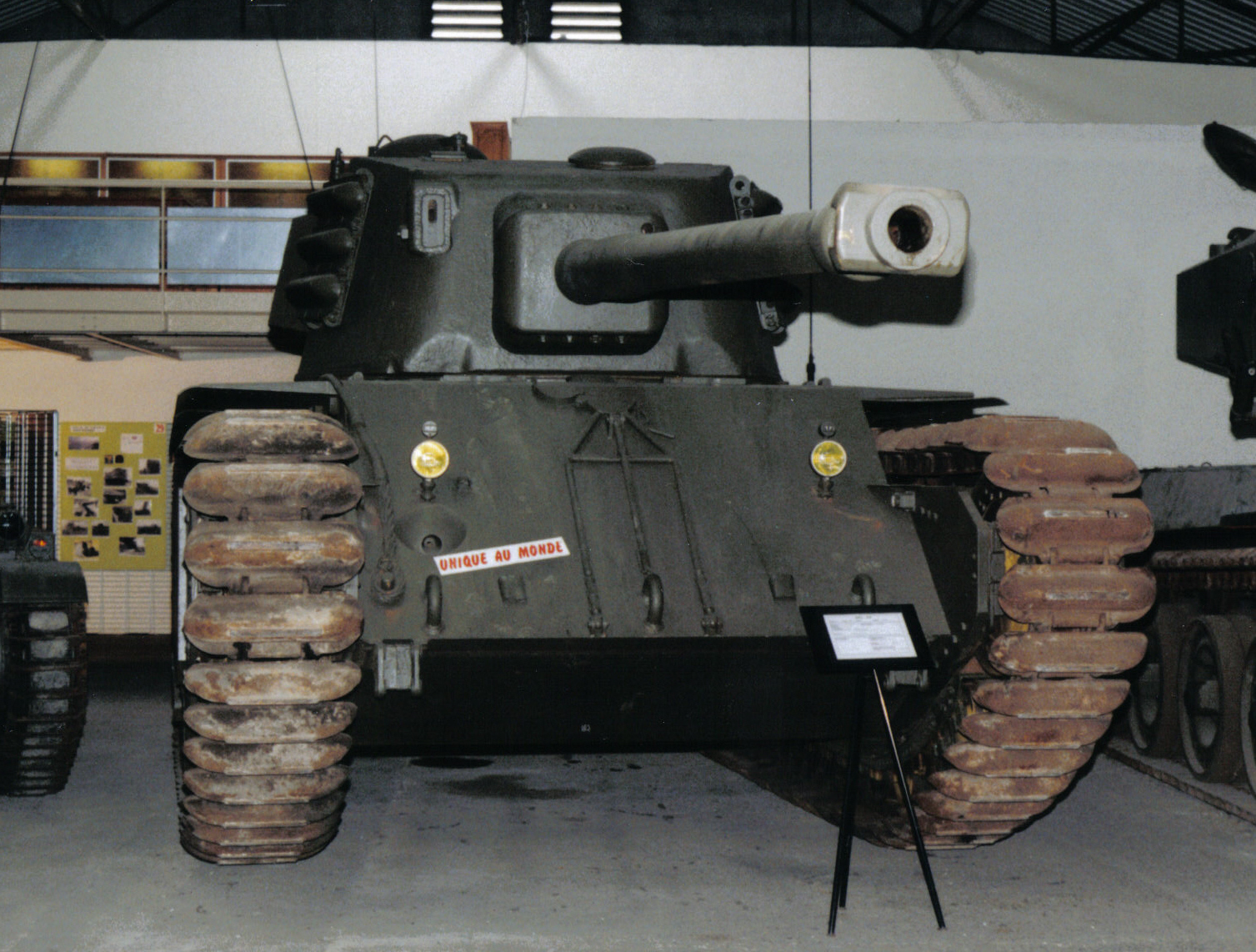
Frontal view

The ARL 44 clearly shows that it is based on earlier French heavy tank design. The hull is long, 722 centimetres, but relatively narrow, just as a vehicle meant to cross wide trenches would be. The covered suspension, with its many small road wheels, that had already been outdated in the 1930s, is the most obvious sign of its basic Char B1 ancestry; it is in essence identical to that of the Char B1 ter. It had been considered to use a more modern pneumatic suspension, but when the armour was increased a choice was made for a traditional configuration with steel coil springs and hydraulic shock-breakers, as the rubber seals of the pneumatic elements could not withstand the higher pressures. The type has often been compared to the many "Super Char B" projects from before the war. Its speed is likewise limited, the lowest of any fifty ton tank built after the war. This was also partly due to the lack of a sufficiently powerful engine; it had originally been intended to compensate for this by using a more efficient petro-electrical transmission. This kind of transmission has as a major drawback that it very easily overheats and the ARL 44 as a result was fitted with an impressive and complex array of ventilators and cooling ducts; the engine deck was made to extend behind the track to accommodate them all. Fuel reservoirs holding 1370 litres gave a range of 350 to 400 kilometres.

The hull glacis plate is 120 mm thick and reclined at about 45°, giving a line-of-sight thickness in the horizontal plane of about 170 mm. This made the ARL 44 the most heavily armoured French tank until the Leclerc. Within the glacis, low on the right side, a 7.5 mm modèle 1931 machine-gun is fitted in a fixed position.

The turret was the most modern looking part; it was also an obvious makeshift solution, somewhat crudely welded together from plates taken from the wreck of the battlecruiser Dunkerque scuttled in 1942, made necessary by the simple fact that Schneider as yet could not produce complete cast turrets large enough to hold a 90 mm gun. The turret front, however, was a cast section. As the turret was positioned near the middle of the tank, even when pointing to the back the gun would have a large overhang; to facilitate transport it was therefore made retractable into the turret, its breech even exiting through a rectangular opening in the rear of the bustle, covered by a bolted-on plate. This could also be used to load ammunition. The turret was rotated by a Simca 5 engine. Three men out of a crew of five were seated in the turret. It also held a SCR 508 radio set. This differed from the configuration in the Char B1 bis where the radio had been placed at the inner left hull side. With the ARL 44, the space gained was used for a door which was the normal way for the crew to enter the tank. Additionally there were a rectangular hatch at the left turret top, and a circular hatch at the right with between them a very low cupola for the commander.

In all, the ARL 44 was an unsatisfactory interim design as the "Transitional Tank", the main function of which was to provide experience in building heavier vehicles. The main lesson learned for many engineers was that it was unwise to construct too-heavy types, and this opinion was reinforced by the failure of the tank project to which the ARL 44 formed the transition: the much more ambitious heavy AMX 50. Only after a gap of sixteen years would France, in 1966, again build a main battle tank, the AMX 30.

== Operational history ==
On 26 October 1950 the type was reclassified as a tank destroyer, the Chasseur de Chars de 48 tonnes. The ARL 44s equipped the 503e Régiment de Chars de Combat stationed in Mourmelon-le-Grand and before the end of 1950 replaced seventeen Panther tanks used earlier by that unit. In service the ARL 44 was at first an unreliable vehicle: the brakes, the gear box, and the suspension were too frail, resulting in several serious accidents. A special improvement programme remedied most of these shortcomings. The ARL 44 made only one public appearance, ten vehicles participating in the Bastille Day parade on 14 July 1951. When the American M47 Patton became available, a type that also had a 90 mm gun, they were phased out in 1953. In November 1953 it was proposed to either scrap them or use them in static positions to reinforce the border fortifications. On 20 December 1954, it was decided to scrap them. Some were used as targets. The rumour that most ARL 44s were exported to Argentina is unfounded.

== Surviving vehicles ==
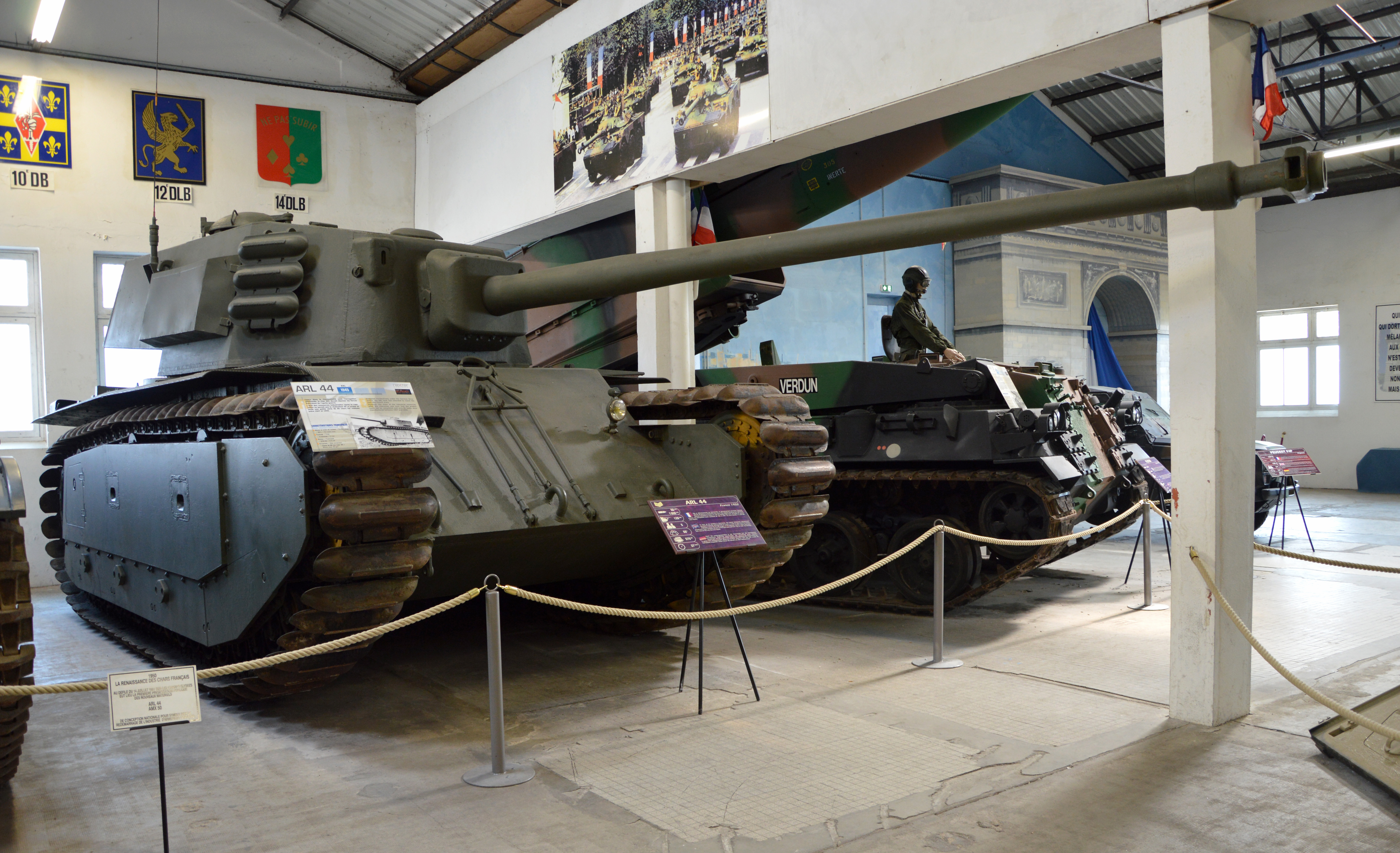
ARL 44 at the Musée des Blindés

Three surviving ARL 44s were counted in 2008. An ARL 44 can be seen in the Musée des Blindés in Saumur; another one is a monument at the 501st-503rd Tank Regiment, Mourmelon-le-Grand, and a third is a wreck on the technical zone of the base of the 2nd Dragoon Regiment at Fontevraud. It is relatively complete but the gun is dismounted from the turret. Later an additional two were located; they were in 2017 awaiting restoration by the ASPHM Association, at La Wantzenau.

== See also ==
- British Black Prince heavy tank - late-war prototype heavy tank
- British Caernarvon Mark I heavy tank - post-war stopgap prototype heavy tank
- United States M26 Pershing - late war heavy tank armed with a 90mm gun
- United States T29 heavy tank - post-war prototype heavy tank
- Soviet IS-2 model 1944 heavy assault tank - late-war heavy tank, entered service in 1944
- German Tiger II heavy tank - late-war tank that inspired the ARL 44's design
- French AMX 50 heavy tank - similar post-war heavy tank project
