= 503e Régiment de chars de combat =

Armored tank unit of the French Army

503^{e} Régiment de chars de combat
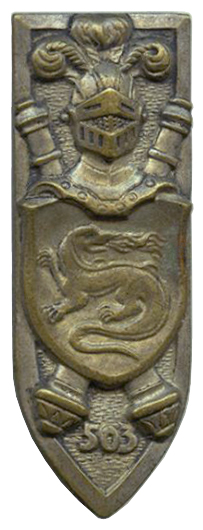
- Regimental Insignia of the 503^{e} RCC
- Active: 1918 – 2009
- Country: France
- Branch: French Army
- Mottos: « Feux et foi »(Fr) « Du chic et du cran »(Fr)
- Engagements: World War I World War II
- Battle honours: Soissonnais 1918; Montdidier 1918; Bataille de l'Aisne (1918); La Lys 1918

The 503^{e} régiment de chars de combat 503^{e} RCC in French, (503^{e} R.C.C, or 503rd Combat Tank Regiment) was an armoured tank unit of the French Army created on June 4, 1918 and which took part in the two world wars. The regiment merged with the 501^{e} Régiment de chars de combat 501^{e} RCC to form the 501^{e}-503^{e} Régiment de chars de combat 501^{e}-503^{e} RCC, a unit equipped with 80 Leclerc tanks. The regiment was dissolved on June 23, 2009.

== Creation and different nominations ==
- 1916 : creation of the assault artillery.
- 1918 : creation on June 4 of the 503rd Special Artillery Regiment (French: 503^{e} Régiment d'artillerie spéciale, 503^{e} RAS).
- 1920 : became the 503^{e} régiment de chars de combat 503^{e} RCC.
- 1939 : the regiment became the 503rd Tank Battalion Group (French: 503^{e} Groupe de bataillons de chars, 503^{e} GBC).
- 1940 : dissolution of the regiment.
- 1951 : recreation of the 503^{e} RCC.
- 1994 : merged with the 501^{e} RCC1, the regiment became the 503rd squadron group of the 501^{e}-503^{e} RCC.
- 2009 : dissolution, on June 23, 2009, of the 503^{e} GE, the regiment was redesignated as the 501^{e} RCC.

== History ==
=== World War I ===
The 503rd Special Artillery Regiment issued from the assault artillery was created in 1916. Enacted on June 4, 1918 by the merger of three Light Tank Battalions each formed of three artillery groups.

The regiment was engaged in the battle of the Marne to cover the pocket of Château-Thierry. In three days of combat in the Soissonnais, the battalions contributed 40 hours of march out of which 30 in combat. The regiment was accordingly sent to Picardie and was successful at Montdidier. In August 1918, making way back to Soissons, the regiment participated within the cadre and corps of the 10^{e} Armée to the counter-attack of Mangin. While clearing Soissons, the three battalions adopted Vauxaillon as a marching axe and pushed back towards Chemin des Dames. From October to November 1918, the regiment was seen ending campaign in la Lys in Belgium.

=== World War II ===
During dissolution on August 25, 1939, the 503^{e} RCC were formed from four combat tank battalions which were distributed between several tank groups:

- GBC 503
  - 3rd combat tank battalion (45 R35 tanks)
  - 7th combat tank battalion (45 FCM 36 tanks)
- GBC 513
  - combat tank battalion (63 FT 17 tanks)
- GBC 518
- combat tank battalion (63 FT 17 tanks)

The newly redesignated GBC 503 was formed from the three light combat tank battalions, all of which were assigned to the 2^{e} Armée:

- 3^{e} BCC (45 R35 tanks)
- 4^{e} BCC (45 FCM 36 tanks)
- 7^{e} BCC (45 FCM 36 tanks)
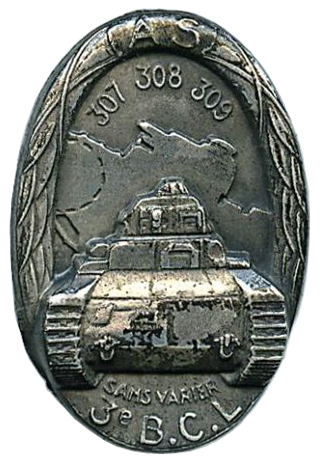
3^{e} BCC

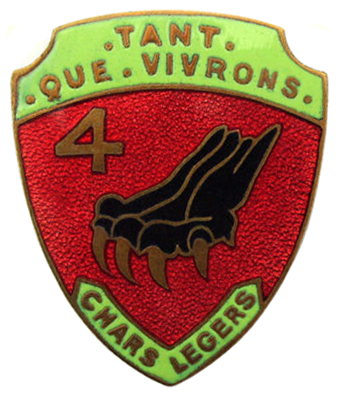
4^{e} BCC

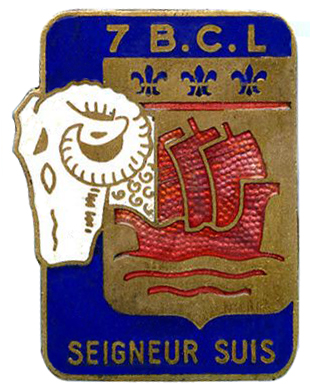
7^{e} BCC

On May 10, 1940, two battalions of GBC 503, each equipped with 45 FCM 36s, were deployed near the verrou de Stonne and in Argonne. The 4^{e} BCL and 7^{e} BCL battled to relieve the encircled French infantry. Both battalions disappeared. On the 9 and 10, the 4^{e} BCC combat engaged on Aisn, Voncq, in front of Vouziers and South of Ardennes.

=== 1945 to 2009 ===
On April 1, 1951, the 503^{e} RCC was recreated at Mourmelon. The regiment was equipped with new ARL 44 tanks and heavy Panther tanks.

In 1952, the regiment received M47 Patton tanks.

During the Algerian War, from 1956 to 1963, the regiment was transformed into a training centre prior their departure to Algeria.

In 1963, the training centre was redesignated as a combat tank regiment and following experimentation, the 503^{e} RCC was the first regiment to receive the AMX-30 B while specializing in the piercing of obstacles in submersion.

In 1982, the 503^{e} RCC had yet again the privilege to be equipped with the first AMX 30 B2.

In 1990, the chef d'état major de l'armée de terre CEMAT, created a combat tank regiment with 80 Leclerc tanks - designated RC 80 - constituted of two squadron groups (GE) formed respectively by the 4^{e} Régiment de dragons 4^{e} RD and the 503^{e} RCC. On August 31, 1994, while the 501^{e} RCC was dissolved, the squadron group of the 4^{e} Régiment de dragons was designated as squadron group 501 and formed, with the GE 503, the 501^{e}-503^{e} Régiment de chars de combat.

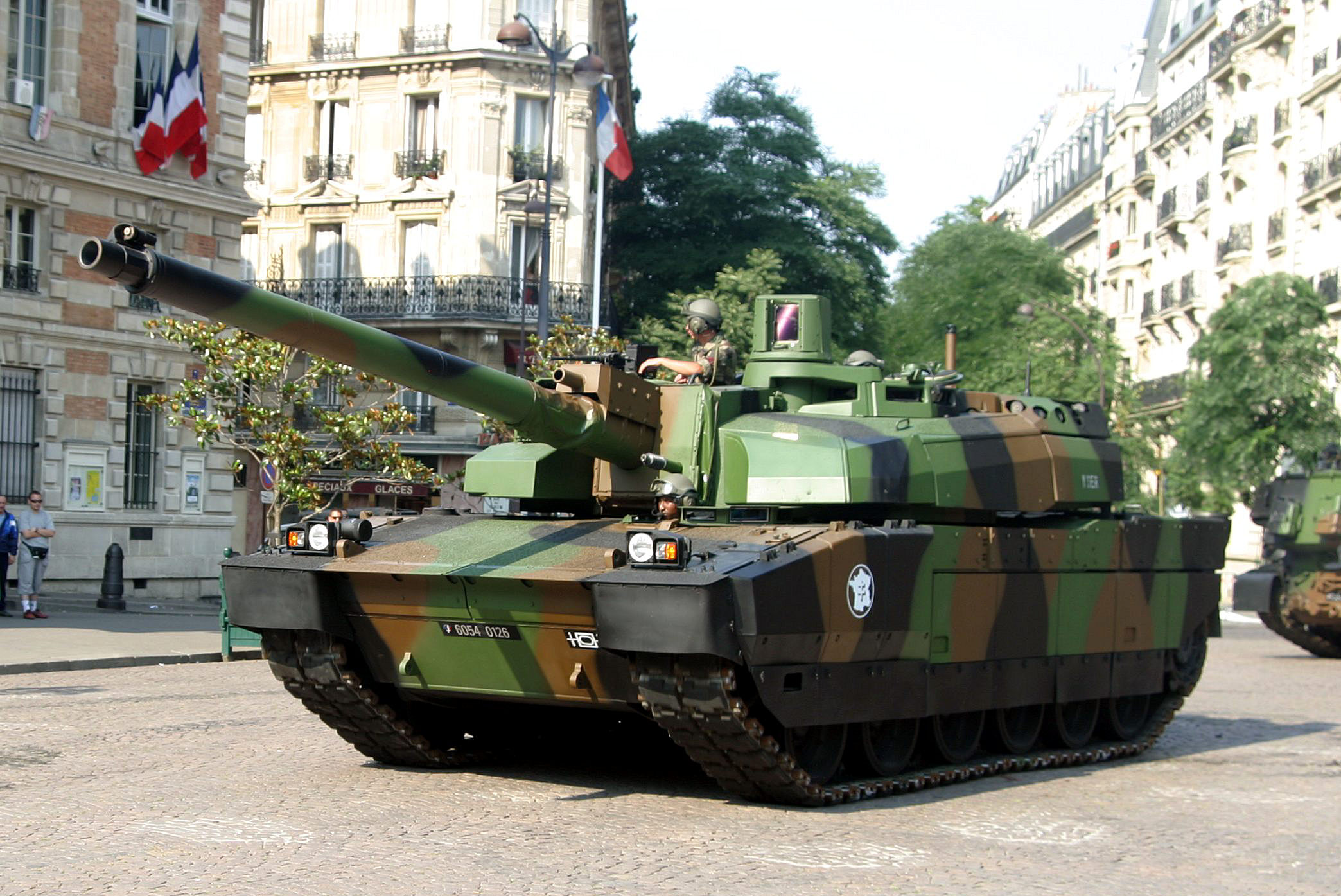
AMX Leclerc Tank

Diamond arm insignia of the 503^{e} RCC

The dissolution of squadron group 503 intervened on June 23, 2009. The 239 military personnel which belonged to the GE 503 reinforced the new unit which was redesignated as the 501^{e} RCC. The 4th combat squadron of the 501^{e} RCC, which was projected in a deployment to New Caledonia in 2009, then to Lebanon the following year, was created from the 1st squadron of the 503^{e} RCC.

The men of the new regiment bear wearing the same beret, the insignia and Fourragere of the 501^{e} RCC, nevertheless conserve the traditions of the 503^{e} RCC.

The regimental colors of the 503^{e} RCC was handed over to the last commandant of the 501^{e}-503^{e} RCC

==== Missions ====
Similarly to the regiment, the squadron group GE 503 has participated to numerous combats engagements. Engagements included relieving missions in ex-Yugoslavia, and Kosovo and on all exterior theatres of intervention (Tchad, Lebanon, Kuwait, Central African Republic, as well as Senegal, the Ivory Coast and Afghanistan).

==== Organization ====
The GE 503 included 40 Leclerc tanks and was supported by two squadrons in general means and maintenance, shared with the GE 501.

== Traditions ==
=== Regimental Colors ===
The regimental colors of the 503^{e} Régiment de chars de combat

=== Decorations ===
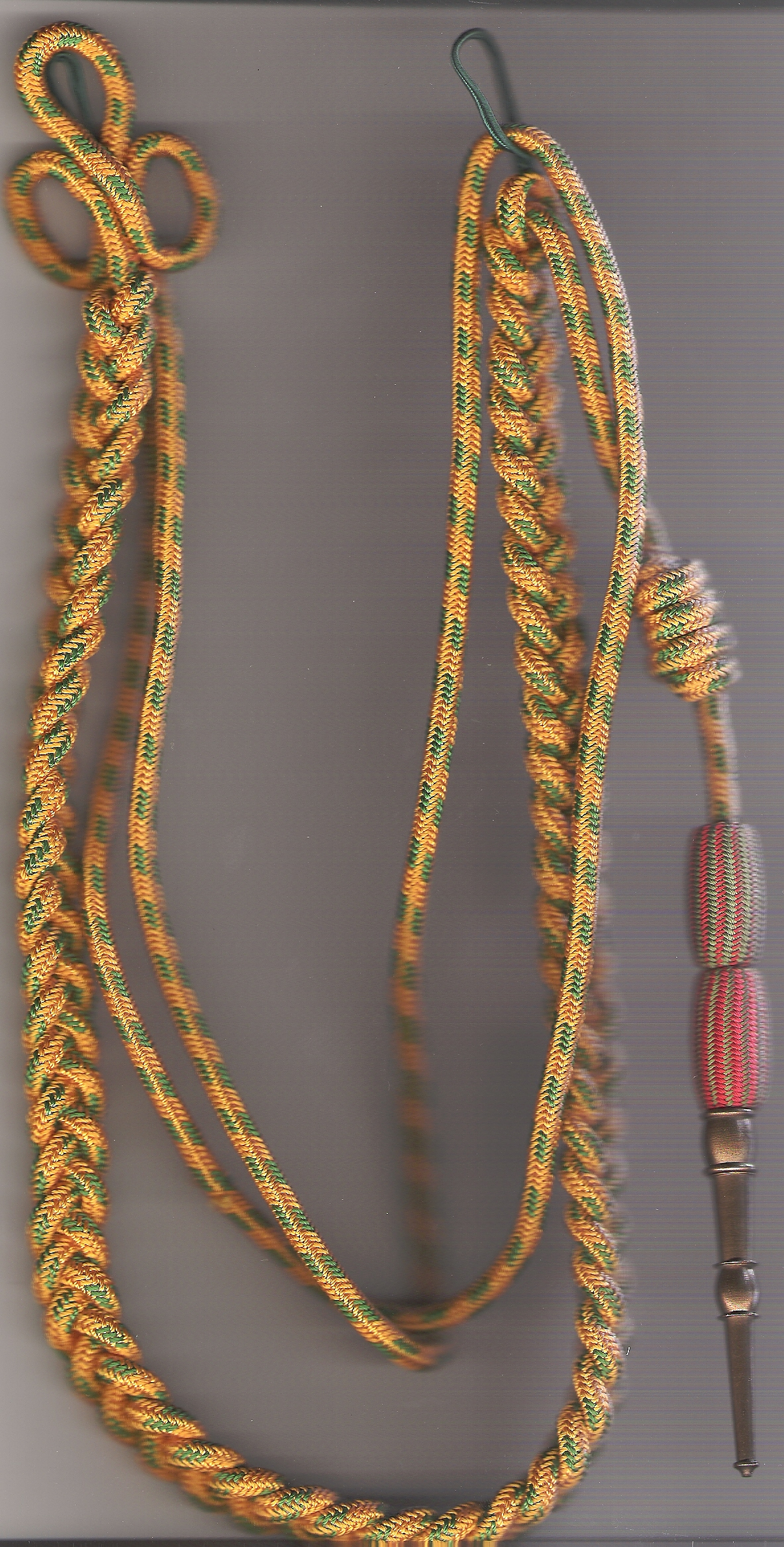
Fourragère, dite « fantaisie », with colors of the médaille miliaire and olives of the croix de guerre 1914-1918 & 1939-1945.

Contrary to the rules, a ministerial decision in 1951 authorized the regiment to bear wearing the regimental colors, the palms acquired by the regiments battalions (5 palms by the 3rd battalion and 3 palms by the 7th battalion), as well as 3 Fourragere. Croix de Guerre 1914-18 with 8 palms and 3 stars.

The Fourragere with colors of the Médaille militaire, bearing colors of the Croix de guerre 1914-1918 and colors of the Croix de guerre 1939-1945.

In 1939, six companies were entitled to wear the fourragere with colors of the Croix de Guerre 1914-18 and the Médaille militaire. In total, 24 palms were awarded to six companies. Three of these companies integrated the 503^{e} RCC in 1935. In 1918, these companies were combined to form the 501^{e} RCC which authorizes that regiment to wear the fourragere with colors of the Médaille militaire.

=== Battle Honours ===
- Soissonnais 1918
- Montdidier 1918
- Vauxaillon 1918
- La Lys 1918

== Regimental Commanders ==
=== Regimental Commander of the 503^{e} RCC (1918 - 1940) ===
- 1918 - 1919 : chef de bataillon Michel
- 1919 - 1919 : lieutenant-colonel Sabourdin
- 1919 - 1922 : lieutenant-colonel Mahot
- 1922 - 1926 : colonel de la Coulerie
- 1926 - 1928 : colonel Herscher
- 1928 - 1930 : colonel Sauvage
- 1930 - 1932 : colonel Martin
- 1932 - 1934 : colonel Herlaut
- 1934 - 1936 : colonel Stehle
- 1936 - 1938 : colonel Boiron

=== Regimental Commander of the 503^{e} RCC (1950 -1990) ===
- 1950 - 1951 : chef d'escadrons Marchal
- 1951 - 1954 : lieutenant-colonel Marchal
- 1954 - 1956 : lieutenant-colonel Potin
- 1956 - 1957 : lieutenant-colonel Derringer
- 1957 - 1958 : lieutenant-colonel Bezard
- 1958 - 1959 : lieutenant-colonel de Montardy
- 1959 - 1961 : lieutenant-colonel Potin
- 1961 - 1964 : lieutenant-colonel Quenot
- 1964 - 1966 : lieutenant-colonel Rouge
- 1966 - 1968 : lieutenant-colonel Huberdeau
- 1968 - 1970 : lieutenant-colonel Schlagdenhauffen
- 1970 - 1972 : lieutenant-colonel Boidot
- 1972 - 1974 : lieutenant-colonel Péret
- 1974 - 1976 : lieutenant-colonel then Col. Dinechin
- 1976 - 1978 : lieutenant-colonel Caralp
- 1978 - 1980 : lieutenant-colonel Lafont
- 1980 - 1982 : lieutenant-colonel then Col. Vaujour
- 1982 - 1984 : lieutenant-colonel then Col. Gouraud
- 1984 - 1986 : colonel Forterre
- 1986 - 1988 : colonel Maillard
- 1988 - 1990 : colonel Avenel

=== Regimental commander of the 503 GE (1990- 2009) ===
- 1990 - 1992 : lieutenant-colonel Humeau
- 1992 - 1994 : lieutenant-colonel Tricoche
- 1994 - 1996 : lieutenant-colonel Moreau
- 1996 - 1998 : lieutenant-colonel Billières
- 1998 - 2000 : lieutenant-colonel Gouraud
- 2000 - 2002 : lieutenant-colonel Fuchs
- 2002 - 2004 : lieutenant-colonel Hanus
- 2004 - 2006 : lieutenant-colonel Vaglio
- 2006 - 2008 : lieutenant-colonel Bottet
- 2008 - 2009 : lieutenant-colonel de Beauregard

== See also ==
- 31st Brigade
