= 501e Régiment de chars de combat =

501st Combat Tank Regiment
- 501^{e} Régiment de chars de combat
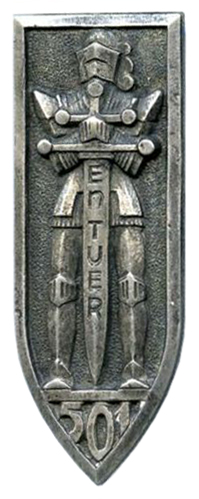
- Regimental Insignia of the 501^{e} RCC
- Active: 1918 – present
- Country: France
- Branch: French Army
- Part of: 2nd Armoured Brigade; 3rd Division
- Engagements: World War I Russian Civil War: Allied intervention in the Russian Civil War; World War II; First Indochina War; Lebanese Civil War: Multinational Force in Lebanon; War on terror (2001–present)
- Battle honours: Aisne (1918); Soissonnais (1918); Champagne (1918); Belgique (1918); El-Alamein (1942); Paris (1944); Strasbourg (1944)

Commanders
- Notable commanders: Philippe Leclerc de Hauteclocque

The 501^{e} Régiment de chars de combat 501^{e} RCC in French, (501^{e} R.C.C, or 501st Combat Tank Regiment) is an armoured tank unit of the French Army created on 13 May 1918, and which took part in World War I, World War II the Russian Civil War, the First Indochina War, the Algerian war, Lebanese Civil War and the war on terror.

The regiment participated to the campaigns of Free France, then the liberation of Europe at the corps of the 2nd Armoured Division 2^{e} DB of général Philippe François Marie Leclerc de Hauteclocque.

Merged with the 503^{e} Régiment de chars de combat 503^{e} RCC to form the 501^{e}-503^{e} Régiment de chars de combat 501^{e}-503^{e} RCC, the regiment was redesignated as 501^{e} RCC on 23 June 2009.

== Creation and different nominations ==
- 1916 : creation of the assault artillery.
- 1918 : creation of the 501st Special Artillery Regiment (French: 501^{e} Régiment d'artillerie spéciale, 501^{e} RAS).
- 1920 : became the 501^{e} régiment de chars de combat 501^{e} RCC.
- 1939 : the regiment became the 501st Tank Battalion Group (French: 501^{e} Groupe de bataillons de chars, 501^{e} GBC).
- 1940 : dissolution of GBC
- 1940 : 1st Tank company of Free France.
- 1943 : creation of the 501^{e} RCC.
- 1994 : merged with the 503^{e} RCC, was designated as 501^{e}-503^{e} RCC.
- 2009 : dissolution of GE 503, regiment redesignated as 501^{e} RCC.

== History ==
=== World War I ===
On 16 April 1917, 132 Schneider CA1 mounted an assault on Berry-au-Bac. Considered the first mounted tank assault in times. From this tank groupment, the 501st Assault Artillery Regiment (French: 501^{e} Régiment d'artillerie d'assaut, 501^{e} RAS.) was created on 20 May 1918.

the 501^{e} RAS, designated RCC, would be the first unit formed with the new organization of the armoured troops in the beginning of 1918.

Initially composed of the first Groupment of Schneider tanks and of the 1st and 2nd battalions of light tanks, (the 1^{er} and 2^{e} BCL), created respectively on 19 February and 18 March 1918 and equipped with Renault FT. the 3rd battalion, formed on 27 March, was initially assigned to the 508^{e} Régiment de chars de combat 508^{e} RCC then transferred to the 501^{e} RCC since 29 May 1918.

Each light tank battalion was composed of three companies numbered from the 301.

=== Interwar period ===
The 501^{e} was engaged in outre-mer at the corps of the army of the Orient. The 303rd Company of the 501st supported French and Greek forces around Odesa and Kherson, where they fought Nikifor Hryhorev's partisans. On 13 May 1920 the 501 was designated as the 501e Régiment de chars de combat.

=== World War II ===
With the outbreak of the World War II, the regiment formed four combat tank battalions: the 1^{e} and 2^{e} BCC were respectively issued from the 1st and 2nd battalions of the 501^{e} RCC and each comprised 45 Renault R35 tanks while the 30^{e} and 31^{e} BCC were respectively formed and equipped of 63 FT tanks from the reserves. While the 1^{e}, 2^{e} and 31^{e} BCC remained at the corps of GBC 501 and were assigned to the Vth Army, the 30^{e} BCC joined the GBC 502 of the IIIrd Army. These companies were engaged individually.

With the 342^{e} autonomous company back from Narvik out of which a dozen of volunteers joined the Free France, the 1st autonomous tank company of Free France was formed.

The company later served within the ranks of the VIIIth British Army, equipped with British combat Crusader tank. This company was part of the "colonne volante" with the 1st Spahi Regiment.

Two other companies created in 1940 and 1941 merged then with the later to constitute a regiment (the regiment was articulated accordingly into four combat companies).

After having joined the United Kingdom with the 2nd Armoured Division 2^{e} DB, in April 1944, the 501^{e} embarked on August 3 to the Bancs de Grande Vey, on the north-east coast of Carentan. The regiment partook in the liberation of Paris, the tank battle of Dompaire, then Strasbourg and finished the events of campaign series engagements on 5 May 1945. The American command awarded the regiment, the « U.S. Presidential Unit Citation ».

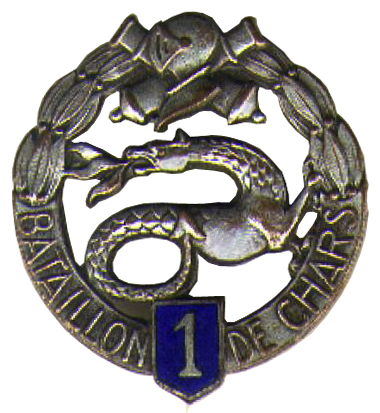
1^{er} BCC

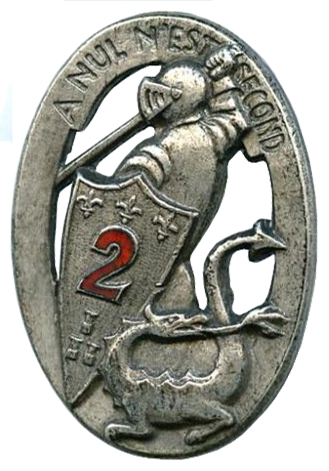
2^{e} BCC

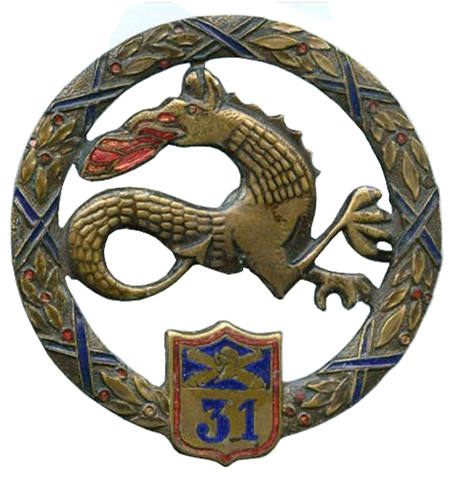
31^{e} BCC
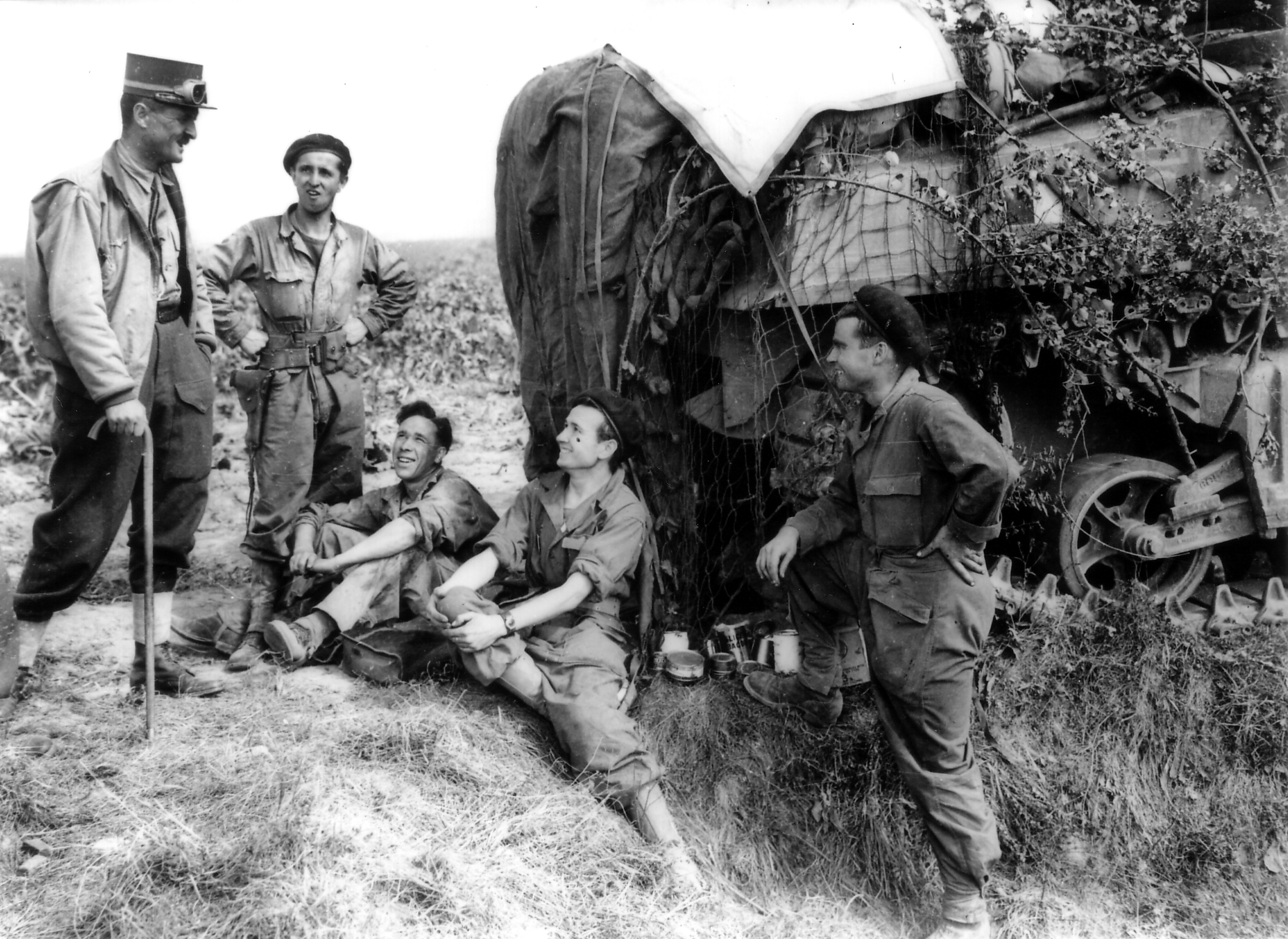
Général Leclerc holding talks with soldiers of the 501^{e} RCC.

=== 1945 to present ===
Formed on 1 September 1945, a marching company embarked for Indochina.

The regiment was engaged in Central Europe, Senegal (1982), Lebanon (1984), Central African Republic (since 1985) and Yugoslavia.

On 1 September 1990 the chef d'état major de l'armée de terre CEMAT, created from the 4^{e} Régiment de dragons 4^{e} RD and the 503^{e} Régiment de chars de combat, a regiment composed of 80 Leclerc tanks in two squadron groups (GE).

On 31 August 1994 the 501^{e} Régiment de chars de combat was dissolved. Simultaneously, the squadron group of the 4^{e} RD was designated squadron group 501. This evolution was remarked in the order of battle of the French Army, the 501^{e}-503^{e} Régiment de chars de combat.

On 23 June 2009 the 503 GE was dissolved and formed a fourth combat squadron as part of the regiment, which became the 501^{e} RCC. Accordingly, the regiment became part of the 2nd Armoured Brigade.

== Traditions ==
=== Insignia ===
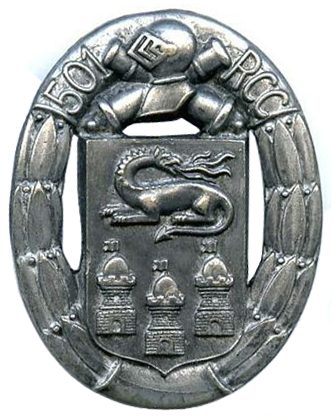
Insignia type 1.

=== Regimental Colors ===
Regimental Colors of the 501^{e} Régiment de chars de combat, 501^{e} RCC.

=== Regimental Song ===
Dans le vent, la pluie et l'orage
Chevaux de fer monstres d'aciers canons pointés
Meilleur des chars toujours avec courage
Marche au combat sous les rafales avec fierté

Au 501 soyons toujours fidèles
De la DB les cœurs plus valeureux
Faisant flotter cette devise belle
Nous resterons toujours fiers et heureux

Prends garde aussi devant sa lunette
Un jour tu passe il restera trois secondes
Pour qu'a jamais ta propre vie s'arrête
Le béret noir t'envoie dans l'autre monde

L'éternité te sera moins pénible
Tu te diras ce n'est pas le hasard
C'est sans retour si l'on devient la cible
Du 501 toujours premier des chars

Au baroud après la bagarre
Si tu reviens avant de partir au pays
Tête levée pense à ton étendard
Car son serment d'Afrique n'a plus jamais trahi

Pense à celui qui reste sur la piste
Dans la fournaise le cœur dans sa tourelle
S'en est allé la haut vers les tankistes
Pour que la vie soit ici moins cruelle

=== Decorations ===
The regimental colors of the 501^{e} RCC are decorated with:

- Croix de guerre 1914–1918 with :
  - 2 palms titled to the 1st Light Tank Battalion of the 501st Special Artillery Regiment
- Croix de guerre 1939–1945 with:
  - 2 palms
- Croix de la Libération.

Fourragere:

- The regiment is entitled to bear wearing the fourragere with colors of the Croix de guerre 1914–1918 with olive colors of the Croix de guerre 1939–1945 and colors of the Croix de la Libération.
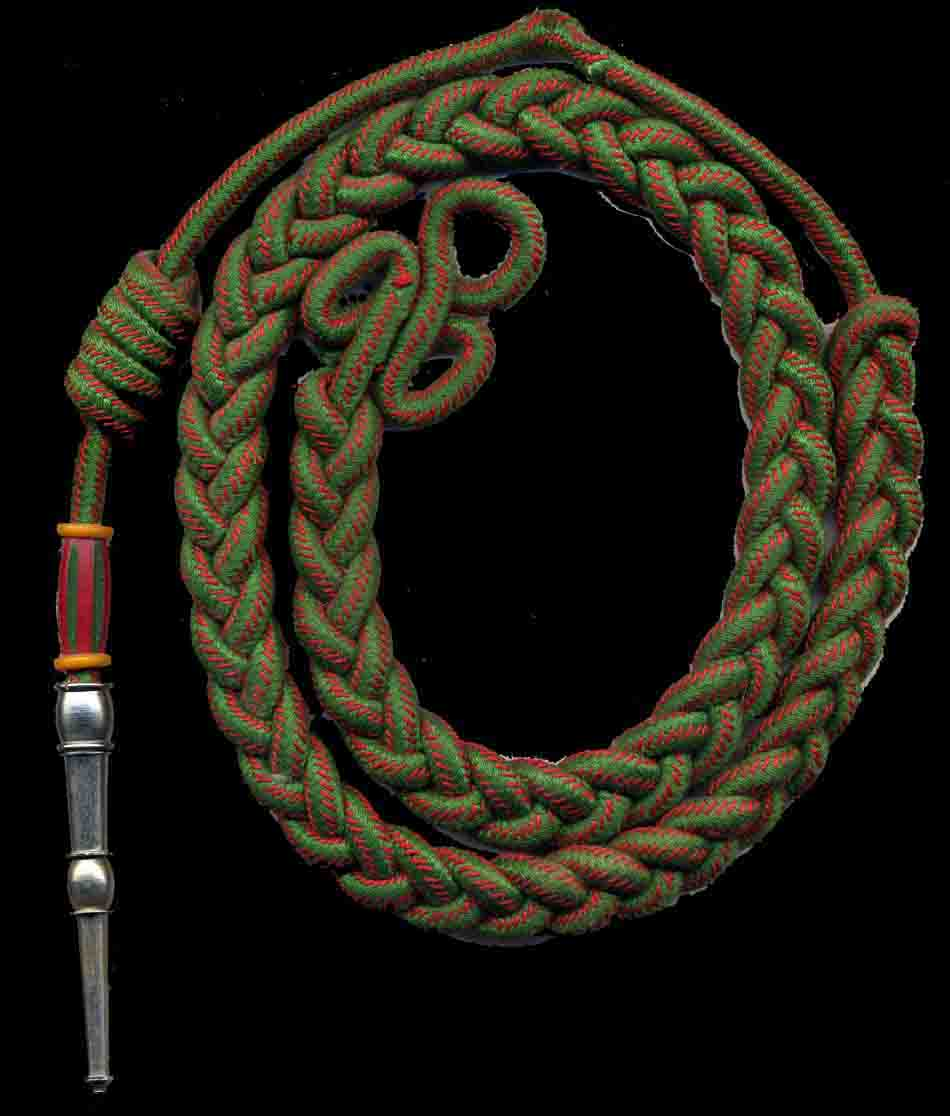
Fourragere with colors of the Croix de guerre 1914–1918 and olive colors of the Croix de guerre 1939–1945.

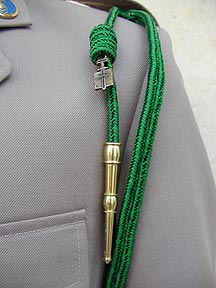
Fourragere with colors of the Ordre de la Libération.

In 1939, six companies were entitled to wear the fourragere with colors of the Croix de Guerre 1914–1918. In total, 15 palms were awarded to six companies. Three companies of the 3rd battalion of the 501^{e} RCC were awarded the fourragere cited at the orders of the Médaille militaire for four citations at the orders of the armed forces.

=== Battle Honours ===
- Aisne (1918)
- Soissonnais (1918)
- Champagne (1918)
- Belgique (1918)
- El-Alamein (1942)
- Paris (1944)
- Strasbourg (1944)

== Regimental Commanders ==
(1918–1976)

- 1918 : chef d'escadrons then lieutenant-colonel Velpry
- 1939 : colonel Salvagnac
- 1958 : lieutenant-colonel de Torquat
- 1961 : Lalo
- 1963 : Fournier
- 1965 : Y. Michaut
- 1968 : Philiponnat
- 1970 : Lewin
- 1972 : de la Rochette de Rochegonde
- 1974 : Courtois
- 1976 : Espieux
- 1978 : Arnold
- 1980 : Bouche
- 1982 : Genest
- 1984 : Guinard
- 1986 : Roux
- 1988 : de Fontaine
- 1990 : Aumonier
- 1992 : colonel Cuche

GE 501 (1976–1994)

- 1994 : Vauvillier
- 1996 : Proust
- 1998 : de Castelbajac
- 2000 : Maguin
- 2002 : Temporel
- 2004 : Pesqueur
- 2006 : Bossion
- 2008 : Gelfi

501^{e} RCC (1994–present)

- 2009 : Nimser
- 2010 : Reichert
- 2012 : Charpy
- 2014 : Mary
- 2016 : Dufilhol
- 2018 : Colombani
- 2020 : Oldra
- 2022 : Leroy
- 2024 : Clement

== See also ==
- 31st Brigade
