= Engin Principal du Génie =

French armored engineering vehicle

The Engin Principal du Génie is an armoured engineering vehicle built upon the chassis of the Leclerc battle tank.

It succeeds the Engin Blindé du Génie.
