= 501e-503e Régiment de chars de combat =

501st–503rd Combat Tank Regiment
- 501^{e}-503^{e} Régiment de chars de combat
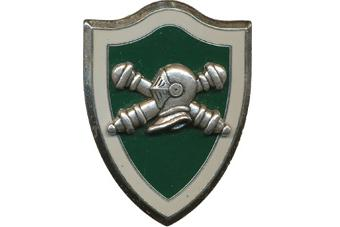
- Regimental Insignia of the 501^{e}-503^{e} RCC
- Active: 31 August 1994 – 23 June 2009
- Country: France
- Branch: French Army
- Type: Régiment de chars de combat Combat Tank Regiment
- Role: Arme blindée cavalerie Armoured Armed Cavalry
- Part of: 1st Mechanized Brigade
- Equipment: Leclerc

The 501^{e}-503^{e} Régiment de chars de combat (RCC; '501st–503rd Combat Tank Regiment') was an armoured tank unit of the French Army. The regiment was the armoured component of the 1st Mechanised Brigade. The regiment was equipped with 80 tanks. The 503^{e} RCC was dissolved in 2009.

== History ==
The 501^{e} Régiment de chars de combat (501^{e} RCC) was merged with the 503e Régiment de chars de combat (503^{e} RCC) in 1994 to form the 501st/503rd RCC armed with 80 Leclerc tanks.

The regiment has participated in numerous combat engagements: the relief missions in Kosovo and the former Yugoslavia, and was found on all exterior theatres of intervention (Chad, Lebanon, Kuwait, Central African Republic, as well as Senegal, the Ivory Coast and Afghanistan).

The regiment was divided into two groups of 40 Leclerc tanks, each supported by two squadrons: one of general means and the other of maintenance.

Each group of squadron can be projected in exterior theatres of operations.

The 501^{e}-503^{e} RCC in a complete count was constituted of 80 tanks, 500 armor and diverse vehicles articulated by 1300 men.

The 503^{e} RCC was dissolved on June 23, 2009.

The 501^{e} RCC remained part of the 1st Mechanized Brigade 1^{re} BM until August 1, 2009 and accordingly integrated the 2nd Armoured Brigade 2^{e} BB.

The 239 military personnel of the 503^{e} reinforced the squadrons of the 501^{e}.

== Organization ==
The regiment had 1300 officers and soldiers and consisted of 12 squadrons:

- EAS - Administration and Support Squadron
- 1^{er} Groupe d’Escadron (1^{er} GE) - 1st Squadron Group (x40 MBTs)
  - ECL - Command and Logistics Squadron
  - 1^{er} Esc - 1st Squadron
  - 2^{e} Esc - 2nd Squadron
  - 3^{e} Esc - 3rd Squadron
- 2^{e} Groupe d’Escadron (2^{e} GE) 2nd Squadron Group (x40 MBTs)
  - ECL - Command and Logistics Squadron
  - 1^{er} Esc - 1st Squadron
  - 2^{e} Esc - 2nd Squadron
  - 3^{e} Esc - 3rd Squadron
- EEI - Reconnaissance Squadron
- EMR - Regimental Maintenance Squadron
- 5^{e} Esc - 5th Reserve Squadron

== Traditions ==
=== Insignia ===
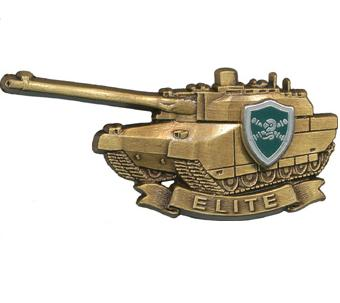
Insignia "Equipage élite" in bronze of the 501^{e}-503 Régiment de chars de combat.

== Regimental Commanders ==
- 1990–1992: Colonel Gallineau
- 1992–1994: Colonel d’Achon
- 1994–1996: Colonel de Parseval
- 1996–1998: Colonel Desportes
- 1998–2000: Colonel de Villiers
- 2000–2002: Colonel Houssay
- 2002–2004: Colonel Klotz
- 2004–2006: Colonel Goupil
- 2006–2008: Colonel Palu
- 2008–2009: Colonel Nimser (since August 1, 2009, the 501^{e}-503^{e} RCC was dissolved and was restructured under the designation of 501^{e} RCC).

== See also ==
- 31st Brigade
