= Leclerc (tank) =

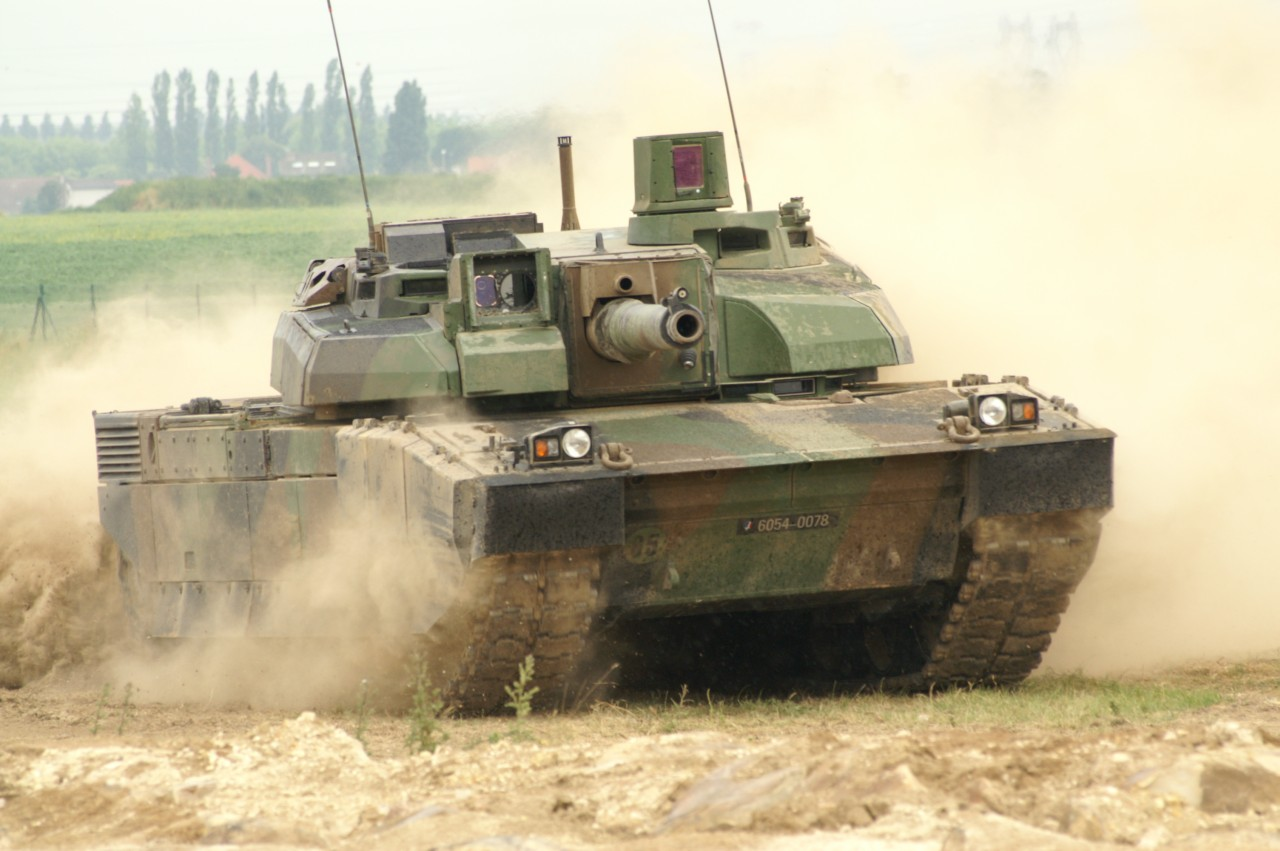
- Leclerc tank during military exercise
- Type: Main battle tank
- Place of origin: France

Service history
- In service: 1992–present
- Wars: Operation Joint Guardian; UNIFIL; Yemeni Civil War (2015–present)

Production history
- Designed: 1983–1989
- Manufacturer: KNDS France
- Unit cost: €16 million (FY2022)
- Produced: 1990–2008 (The last unit was produced in 2007 and the production line was closed, although Nexter retains the capability to build more if there is a need)
- No. built: ≈862

Specifications
- Mass: Series 1: 54.5 tonnes; Series 2: 56.3 tonnes; Series XXI: 57.4 tonnes
- Length: 9.87 m (6.88 without gun)
- Width: 3.60 m
- Height: 2.53 m
- Crew: 3 (Commander, gunner, driver)
- Armour: Modular composite armour SXXI version include titanium and semi-reactive layers.
- Main armament: GIAT CN120-26/52 120mm tank gun 40 rounds (1 round ready to fire in the chamber, 22 rounds inside the autoloader magazine with additional 18 rounds cylinder in the hull)
- Secondary armament: 12.7 mm coaxial M2HB machine gun (1,100 rounds); 7.62 mm machine gun (3,000 rounds)
- Engine: V8X SACM (Wärtsilä) 8-cylinder diesel engine 1,100 kW (1,500 hp)
- Power/weight: 27.52 hp/tonne
- Transmission: Automatic SESM
- Suspension: Hydropneumatic
- Fuel capacity: 1300 litres (1700 with fuel drums)
- Operational range: 550 km (342 mi), 650 km (404 mi) with external fuel
- Maximum speed: 71 km/h (44 mph) on the road; 55 km/h (34 mph) off-road

The Leclerc is a third-generation French main battle tank developed and manufactured by KNDS France. It was named in honour of Marshal Philippe Leclerc de Hauteclocque, a commander of the Free French Forces, who led the 2nd Armoured Division in World War II.

The Leclerc is in service with the French Army, Jordanian Army and the United Arab Emirates Army. In production since 1991, the Leclerc entered French service in 1992, replacing the AMX-30 as the country's main armoured platform. With production now complete, the French operate 222 Leclercs (with 184 more in storage, for a total of 406), while the United Arab Emirates (UAE) possesses 388.

Of the units in French service, 200 will be upgraded to the Leclerc XLR standard with deliveries expected to begin in 2022. During the Eurosatory 2024 presented Leclerc Evolution and EMBT ADT140, prototypes of the enhanced fourth-generation main battle tank.

== History ==
In 1964, studies were initiated about a possible replacement vehicle for the AMX-30 main battle tank: the Engin Principal Prospectif. In 1971, in view of the inferiority of the AMX-30 in comparison to the new generation of Soviet tanks about to be introduced, the Direction des Armements Terrestres ordered the beginning of the Char Futur project. In 1975, a working committee was created, and in 1977 it agreed on a list of specifications. In February 1980 however, a Memorandum of Understanding was signed with West Germany involving the joint development of a MBT, called the Napoléon I in France and Kampfpanzer III in Germany. Fundamental disagreements about its desired configuration led to a failure of this cooperation in December 1982. It was announced that a purely French battle tank would be developed, called "EPC" (Engin Principal de Combat). The importation of foreign equipment, like the M1 Abrams, the Leopard 2, or the Merkava, had been studied and rejected.

In contrast to most Western programmes of the time, more emphasis was placed on active than passive protection to limit overall vehicle mass. Mobility for evading enemy fire and fire control systems were given particular attention. Nevertheless, it was a stated design goal to achieve at least double the protection against KE-penetrators in comparison to the level attained in then-current MBTs of the fifty-ton weight class, the latter indicated at about 400 mm RHA equivalency. The higher level of protection would also protect against shaped charges.

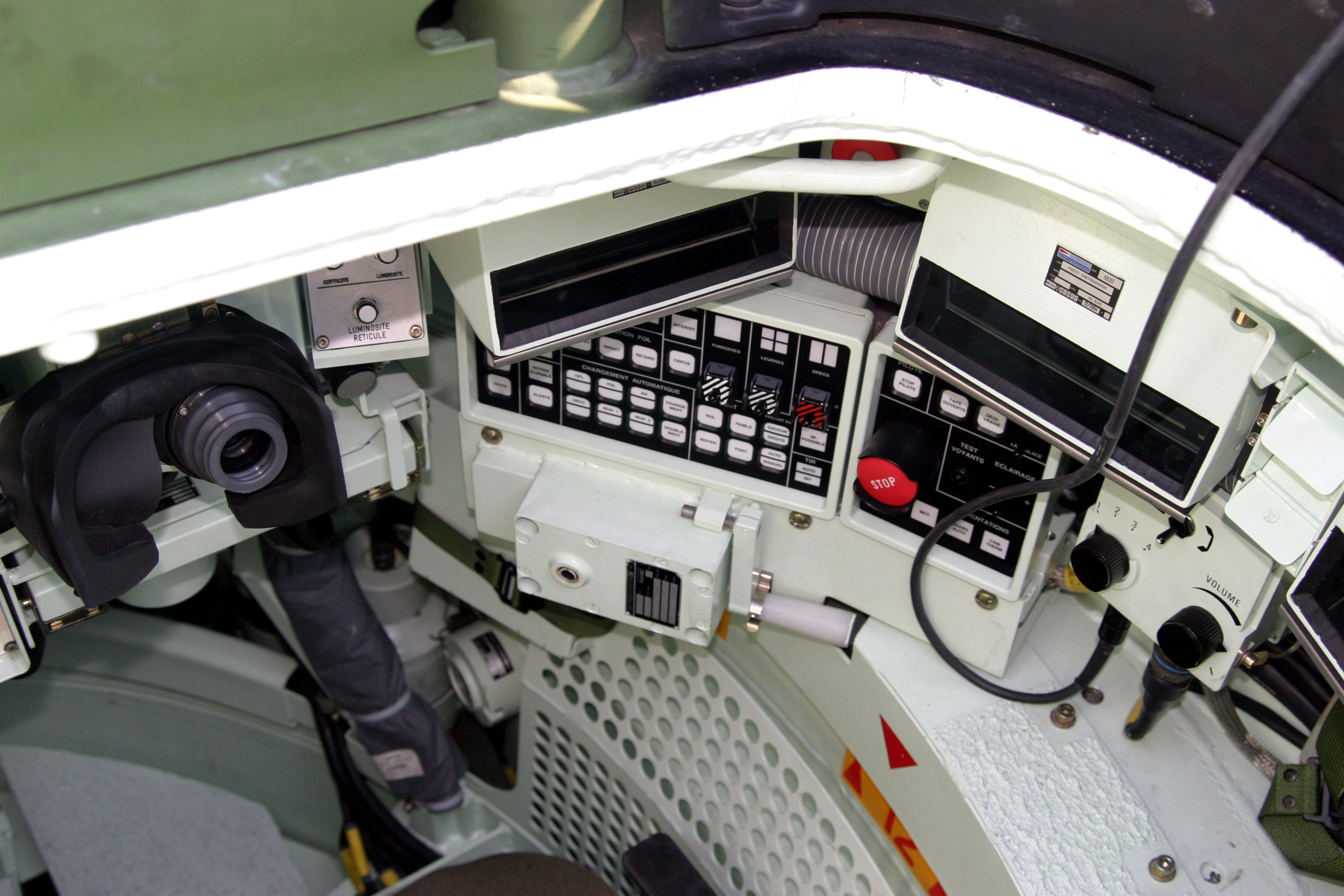
The gunner's position, looking down from the turret roof

Partnership with a foreign state was sought to limit unit cost, and found when the UAE ordered 436 vehicles, adding to the 426 units already planned for the French Army.

In 1986, the project was started under the name "Leclerc", and six prototypes were swiftly built. Mass production started in 1990 with the four-unit Batch 1, used mainly for comparative tests in foreign countries. The 17 units of Batch 2 shipped with turret and hull armour improvements, but were diagnosed with engine and suspension problems and quickly retired. Batch 3 followed with further improvements and used to define the doctrine of use as well as instruction. Batches 4 and 5 were better built, eliminating recurring powerplant problems, and are still in service after having been refitted in the late 1990s.

The second series started with Batch 6, with an added climate control system in the right rear of the turret. Batch 7 introduced a transmission system to the command vehicle, and a data system giving instantaneous vision of the state of all battle tanks and acquired targets. It also incorporated minor improvements in the visor. Batch 8 units had a modernised electronic system, and Batch 9 replaced the ATHOS thermal imaging with a SAGEM (now Safran Electronics & Defense) Iris providing better resolution.

In 2003, the Greek army sought to acquire a new tank and tested the T-80U, T-84, Leclerc, M1A2 Abrams, Challenger 2E and Leopard 2A5. The Leclerc received a perfect score at the firing range, with 20 rounds fired from 1500 and at 2000 m away. Its hunter-kill test performance was weaker, with the Leclerc scoring 13 out of 20, compared with 17 for the Leopard. Both the Leclerc and Leopard sustained a nine-round-per-minute firing rate, higher than those of the other tanks. The Leclerc achieved a 500 km range, higher than the others. But price tags seemed to be a determining factor and the Greek Army selected the Leopard.

All previous Leclerc batches were to be modernised to Batch 9 standards as of 2005. In 2004, Batch 10 was presented, incorporating a new armour package and information systems that could share the location of enemy and friendly units with all vehicles on the battlefield. This was the beginning of the 96-unit third series. By 2007, 355 tanks were to have been operational, 320 of them incorporated in four regiments, each with 80 Leclercs.

As of 2010, after a French defence review, each of the four regiments operated 60 Leclerc tanks for a total of 240 in operational units; with a further 100 in combat ready reserve. Due to financial cuts, only 254 tanks were fully operational in 2011.

=== Main Ground Combat System ===
In 2015, Nexter Systems merged with German Krauss-Maffei Wegmann (KMW), maker of the Leopard 2 tank, to form KMW+Nexter Defense Systems (KNDS), and the German Ministry of Defence announced plans to develop a new tank jointly with France as a successor to both the Leopard 2 and Leclerc tanks, named Main Ground Combat System (MGCS). At the 2018 Eurosatory, KNDS presented a technology demonstrator tank combining the hull of a Leopard 2A7 with the lighter, two-man turret of a Leclerc.

System architecture definition and technology demonstration phase was to be completed by 2024, with production and testing to start in 2028.

=== UAE bribery allegation ===
In September 2018, Der Spiegel reported that an intermediary in the $3 billion-plus UAE tank sale was paid a commission of nearly US$200 million, and that part of the sum may have been used to bribe government officials.

== Design ==
=== Armament ===
==== Primary ====
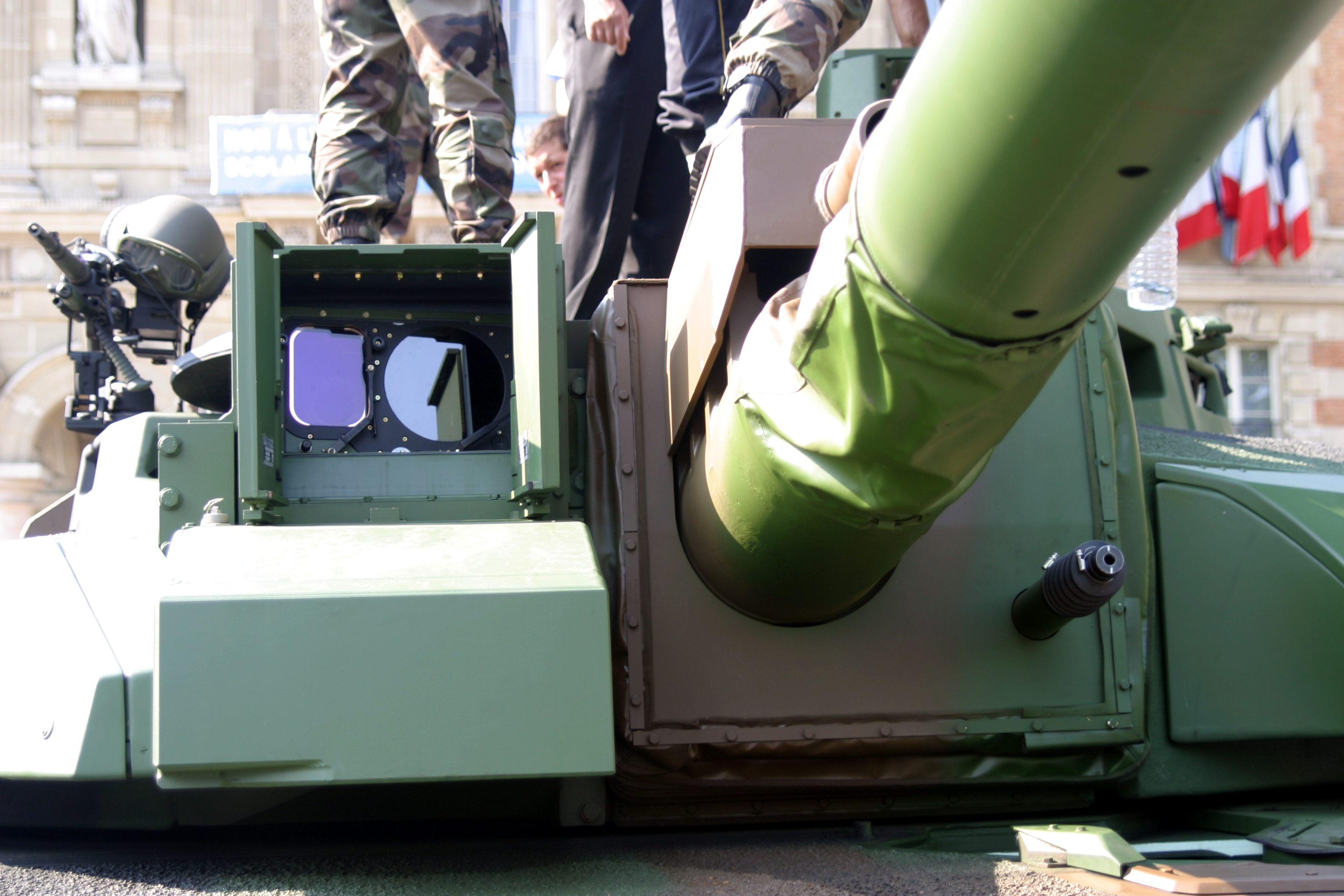
Closeup of the front of the turret; the 12.7 mm coaxial machine gun can be seen below and to the side of the 120 mm main gun.

The Leclerc is armed with a 120 mm version F1 smoothbore gun designed by the arsenal of Bourges (EFAB) under the designation of CN120-26. Its barrel is 52 calibres long instead of the 44 calibre common on most main battle tanks of its generation, giving the projectile a higher muzzle velocity.

The Modèle F1 is compatible with 120x570mm NATO ammunition. This gun features a magnesium alloy thermal sleeve and an automatic loading mechanism. Elevation (+20°), depression (-8°), and turret traverse (360°) are electrically powered. The Leclerc EMAT used by the French Army relies on compartment overpressure for barrel fume extraction while the UAE tropicalized Leclerc uses a compressed-air fume extraction system.

==== Autoloader ====
Located inside the turret bustle, the autoloader is designated CHA (French: Chargement Automatique, "automatic loading") and was designed by Creusot-Loire Industrie. The autoloader itself weighs 500 kg (empty) and has a total volume of 1.68 m^{3} (1.40 × 2.40 × 0.50 m). In case of ammunition cooking off, the deflagration is vented by two blow-out panels.

The autoloader allows the reloading of the gun while firing on the move, providing it a sufficient rate of fire to deal with six targets in one minute. The nominal firing sequence is below 8 seconds and the repetition rate (loading two ammunition of the same type one after another) is below 6 seconds. The autoloader is managed by a TM Motorola 68021 microprocessor.

The autoloader consists of a continuous link carrier magazine made of 22 cells and a rammer assembly. It can accommodate all types of ammunition that are to the NATO standard. Up to six different types of ammunition can be selected. The cell positions the selected round for loading. At the same time, the main gun is decoupled from the stabilization system, indexed to 1.8° elevation and locked in alignment with the loading gutter. Then, a telescopic rammer pushes the round from the cell into the gun breech via a fiberglass gutter. After loading, the weapon is automatically driven back to the specified angle in accordance with the fire control system. In case of a power outage, the conveyor can be put into motion by using a hand-cranked electric generator.

The ammunition is normally inserted in the autoloader through a port in the rear wall of the turret bustle. A control panel allows the autoloader cells to be rotated to present a new empty cell. Two barcode readers identify the introduced ammunition in order to manage its position in the conveyor at any time. If the ammunition does not have a barcode, its type is entered through the control keyboard. It is possible to replenish the autoloader under armour, through a port in the inner bulkhead by using the 18 rounds cylinder located to the right of the driver's position.

==== Secondary ====
The Leclerc is also equipped with a 12.7 mm coaxial M2 heavy machine gun and a turret-mounted 7.62 mm machine gun, whereas most other NATO tanks use 7.62 mm weapons for both their coaxial and top machine gun mounts; the major exception is the American M1 Abrams, which has a 7.62 mm coaxial machine gun and two top-mounted machine guns, one 7.62 mm and one 12.7 mm.

=== Fire control and observation ===
The last 96 MBT XL Leclerc tanks have the ICONE TIS battle management system with digital communication system which integrates data from other tanks and upper levels of command. Since 2009, all the Leclerc tanks in service (S2 and SXXI) have ICONE BMS. The digital fire control system can be operated independently by the gunner or the commander, and it offers real time integrated imaging from all of the tank's sensors and sights, including the gunner's SAVAN 20 stabilised sight, developed by SAGEM (now Safran Electronics & Defense).

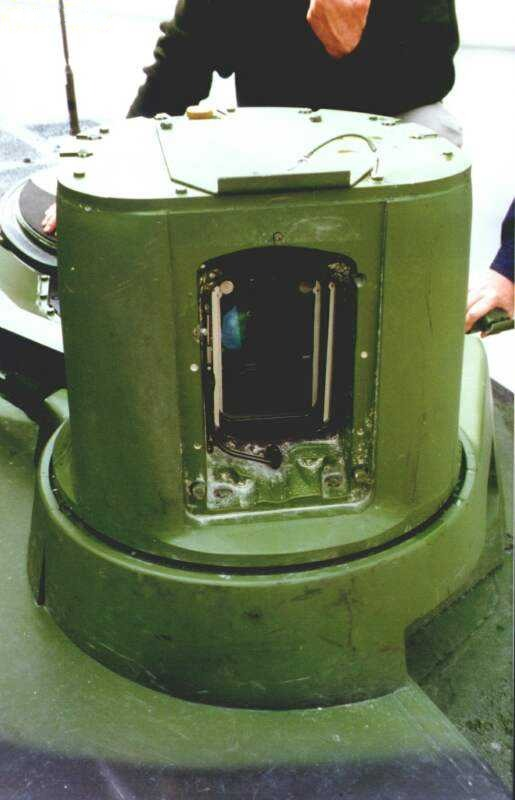
The commander's HL 70 panoramic sight

The Leclerc tank features the HL 60 gunner's primary sight from SAGEM (now Safran Electronics & Defense). The sight has two day channels; a direct one with ×3.3 and ×10 magnification (×14 in case of the UAE version) and a video channel with ×10 magnification. The thermal channel offers ×3 and ×10 magnifications. The Athos thermal imager has a detection range of 5000 m, can recognize targets at 2500 m and identify them at 2000 m. The laser range finder is of the Nd:YAG type. No emergency or auxiliary sights are mounted.

The tank commander can observe the surroundings through 7 episcopes and the SFIM HL 70 stabilized panoramic sight. The HL 70 is equipped with a day channel at ×2.5 and ×10 magnification and a night channel with ×2.5 magnification. The UAE tropicalized Leclerc uses the improved HL 80 panoramic sight which features an electronic zoom ×2 and a laser range finder of the Nd:YAG type. The image intensifier is replaced by an Alis thermal imager. The Leclerc SXXI uses the HL 120 panoramic sight that incorporates an Iris thermal imager. Both sights are also equipped with a semi-auto tracker for target acquisition. The combination of the gunner's primary sight and commander's panoramic sight allows the Leclerc to operate in a hunter-killer mode.

=== Protection ===
==== Thermal signature ====
A feature of the Hyperbar system used by the V8X1500 engine is that it does not emit visible smoke during acceleration, allowing to reduce the infrared signature of the tank. The exhaust temperature of the TM-307B gas turbine never exceeds 370 °F (188 °C), whatever the engine speed.

==== Ballistic ====
The AMX-APX armament institution was responsible for the studies related to the configuration and the integration of the new ballistic protection concepts.

Original protection requirements were sent by the EPC project manager to AMX-APX on February 8, 1980. The protection of the future French main battle tank must guarantee a certain degree of invulnerability against 125 mm APFSDS and 130 mm shaped-charges warheads over its frontal arc. The whole fighting compartment must be protected against RPG-7 warheads and all-around protection should be provided against threats such as 30 mm autocannons.

Stéphane Ferrard (1947-2015), a military historian and French journalist, stated in his book, "The Leclerc System", that:

Over its 60-degree frontal arc, the tank should be able to withstand multiple impacts of APFSDS ammunition belonging to the largest caliber currently available on the market.

The turret and the hull are made of welded steel plates with a thickness ranging from 30 mm to 50 mm on which removable composite armour modules are mounted. Twelve modules surround the turret (six per side); they are numbered 1 to 6, starting from the front end. The modules are covered by an anti-slip coating made of fiberglass. The turret bustle that contains the autoloader is protected on both sides against 30 mm armour-piercing rounds and shoulder-fired anti-tank weapon such as the RPG-7. The composite storage boxes around and on the turret play a triple role: carrying the tool set, reducing radar cross-section and acting as spaced armour.

Structural self-sealing fuel tanks are located to the right forward part of the hull, in front and above the ammunition drum. Six heavy ballistic side skirts protect the front third of the hull sides; each is made of a composite panel covered by a steel outer shell.

===== SXXI =====
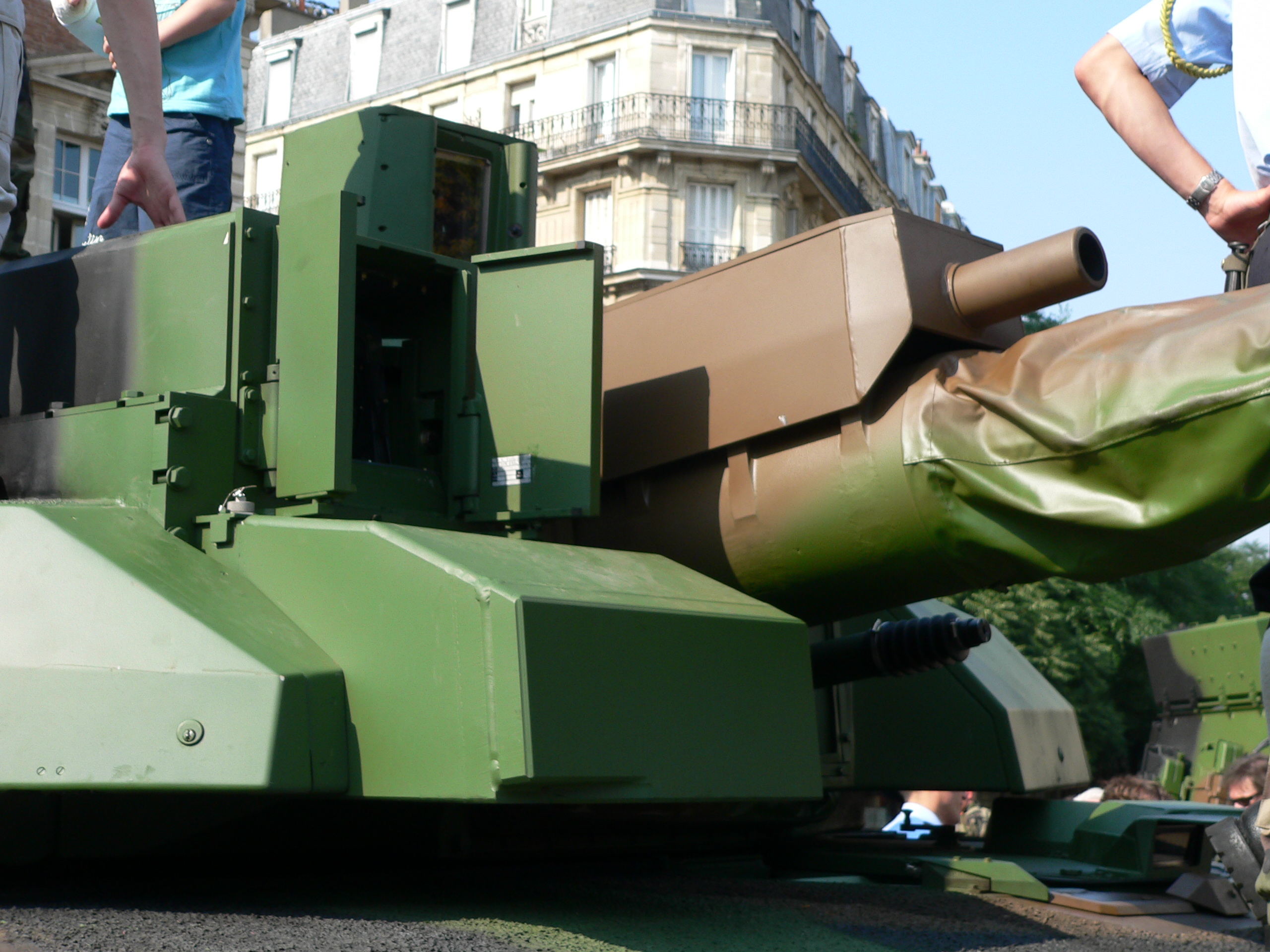
The extended composite armour block under the HL 130 gunner sight of a Leclerc SXXI

At the end of 1990s, a study was initiated to protect the Leclerc tank against the latest threats. These included ATGMs with tandem shaped-charge warheads capable of penetrating more than 1000 mm of RHA steel, as well as long-rod APFSDS with a length-to-diameter ratio of 30:1 with penetration performance exceeding 700 mm of RHA.

The technical approach consisted of replacing the passive composite modules protecting both sides of the turret bustle with lighter, reactive modules, incorporating semi-reactive layers. This weight-saving measure allowed the use of titanium in the ballistic protection of the turret frontal arc. It also shifted the center of gravity towards the front of the turret, closer to the traverse axis, facilitating the dynamic laying of the turret drives.

Block 10 and 11 (T10 and T11) Leclerc SXXI tanks are recognizable by their add-on ceramic armour plates bolted on the top of the reactive modules, protecting both sides of the autoloader compartment.

==== Passive counter-measures ====
Fourteen 80 mm dispensers of the Lacroix GALIX self-defence system are mounted onto the rear part of the turret. The French Army uses four types of ammunition:

- Galix 3: three smoke grenades creating an opaque screen in the visual range for 50 seconds
- Galix 4: two fragmentation grenades
- Galix 6: one infrared decoy with a burn time of 10 seconds
- Galix 13: three smoke grenades creating an opaque screen in the visual and infrared ranges for 30 seconds

=== Propulsion ===
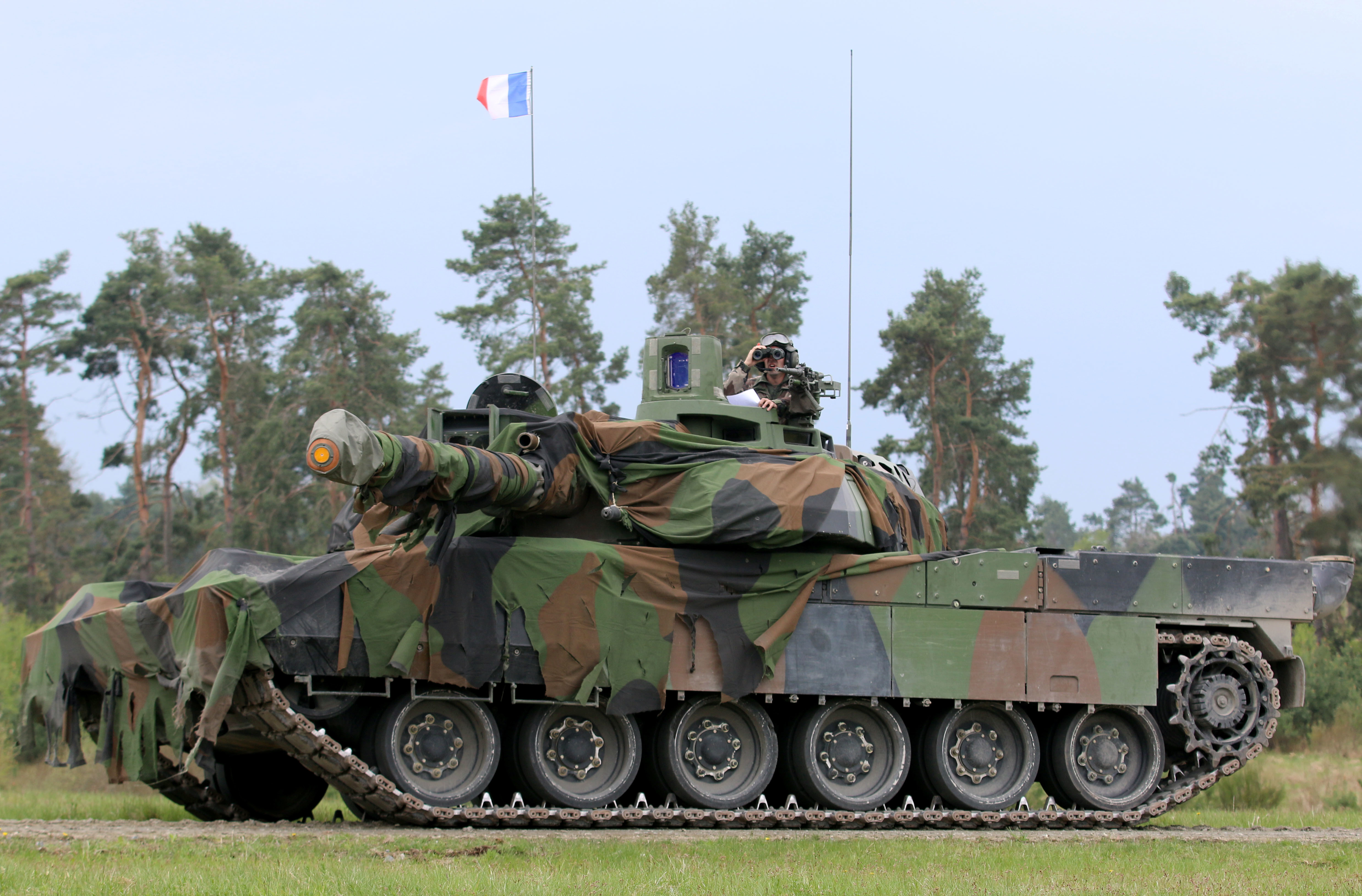
French Army Leclerc tank navigating a course during exercise Strong Europe Tank Challenge in 2017.

The Leclerc has an eight-cylinder SACM (now Wärtsilä) V8X-1500 1,500 hp Hyperbar diesel engine and a SESM (now Renk AG) automatic transmission, with five forward and two reverse gears. The official maximum speed by road is 71 km/h and 55 km/h cross country (speeds in excess of 80 km/h were reported on road). The maximum range is given as 550 km, and can be extended to 650 km with removable external tanks. The "hyperbar" system integrates a small Turbomeca TM 307B gas turbine in the engine, acting both as a turbocharger and an APU giving auxiliary power to all systems when the main engine is shut down. The Hyperbar name comes from the unusually high boost pressure of 7.5 bar and the resulting mean effective pressure of 32.1 bar. For comparison, the turbocharged diesel engine in a typical passenger car has a mean effective pressure of about 20 bar. In addition, with boost available even when idling, this arrangement also works as an antilag system.

With a combat weight of 56 tons, the Leclerc is very light compared to most main battle tanks in the world, though still considerably heavier than Soviet and later Russian designs. This gives it one of the best power-to-weight ratios among Western tanks (27 hp per ton) and makes it among one of the fastest MBTs of its generation (0 to 32 km/h in 5 seconds).

The engine exhaust, exiting at the rear left, is cooled to reduce the thermal signature of the Leclerc. Transmission is hydromechanical, with five forward and two reverse gears. Fuel tanks carry 1,300 litres and act as extra protection for the tank; two 200-litre external tanks can be fitted on the rear of the hull, though they have to be jettisoned before entering combat because they limit turret rotation.

The gearbox is equipped with a hydrokinetic retarder, which can slow the Leclerc down at a deceleration rate of 7 m/s (0.7 g) which is automatically used over 30 km/h.

== Operational history ==
The four regiments which operate the Leclerc are:

- 1e régiment de chasseurs stationed near Verdun, part of the 7th Armoured Brigade
- 4e régiment de dragons stationed in Carnoux-en-Provence, part of the 7th Armoured Brigade
- 12e régiment de cuirassiers stationed in Olivet, part of the 2nd Armoured Brigade
- 501e régiment de chars de combat stationed in Mourmelon-le-Grand, 2nd Armoured Brigade

In service since 1992 (after the Persian Gulf War), the Leclerc has mostly seen deployment in low-intensity conflicts, including 15 Leclerc stationed in Kosovo (KFOR) and 13 others deployed in south Lebanon until 2010 for the UNIFIL peacekeeping operations, during which their performance was judged satisfactory by French officials.

As of August 2015, Leclerc tanks of the UAE were deployed in combat operations in Yemen (near Aden) as part of the Saudi-led coalition. It is estimated that 70 Leclerc MBTs were deployed by the UAE in Yemen, 15 of them equipped with the AZUR package. During one month, three tanks were damaged, two by antitank mines and one by an RPG, which damaged the grid without piercing the hull. One of the episcopes was hit by a ATGM, possibly of Konkurs or Konkurs-M type, killing the driver and injuring the commander's legs. None of these tanks were completely destroyed.

During the Iron Spear exercise, October 2019, Leclerc tanks crewed by the Lynx 6 Tactical Inter-Service Sub-Group (S-GTIA) participated in an inter-alliance exercise and surpassed the American M1A2 Abrams, German, Spanish and Norwegian Leopard 2s, Italian C1 Ariete and Polish PT-91.

As part of Mission Aigle, Leclerc tanks of the 1st Chasseur Regiment, 7th Armoured Brigade were deployed to Romania in November 2022. Currently, there are 13 tanks deployed with the Battle Group Forward Presence.

== Variants and upgrades ==
=== Built ===
Séries 1: original production model, 134 produced.

S1OP Série 1 Opérationnelle: refers to the 82 serviceable Leclerc S1 that were upgraded to the RT5 standard.

Séries 2: perfected model with the ability to be deployed in desert environments, 176 produced.

- new NBC system which integrates a hybrid air conditioner.
- independent air conditioning unit installed on the back roof behind the gunner's hatch.
- In order to balance the turret with the addition of the air conditioner, the turret frontal armour is thickened a few centimetres ahead of the commander's station.
- revised sprocket cooling fins.
- extra splash guard added to the front hull.
- Remote operated hydraulic track tensioner.
- bolt-on appliqué armour on each hull sponsons.
- Athos thermal camera on the gunner's sight is replaced by the new Iris thermal camera since the block 9 (T9).
- SIT ICONE battlefield management system added in 2009

S2OP Série 2 Opérationnelle: refers to the 137 serviceable Leclerc S2.

Séries XXI: 96 produced.

- New composite front armour package containing titanium. Turret bustle composite armour has been replaced by a lighter explosive reactive armour.
- Turret storage bins have been tailored for the larger armour package.
- The commander has now the HL 120 panoramic sight which now features a laser rangefinder and the Iris thermal camera.
- Higher electrical turret output.
- IFF indicator.
- SIT ICONE battlefield management system.

Leclerc XLR: modernization project of the French Army Leclerc S2 and SXXI. 18 Leclerc will be retrofitted to the XLR standard in 2023, 200 Leclerc XLR are expected by 2029.

- Common SCORPION vetronics such as the SICS battlefield management system and CONTACT radio and Blue force tracking.
- New fire control system adapted to the new 120 mm HE M3M multi-mode programmable high-explosive round.
- FN Herstal T2B remote weapon station.
- Obsolescence management of the V8X1500 engine, especially its Turboméca TM-307B gas turbine.
- Mine protection belly plate.
- BARRAGE IED jammer.
- Add-on composite side armour modules from the AZUR urban warfare kit.
- Slat armour.

Tropicalized Leclerc version sold to the UAE; it is fitted with:

- EuroPowerPack with the 1,100 kW MT883 diesel engine built by the German MTU Friedrichshafen company - the UAE has interests in this company and preferred the engine to be built by them.
- Extended hull with increased fuel capacity.
- Externally mounted diesel auxiliary power unit with a tank infantry telephone fitted on its armoured box.
- Redesigned engine compartment (louver, access panels).
- Engine-driven mechanical heavy-duty air-conditioning mounted in the left part of the hull.
- HL-80 commander panoramic sight with Alis thermal camera and laser rangefinder.
- ATO (Armement Télé-Opéré) remote-controlled weapon station for a 7.62 mm FN MAG machine-gun operated under-armour by the HL-80 panoramic sight.
- Leclerc Battlefield Management System (LBMS).
- Completely automated driving and turret functions with pictograms on the buttons for use by crew with only basic training.
- Thermal tarp.
- Some bustle storage bins are replaced by baskets.

Leclerc T4: Prototype with an elongated turret built in 1996. It was armed with a 140 mm smoothbore gun designed by the arsenal of Bourges (EFAB). In order to avoid being scrapped, the prototype turret was restored in the 2010s and mounted on a former Leclerc hull which was used in its last years as a towing vehicle. Following its restoration, the tank was nicknamed Terminateur (Terminator) by the director of the technical section of the French Army (Section Technique de l'Armée de Terre or STAT), who did everything to preserve this technological demonstrator. In 2017, the Terminateur was presented with the experimental Scorpion camouflage.

Leclerc EPG Engin Principal du Génie: "main engineering vehicle": armoured engineering, one prototype built in 2001

Leclerc MARS (Moyen Adapté de Remorquage Spécifique): Leclerc S1 converted into an armoured recovery vehicle due to decreased order of Leclerc DNG (20 instead of 30). The main gun, the sights and the autoloader are removed to make it 5 tonnes lighter. Leclerc DNG Dépanneur Nouvelle Génération: recovery tank deployed as of 2004

Leclerc AZUR Action en Zone URbaine: urban warfare kit for actions in urban areas. Some elements of the kit such as the add-on composite armour were bought by the UAE Army for their tropicalized Leclerc operating in Yemen.

=== Proposed concept ===
- Leclerc PTG (Poseur de Travure du Génie): proposed bridgelayer variant developed in 1996, no prototypes were built.
- Leclerc 'Flakpanzer' SPAAG: Early 1990s proposal of a Leclerc fitted with a turret derived from that of the German Flakpanzer Gepard. It was imagined as armed with twin 35 mm Oerlikon KDA autocannons and two twin pack Mistral SAM launchers (total of four ready missiles). It was not adopted for service due to post-Cold War defence cutbacks.
- Leclerc Crotale: A proposal from the same time period to fit the Crotale NG SAM system to a Leclerc chassis. Intended primarily to protect armoured formations on the move against aerial attack. Again not proceeded with due to cutbacks. No prototype known to have been built.
- Leclerc V2C 2010 (Véhicule de combat de choc): A concept from early 2000s featuring installation of modular armor on the turret roof to protect the crew and autoloader, SPATEM hard-kill active protection system featuring two or four twin-barelled counter-projectile launchers, KBCM (Kit Basique pour Contre-Mesures pour Blindes) protection kit consisting of infra-red jammer, missile launch detection, laser warning receivers and additional GALIX grenade launchers, and armor enhancements featuring anti-mine protection, metal screens and rubber skirts. The upgrade proposal also included tactical UAV launch system. Only a scale mock-up was presented in 2002.
- Leclerc Koufra, or Leclerc T40: A proposal from the late 2000s to convert existing Séries 1 vehicles into a 'heavy' reconnaissance scout, primarily for urban warfare. The conversion included a brand new turret incorporating a CTA CT40 Case Telescoped Weapon System (CTWS) as well as grenade launchers, along with provision for two side-mounted anti-tank missiles.

== Classified manual leak ==
In October 2021, in an attempt to win an argument in the official forums of the war simulation game War Thunder, a crewman allegedly leaked excerpts of the tank's classified manual. Forum moderators quickly removed the documents from their website, stating that they could not use the said classified documents due to legal problems that would ensue.

== Technical data ==
Description	Leclerc Série 1	Leclerc Série 2	Leclerc Série XXI	Tropicalized Leclerc
Produced	132	178	96	388
Date	1992–1996	1997-2003	2003-2008	1994 – early 2000s
Batch	T1 to T5	T6 to T9	T10 to T11	Not applicable
Crew	3			
Combat weight	54.5 t	56.3 t	57.6 t	57 t
Hull weight	36 t	37 t	37.5 t	
Turret weight	18.5 t	19 t	20.5 t	x
Gunner sight	HL 60		HL 130	HL 60
Commander panoramic sight	HL 70		HL 120	HL 80
Engine	SACM V8X Hyperbar 8-cylinder diesel engine			MTU MT 883 Ka 500 12-cylinder diesel engine
Engine displacement	16,470 cm^{3}			27,361 cm^{3}
Forced induction ratio	7.8			3
Power output	1500 hp (1,118 kW) at 2500 RPM			1500 hp (1,118 kW) at 2700 RPM
Maximum torque	4850 Nm at 1700 RPM			4545 Nm at 2000 RPM
Acceleration from 0–32 km/h (0–20 mph)	5 seconds	5.5 seconds		6 seconds
Transmission	SESM ESM 500			Renk HSWL 295 TM
Suspension system	12 SAMM ESO twin-cylinder oleopneumatic suspension			
Tracks	V2 (aluminium alloy)		V5 (steel)	V2, V5 and Diehl 570
Maximum speed	71 km/h (backwards 38 km/h)			
Fuel capacity	1,300 liters (up to 1700 liters with external fuel drums)			1,420 liters (up to 1820 liters with external fuel drums)
Hull length	6.88 m			7.03 m
Width	3.43 m (3.60 m with ballistic side skirts and 3.71 m with side-view mirrors)			
Height	2.53 m (turret roof)			
Ground clearance	500 mm			
Wading depth without preparation	1.1 m			
Wading depth with snorkel	4 m			Not applicable
Trench passability	3 m			
Climbing ability	1.1 m			
Turret rotation time (360°)	12 seconds		9 seconds	12 seconds

== Operators ==
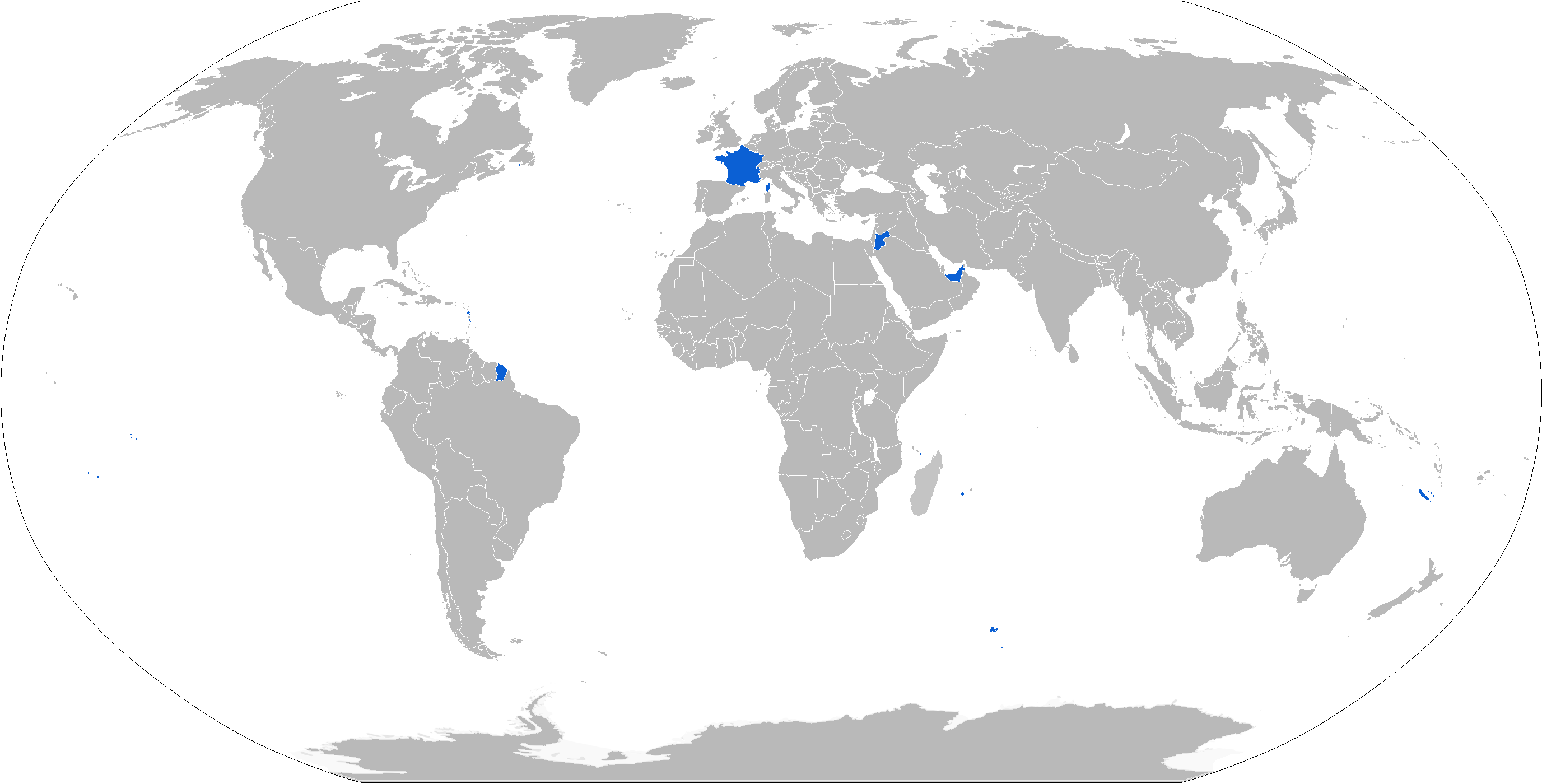
Map of MBT Leclerc operators.

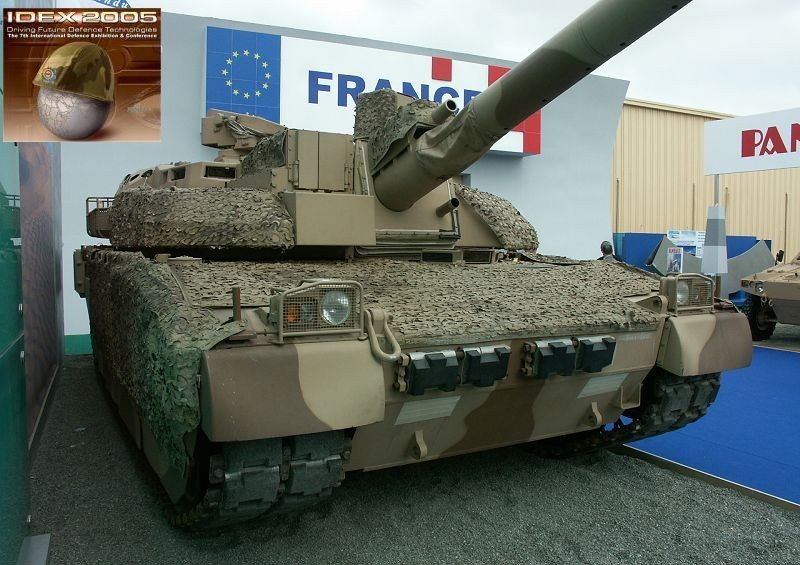
A United Arab Emirates Army Leclerc on display in IDEX 2005 defense Exhibition in Abu Dhabi.

- France: 166 Leclerc and 34 Leclerc XLR in service as of 2025.
- United Arab Emirates: 268 Leclerc in service as of 2025. Originally 436 tanks.
- Jordan: 70 Leclerc in service as of 2025. 80 Tanks were donated by United Arab Emirates.

=== Potential operators ===
- Cyprus: Cyprus may get second-hand tanks to replace the T-80U
- India: In January 2022 Nexter officials were contacted by India on participating in the Future Ready Combat Vehicle program with the proposal of the Leclerc XLR MBT.
- Croatia: In April 2022 talks were held between Nexter representatives and Croatian delegation about possible acquisition of Leclerc XLR tanks for Croatian Army.
- Ukraine: In January 2023, French President Macron stated that he was considering sending Leclerc tanks to the Ukrainian Ground Forces.

== Examples on display ==
- Example on display at the Musée des Blindés in Saumur, France.

== See also ==
- List of main battle tanks by generation

== Bibliography ==
- Chassillan, Marc (2005). Char Leclerc: De la guerre froide aux conflits de demain.
- Chassillan, Marc (2001). Raids Hors-série N.3: les chars de combat en action.
- IISS (2020). The Military Balance 2020. Routledge. ISBN 978-0367466398.
- International Institute for Strategic Studies (12 February 2025). The Military Balance 2025. London: Routledge. ISBN 978-1-003-63076-0.
