= 7th Armoured Brigade (France) =

- 7^{e} Brigade blindée
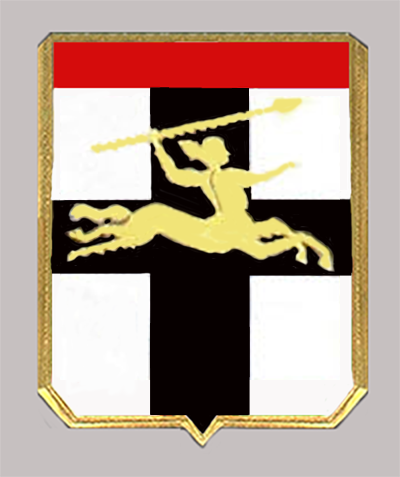
- Badge
- Active: 1999 - present
- Country: France
- Branch: French Army
- Type: Armour
- Size: ~ 8,000 personnel
- Part of: 1st Division
- Garrison/HQ: Besançon
- Motto(s): Force et Audace ("Strength and daring")

The 7th Armoured Brigade (French: 7^{e} Brigade blindée) is an armoured brigade of the French Army. It carries on the traditions and honours of the 7th Armoured Division.

== Organization ==
The organisation of the brigade as of 2022 is:

- Headquarters and Staff, in Besançon
- 7éme Compagnie de Commandement et de Transmissions – Command & Signals Company, in Besançon
- 1st Chasseur Regiment – Armoured Regiment, in Thierville-sur-Meuse
- 5éme Régiment de Dragons – Combined Armoured Regiment, in Mailly-le-Camp
- 35éme Régiment d'Infanterie – Armoured Infantry, in Belfort
- 152éme Régiment d'Infanterie – Armoured Infantry, in Colmar
- 1ére Régiment de Tirailleurs – Armoured Infantry, in Epinal
- 68éme Régiment d'Artillerie d'Afrique – Mobile Artillery, in La Valbonne
- 3éme Régiment du Génie – Engineers, in Charleville-Mézières
- Le Centre de Formation Initiale des Militaires du Rang 7e Brigade Blindée – 3éme Régiment de Chasseurs d'Afrique, in Valdahon (Initial brigade training centre)
