= Side cap =

Foldable military cap

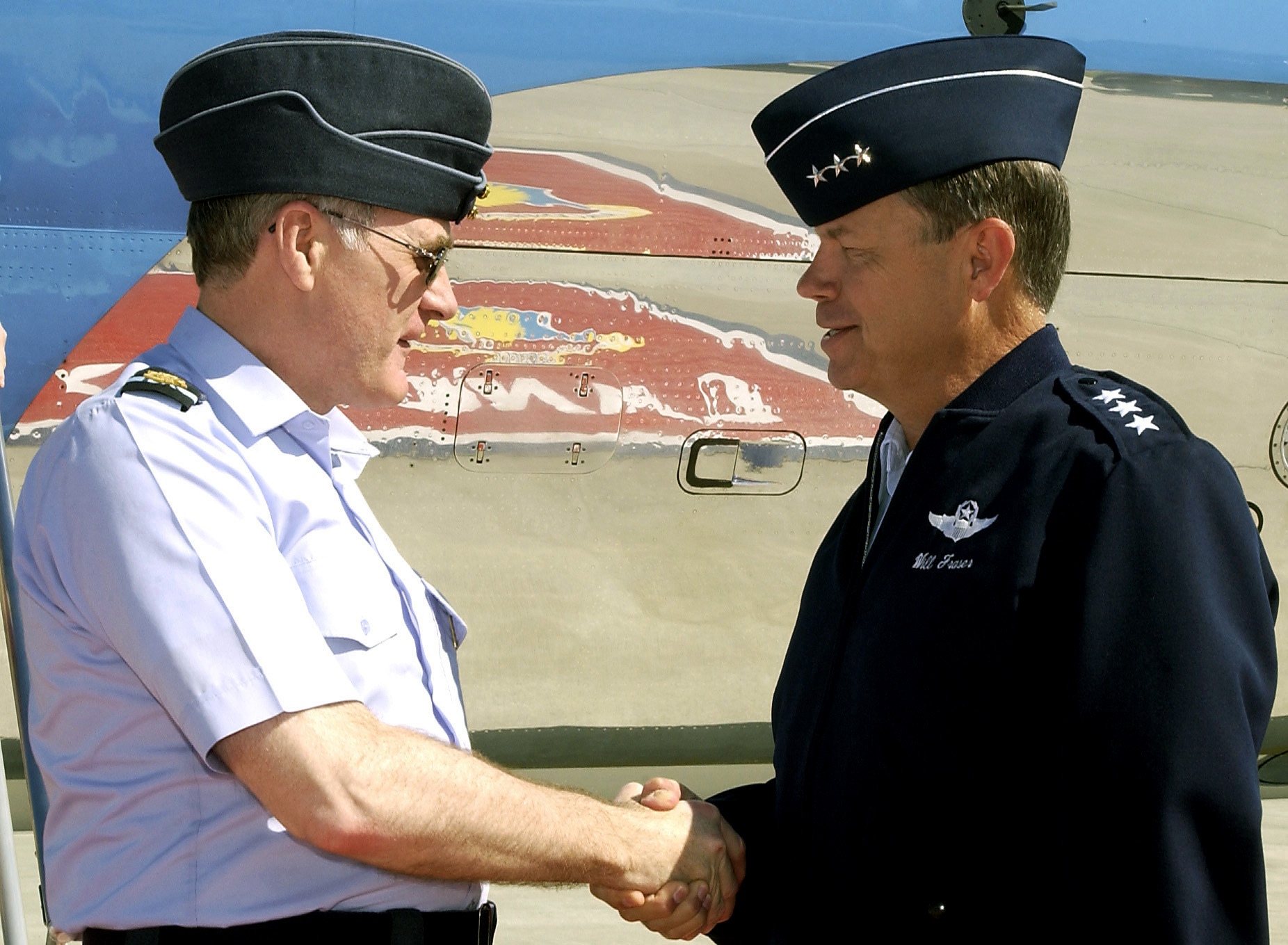
Senior Royal Air Force and United States Air Force officers wearing flight caps

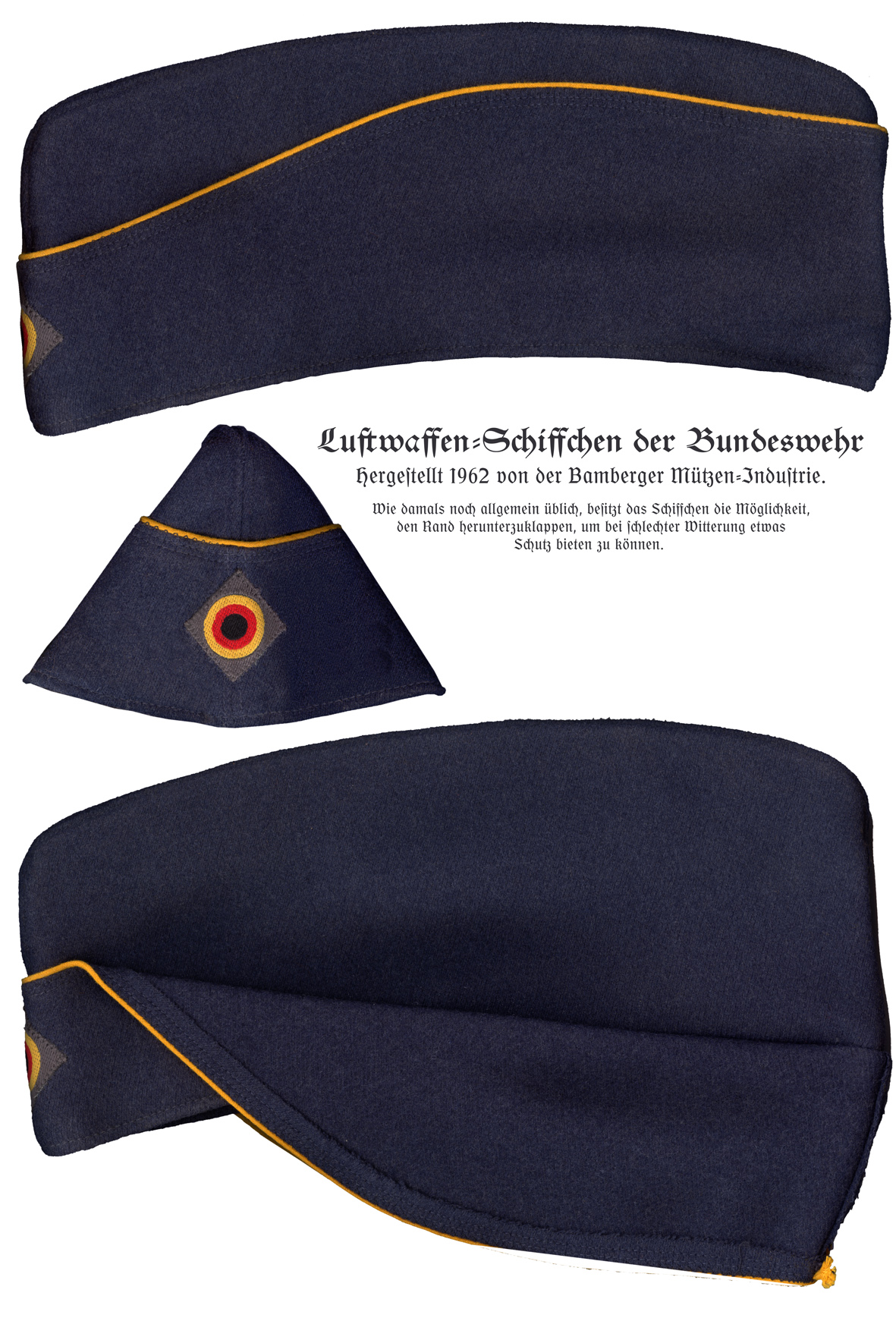
German Air Force Garrison cap (Schiffchen "little boat") from 1962 with flaps up (top) and flaps folded down (bottom). Transalation: Air Force side cap of the German Federal Armed Forces, manufactured in 1962 by the Bamberg cap industry. As was common at the time, the cap has the option of folding down the brim to offer some protection in bad weather.

A side cap is a military cap that can be folded flat when not being worn. It is also known as a garrison cap or flight cap in the United States, a wedge cap in Canada, or a field service cap in the United Kingdom. In form the side cap is comparable to the glengarry, a folding version of the Scottish military bonnet. It has been associated with various military forces since the middle of the 19th century, as well as various civilian organizations.

== Australia ==
All ranks of the Royal Australian Air Force (RAAF) are entitled to wear the blue garrison cap with appropriate cap badge as an optional item with General Purpose Uniform (GPU), Service Dress (SD) and Flying Dress (FD) uniforms. The piping of the garrison cap for air officers is light blue, the piping for all other ranks is solid blue.

== Canada ==
=== Army ===
In the Canadian Armed Forces, the field service cap (French: calot de campagne) is defined by the Canadian Forces Dress Instructions as a "cloth folding or 'wedge cap'...Originally designed for wear during field operations and training, it may now also be worn as an undress cap with full and undress uniforms." The cap is worn as part of the undress uniform by students of Royal Military College of Canada, and as an optional item by all ranks of rifle regiments with ceremonial dress, mess dress, and service dress uniforms.

The field service cap was originally adopted army-wide in 1939, and replaced in 1943 by a khaki beret. The coloured field service cap was a variant permitted for private purchase and worn only when off duty. These were in the colours of the regiment or corps of the wearer.

=== Air Force ===
For personnel who wear air force uniform, the blue wedge cap (French: calot) is authorized for wear with all orders of dress, save for the combat uniform. It is properly worn "on the right side of the head, centred front and back, with the front edge of the cap 2.5 centimetres (1 in) above the right eyebrow." Cap badges are worn on the left side, with the centre of the badge 6.5 centimetres (2 1/2 in) from the front of the cap centred between the flap and the top seam. The cap worn by general officers is embellished with silver piping. Air force military police in dress uniform wear a scarlet flash in the front of their wedge caps showing 1 centimetre (3/8 in). Air force members of Canadian Special Operations Forces Command wear a tan flash in the front of their wedge caps.

Prior to Unification in 1968, the Royal Canadian Air Force wore uniforms similar to those worn by the Royal Air Force, including a blue wedge cap. After 1968, the uniforms of the three services were replaced by a universal rifle-green uniform; the air force, however, was permitted to retain the wedge cap, although in rifle green instead of blue. With the advent of the Distinct Environmental Uniform, the blue wedge cap returned.

The wedge cap is also the official headdress of the Royal Canadian Air Force Association and the Royal Canadian Air Cadets.

== Finland ==
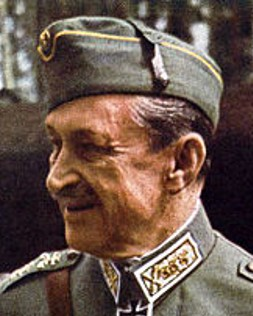
Marshal of Finland Carl Gustav Emil Mannerheim wearing a side cap

In Finland, side caps, historically referred as boat-shaped field hats or ylioppilaslakki / military side caps like the m/22 Field hat and turkislakki m/22 "turkissuikka" Fur hat, are traditional military and student headwear designs from Finland.

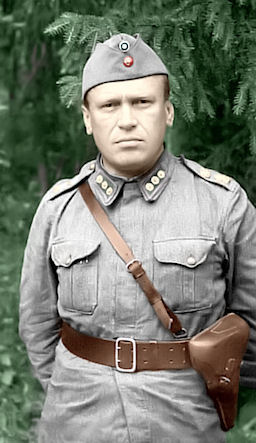

== France ==
The French bonnet de police (or "calot") originated as a long, pointed headdress, with a tassel at the end of the trailing crown (or flamme). Gradually the flamme grew shorter until by the mid-nineteenth century the bonnet de police had become a true folding cap with no trailing crown. Instead the tassel dangled from a short cord sewn onto front point of the crown, hanging above the soldier's right eye. This style of headdress with a hanging tassel was widely worn by both the Belgian Army and the Spanish Army during the first half of the 20th century. It is still used by the Spanish Foreign Legion.

When reintroduced for undress or fatigue wear in 1891 the French army's bonnet de police had become a plain item of dress without decoration. The colour of this working cap matched that of the tunic with which it was worn (either dark blue, light blue or black prior to World War I; horizon blue from 1915 to 1930; and thereafter khaki). In 1915 the bonnet de police generally replaced the kepi for other ranks during the remainder of the First World War, because of its greater convenience when the Adrian steel helmet was issued.

Between 1944 and 1962, however, this headdress was worn by most branches of the French Army in a wide variety of colours, which normally matched those of the kepis historically worn by the particular branch or regiment. Line infantry caps for example had a dark blue base with a red top. In 1959 the bonnet de police was replaced by the beret for most units.

In the modern French Army the bonnet de police is worn by the 1st Spahi Regiment in the historic bright red of this branch and, since 2017, by the 1st Tirailleur Regiment in light blue. The bonnet de police is also worn by the servicemen of the French Gendarmerie and the Compagnies Républicaines de Sécurité (CRS), the riot units of the French National Police. Members of these units may have to change quickly from an ordinary headdress to a helmet, and an easily foldable cap is therefore practical.

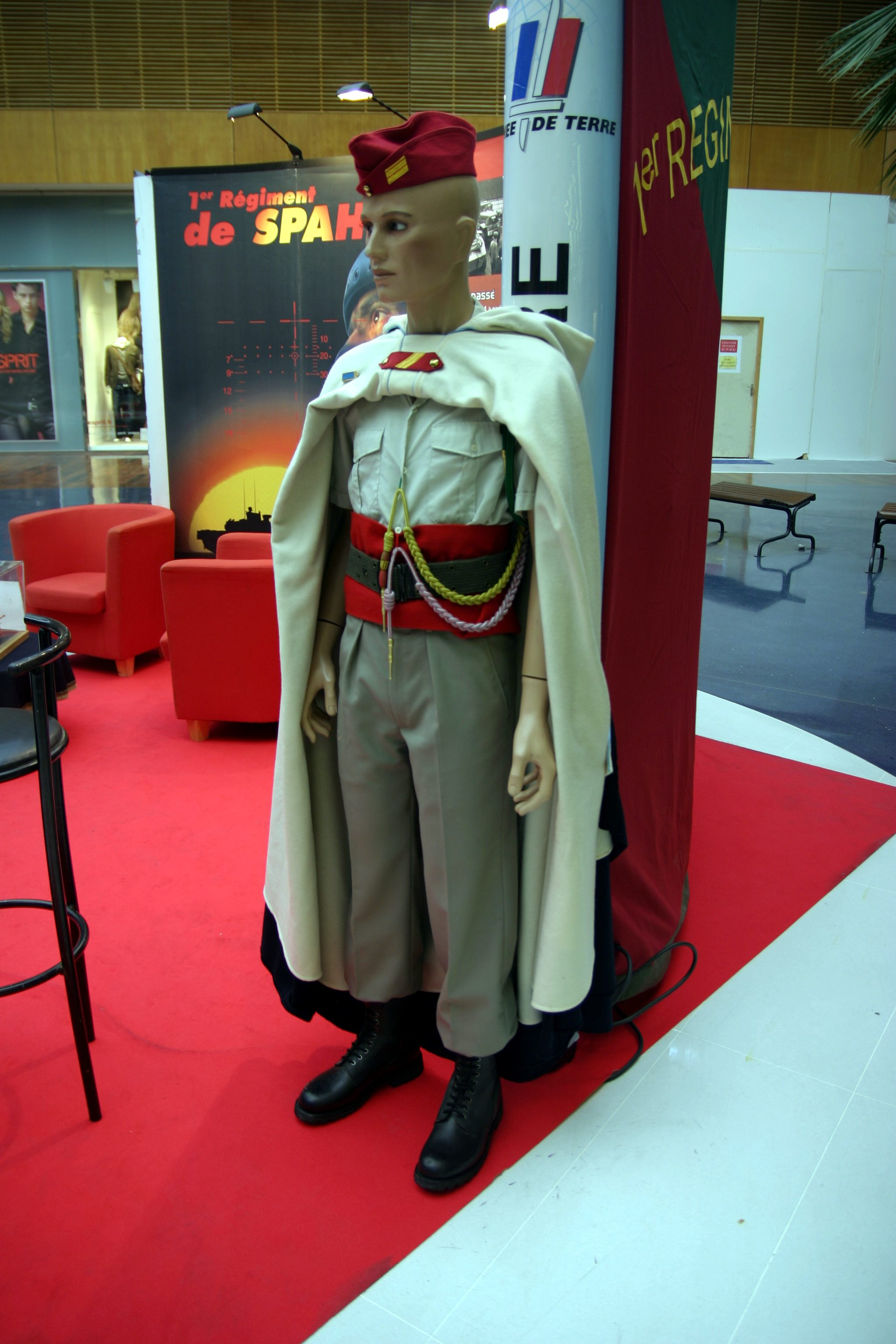
French Spahi uniform today: 2006 pattern parade uniform for a maréchal des logis of the 1st Spahi Regiment, with red bonnet de police and distinctive burnous.

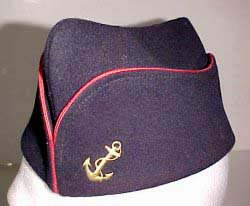
A "Traditional" garrison cap (calot) of the Troupes de marine

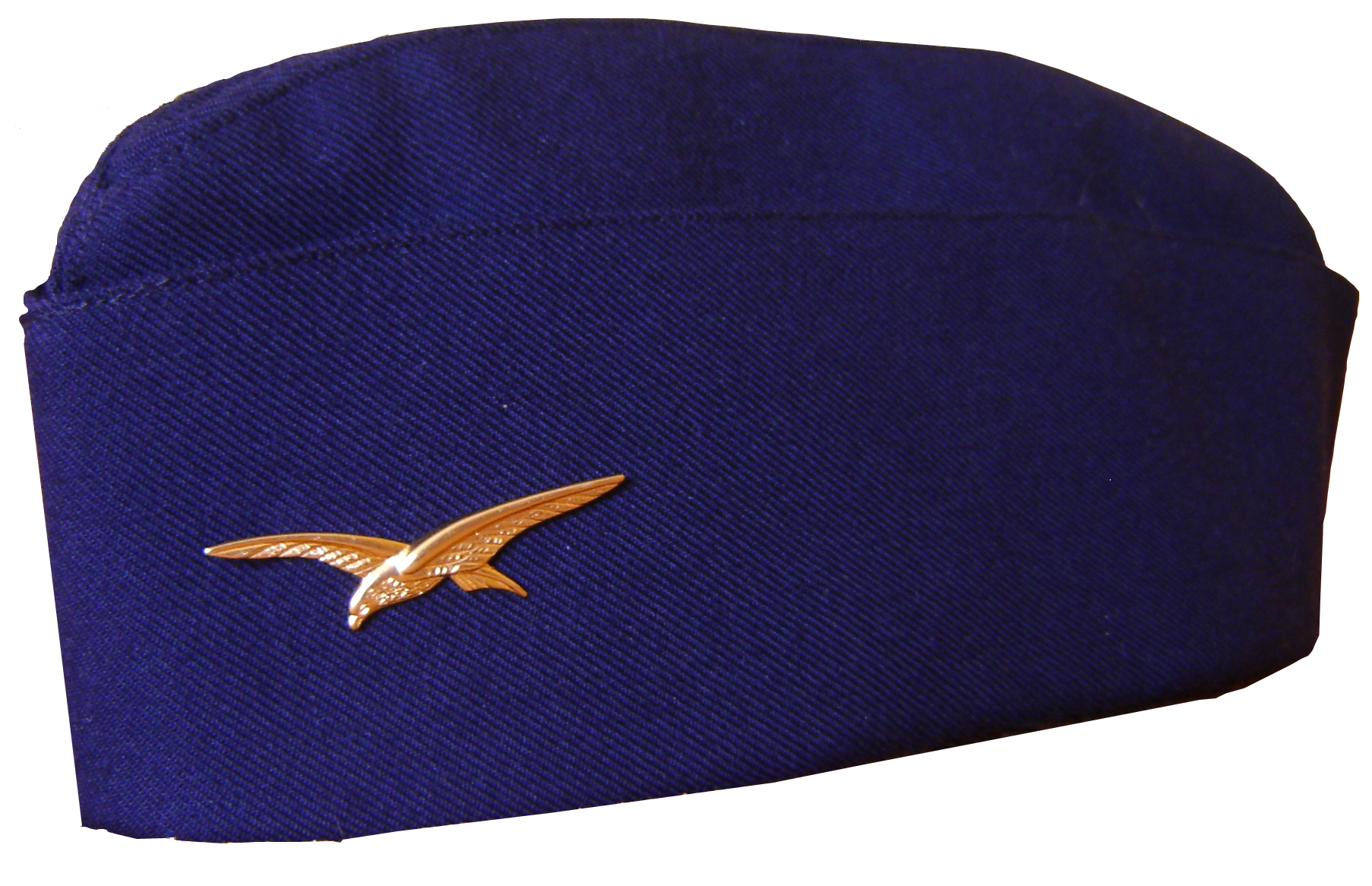
An example from the French Air and Space Force.

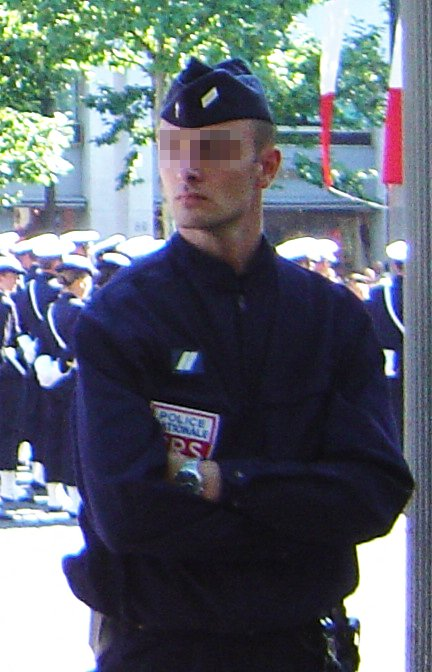
A CRS police officer in normal gear, including a bonnet de police.

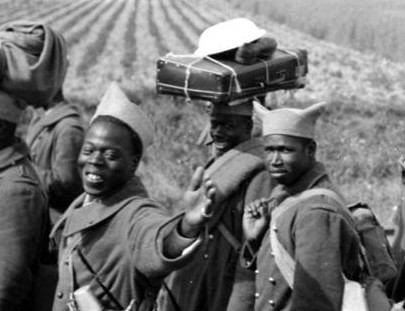
Standard and innovative use by French POW in 1940

== Italy ==
In the Italian language, the side cap is called bustina. It was adopted by the Royal Italian Army in the 1920s, and by the 1930s it was the main cap used by personnel belonging to the Royal Italian Army, the Regia Aeronautica (air force) and the Blackshirts. It remained in use until well after World War II.

The side cap is currently used by the Italian Air Force (Aeronautica Militare) as part of the uniform, except for the armed personnel of the Support and Defense branch, who use the more commonly worn beret in grey-cyan color. The side cap has three variants in the ITAF based on the rank of the wearer. While the typical dark blue color is shared across all three variants, the piping of the officer ranks is colored in gold yellow, the one for the NCOs (marshals) is dotted gold/blue and the volunteer’s is the same as the cap.

== Norway ==
In Norwegian, the side cap is known as båtlue, literally 'boat cap', and is used by the Royal Norwegian Air Force. The Royal Guards use a distinct variety commonly known as gardelue which is worn in garrison and while on leave.

== Portugal ==
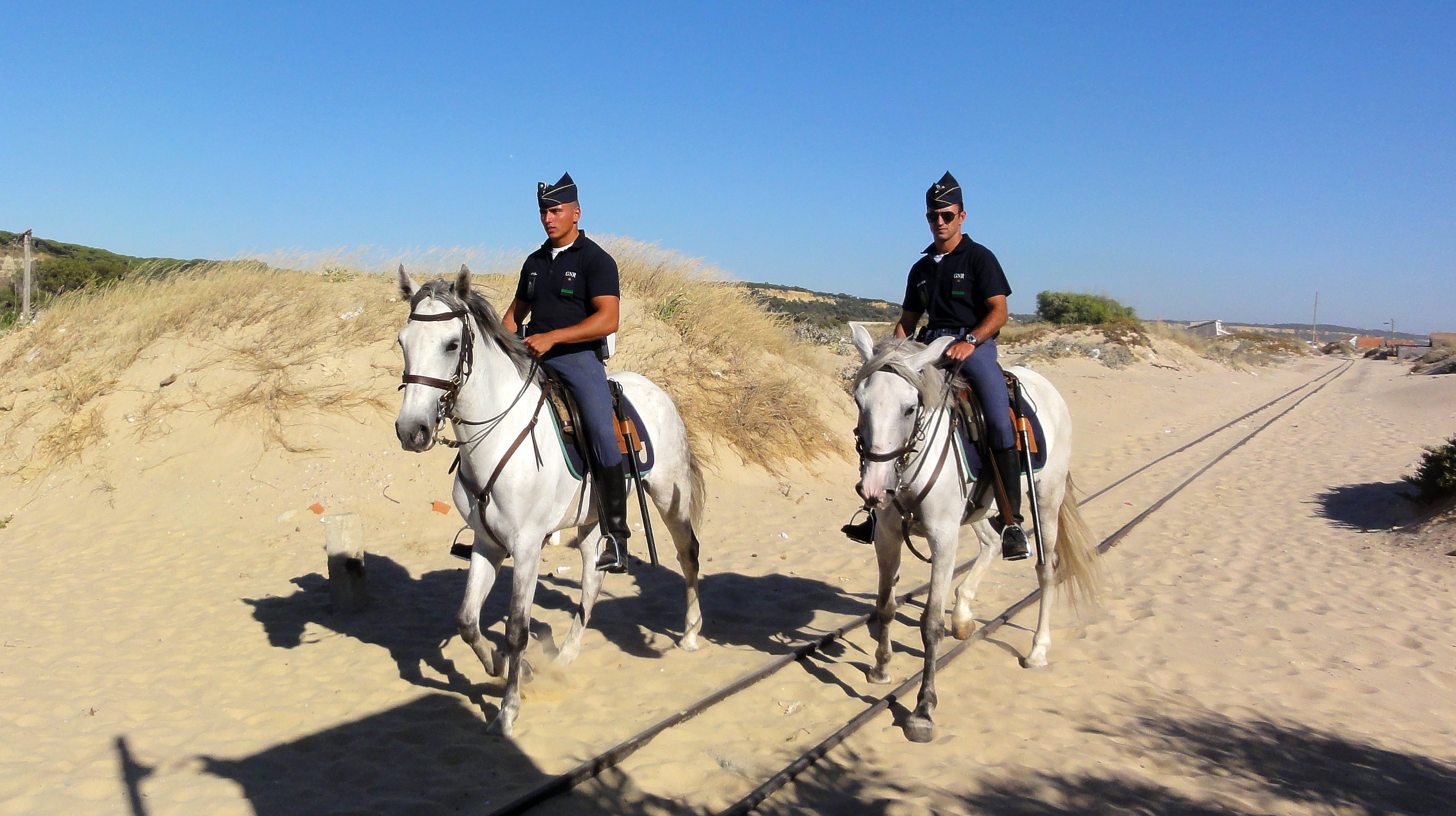
Members of GNR wearing typical pointed bivaques, while patrolling a Portuguese beach on horse.

In Portuguese service, the side cap is known as barrete de bivaque (bivouac cap) and often referred simply as bivaque.

Two basic models are in use by the armed forces, the security forces and the fire services of Portugal.

The first model has a curved top line and is used by the Portuguese Air Force (all personnel, except members of Air Police), the Portuguese Navy (officers and sergeants), the Public Security Police (all personnel, except members of special units) and the fire services.

The second model is a pointed cap and is used by the Portuguese Army (only personnel in training) and by the National Republican Guard (GNR).

== Russia/Soviet Union ==
In the USSR, the garrison cap was known as pilotka (пилотка, from "pilot"—the original cap was a part of the air force pilots' uniform in World War I). It was the most common type of cap used by the Red Army since December 1935 and until the 1980s. The pilotka was worn during the summer season instead of the winter ushanka. It continues to be worn in modern Russia, although more in the Air Force and the Navy, especially among submarine personnel, where its compactness is inherently practical. In the Ground Forces the pilotka has been more or less displaced by the patrol cap and the beret as an undress headgear, although it remains in the regulations. Navy tropical uniform also features the peculiar visored pilotka, to protect its wearers from the sun. The garrison cap was also the standard dress headgear for women in all of the Russian armed services (except for those units authorised to wear berets, such as airborne troops and marines), until replaced in March 2017 by the world-standard female peaked cap.

Aeroflot flight attendants wear a scarlet-colored garrison cap with a gold Aeroflot winged sickle-and-hammer stitched in the center.

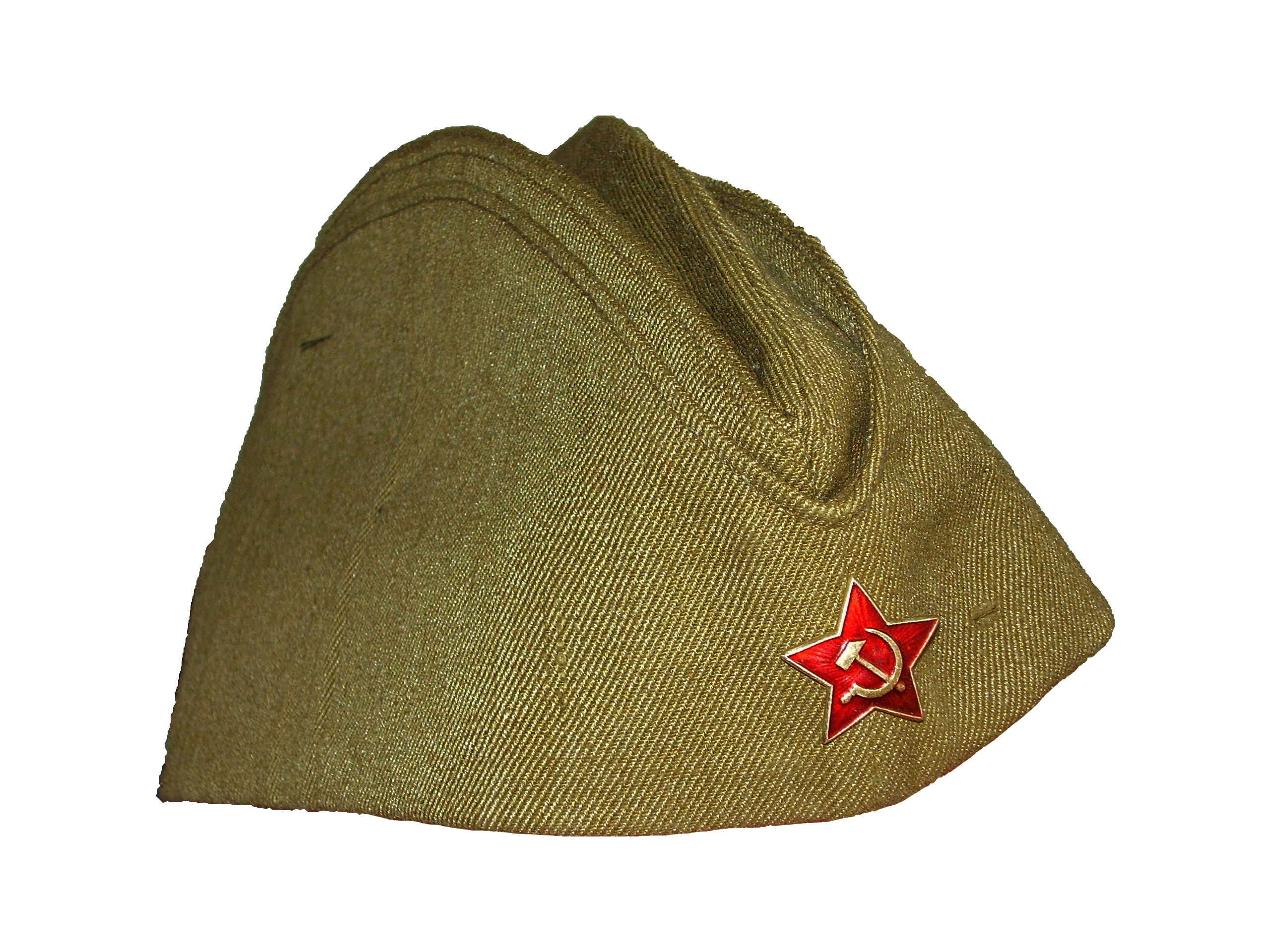
A pilotka of the Red Army.

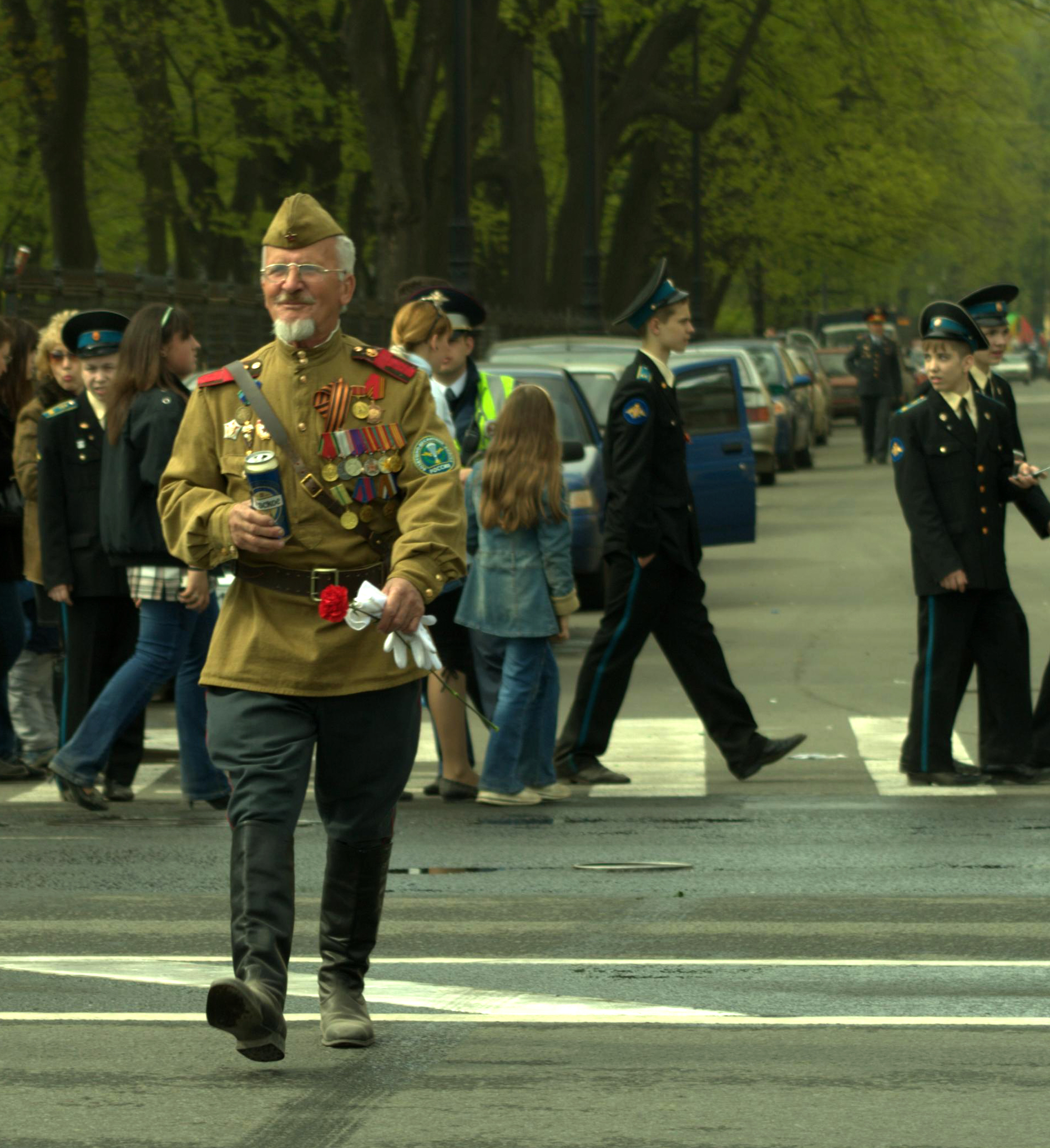
A man dressed as a veteran of the Great Patriotic War wearing both a gymnastyorka and a pilotka.

== Spain ==
A Chapiri of the Spanish Legion

The gorro de cuartel – referred to variously as gorrillo, gorra, chapiri or platano – was modelled on the later versions of the French bonnet de police and has the same vestigial tassel hanging from the front of the crown. The gorro de cuartel was originally known as the Isabellina; a large beret-like headdress which also included a tassel and was worn by the supporters of Queen Isabella II during the Carlist Wars of the mid-19th century.

It was in common use by both sides during the Spanish Civil War and continued in use by the Francoist forces after the war ended. It is now the distinguishing headgear of the Spanish Legion who wear it in barracks and on parade.

In 2024, the cap would be used by the National Police Corps (National Police) in its Cavalry unit to replace the Baseball cap and which uses it only on the service uniform of this unit.

== Sweden ==
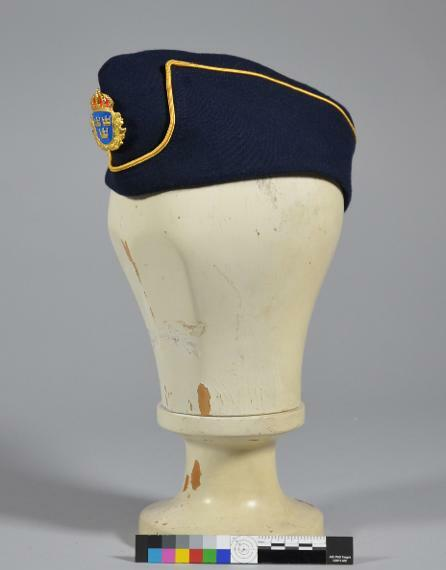
Side cap used by the Swedish Police.

In Sweden this style of headdress is known as a båtmössa (lit. 'boat cap'). It is mainly used by the Swedish Police Authority, Swedish Customs Service, Community Service Officers and also by Navy, Air Force and Army personnel, most recognizably by the infantry and cavalry units of the Life Guards.

== Turkey ==
In Turkey the cap is called kayık kep (lit. 'boat cap'). The Turkish Air Force personnel employ a navy-colored one, while the aviation units of the Turkish Naval Forces use a tan cap, and the Turkish Land Forces units use a green cap.

== United Kingdom ==
In the British Army, the first cap to be adopted of this style was the "Glengarry", which was authorised for all British infantry regiments in 1868 (although Scottish regiments had been wearing a round version since 1848 called a Kilmarnock or Humle bonnet, which had been folded to make a side cap). The Glengarry was replaced for officers of most non-Scottish units by a cap called the "torin" (similar in shape to the USSR's pilotka), which was worn from circa 1884 until 1896, when it too was replaced by a style for all ranks known as the "Austrian cap", which had a fold-down arrangement, giving the appearance when unfolded of a balaclava, thus warming the ears and back of the neck. The Austrian cap (officially known as the field service cap) was then replaced by an entirely different style of head dress in 1902 and so went into abeyance from general usage, although officers continued to wear them as a private purchase item of undress uniform. An all-khaki version was also selected in 1912 as a practical head dress by the fledgling Royal Flying Corps that went on to become the Royal Air Force (who continue to use the same type of cap).

In 1937, a khaki field service cap, described in an amendment to the Dress Regulations for the Army that year as "similar in shape to the Glengarry" was introduced as the "universal pattern field service cap", and saw extensive service during World War II as a head dress to be worn with Battledress when steel helmets were not required. At around the same time coloured versions were introduced for officers of both regular and territorial regiments, although these were an optional item and were produced in a range of colours for different regiments. In 1940 the War Office announced that such caps were to be part of the uniform of the LDV/Home Guard.

Since the universal introduction of the beret in 1947, the field service cap continued as an optional officer's accessory to be worn in barrack and mess dress (as an alternative to the peaked, khaki service-dress cap). They are still tailored in regimental colours. A more obscure type known as the "tent cap" is worn by officers of the Queen's Royal Hussars only and is unique in that it is not fitted with a badge, but identified instead by its regimental colouring. Its origins lie with one of their forebears, the 8th King's Royal Irish Hussars, who adopted the cap in the Second World War to reflect their long association with the Danish royal family, whose Royal Life Guards wear a similar design of cap with their undress uniform. This cap is in turn based on the French bonnet-de-police that was worn by hussars in the Napoleonic wars and after. The Torin style of cap is still worn by the Duke of Lancaster's Regiment and the Royal Dragoon Guards.

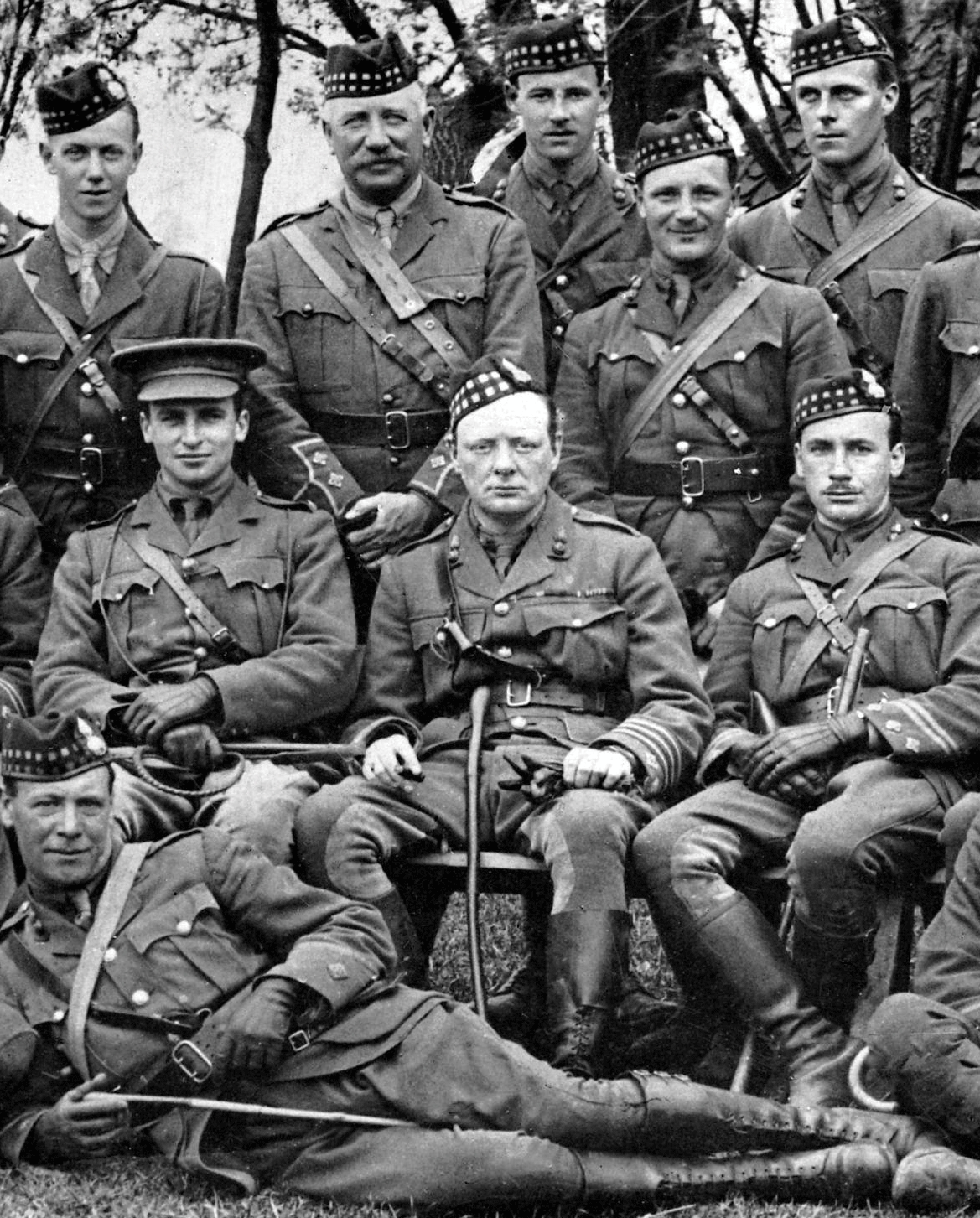
Officers of 6th Battalion, Royal Scots Fusiliers, in Glengarry side caps at Ploegsteert with Sir Winston Churchill in 1916.

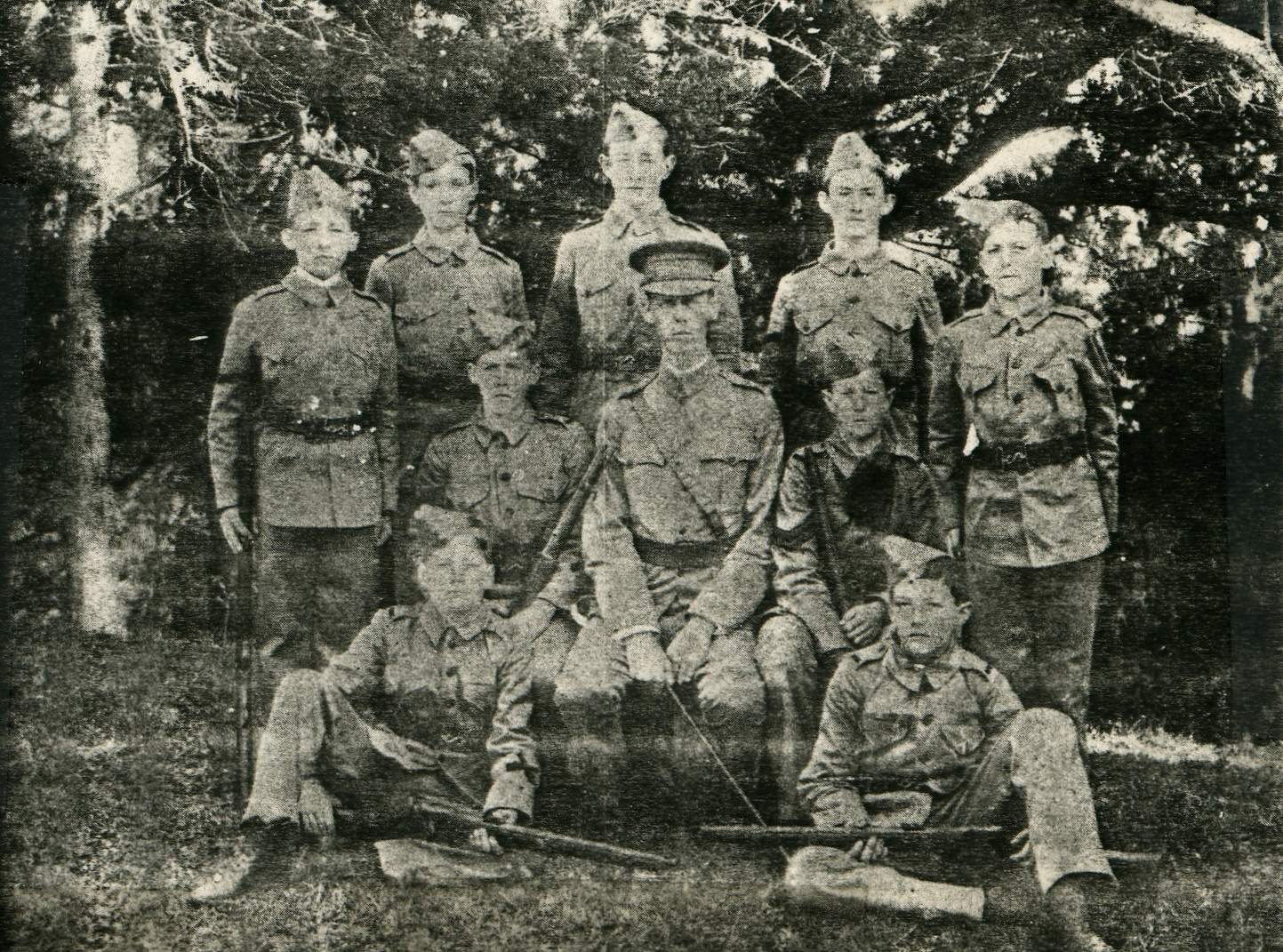
Saltus Grammar School Cadet Corps (later the Bermuda Cadet Corps) cadets wearing "Austrian caps", 1901

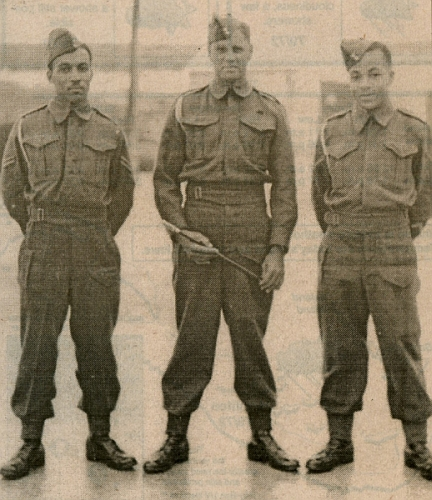
Warrant officer and NCOs of the Bermuda Militia Artillery with field service caps at St. David's Battery, ca. 1944.

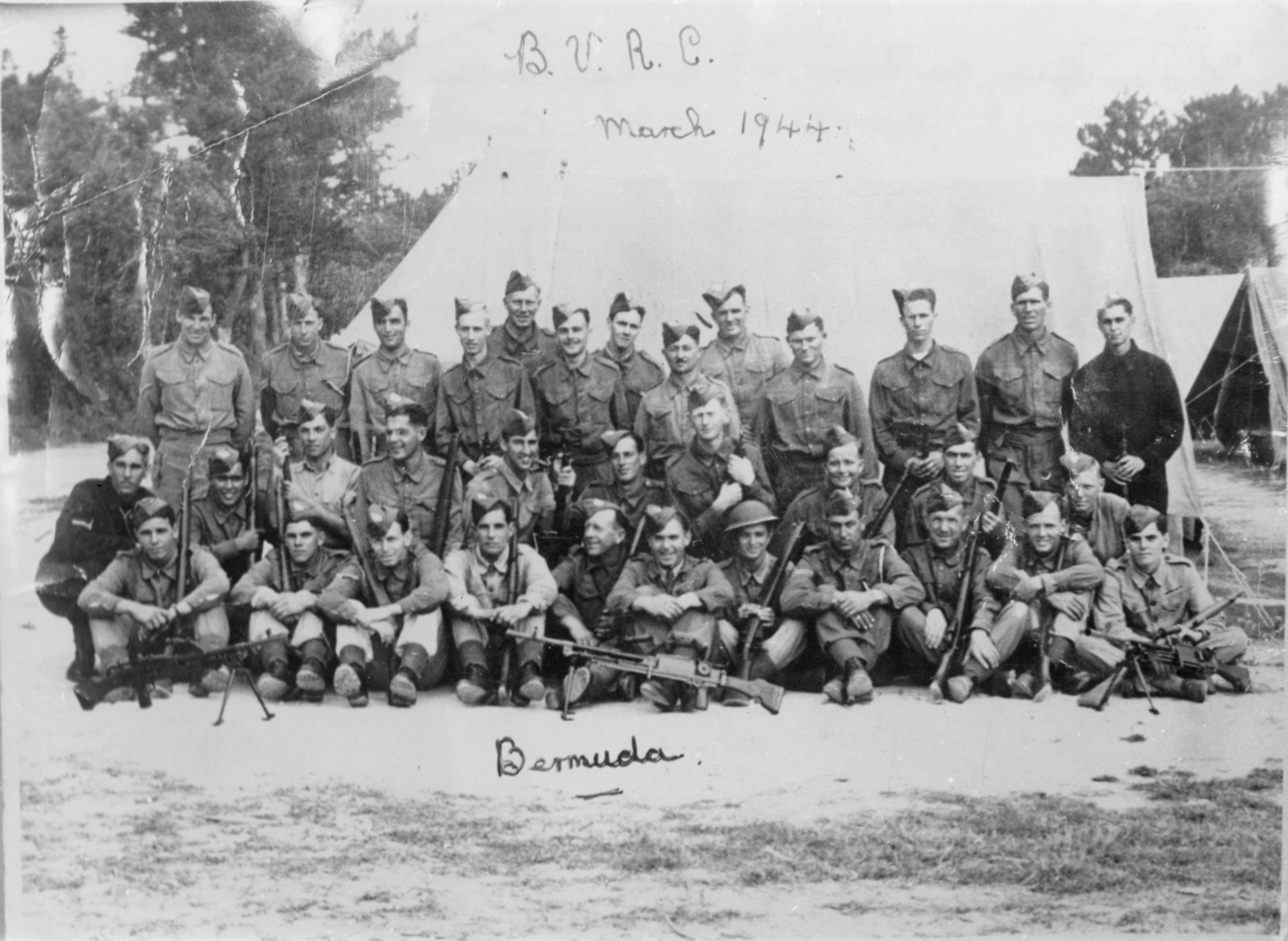
Bermuda Volunteer Rifle Corps soldiers wearing field service caps in March 1944

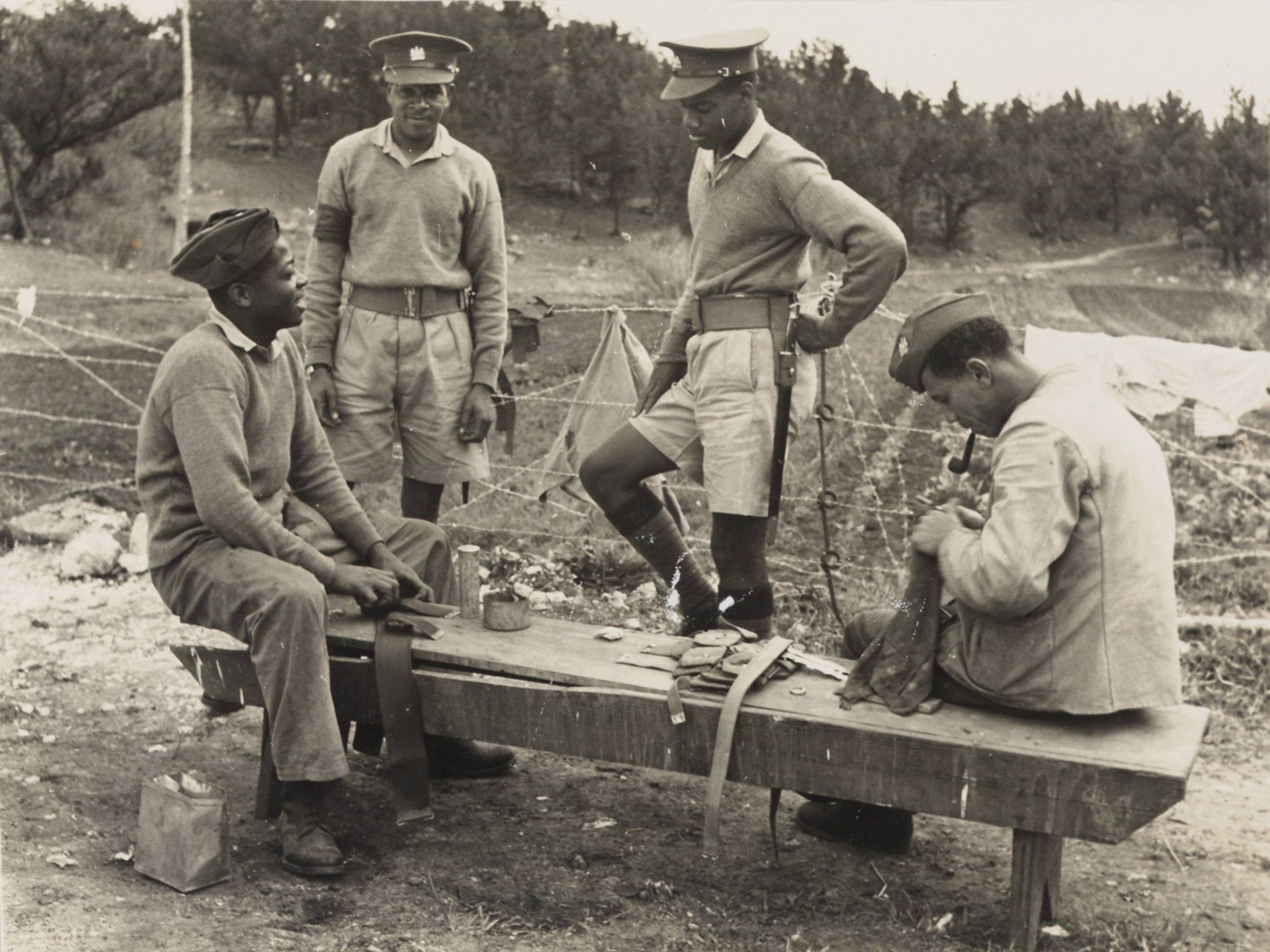
Bermuda Militia Infantry soldiers in camp, two with field service caps, circa 1940

=== Royal Air Force ===
In the Royal Air Force, a blue-grey field forage cap (sometimes called the 'chip bag hat') of an identical style remains widely worn with both working dress and flying suits.

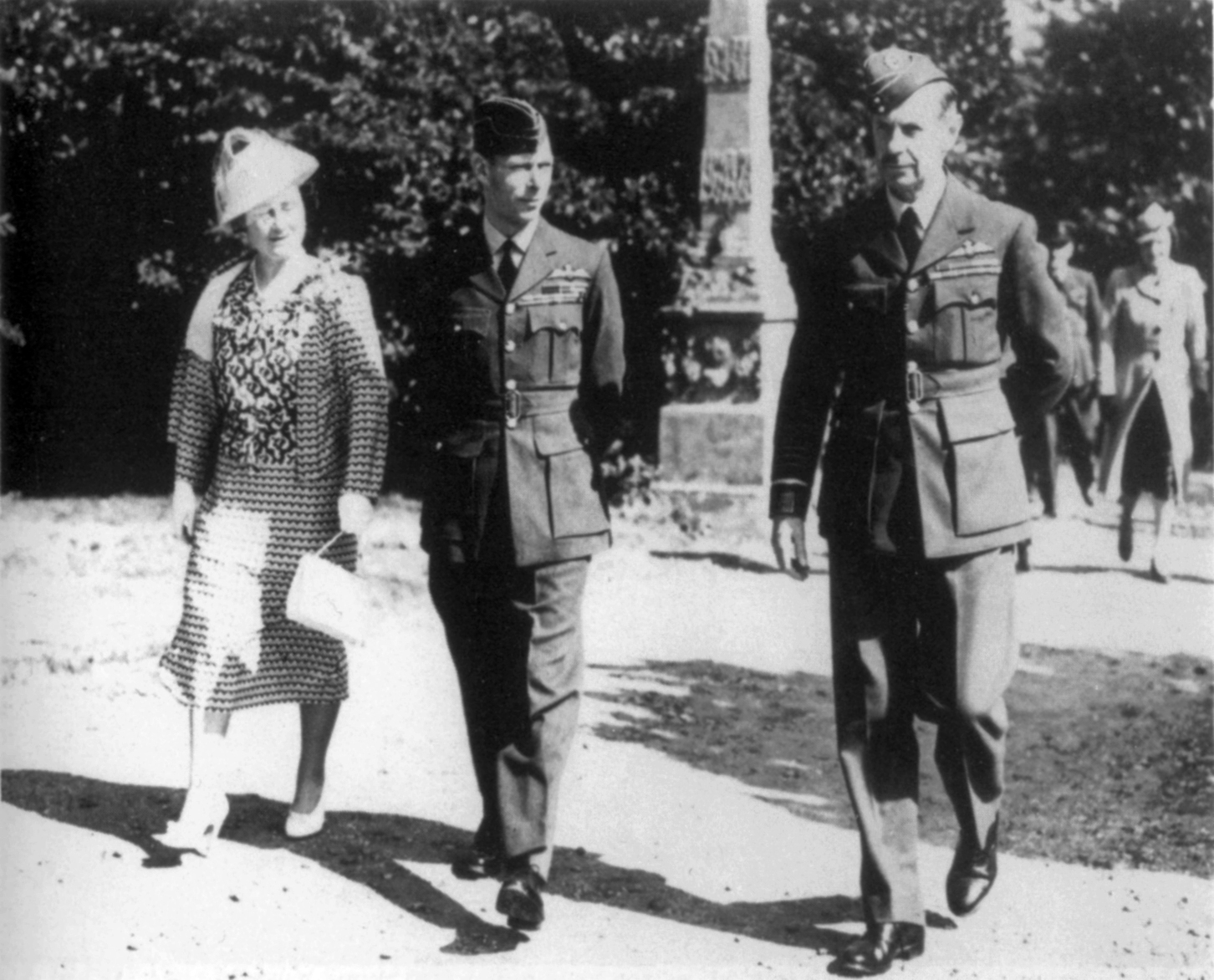
King George VI and Air Chief Marshal Hugh Dowding wearing the RAF field service cap in 1940

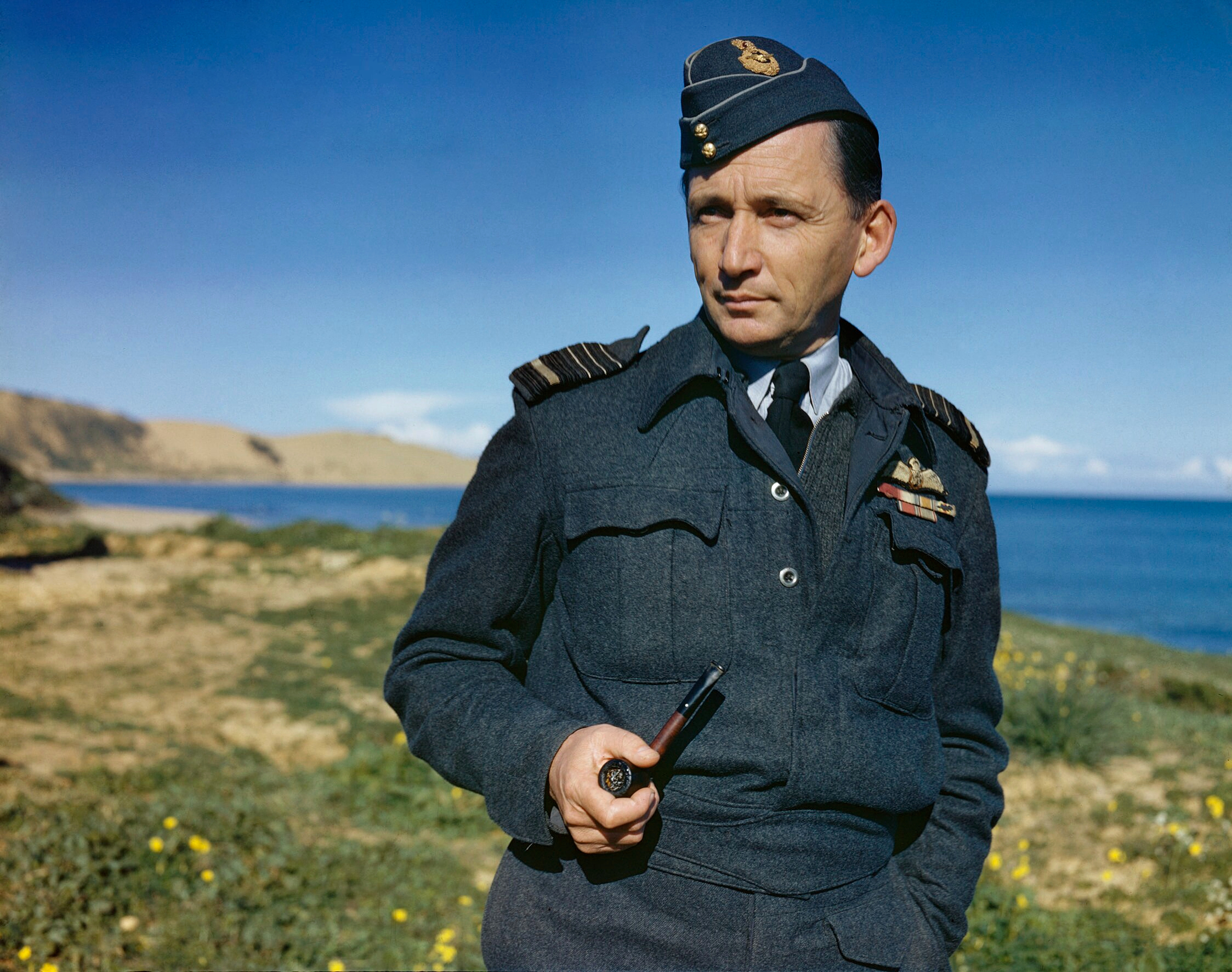
Air Chief Marshal Arthur Tedder wearing a forage cap with war service dress in 1943

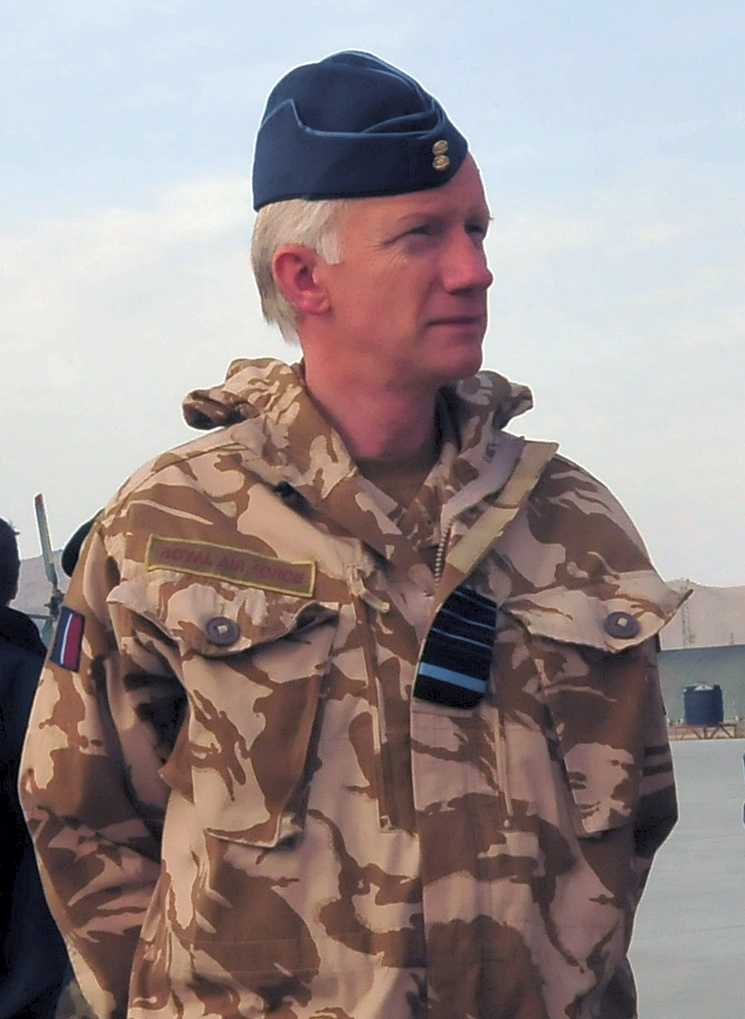
Air Chief Marshal Sir Stephen Dalton wearing a forage cap with desert DPM in 2010

== United States ==
In the U.S. Armed Forces it is known as a garrison cap, campaign cap (not to be confused with campaign hat, a distinct form of headgear), flight cap, garrison hat, fore-and-aft cap, envelope cap, or overseas cap.

=== U.S. Army ===
History of the overseas cap in the US Army from the perspective of the 82nd Airborne Division ("All Americans") (2017)

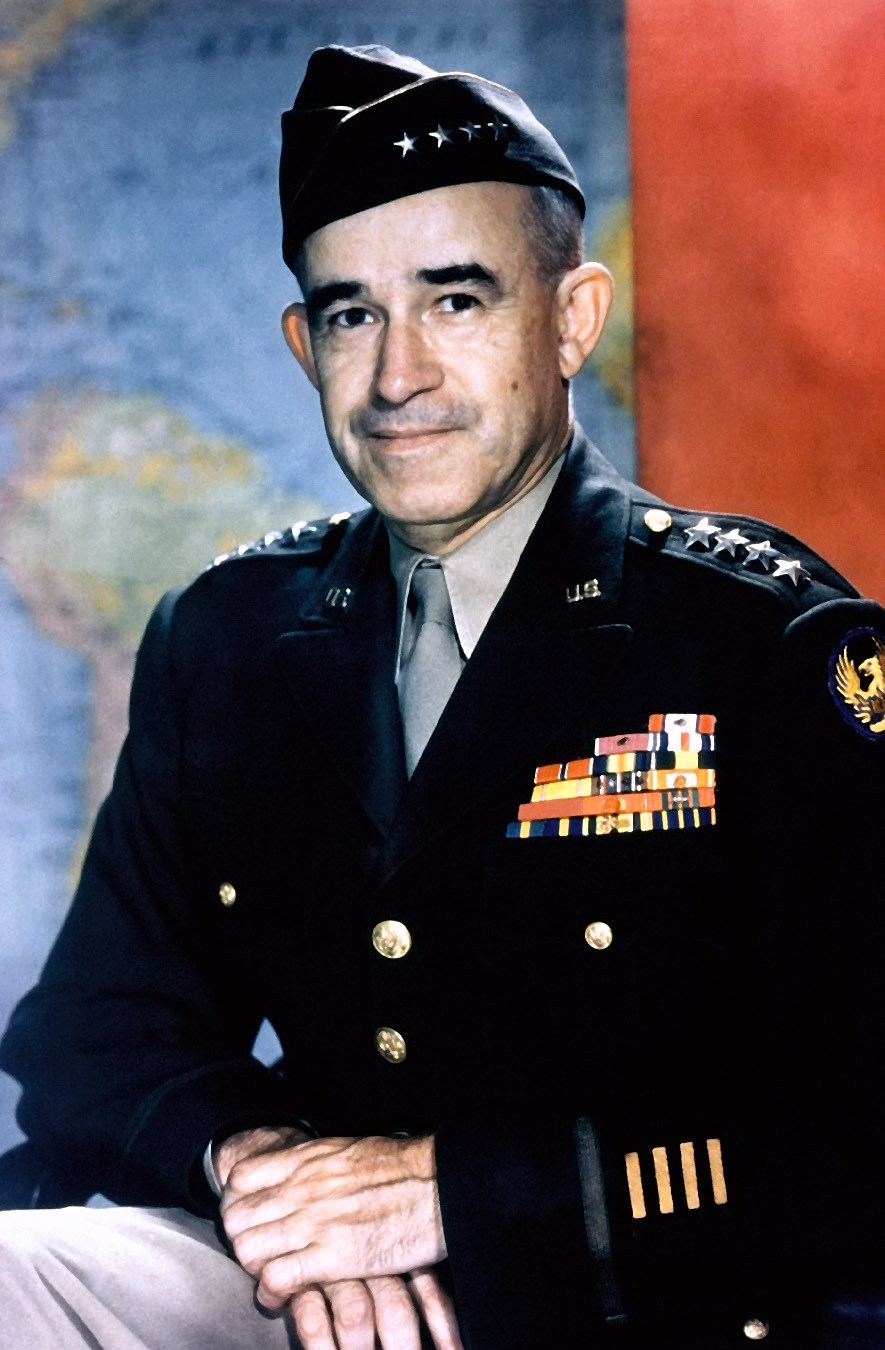
General Omar Bradley wearing his garrison cap with the Army's "pinks and greens" uniform, circa 1949

When first issued to U.S. "doughboys" in World War I, the hat was called the overseas cap as it was only worn by troops in France who were given the French type forage cap, as they did not have their wide-brimmed campaign hats with them. The overseas cap could be stored easily when the helmet was being worn. A blue overseas cap was adopted post-war by the American Legion, but the hat largely disappeared from the Army between the wars, with the exception of the Army Air Corps (who called it the "flight cap") where it was authorized in August 1933 and armored units. However it returned in 1939 with a finalized specification as of February 1941. The hat was widely issued from then on as "the garrison cap." With the replacement of the service cap and campaign hat, the garrison cap was given branch of service color piping, as had earlier been the case with the cord of the campaign hat (light blue for infantry, red for artillery, yellow for cavalry, etc.). This practice was discontinued when individuals had to purchase a new hat if they were transferred to a different branch of the service. Officers' piping was similarly carried over from campaign hat cords and continues: warrant officers' caps are piped in silver and black, commissioned officers' caps are piped in gold and black, and general officers' caps are piped in gold.

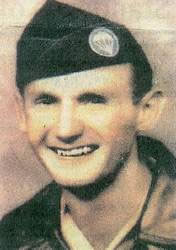
SGT Ray Eubanks with the 503rd PIR wearing the Airborne (Parachute) Insignia on his garrison cap (c. 1944)

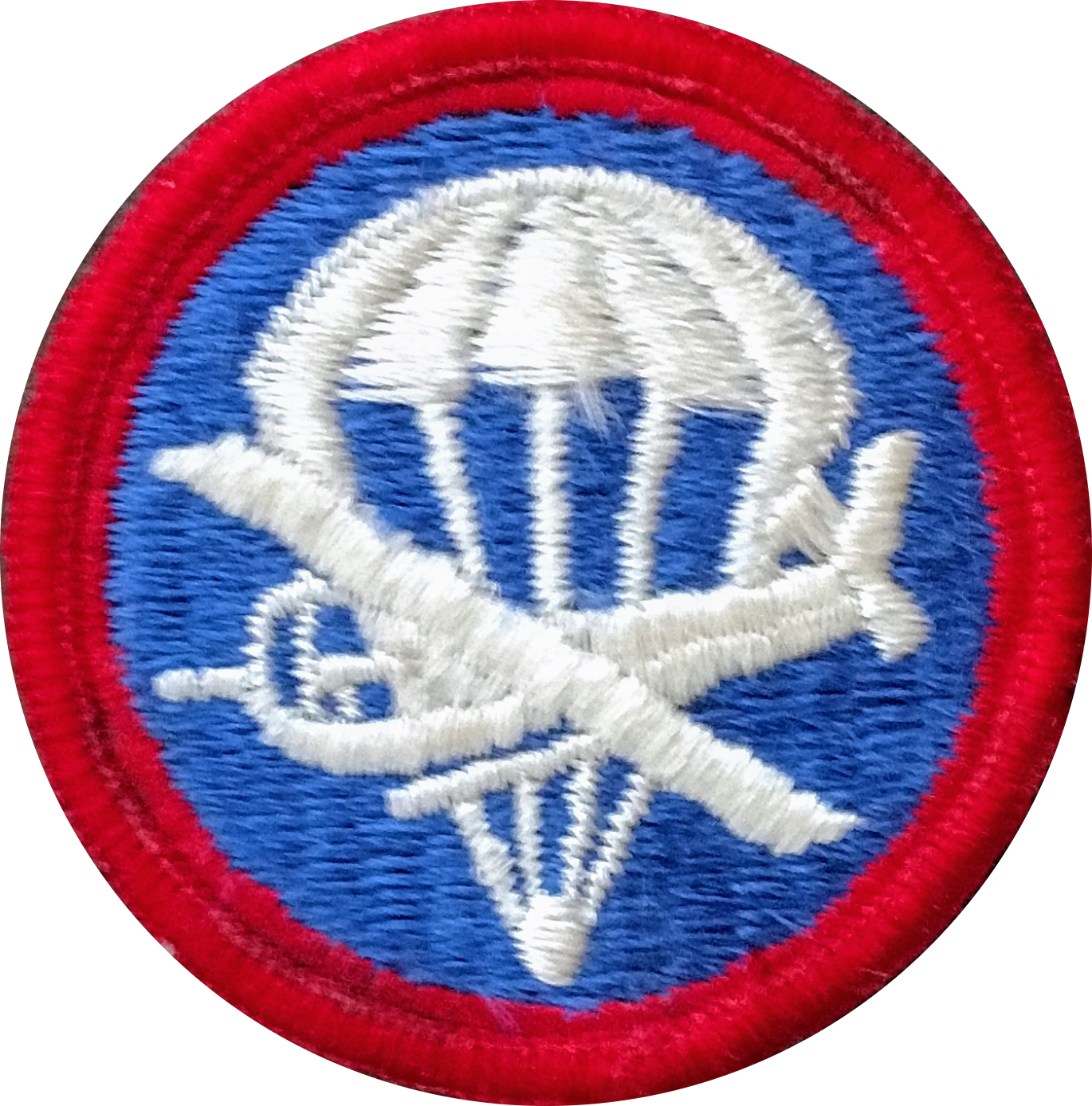
Later version of the Airborne Insignia (enlisted variant), which combined the Airborne (Parachute) and Airborne (Glider) Insignias into one

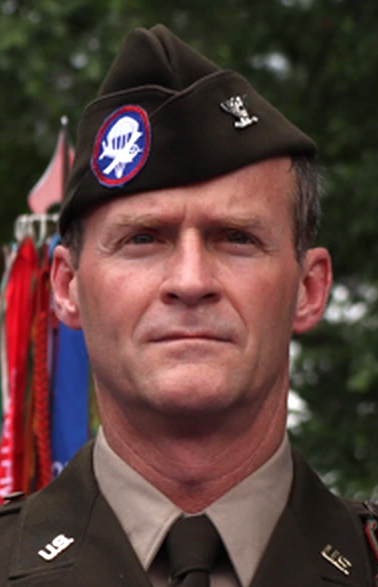
Airborne Insignia reintroduction with new Army Service Uniform garrison cap (2021)

Additionally, starting in World War II military parachutists and glider-born forces wore an Airborne Insignia on their garrison cap—enlisted wore them on the left while officers wore them on the right. Different variants of the Airborne Insignia were worn until later in World War II when parachute and glider formations combined their unit–specific insignia into one red, white, and blue, parachute and glider Airborne Insignia. The Airborne Insignia continued to be authorized for wear on the garrison cap by those assigned to airborne units until the garrison cap was replaced with the U.S. Army's black beret.

Until May 2004, it was also part of the initial uniform issue for soldiers who received their green "Class A" Army Service Uniform before becoming military occupation specialty-qualified, and thus allowed to wear the standard black beret. That green service uniform was discontinued in October 2015.

In 2020, the US Army introduced a new green service uniform based on the WWII-era "pinks and greens" officers' uniform, which reintroduced the garrison cap to the Army.

=== U.S. Marine Corps ===
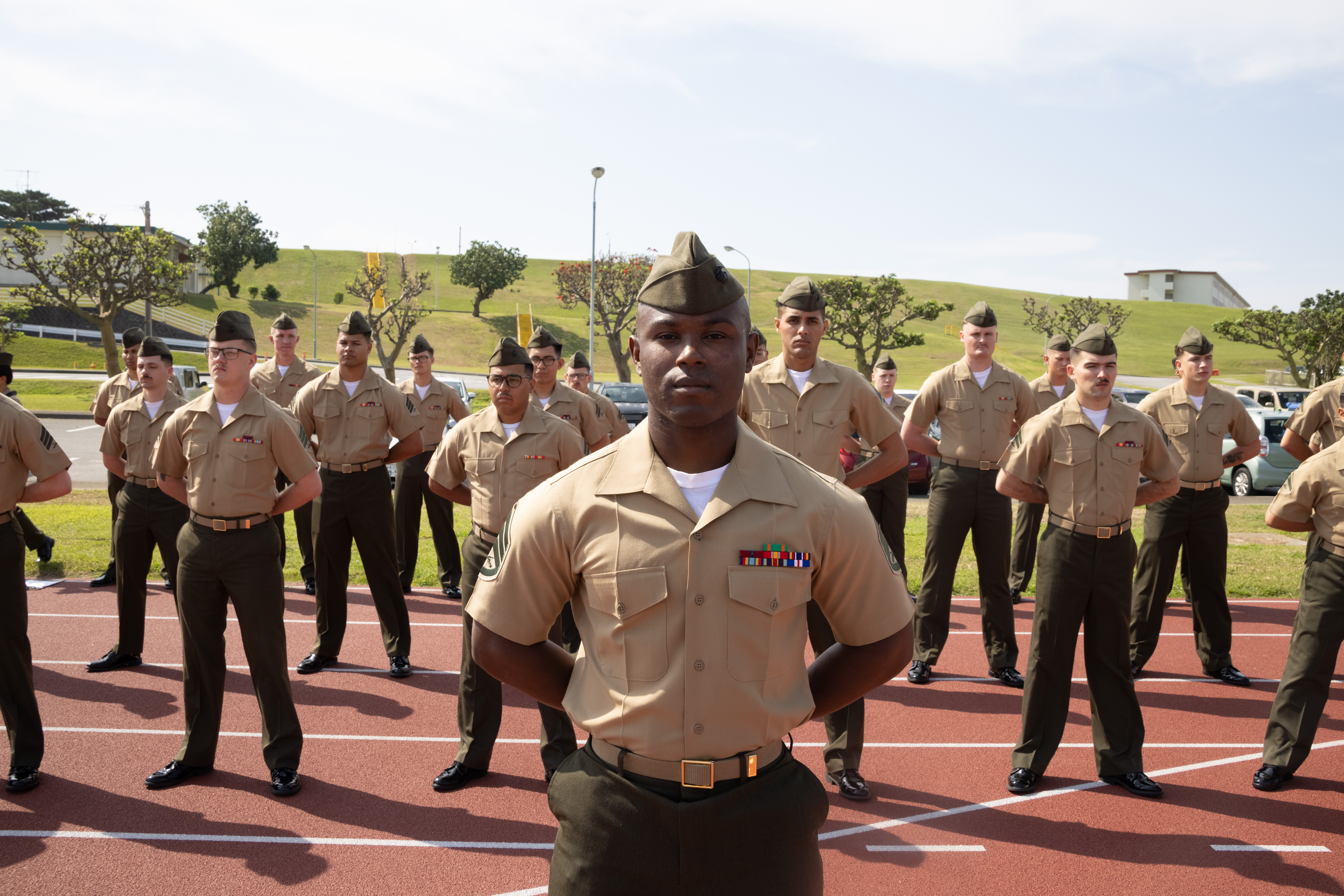
A US Marine wearing the Marine Corps garrison cap

The overseas cap ("cover") was first issued to Marines in France in early 1918. Originally Marine officers wore red piping and Marine generals wore gold piping with all ranks wearing the Eagle, Globe, and Anchor insignia on the wearer's left side. The cover was made in both forest green wool and khaki cotton.

Usage continues to be common in the U.S. Marine Corps as the most common headgear when wearing service uniforms (the other option being the bulkier frame-type "barracks cover"). In addition, it is the standard headgear for Marine aviators, flight officers, and enlisted aircrew wearing flight suits. The Marine officer's garrison cap, unlike those of the Army or Air Force, does not have metallic piping; the only items distinguishing it from the enlisted cap is the placement of small officer's rank insignia on the right side of the cap and the style of the Eagle, Globe and Anchor insignia on the left.

=== U.S. Navy ===
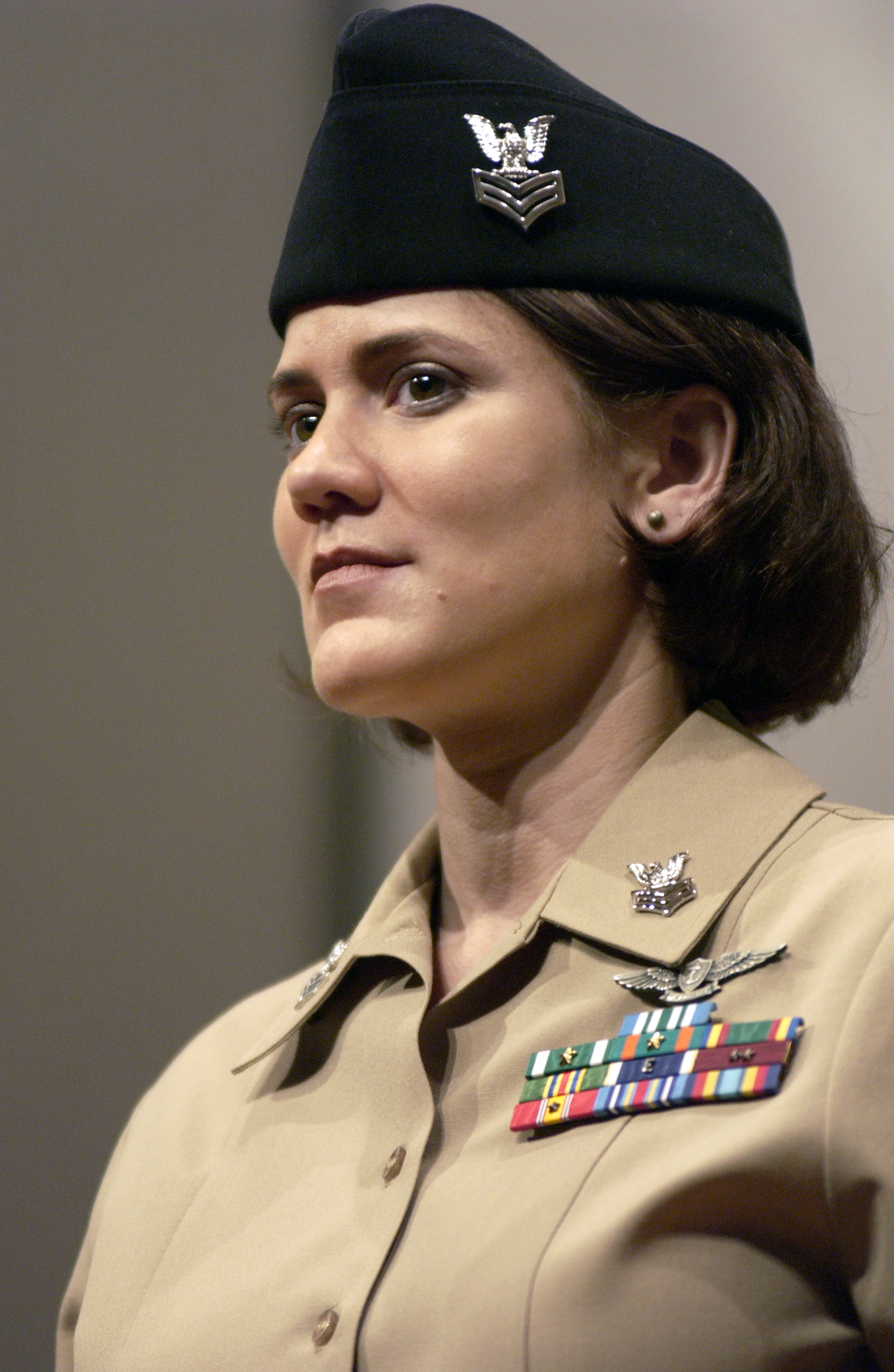
A U.S. Navy Petty Officer First Class wearing the enlisted service uniform with garrison cap

In the United States Navy the garrison cap ("cover") was first authorized during World War II, originally for aviators and later for all officers and chief petty officers (CPOs). Blue and white versions, as well as a forest green version for aviation officers and CPOs were later developed, although the blue and white versions were discontinued after the war. Today, garrison caps in khaki are almost always worn with service khakis and flight suits. Officers wear a miniature version of the officer crest on the left and small rank insignia on the right side of the cap, while CPOs will wear a CPO, SCPO or MCPO fouled anchor on the left as appropriate. Like the Marine Corps, and in contrast to their Army and Air Force counterparts, the Navy caps for officers also avoid the use of metallic piping. The blue version garrison cap, essentially black, was resurrected in the mid-1990s for wear with the blue working uniforms. Enlisted personnel since 2008 have been issued a black garrison cap for wear with the new Navy Service Uniform. It has since been authorized for the officer and CPO Service Dress Blue uniforms. The garrison cap is also worn by midshipmen and officer candidates.

=== U.S. Coast Guard ===
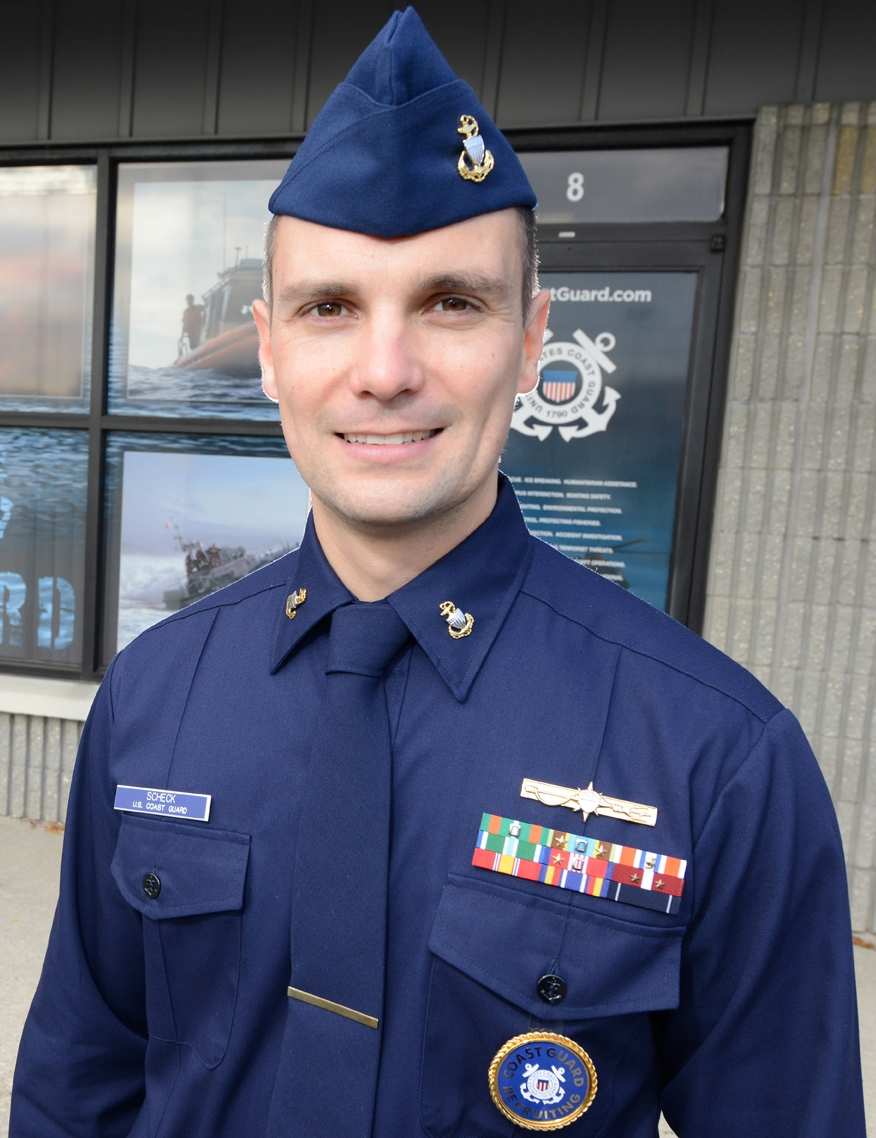
U.S. Coast Guard garrison cap, as worn by a chief petty officer with the winter dress blue uniform

The U.S. Coast Guard issues the garrison cap ("cover") to all service members. The cap is serge and is authorized with Tropical Blue, the Winter Dress Blue, and Service Dress Blue uniform. Regulations for the placement of insignia are similar those of the U.S. Navy and Marine Corps. Unlike the Navy, enlisted members in the rates E-1 through E-3 wear a miniature version of the enlisted combination cap device. Like the Navy and Marine Corps, and in contrast to their Army and Air Force counterparts, the Coast Guard garrison caps for officers also avoid the use of metallic piping.

=== U.S. Air Force ===
US Air Force enlisted flight caps, note the different styles between female and male variants

A blue flight cap is the most common headgear worn with the U.S. Air Force's service dress or "blues" uniform. The color of the piping varies: solid blue for enlisted, blue and silver metallic braid for company-grade officers and field grade officers, and solid silver metallic for general officers. Officers wear large metal rank insignia affixed to the left front of the cap in a manner similar to that historically used by the Army with their garrison caps. No other accoutrements are worn. The flight cap is also worn by members of the Civil Air Patrol in a manner appropriate to their rank. The company-grade officer version is also worn by United States Air Force Academy and Air Force ROTC cadets as well as officer trainees at officer training school. Cadets in the Junior ROTC and Civil Air Patrol cadet programs wear the enlisted version of the flight cap.

== Serbia/Yugoslavia ==
In Serbian, the side cap is known as šajkača and was introduced to Serbian soldiers in 1870. It was an integral part of the uniform of Serbian soldiers in the Serbian–Turkish Wars (1876–1878), the Serbo-Bulgarian War (1885) and the Liberation Wars (1912–1918). It was used as the official cap of soldiers in the Yugoslav Army and Gendarmerie in the Kingdom of Yugoslavia. During the German-Italian occupation of Yugoslavia in the Second World War it was worn by numerous armed formations. Two distinct side caps were prominent among Yugoslav Partisans: the titovka, based on the Soviet pilotka, and the triglavka, based on the side caps worn by Yugoslav volunteers in the Spanish Civil War and the wider Republican faction. After the war in the new Socialist Federal Republic of Yugoslavia, the titovka became the official cap of the Yugoslav People's Army.

Since 2020 the Serbian Air Force and Air Defence has used the side cap as standard attire for its pilots.

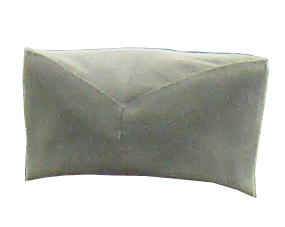
Serbian šajkača sidecap

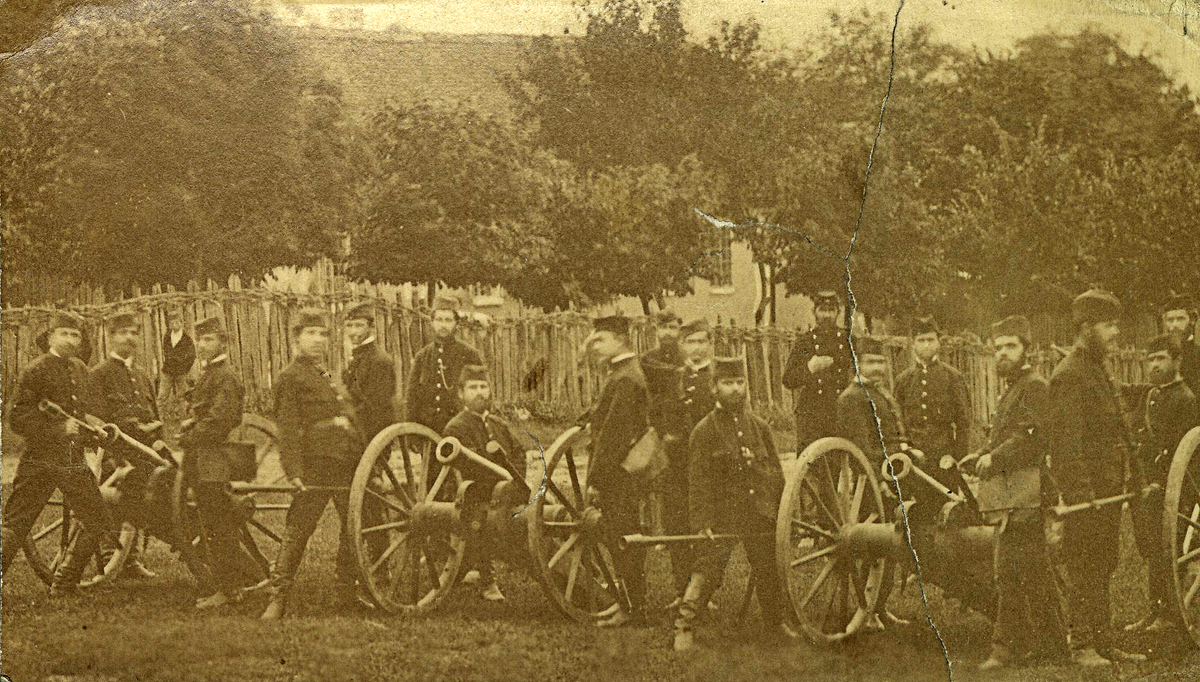
Serbian soldiers wearing šajkača caps in the Serbian–Turkish Wars of 1876–1878.

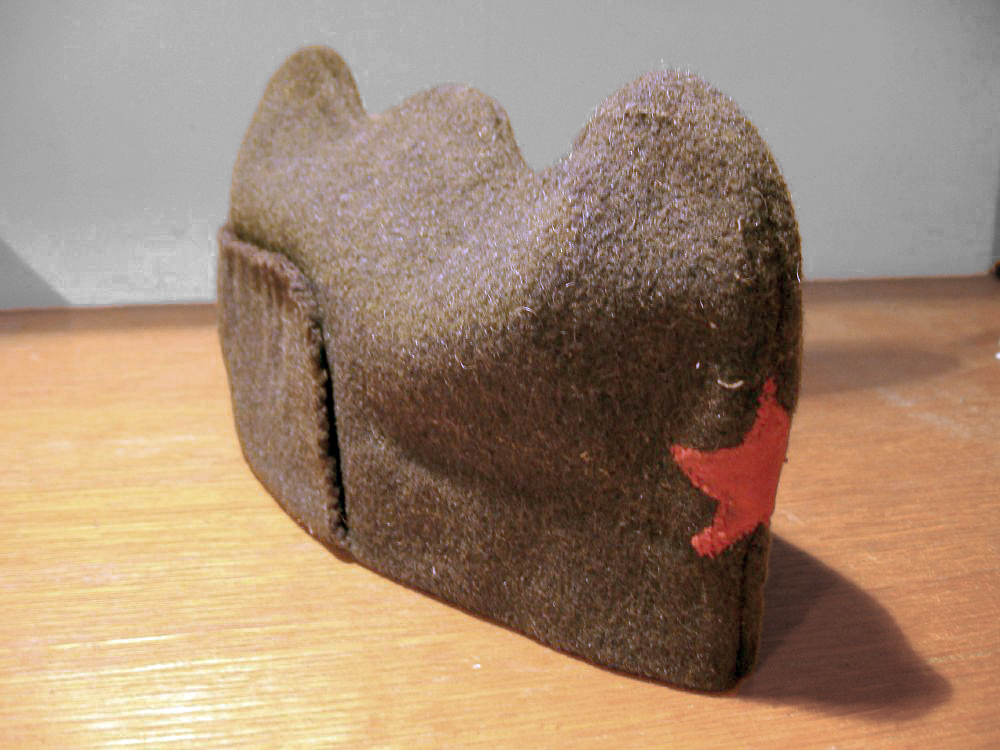
A Triglavka cap.

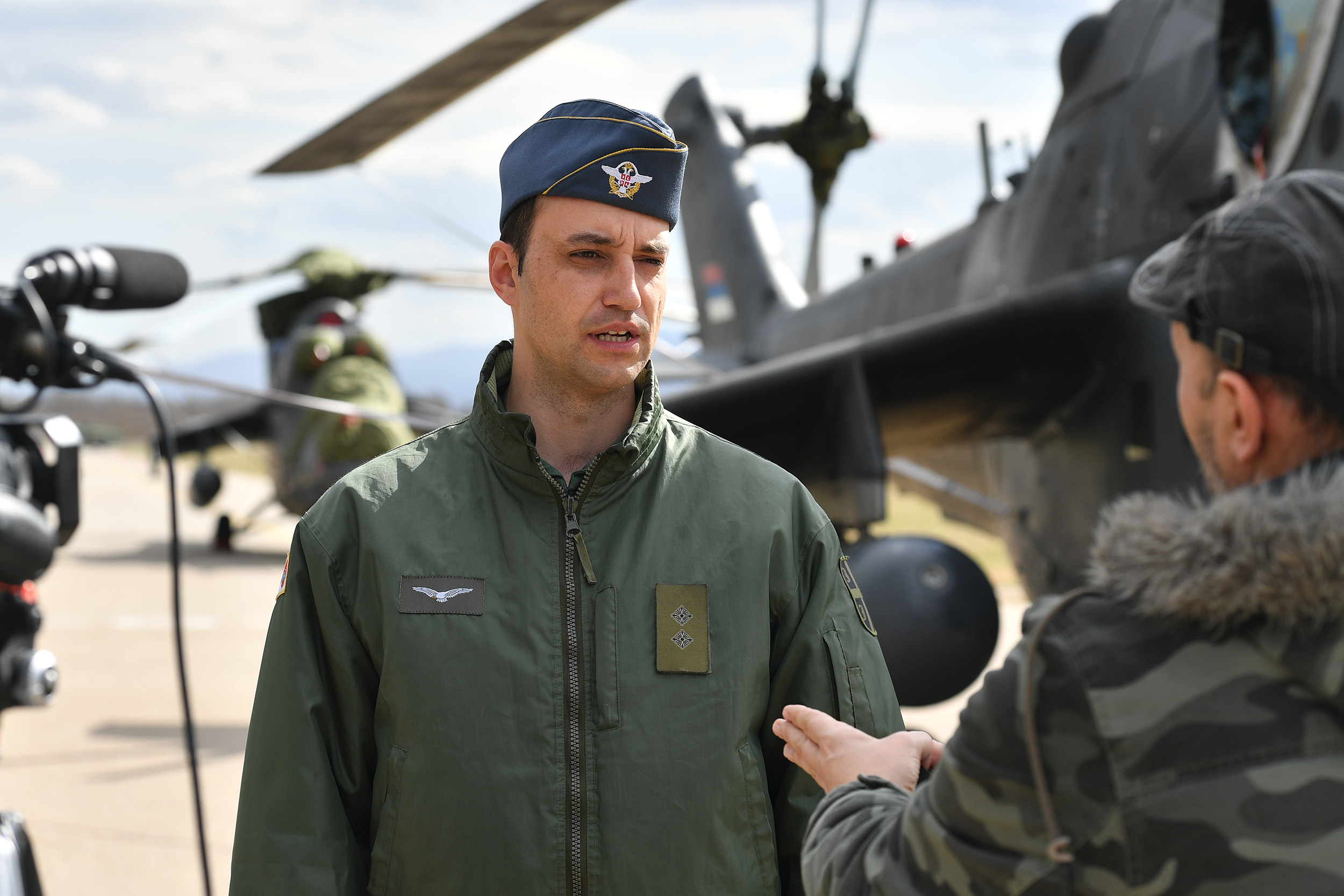
A Serbian Air Force and Air Defence officer wearing a side cap.

== Civil use ==
Officers and Instructors of the Australian Air Force Cadets are also entitled to wear a garrison cap with service dress uniform.

Royal Canadian Air Cadets wear wedge caps in Air Force blue as part of their uniform.

United States Civil Air Patrol personnel wear the US Air Force flight cap with distinctive CAP hat insignia. Senior members (ages 18 and above) will wear the company grade/field grade officer or general officer style flight cap, dependent on CAP rank, but will wear a small version of the service hat device in lieu of rank insignia in order to distinguish themselves from actual Air Force officers (e.g., those in the active duty regular Air Force, the Air Force Reserve and the Air National Guard). CAP Cadet officers will wear the Air Force enlisted flight cap with cadet rank insignia instead of the CAP insignia, while cadets who are not cadet officers will wear a generic insignia. This hat is the standard cover with most of the Air Force style uniforms.

Many uniformed civilian organizations such as the Boy Scouts of America (which no longer uses them) have used garrison caps.

Waiters at many old fashioned style diners also wear garrison caps.

The American Legion and many other veterans service organizations wear distinctive garrison caps.

Some commercial air-line employees, particularly flight attendants, wear garrison caps.

Participants of U.S. military ROTC and JROTC programs are issued garrison caps for the duration of their studies.

The Massachusetts Maritime Academy and State University of New York Maritime College also require their cadets to wear garrison covers.

New York City Police Department trainees in the Corps of Cadets and the Police Academy also wear garrison covers.

Members of the Union Drum Corps wear garrison caps during their performances.

The Boys' Brigade have garrison caps as part of their uniform.

The Scouts Association of Malaysia have forage caps for ceremonial turnout.

The Police of Poland officers also wear a side cap as part of their service uniform, with the Polish eagle emblem on the front, used with regular duty and training uniforms.

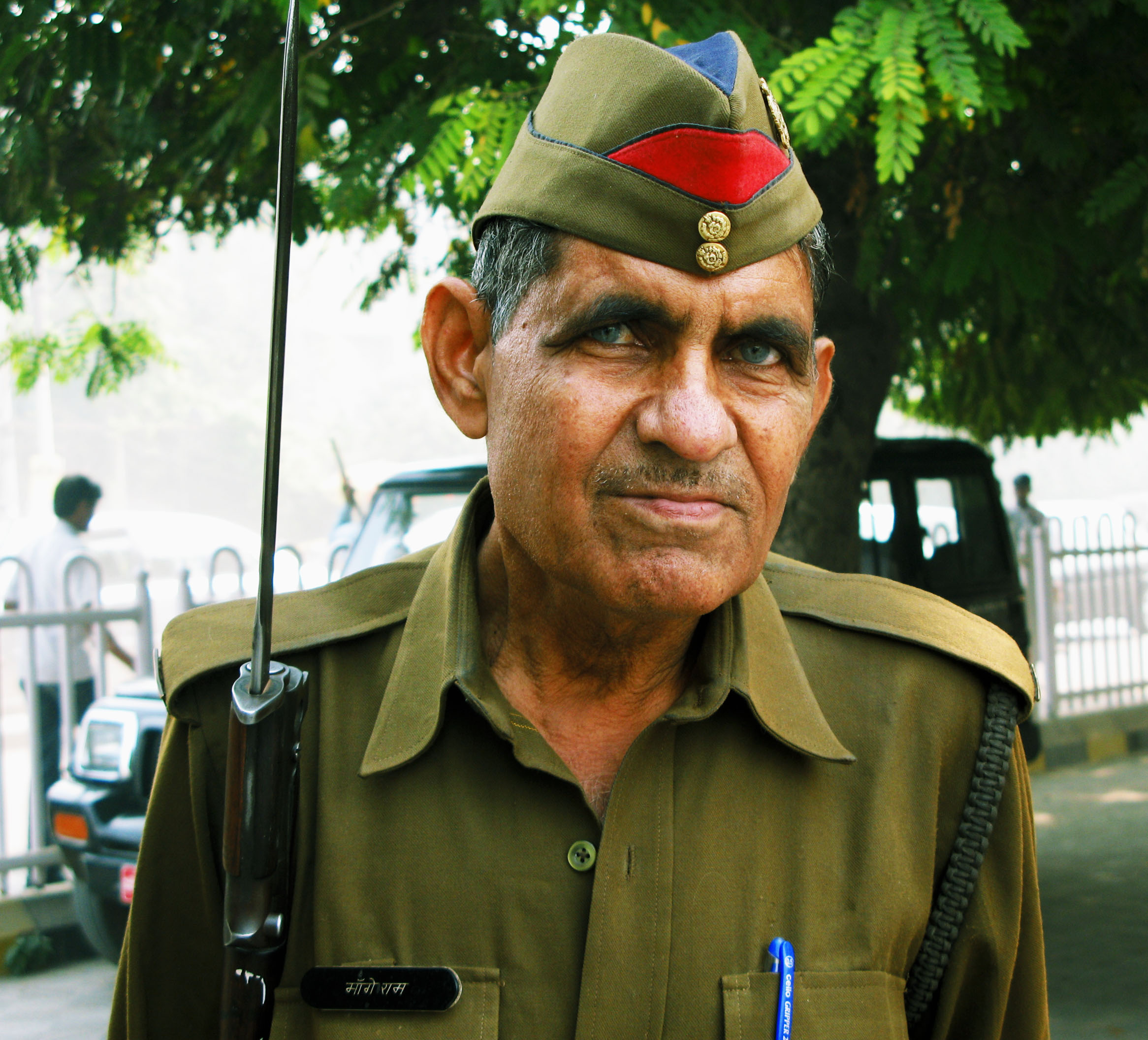
A constable of the Uttar Pradesh Police in India in forage cap

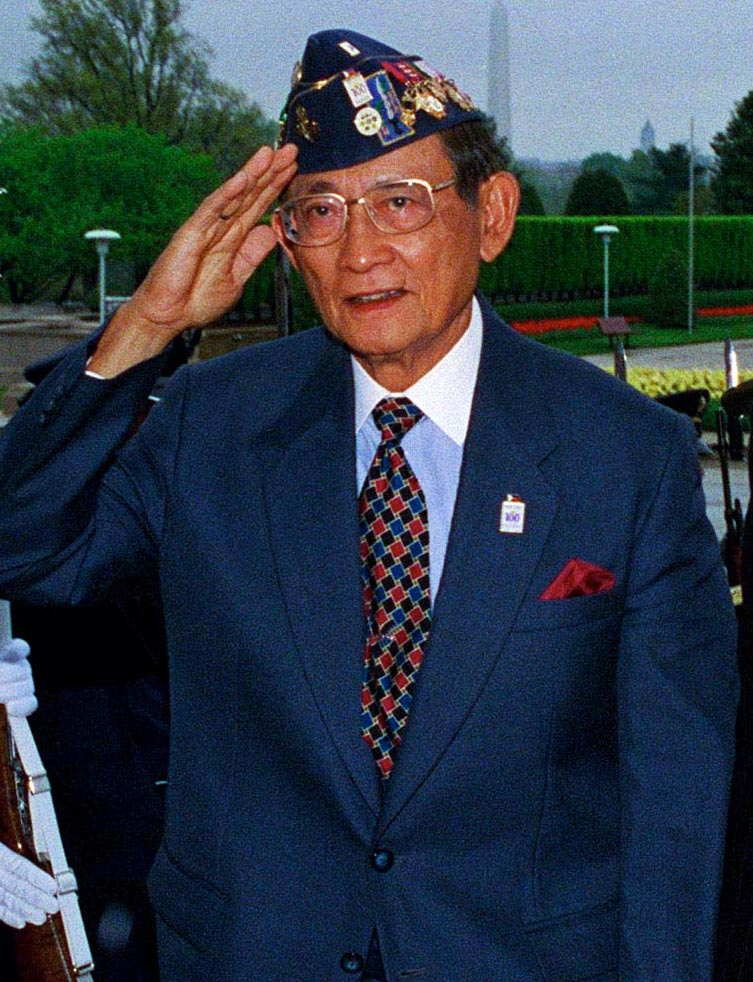
Philippine President Fidel V. Ramos wearing a side cap during his visit to the Pentagon in 1998

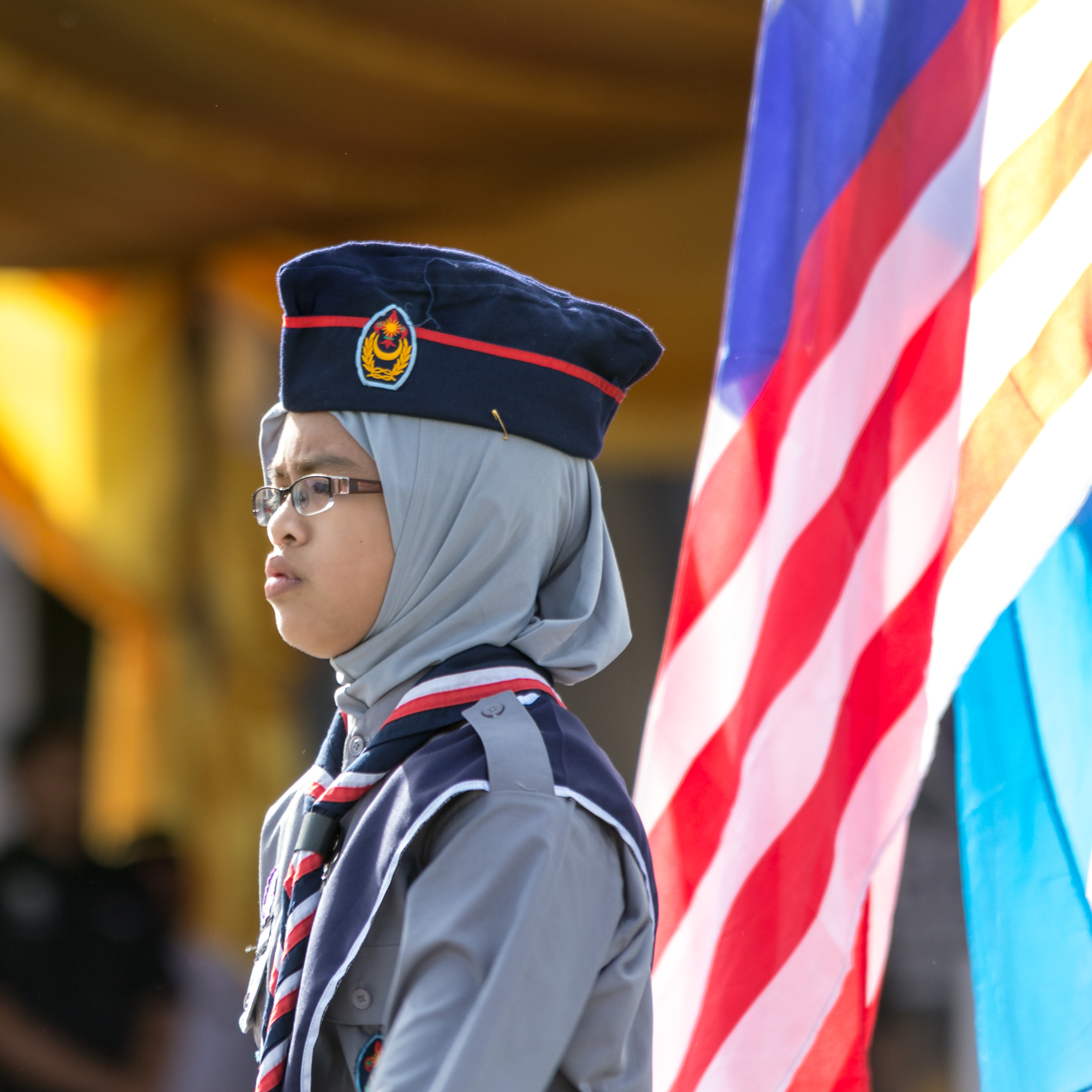
A Malaysian Girl Scout wearing a forage cap at the parade during the celebrations of Hari Merdeka 2013.

== See also ==
- List of hat styles
- Boonie hat
- Forage cap
- Gandhi cap—A similar cap worn in South Asia
- Kepi
- Patrol cap
- Peaked cap
- Pileus (hat)
- Utility cover
- Headgear of the United States Army
