= 1st-2nd Chasseur Regiment =

Former tank regiment of the French Army

1er-2e Régiment de chasseurs
- Active: 1998 -
- Country: France
- Branch: French Army
- Type: Armoured Cavalry
- Role: Armoured
- Part of: 7th Armoured Brigade
- Garrison/HQ: Quartier Maginot, Thierville-sur-Meuse
- Mottos: Tous ensemble. En avant! (together, forward)
- Equipment: Leclerc MBT

Commanders
- Current commander: Colonel Renaud de l'Estoile

The 1st-2nd Chasseurs Regiment (French: 1er-2e Régiment de chasseurs, 1er-2e RCh) was an armoured cavalry (tank) unit of the French Army. It was the armoured component of the 7th Armoured Brigade. Garrisoned at Quartier Maginot, Thierville-sur-Meuse near Verdun, France.

== History ==
The Chief of Staff of the French Army decided on 1 September 1990 to create a new experimental armoured regiment of 80 tanks with two squadron groups (Groupes d'Escadrons, GE). Each group would consist of three combat squadrons and one command and logistics squadron.

The 1er-2e RCh was formed in 1998 by merging the 1st Chasseur Regiment (French: 1e Régiment de chasseurs) and 2nd Chasseur Regiment (French: 2e Régiment de chasseurs) as two squadron groups. The regiment was disbanded with the deactivation of the 2nd Chasseur Regiment. The 1st Chasseur Regiment continues in existence.

The regiment carried out operations in Lebanon, Kosovo, Bosnia, Afghanistan, Ivory Coast, Senegal and New Caledonia.

== Organization ==
The regiment was composed of around 1200 personnel organization into 13 squadrons.

- EAS - Administration and Support Squadron
- 1st Squadrons Group (x40 MBTs)
  - ECL - Command and Logistics Squadron
  - 1e Esq - 1st Squadron
  - 2e Esq - 2nd Squadron
  - 3e Esq - 3rd Squadron
- 2nd Squadrons Group (x40 MBTs)
  - ECL - Command and Logistics Squadron
  - 1e Esq - 1st Squadron
  - 2e Esq - 2nd Squadron
  - 3e Esq - 3rd Squadron
- EEI - Reconnaissance Squadron
- EMR - Regimental Maintenance Squadron
- 5e Esq (UIR) - 5th Squadron (Reserve response unit)
- 6e Esq (UIR) - 6th Squadron (Reserve response unit)

== Commanding officers ==
- Colonel Le Jariel des Châtelets (1995–1997)
- Colonel Bertrand Binnenjdick (1997–1999)
- Colonel Hervé Faivre d'Arcier (1999–2001)
- Colonel Manuel Salazar (2001–2003)
- Colonel Luc Beaussant (2003–2005)
- Colonel Jean-dominique Dulière (2005–2007)
- Colonel Nicolas Casanova (2007–2009)
