= 1st Tirailleur Regiment =

French armoured unit

- 1er régiment de tirailleurs
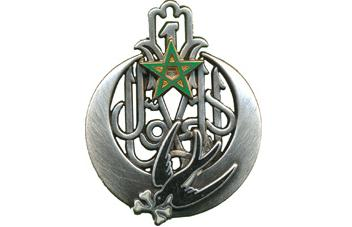
- Insignia of the 1st Tirailleur Regiment
- Active: 1 May 1994 – present
- Country: France
- Branch: French Army
- Type: Tirailleur regiment
- Role: light infantry
- Part of: 7th Armoured Brigade
- Garrison/HQ: Épinal
- Mottos: Le Premier, toujours le premier ("The First, always the first")
- Mascot: Ram
- Equipment: Véhicule blindé de combat d'infanterie
- Battles and Wars: World War I World War II; Indochina War; Algerian War; Siege of Sevastopol (1854–1855); Battle of Turbigo; Battle of the Somme; Battle of Verdun
- Decorations: Légion d'honneur Croix de guerre 1914-1918; Gold Medal of the City of Milan

Insignia
- Regimental banner

The 1st Tirailleur Regiment (French: 1^{er} régiment de tirailleurs, 1^{er} RTir) is a mechanized infantry unit of the French Army, created in 1994 under the command of the 7th Armoured Brigade. It is mainly composed of active soldiers but also reservists, deployed both overseas and in internal security tasks such as Operation Vigipirate. It is currently the only tirailleur regiment in the French army.

== History ==
It was formed on 1 May 1994 from the 170th Infantry Regiment. The ceremony was held in Golbey, in the presence of the heirs of the Army of Africa, legionnaires, Spahis, Zouaves and the 170th Infantry Regiment, who kept the flag of the 7th Algerian Tirailleurs Regiment, became the 1^{er} Régiment de Tirailleurs. It is officially recreated under the command of Colonel Jean-Guy Gendras and in the presence of François Léotard, the French Minister of Defence. It was created in tribute to North African Tirailleurs who took part in all the battles of France on the occasion of the golden jubilee of the Liberation of France. The regiment formerly was stationed at the Haxo Golbey neighborhood and the neighborhood Varaigne in Epinal. Since 2005, the entire regiment has been grouped in Varaigne neighborhood abandoning Haxo.

== Traditions ==
=== Regimental Nouba ===
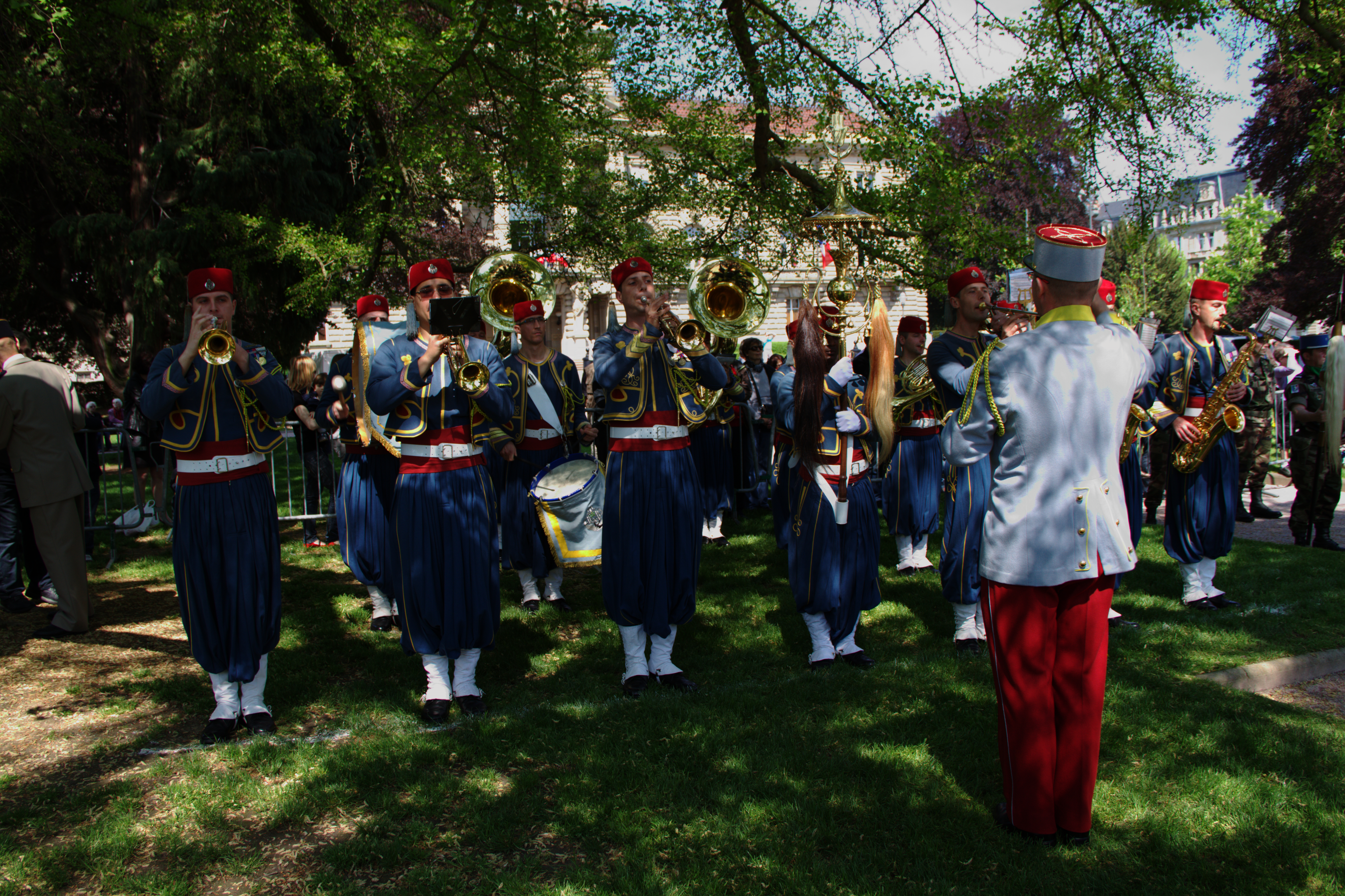
The band at a Victory in Europe Day ceremony in Strasbourg, 8 May 2013.

The regimental military band of the regiment is known as the "Nouba". The traditional uniform is generally derived from those in use in the 19th century. The earliest evidence of music in these African regiments dates back to the centenary of Algeria in 1860, and the painter Edouard Detaille in 1884 represented the nouba of the 2nd Infantry. The band, which is a small size ensemble, has had a Turkish crescent used for ceremonial duties since the end of the First World War.

=== Mascot ===
Around 1930, some regiments most often had a mascot, a bighorn sheep or a ram. The mascot of the 1st Regiment is called Messaoud, which in Arabic means "fortune".

=== Uniform ===
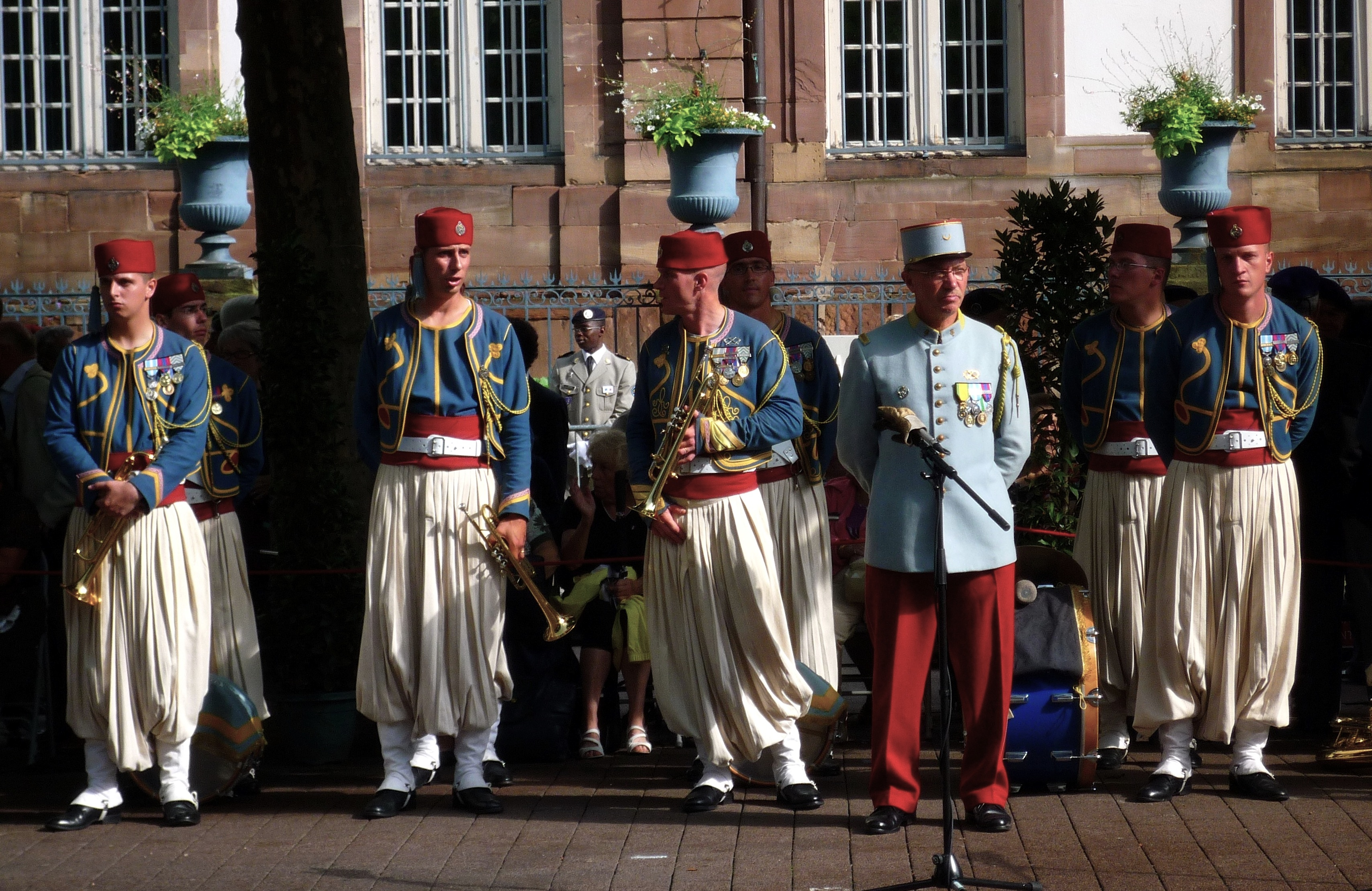
Soldiers of the 1st Tirailleur Regiment displaying late 19th- to early 20th-century uniforms for Bastille Day festivities in Strasbourg.

A characteristic of La Nouba is its oriental dress, which recalls the uniform of the old Algerian tirailleurs created around 1840. The origin of these troops goes back to the Arab and Turkish units formed by the French after the Invasion of Algiers in 1830, with volunteers, contingents provided by different local chiefs, or with organized troops from the various beys defeated by the French.

This uniform consists of baggy pants called "saroual", which sky blue or white depending on the season, tightened at the waist by a wide red woolen belt. Its function was to keep the abdomen of soldiers and non-commissioned officers warm to prevent them from suffering from intestinal ailments. The short, blue jacket, with yellow facings drawing beautiful scrolls, is worn over a sleeveless vest: the "sedria". On the head, the skirmishers wear the "chèche", that is to say a strip of white rolled up fabric, or the "chéchia" in crimson felt with a pompom with sky blue fringes. Only this regiment is authorized to wear the golden half-moon on a clear sky-blue background, crowned with three chevrons of the African arm.

== Commanders ==
- Colonel Jean-Guy Gendras (1993-1995)
- Colonel Éric de Fleurian (1995-1997)
- Colonel Jean-Jacques Poch (1997-1999)
- Lieutenant Colonel François-Xavier Yves (1999-2001)
- Colonel Bruno Dran (2001-2003)
- Colonel Thierry Lion (2003-2005)
- Colonel Pierre Esnault (2005-2007)
- Colonel Emmanuel Gaulin (2007-2009)
- Colonel Rémy Cadapeaud (2009-2011)
- Colonel Cédric du Gardin (2011-2013)
- Colonel Marc Espitalier (2013-2015)
- Colonel Franck Boudet (2015-2017)
- Colonel Cyril Leprêtre (2017-2010)
- Colonel Jean-Baptiste Vouilloux (2019-2021)

== See also ==
- Senegalese Tirailleurs
- Structure of the French Army
