= Thierville-sur-Meuse =

- Commune
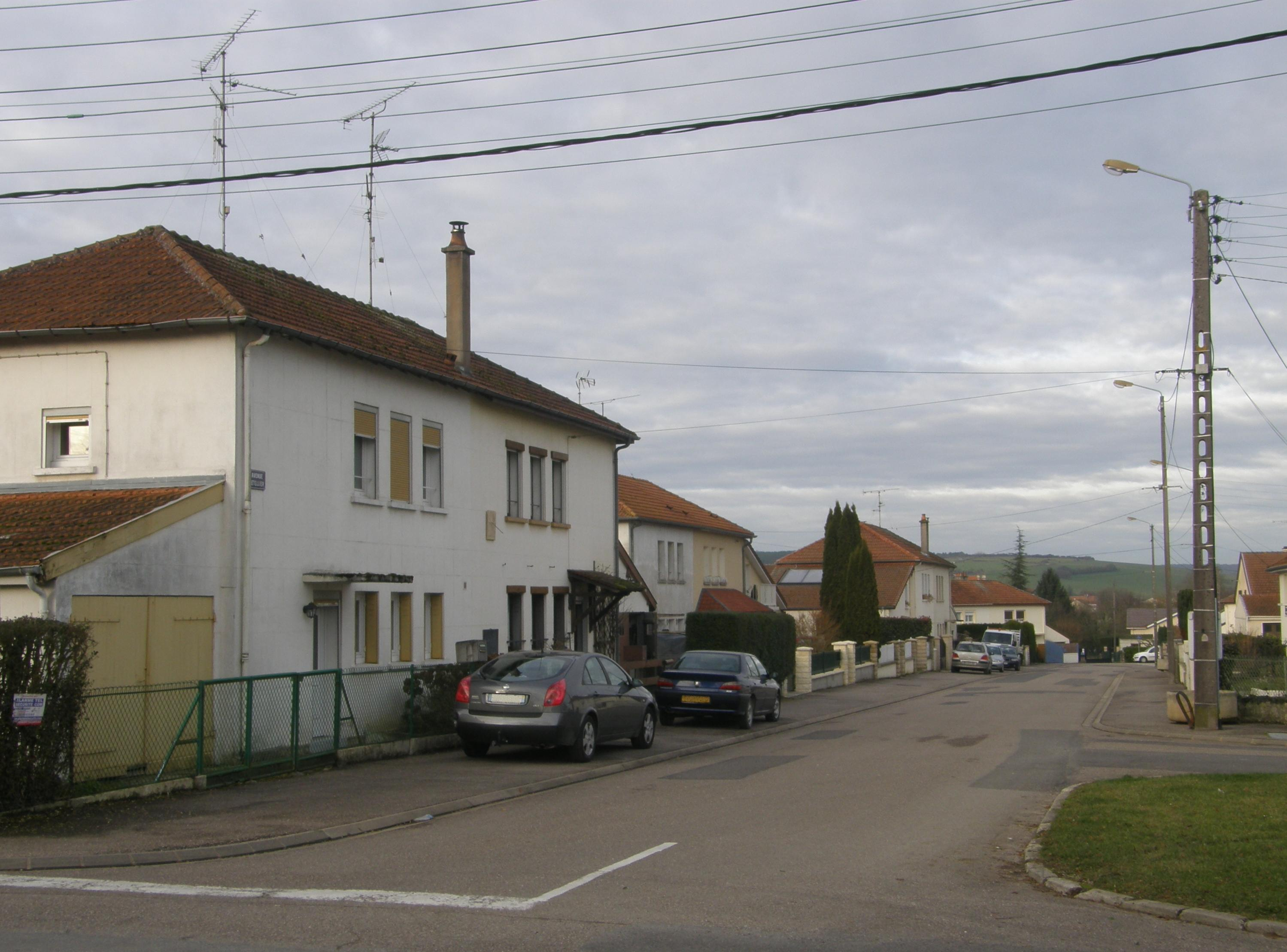
- « Avenue Letellier » from the « rue du 15ème Régiment de Chasseurs ».

- Coat of arms
- Location of Thierville-sur-Meuse
- Location within France Location within Grand Est
- Coordinates: 49°10′19″N 5°21′14″E
- Country: France
- Region: Grand Est
- Department: Meuse
- Arrondissement: Verdun
- Canton: Belleville-sur-Meuse
- Intercommunality: CA Grand Verdun

Government
  - Mayor (2020–2026): Claude Antion
- Area^{1}: 12.09 km^{2} (4.67 sq mi)
- Elevation: 204 m (669 ft)
- Highest elevation: 322 m (1,056 ft)
- Lowest elevation: 191 m (627 ft)
- Population (2023): 3,172
  - Density: 262.4/km^{2} (679.5/sq mi)
- Time zone: UTC+01:00 (CET)
  - Summer (DST): UTC+02:00 (CEST)
- INSEE/Postal code: 55505 /55840
- ^{1} French Land Register data, which excludes lakes, ponds, glaciers > 1 km^{2} (0.386 sq mi or 247 acres) and river estuaries.

Thierville-sur-Meuse (French pronunciation: [tjɛʁvil syʁ møz], literally Thierville on Meuse) is a commune in the Meuse department in Grand Est in north-eastern France.

== Population ==
Historical population
Year	Pop.	±% p.a.
1968	2,456	—
1975	2,158	−1.83%
1982	2,699	+3.25%
1990	2,795	+0.44%
1999	2,748	−0.19%
2007	3,149	+1.72%
2012	3,041	−0.70%
2017	3,118	+0.50%
2023	3,172	+0.29%
Source: INSEE

== See also ==
- Communes of the Meuse department
