= French Army =

Land warfare force of France

- Armée de terre
- Founded: 26 May 1445 (581 years, 132 days ago)
- Country: France
- Branch: Army
- Role: Land warfare
- Size: 118,600 active personnel 23,000 reserve personnel
- Part of: French Armed Forces
- Mottos: Honneur et Patrie 'Honour and Fatherland'
- Colours on logo: Blue, white, and red
- Engagements: List of conflicts: Hundred Years' War; Colonial Wars (1534–1980); Italian Wars; Thirty Years' War; War of the League of Augsburg; War of the Spanish Succession; War of the Polish Succession; War of the Austrian Succession; Seven Years' War; American Revolutionary War; French Revolutionary Wars; Napoleonic Wars; French intervention in Spain; Greek War of Independence; Conquest of Algeria; Belgian Revolution; Franco-Moroccan War; Cochinchina Campaign; Crimean War; Franco-Austrian War; Franco-Prussian War; Paris Commune; French conquest of Tunisia; Mandingo Wars; First Franco-Dahomean War; Second Franco-Dahomean War; Ouaddai War; First World War; Franco-Turkish War; Levant Campaign; Rif War; Second World War; Indochina War; Malagasy Uprising; Suez Crisis; Algerian War; Lebanese Civil War; United Nations Interim Force in Lebanon (1978–present); Gulf War; Kosovo War; 1999 East Timorese crisis; Operation Enduring Freedom; War in Afghanistan; Northern Mali Conflict; Second Ivorian Civil War; Central African Republic conflict
- Website: defense.gouv.fr/terre

Commanders
- Chief of the Armed Forces: President Emmanuel Macron
- Chief of the Defence Staff: Général d'armée aérienne Fabien Mandon
- Chief of the Army Staff: Army General Jacques Langlade de Montgros
- Major General of the French Army: Army Corps General Lionel Catar

The French Army (French: Armée de terre, lit. 'Land Army') is the land service branch of the French Armed Forces. The Army is commanded by the Chief of Staff of the French Army (CEMAT), who is subordinate to the Chief of the Defence Staff (CEMA), who in turn is responsible to the President of France. CEMAT is also directly responsible to the Ministry of Armed Forces for administration, preparation and equipment.

The French Army, following the French Revolution, has generally been composed of a mixed force of conscripts and professional volunteers. It is now considered an All-Volunteer Force (or professional) force, since the French Parliament suspended the conscription of soldiers.

== History ==
=== Early history ===
The first permanent army of France, which was paid with regular wages instead of being supplied by feudal levies, was established in the early 15th century under Charles VII. It was formed due to the need for reliable troops during the Hundred Years' War. Though, the Army was not disbanded because it saw continued use by the Kings of France following the conflict. Upon the outbreak of a conflict, an ordonnance would be issued to govern the length of service, composition and payment of units.

The Compagnies d'ordonnance formed the core of the Gendarme well into the 16th century, and were stationed throughout France and summoned into larger armies as needed. There was also provisions made for francs-archers, which was a militia of bowmen and foot soldiers raised from the non-noble classes, but the units were disbanded once war ended.

Meanwhile, the bulk of infantry was still provided by urban or provincial militias, which were raised from an area or city to fight locally and that were named for their recruiting grounds. Gradually, the units became more permanent, and in the late 15th century, Swiss instructors were recruited, and some of the 'Bandes' (Militia) were combined to form temporary 'Legions' of up to 9000 men. The men would be paid, contracted to fight and receive military training.

Henry II further regularised the French Army by forming standing infantry regiments to replace the Militia structure. The first of them (Régiments de Picardie, Piémont, Navarre and Champagne) were called Les Vieux Corps (The Old Corps). It was normal policy to disband regiments after a war was over as a cost-saving measure with the Vieux Corps and the French Royal Guard being the only survivors.

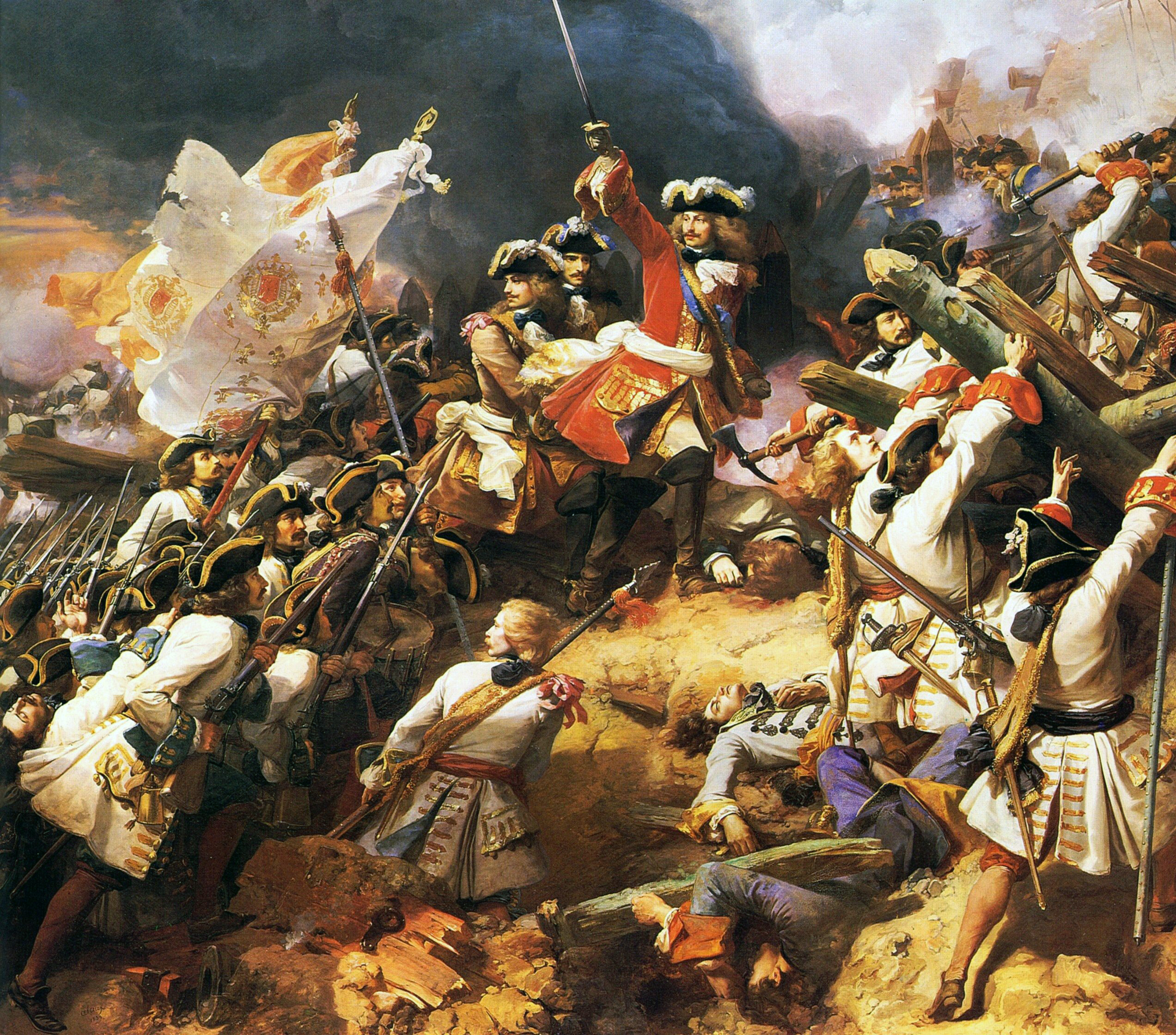
The Battle of Denain by Jean Alaux, 1839. The French Royal Army at the Battle of Denain in 1712

Regiments could be raised directly by the King and so be called after the region in which they were raised or by the nobility and so called after the noble or his appointed colonel. When Louis XIII came to the throne, he disbanded most of the regiments in existence, leaving only the Vieux and a handful of others, which became known as the Petite Vieux and also gained the privilege of not being disbanded after a war.

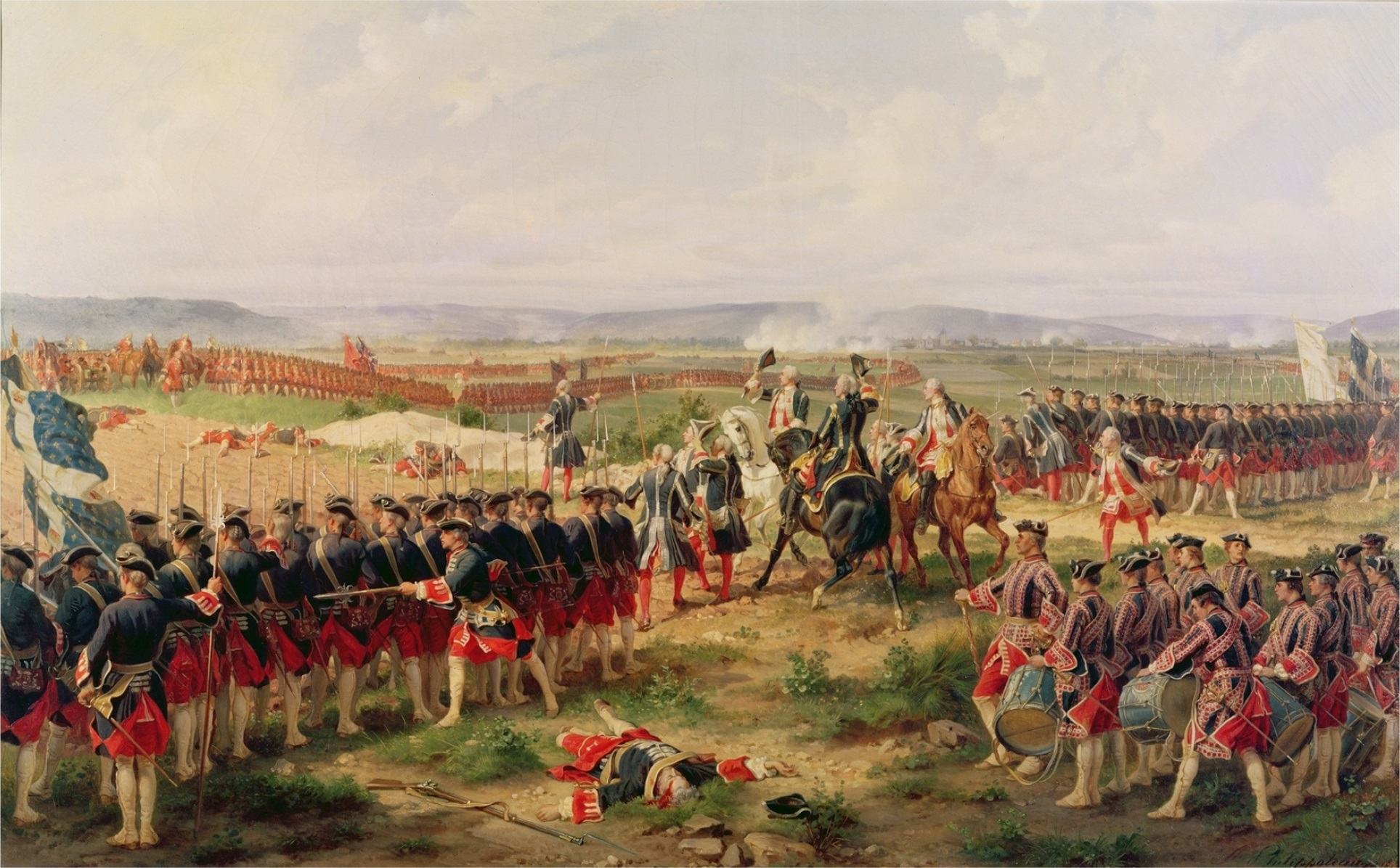
The Gardes françaises at the Battle of Fontenoy in 1745

In 1684, there was a major reorganisation of the French infantry and another in 1701 to fit in with Louis XIV's plans and the War of the Spanish Succession. The reshuffle created many of the modern regiments of the French Army and standardised their equipment and tactics. The army of the Sun King tended to wear grey-white coats with coloured linings. There were exceptions and the foreign troops, recruited from outside France, wore red (Swiss, Irish etc.) or blue (Germans, Scots etc.) while the French Guards wore blue. In addition to the regiments of the line the Maison du Roi provided several elite units, the Swiss Guards, French Guards and the Regiments of Musketeers being the most famous. The white/grey coated French Infantry of the line Les Blancs with their Charleville muskets were a feared foe on the battlefields of the seventeenth and eighteenth centuries, fighting in the Nine Years' War, the Wars of Spanish and Austrian Succession, the Seven Years' War and the American Revolution.

=== Wars of the Coalition ===
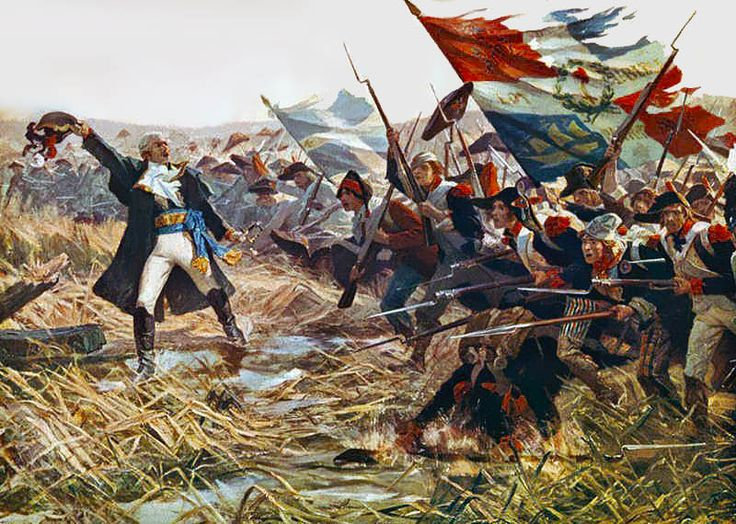
The French Revolutionary Army at the Battle of Jemappes in 1792

The French Revolution caused the Army to lose most of its officers to aristocratic flight or the guillotine, and thus it became demoralised and ineffective. The revolutionary militias of Sans-culottes, and the bourgeoise National Guard formed the nucleus of the French Revolutionary Army alongside the remnants of the dissolved Royal French Army; it was created following the storming of the Tuileries palace, where the French National Guard joined the revolt, the loyal Swiss Guards were massacred and the King was deposed.

From 1792, the Revolutionary Army fought against a combination of European powers in the French Revolutionary Wars, with the state directing most of its industry and population to war efforts, marking the start of modern conscription in the world, it also allowed more flexible military strategies, setting way for Napoleonic warfare. Moreover, many noble officers were retired, decreasing stratification and increasing military specialism. These, and the extreme investments into war efforts allowed France to begin a steady advance into Europe.

Under Napoleon I, the French Imperial Army conquered most of Europe during the Napoleonic Wars. Professionalising again from the Revolutionary forces and using columns of attack with heavy artillery support and swarms of pursuit cavalry the French army under Napoleon and his marshals was able to outmanoeuvre and destroy the allied armies repeatedly until 1812. Napoleon introduced the concept of all arms Corps, each one a traditional army 'in miniature', permitting the field force to be split across several lines of march and rejoin or to operate independently. The Grande Armée operated by seeking a decisive battle with each enemy army and then destroying them in detail before rapidly occupying territory and forcing a peace.

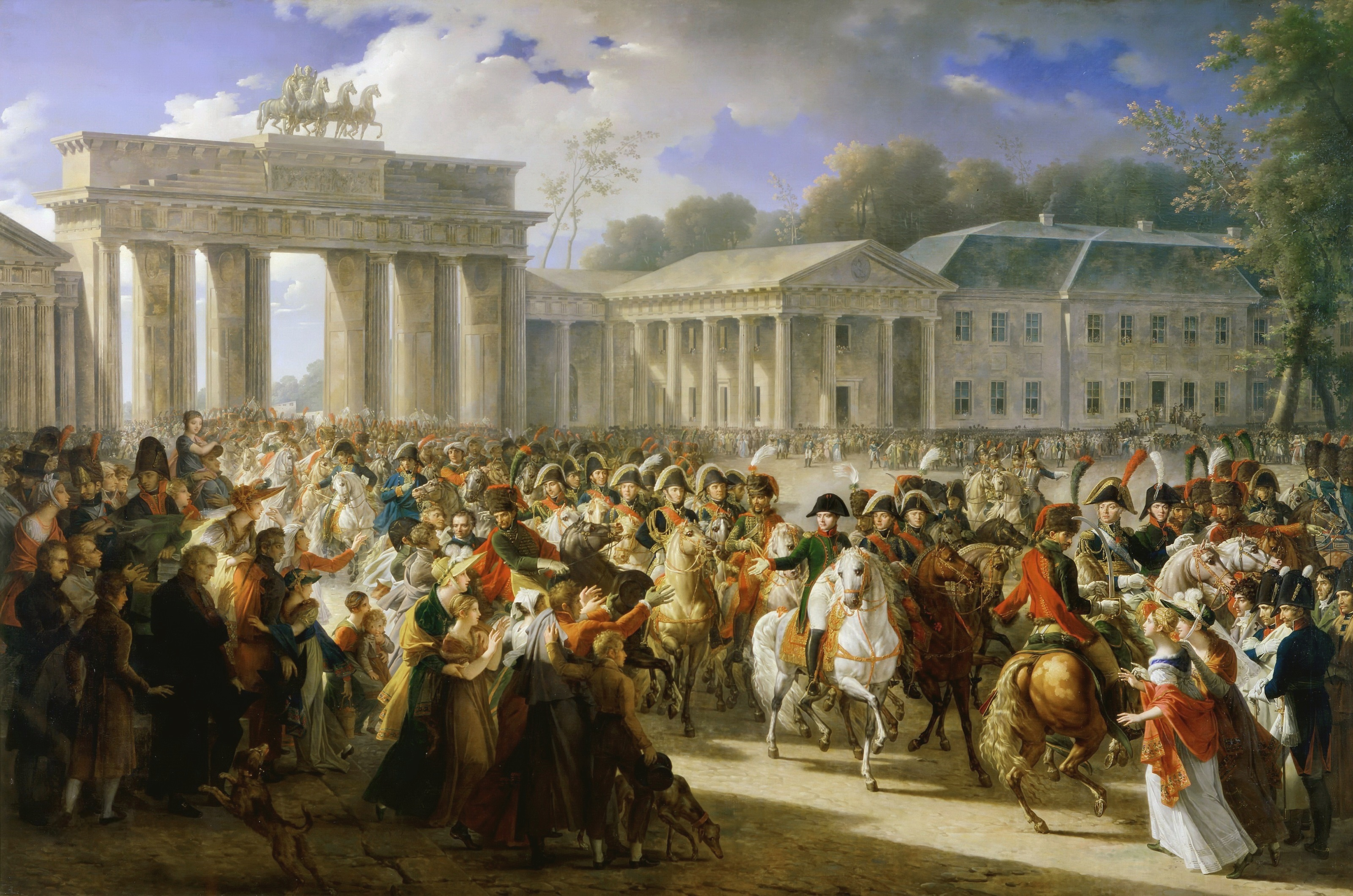
Entry of Napoleon into Berlin by Charles Meynier. After defeating Prussian forces at Jena, the Grande Armée entered Berlin on 27 October 1806

In 1812, Napoleon invaded the Russian Empire with a new Grande Armee, seeking to remove their influence from eastern Europe and secure the frontiers of his empire and client states. The campaign initially went well, but the vast distances of the Russian Steppe and its cold winter forced his army into a shambling retreat preyed on by Russian raids and pursuit. This force could not be replaced and with the "ulcer" of the ongoing war in the Iberian peninsula against Britain and Portugal, the French Army was badly short of trained troops and French manpower was almost exhausted.

After Napoleon's abdication and return, halted by an Anglo-Dutch and Prussian alliance at Waterloo, the French army was placed back under the restored Bourbon Monarchy. The structure remained largely unchanged and many officers of the Empire retained their positions.

=== The 19th century ===
The Bourbon restoration was a time of political instability with the country constantly on the verge of political violence. The army was committed to the restoration of Spanish monarchial absolutism in 1824. It achieved its aims in six months, but did not fully withdraw until 1828. By comparison with the earlier Napoleonic invasion, this expedition was rapid and successful.

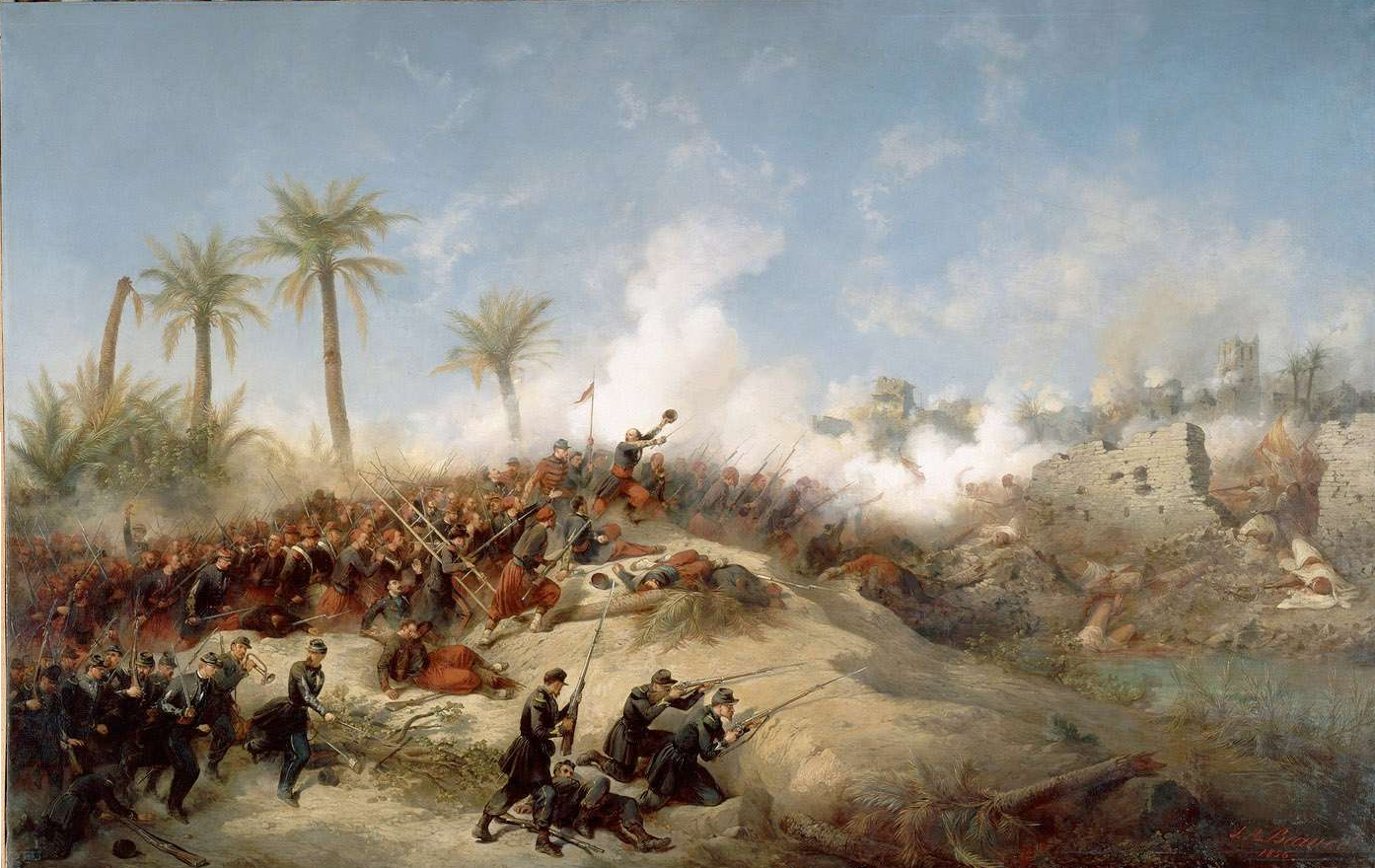
The Assault on Zaatcha by Jean-Adolphe Beaucé, 1855

Taking advantage of the weakness of the local bey, the French invasion of Algiers in 1830 again rapidly overcame initial resistance. The French government formally annexed Algeria but it took nearly 45 years to fully pacify the country. This period of French history saw the creation of the Armée d’Afrique, which included the Légion étrangère. The Army was now uniformed in dark blue coats and red trousers, which it would retain until the First World War.

The news of the fall of Algiers had barely reached Paris in 1830 when the Bourbon Monarchy was overthrown and replaced by the constitutional Orleans Monarchy. During the July 1830 revolution, the Paris mobs proved too much for the troops of the Maison du Roi and the main body of the French Army, sympathetic to the crowds, did not become heavily involved.

In 1848 a wave of revolutions swept Europe and brought an end to the French monarchy. The army was largely uninvolved in the street fighting in Paris which overthrew the King but later in the year troops were used in the suppression of the more radical elements of the new Republic which led to the election of Napoleon's nephew as president.

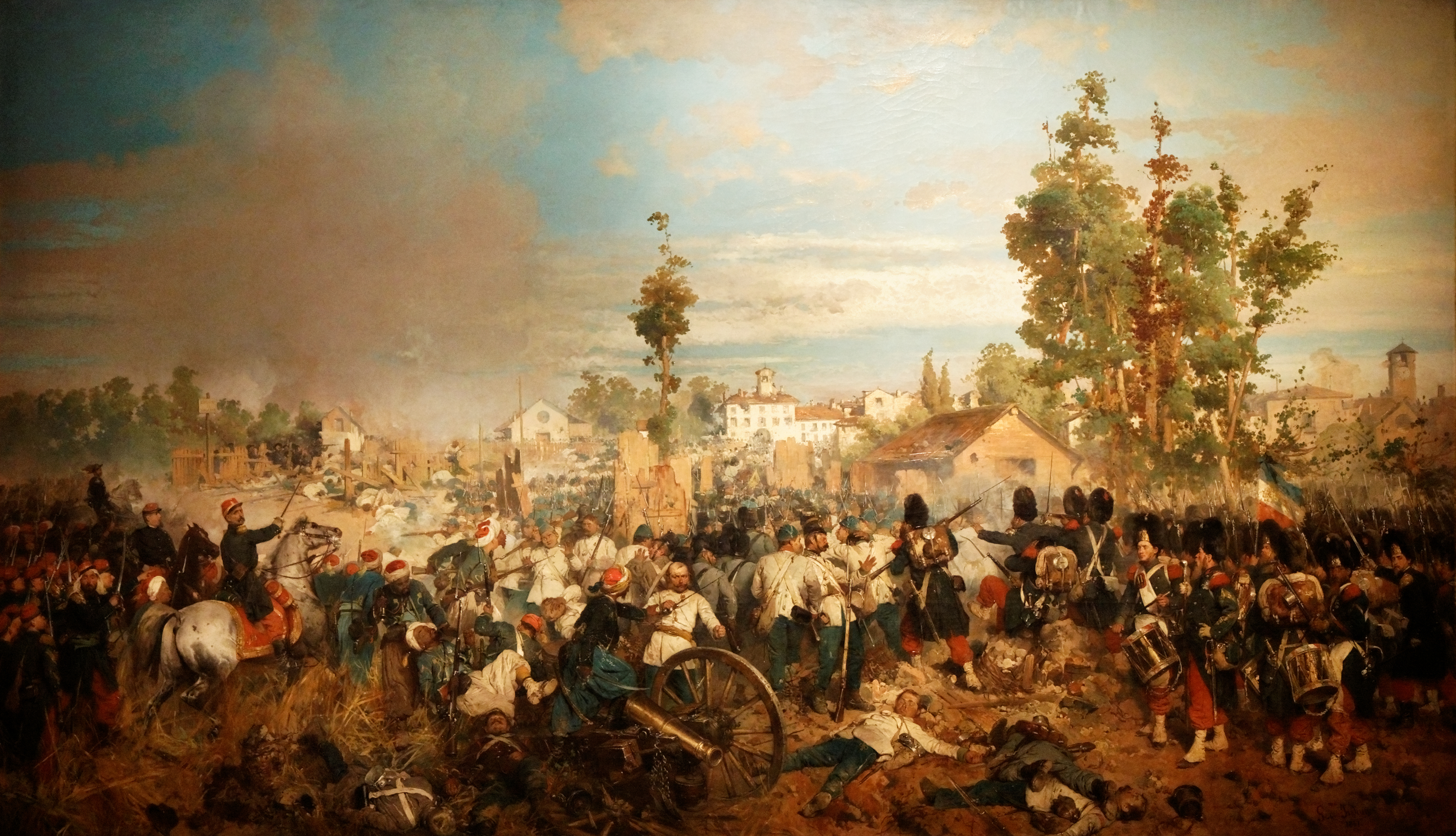
The Battle of Magenta

The Pope had been forced out of Rome as part of the Revolutions of 1848, and Louis Napoleon sent a 14,000 man expeditionary force of troops to the Papal State under General Charles Oudinot to restore him. In late April 1849, it was defeated and pushed back from Rome by Giuseppi Garibaldi's volunteer corps, but then recovered and recaptured Rome.

The French army was among the first in the world to be issued with Minié rifles, just in time for the Crimean War against Russia, allied with Britain. This invention gave line infantry a weapon with a much longer range and greater accuracy and lead to new flexible tactics. The French army was more experienced at mass manoeuvre and war fighting than the British and the reputation of the French army was greatly enhanced.

A series of colonial expeditions followed and in 1856 France joined the Second Opium War on the British side against China; obtaining concessions. French troops were deployed into Italy against the Austrians, the first use of railways for mass movement.

The French army was now considered to be an example to others and military missions to Japan and the emulation of French Zouaves in other militaries added to this prestige. However, an expedition to Mexico failed to create a stable puppet régime.

France was humiliated following its defeat in the Franco-Prussian War, and while the army had far superior infantry weapons in the form of the Chassepot and Mitrailleuse, its tactics and artillery were inferior, and by allowing the Prussian Army to take the initiative, the French Army was rapidly bottled up into its fortress towns and defeated. The loss of prestige within the army lead to a great emphasis on aggression and close quarter tactics.

=== The World Wars ===
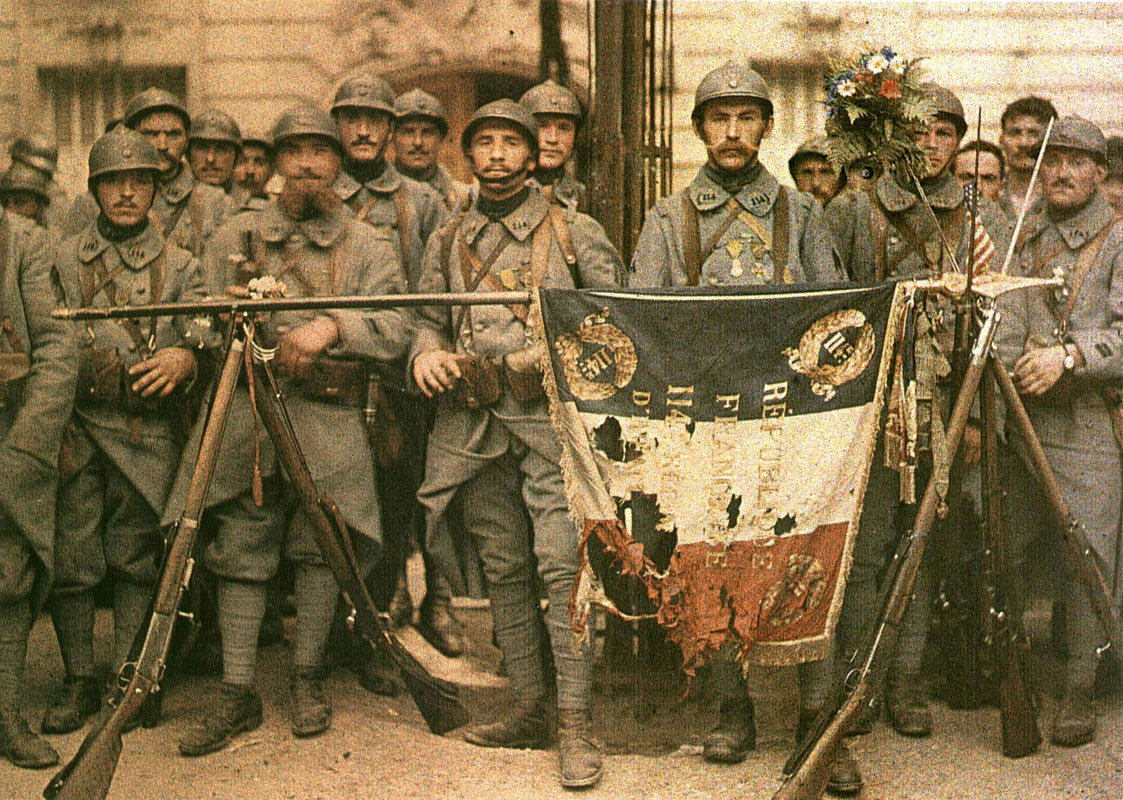
French Poilus posing with their war-torn flag in 1917, during World War I

In August 1914, following the outbreak of the Great War, the French Armed Forces numbered some 1,300,000 soldiers, and by the end of the war the French Army had called up 8,817,000 men, including 900,000 colonial troops; of these around 1,397,000 French soldiers were killed in action, mostly on the Western Front. French soldiers, at the beginning of the war, still wore the colourful uniforms of the Franco-Prussian War, with this conspicuous dress proving unsuited to the trenches and, accordingly, by 1915 the mostly blue and red peacetime uniforms had been replaced by bleu-horizon (light blue-grey), with the Adrian helmet in place of the kepi. The traditional capote of the French infantry continued to be worn in the trenches but in bleu-horizon. Colonial and North African soldiers adopted khaki uniforms.

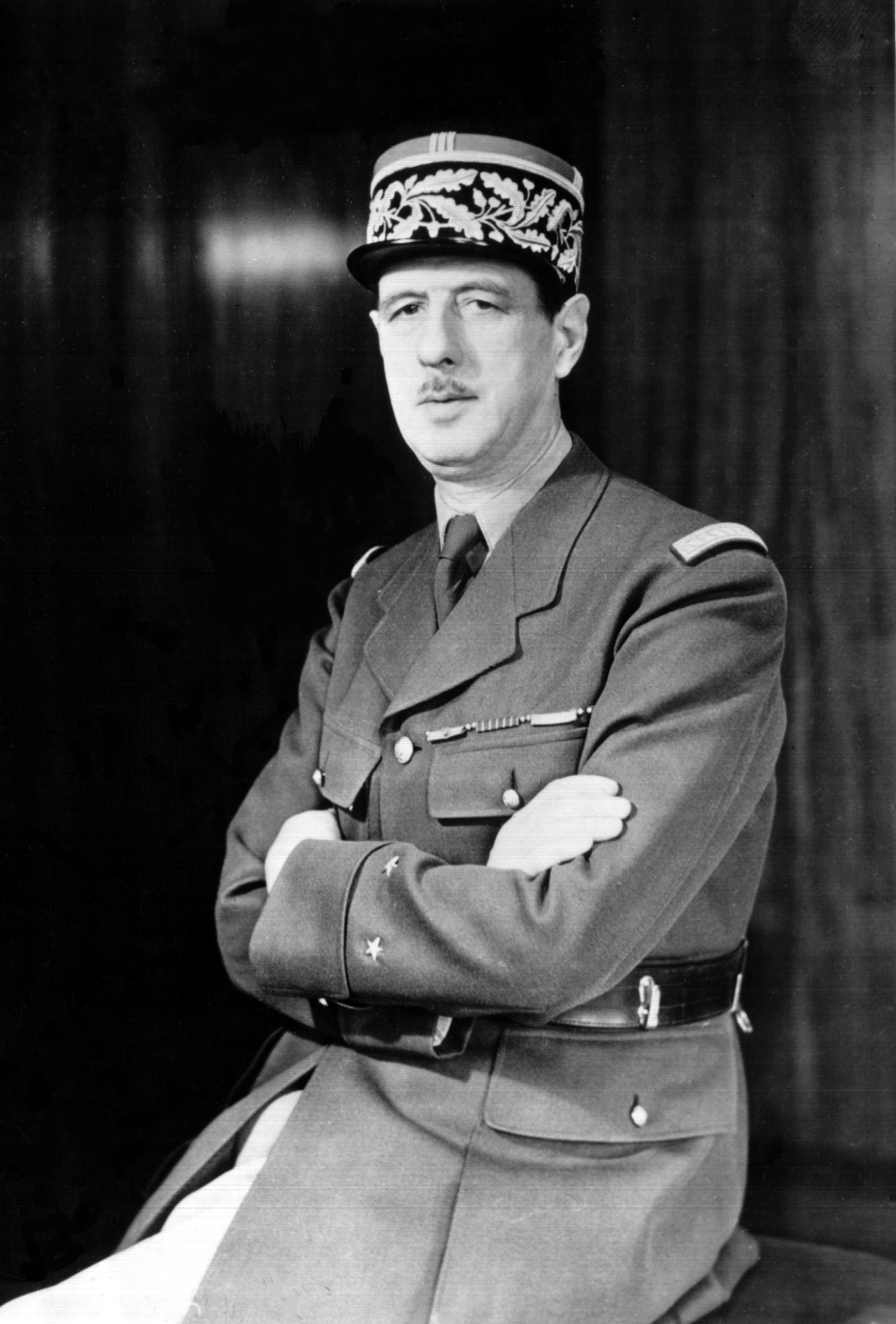
Brigadier general Charles de Gaulle

In May 1940, at the beginning of World War II's six-week long Battle of France, the French Army deployed 2,240,000 combatants grouped into 94 divisions (of which 20 were active and 74 were reservists) from the Swiss border to the North Sea.These numbers did not include the Army of the Alps facing Italy or the 600,000 men dispersed through the French colonial empire. After defeat in June 1940, the government of Vichy France was allowed to retain 100–120,000 Armistice Army personnel in the zone libre, as well as larger forces across the French colonial empire: more than 220,000 in Africa (including 140,000 in French North Africa), and forces in Mandate for Syria and the Lebanon and French Indochina. Free French Forces, under the command of Charles de Gaulle, continued the fight with the Allies until the final defeat of the Axis in 1945.

=== The Cold War ===
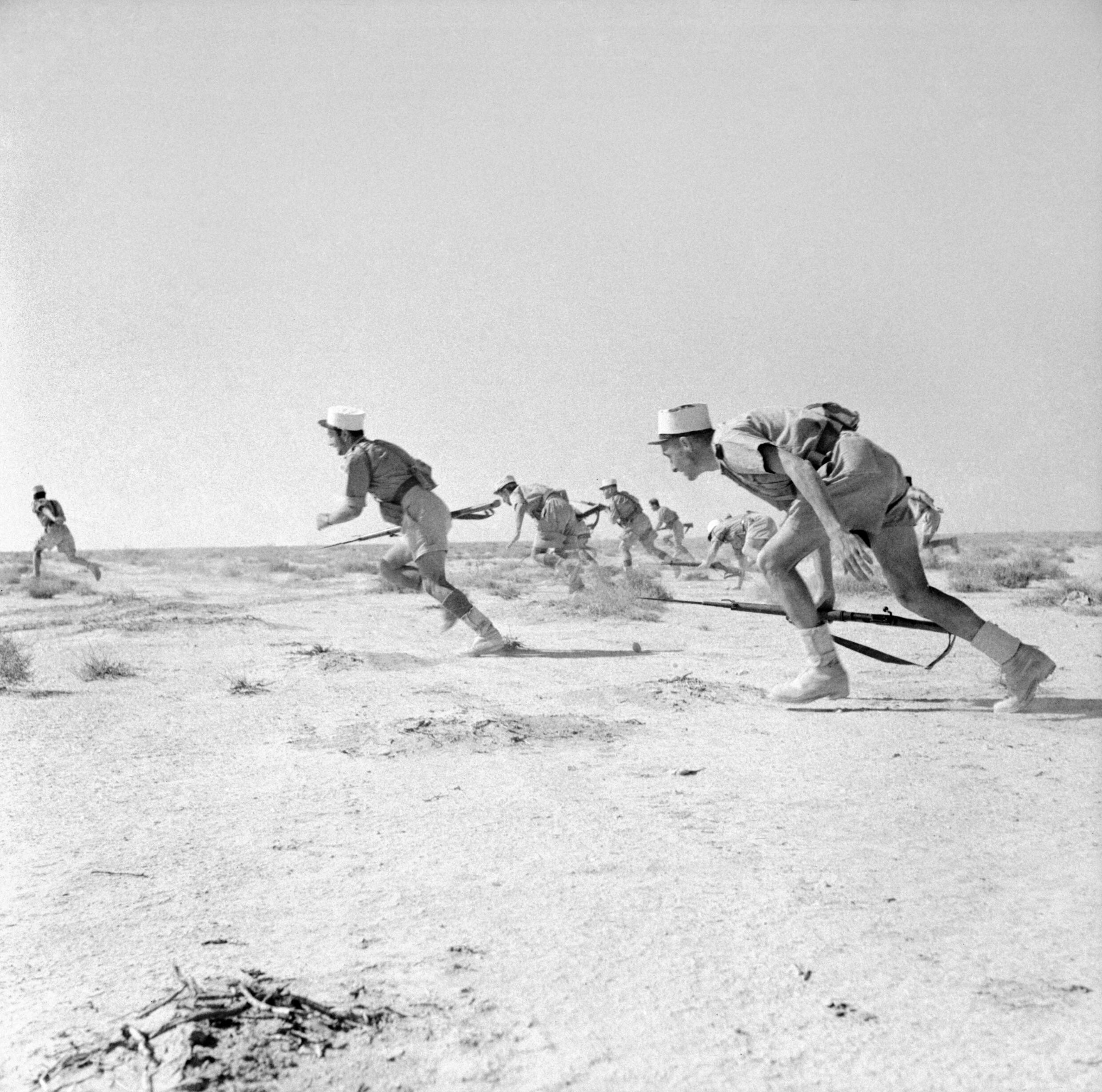
Free French Foreign Legionnaires at the Battle of Bir Hakeim in 1942

After 1945, despite enormous efforts in the First Indochina War of 1945–54 and the Algerian War of 1954–62, both lands eventually left French control. French units stayed in Germany after 1945, forming the French Forces in Germany. 5th Armored Division stayed on in Germany after 1945, while 1st and 3rd Armoured Divisions were established in Germany in 1951. However NATO-assigned formations were withdrawn to fight in Algeria; 5th Armoured Division arrived in Algeria in April 1956. From 1948 to 1966, many French Army units fell under the integrated NATO Military Command Structure. Commander-in-Chief Allied Forces Central Europe was a French Army officer, and many key NATO staff positions were filled by Frenchmen. While an upper limit of 14 French divisions committed to NATO had been set by the Treaty of Paris, the total did not exceed six divisions during the Indochina War, and during the Algerian War the total fell as low as two divisions.

The Army created two parachute divisions in 1956, the 10th Parachute Division under the command of General Jacques Massu and the 25th Parachute Division under the command of General Sauvagnac. After the Algiers putsch, the two divisions, with the 11th Infantry Division, were merged into a new light intervention division, the 11th Light Intervention Division, on 1 May 1961.

During the Cold War, the French Army, though leaving the NATO Military Command Structure in 1966, planned for the defence of Western Europe. In 1977 the French Army switched from multi-brigade divisions to smaller divisions of about four to five battalions/regiments each. From the early 1970s, 2nd Army Corps was stationed in South Germany, and effectively formed a reserve for NATO's Central Army Group. In the 1980s, 3rd Army Corps headquarters was moved to Lille and planning started for its use in support of NATO's Northern Army Group. The Rapid Action Force of five light divisions, including the new 4th Airmobile and 6th Light Armoured Divisions, was also intended as a NATO reinforcement force. In addition, the 152nd Infantry Division was maintained to guard the S3 intercontinental ballistic missile base on the Plateau d'Albion.

In the 1970s–1980s, two light armoured divisions were planned to be formed from school staffs (the 12th and 14th). The 12th Light Armoured Division (12 DLB) was to have its headquarters to be formed on the basis of the staff of the Armoured and Cavalry Branch Training School at Saumur.

In the late 1970s an attempt was made to form 14 reserve light infantry divisions, but this plan was too ambitious. The planned divisions included the 102nd, 104th, 107th, 108th, 109th, 110th, 111th, 112th, 114th, 115th, and 127th Infantry Divisions. From June 1984, the French Army reserve consisted of 22 military divisions, administering all reserve units in a certain area, seven brigades de zone de défense, 22 régiments interarmées divisionnaires, and the 152nd Infantry Division, defending the ICBM launch sites. The plan was put into action from 1985, and brigades de zone, such as the 107th Brigade de Zone, were created. But with the putting-in-place of the "Réserves 2000" plan, the brigades de zone were finally disbanded by mid-1993. (Note: In 1986, the 109th Infantry Division was restructured into the 109th Brigade de Zone. In 1992, as part of the " Armée 2000 " plan, the brigade became the 109th brigade régionale de défense (109th Regional Defence Brigade).) 1st Army Corps was disbanded on 1 July 1990; 2nd Army Corps in August 1993.

==== Decolonisation ====
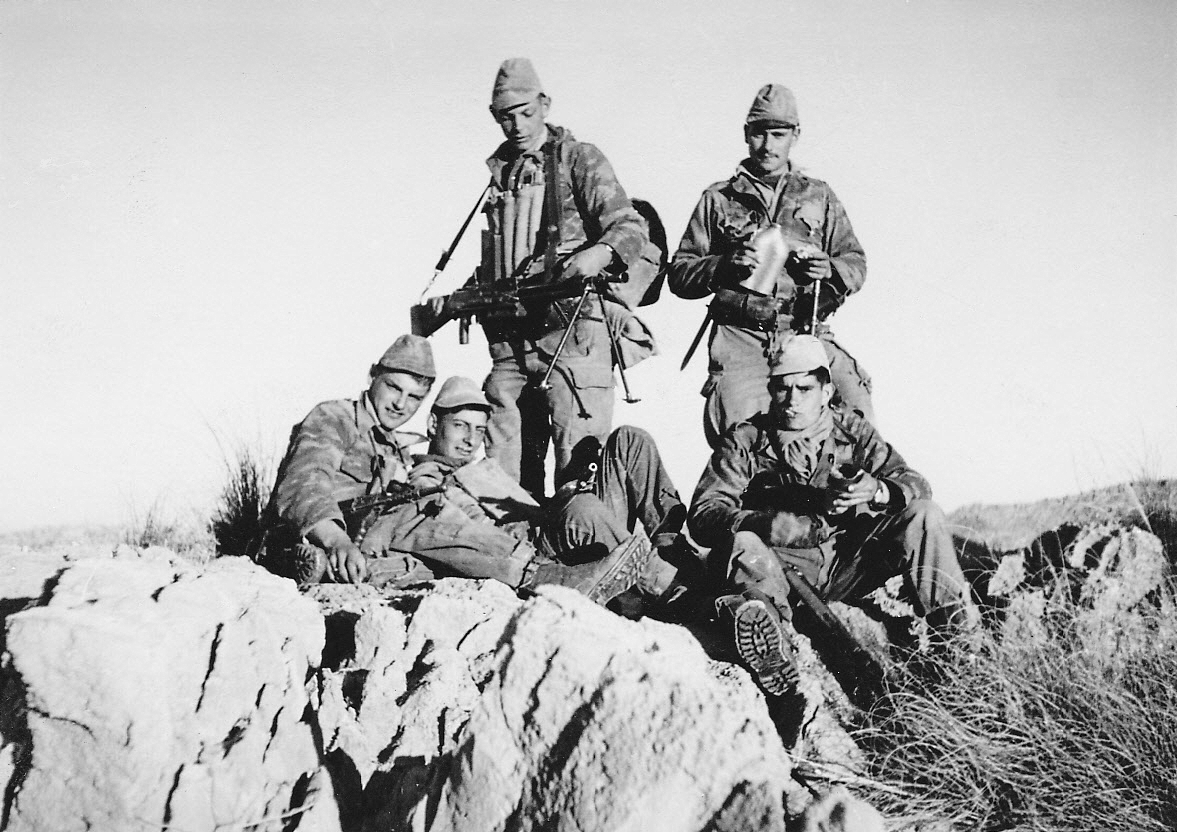
Soldiers of the 4th zouaves regiment during the Algerian War

At the end of the Second World War, France was immediately confronted with the beginnings of the decolonisation movement. The French army, which had employed indigenous North African spahis and tirailleurs in almost all of its campaigns since 1830, was the leading force in opposition to decolonization, which was perceived as a humiliation. In Algeria the Army repressed an extensive rising in and around Sétif in May 1945 with heavy fire: figures for Algerian deaths vary between 45,000 as claimed by Radio Cairo at the time and the official French figure of 1,020.

The Army saw maintaining control of Algeria as a high priority. By this time, one million French settlers had established themselves, alongside an indigenous population of nine million. When it decided that politicians were about to sell them out and give independence to Algeria, the Army engineered a military coup that toppled the civilian government and put General de Gaulle back in power in the May 1958 crisis. De Gaulle, however, recognized that Algeria was a dead weight and had to be cut free. Four retired generals then launched the Algiers putsch of 1961 against de Gaulle himself, but it failed. After 400,000 deaths, Algeria finally became independent. Hundreds of thousands of Harkis, Muslims loyal to Paris, went into exile in France, where they and their children and grandchildren remain in poorly assimilated "banlieue" suburbs.

The Army repressed the Malagasy Uprising in Madagascar in 1947. French officials estimated the number of Malagasy killed from a low of 11,000 to a French Army estimate of 89,000.

=== Recent history (1996–present) ===
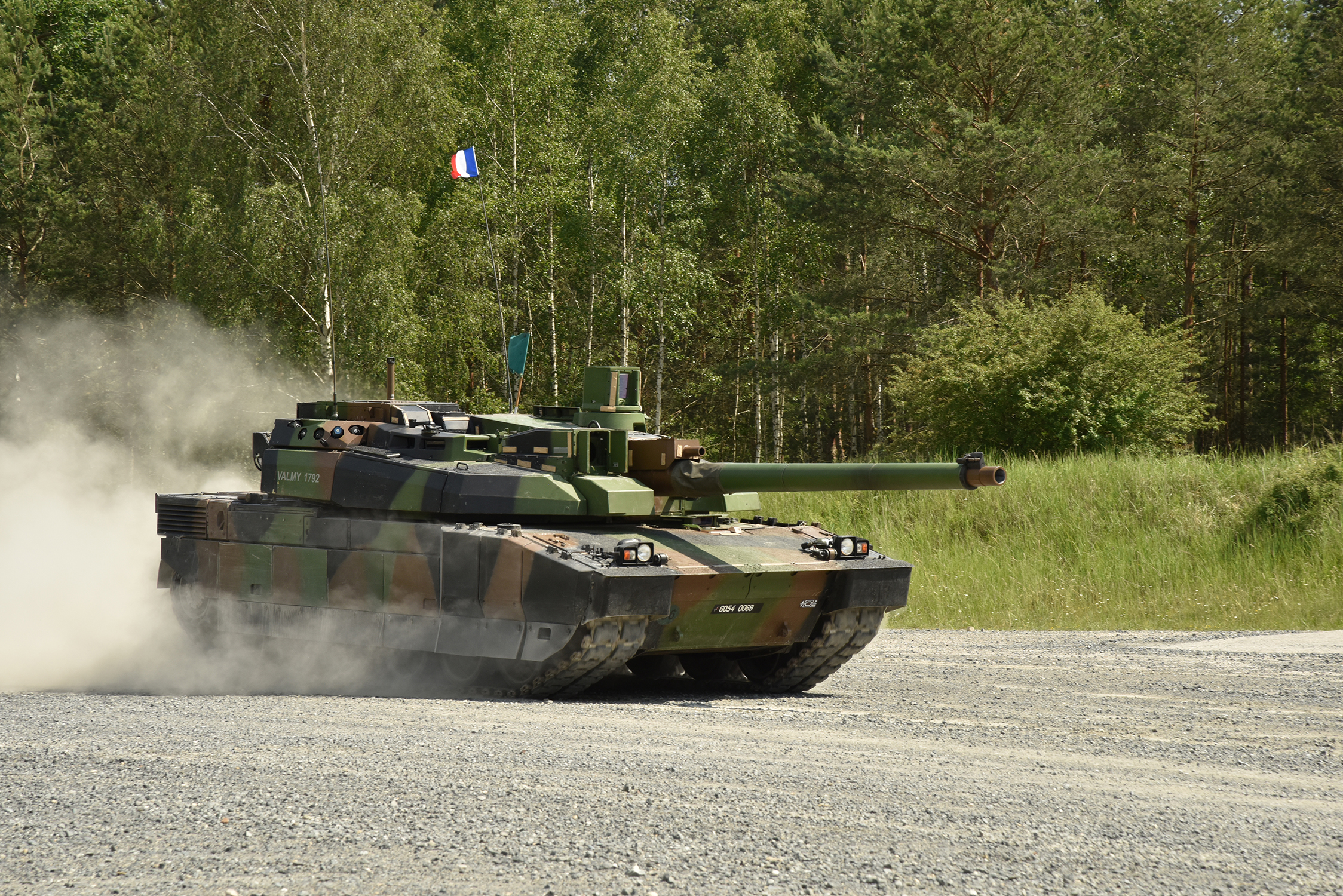
A French Leclerc tank in camouflage Central-Europe in 2018

In February 1996, President Jacques Chirac began the transition of the Army to a professional force, and as part of the resulting changes, ten regiments were dissolved in 1997.

On 1 July 1997, the specialized support brigades were transferred to various communes; Lunéville for signals, Haguenau for artillery and Strasbourg for engineers. On 1 September 1997, the 2nd Armoured Division left Versailles and was installed at Châlons-en-Champagne in place of the disbanded 10th Armoured Division. On 5 March 1998, in view of the ongoing structural adoptions of the French Army, the Minister of Defence decided to disband III Corps, and the dissolution became effective 1 July 1998. The headquarters transitioned to become Headquarters Commandement de la force d'action terrestre (CFAT) (the Land Forces Action Command).

During the professionalisation process, numbers decreased from the 236,000 (132,000 conscripts) in 1996 to around 140,000. By June 1999, the Army's strength was 186,000, including around 70,000 conscripts. 38 of 129 regiments were planned to be stood down from 1997 to 1999. The previous structure's nine 'small' divisions and sundry separate combat and combat support brigades were replaced by nine combat and four combat support brigades. The Rapid Action Force, a corps of five small rapid-intervention divisions formed in 1983, was also disbanded, though several of its divisions were re-subordinated.

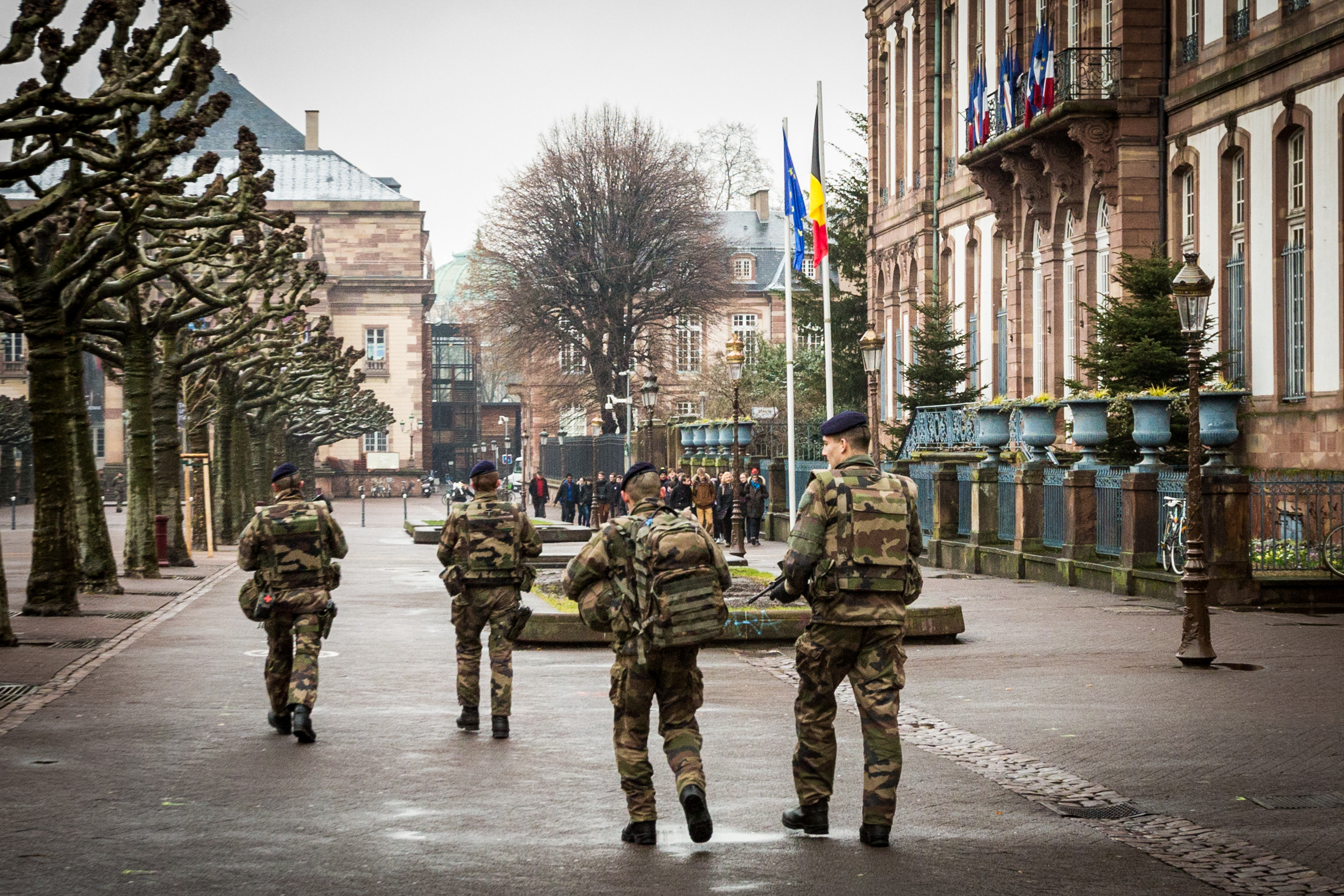
Soldiers on patrol during Opération Sentinelle in 2015

Opération Sentinelle is a French military operation with 10,000 soldiers and 4,700 police and gendarmes deployed since the aftermath of the January 2015 Île-de-France attacks, with the objective of protecting sensitive "points" of the territory from terrorism. It was reinforced during the November 2015 Paris attacks, and was part of a state of emergency in France due to continued terror threats and attacks.

== Organisation ==
The organisation of the army is fixed by Chapter 2 of Title II of Book II of the Third Part of the Code of Defense, notably resulting in the codification of Decree 2000-559 of 21 June 2000.

In terms of Article R.3222-3 of the Code of Defence, the Army comprises:

- The Army Chief of Staff (Chef d'état-major de l'armée de Terre (CEMAT)).
- The army staff (l'état-major de l'armée de Terre or EMAT), which gives general direction and management of all the components;
- The Army Inspectorate (l'inspection de l'armée de Terre);
- The Army Human Resources Directorate (la direction des ressources humaines de l'armée de Terre or DRHAT);
- The forces;
- A territorial organisation (seven regions, see below);
- The services;
- The personnel training and military higher training organisms.

The French Army was reorganized in 2014. The new organisation consists of two combined divisions (carrying the heritage of 1st Armored and 3rd Armored divisions) and given three combat brigades to supervise each. There is also the Franco-German Brigade. The 4th Airmobile Brigade was reformed to direct the three combat helicopter regiments. There are also several division-level (niveau divisionnaire) specialized commands including Intelligence, Information and communication systems, Maintenance, Logistics, Special Forces, Army Light Aviation, the Foreign Legion, National Territory, Training.

=== Arms of the French Army ===
The Army is divided into arms (armes). They include the Infantry (which includes the Chasseurs Alpins, specialist mountain infantry, the Troupes de Marine, heirs of colonial troops and specialist amphibious troops), the Armoured Cavalry Arm (Arme Blindée Cavalerie), the Artillery, the Engineering Arm (l'arme du génie), Matériel, Logistics (Train) and Signals (Transmissions). Each brigade will have several armes within its units.

The French Foreign Legion was established in 1831 for foreign nationals willing to serve in the French Armed Forces. The Legion is commanded by French officers. It is an elite military unit numbering around 9,000 troops. The Legion has gained worldwide recognition for its service, most recently in Operation Enduring Freedom in Afghanistan since 2001. It is not strictly an Arme but a commandement particulier, whose regiments belong to several arms, notably the infantry and the engineering arm.

The Troupes de marine are the former Colonial Troops. They are the first choice units for overseas deployment and recruit on this basis. They are composed of Marine Infantry (Infanterie de Marine) (which includes parachute regiments such as 1er RPIMa and a tank unit, the Régiment d'infanterie-chars de marine) and the Marine Artillery (Artillerie de Marine).

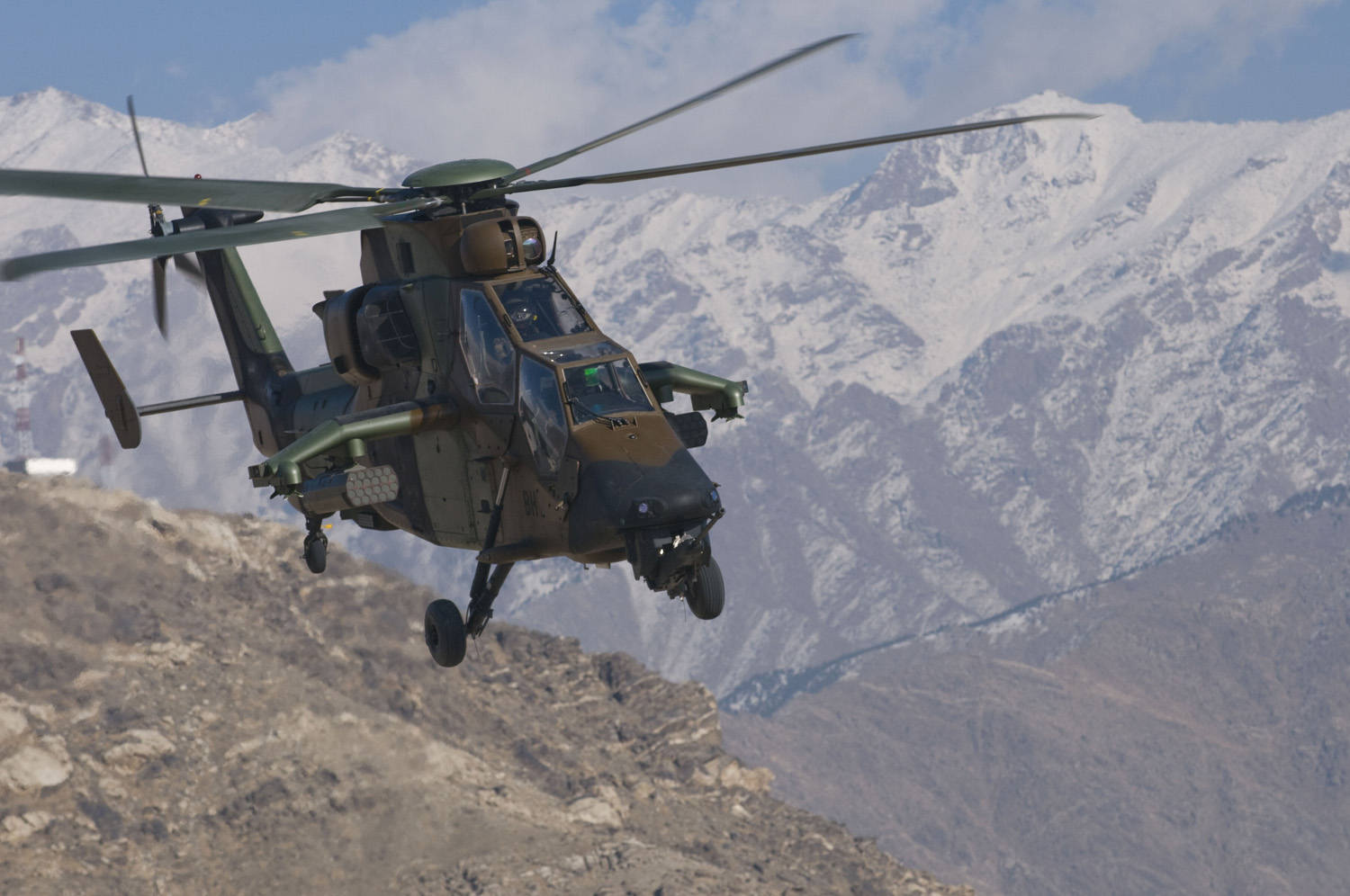
Eurocopter Tiger

The Aviation légère de l'armée de Terre (ALAT, which translates as Army Light Aviation), was established on 22 November 1954 for observation, reconnaissance, assault and supply duties. It operates numerous helicopters in support of the French Army, its primary attack helicopter is the Eurocopter Tiger, of which 80 were ordered. It is an Arme with a commandement particulier.

=== Administrative services ===
On the administrative side, there are now no more than one Directorate and two services.

The Army Human Resources Directorate (DRHAT) manages human resources (military and civilian) of the Army and training.

The two Services are the service of ground equipment, and the integrated structure of operational maintenance of terrestrial materials (SIMMT, former DCMAT). This joint oriented service is responsible for project management support for all land equipment of the French army. The holding-operational equipment the Army is headed by the Service de maintenance industrielle terrestre (SMITer).

Historically there were other services of the Army who were all grouped together with their counterparts in other components to form joint agencies serving the entire French Armed Forces.

After the health service and the fuel service were both replaced respectively by the French Defence Health service and Military Fuel Service, other services have disappeared in recent years:

- In 2005, the Army historical service (SHAT) became the "Land" department of the Defence Historical Service (Service historique de la défense);
- In September 2005, the Central Engineering Directorate (Direction centrale du génie, DCG) was merged with its counterparts in the air force and the navy to form the Central Directorate of Defense Infrastructure (Direction centrale du service d'infrastructure de la défense);
- On 1 January 2006, the Central Directorate of Telecommunications and Informatics (DCTEI) was incorporated into the Central Directorate of the Joint Directorate of Infrastructure Networks and Information Systems (DIRISI);

The Army Commissariat was dissolved on 31 December 2009 and intégrated into the joint-service Service du commissariat des armées.

There is the Diocese of the French Armed Forces which provides pastoral care to Catholic members of the Army. It is headed by Luc Ravel and is headquartered in Les Invalides.

=== Military regions ===
On 24 July 1873, the French Parliament passed a law which created 18 military regions in metropolitan France. A 19th Army Corps was created in Algeria in September 1873 (see Région militaire). In 1905, the strength of the Troupes coloniales stationed in the 19 military districts of metropolitan France was reported at 2,123 officers and 26,581 other ranks. In 1946, following the Second World War ten military regions were created or recreated, in accordance with a decree of 18 February 1946. They included the 1st (Paris); 2e (Lille); 3e (Rennes); 4e (Bordeaux); 5e (Toulouse); 6e (Metz); 7e (Dijon); 8th (Lyon); the 9th (Marseille), and the 10th in Algeria. The 10th Military Region (France) supervised French Algeria during the Algerian War.

The Défense opérationnelle du territoire supervised reserve and home defence activities from 1959 to the 1970s. However, by the 1980s the number had been reduced to six: the 1st Military Region (France) with its headquarters in Paris, the 2nd Military Region (France) at Lille, the 3rd Military Region (France) at Rennes, the 4th Military Region (France) at Bordeaux, the 5th at Lyons and the 6th at Metz. Each supervised up to five division militaire territoriale – military administrative sub-divisions, in 1984 sometimes supervising up to three reserve regiments each. Today, under the latest thorough reform of the French security and defence sector, there are seven Zone de défense et de sécurité each with a territorial ground army region: Paris (or Île-de-France, HQ in Paris), Nord (HQ in Lille), Ouest (HQ in Rennes), Sud-Ouest (HQ in Bordeaux), Sud (HQ in Marseille), Sud-Est (HQ in Lyon), Est (HQ in Strasbourg).

== Personnel ==
=== Strength ===
Personnel strength of the French Army 2022
Category	Strength
Commissioned officers	14,155
Non-commissioned officers	38,684
EVAT	61,372
VDAT	466
Civilian employees	8,119
Source: Ministère de Armées

As of 2020, the French Army employed 118,600 personnel; this includes the 9,000-strong French Foreign Legion and 8,500-strong Paris Fire Brigade. In addition, the reserves of the French Army consist of 25,000 personnel.

=== Contracts ===
Enlistment contracts for French army soldiers can range from a one to a five-year contract, which are all renewable. Meanwhile, Non-commissioned officers serve on permanent contracts, or exceptionally on renewable five years-contracts. Though NCO candidates are required to have a high school diploma that grants them access to university. École Nationale des Sous-Officiers d’Active (ENSOA), Basic NCO school of 8 months, followed by combat school of 4 to 36 weeks depending on occupational specialty. A small number of NCO candidates are trained at the Ecole Militaire de Haute Montagne (EMHM) (High Mountain Military School). NCOs with the Advanced Army Technician Certificate (BSTAT) can serve as platoon leaders.

All Career officers serve on permanent contracts, with direct entry cadets with two years of Classe préparatoire aux grandes écoles or a bachelor's degree spend three years at École Spéciale Militaire de Saint-Cyr (ESM), and graduate as First Lieutenants. Direct entry cadets with a master's degree spend one year at ESM, and graduate as First Lieutenants. Non-commissioned officers with three years in the army, spend two years at École militaire interarmes, and graduate as First Lieutenants. 50% of the commissioned officers in the French Army are former NCOs.

Contract officers serve on renewable contracts for a maximum of 20 years service. A bachelor's degree is required. There are two different programs, combat officers and specialist officers. Officers in both programs graduate as Second Lieutenants and may reach Lieutenant Colonels rank. Combat officers spend eight months at ESM, followed by one year at a combat school. Specialist officers spend three months at ESM, followed by a year of on the job-training within an area of specialization determined by the type of degree held.

=== Women ===
Civilian women were hired by the French army in the First World War, thereby opening new opportunities for them, forcing a redefinition of military identity, and revealing the strength of anti-Republicanism within the Army. Officers by the 1920s accepted women as part of their institution.

=== Code ===
In 1999, the Army issued the Code of the French Soldier, which includes the injunctions:

Mastering his own strength, he respects his opponent and is careful to spare civilians. He obeys orders while respecting laws, customs of war and international conventions. (...) He is aware of global societies and respects their differences. (Note: Original French: Maître de sa force, il respecte l'adversaire et veille à épargner les populations. Il obéit aux ordres, dans le respect des lois, des coutumes de la guerre et des conventions internationales. (...) Il est ouvert sur le monde et la société, et en respecte les différences. : "Le code du soldat".)

== Rank insignia ==
=== Commissioned officer ranks ===
The rank insignia of commissioned officers.

NATO code	OF-10	OF-9	OF-8	OF-7	OF-6	OF-5	OF-4	OF-3	OF-2	OF-1
French Army
French Army	Maréchal de France	Général d'armée	Général de corps d'armée	Général de division	Général de brigade	Colonel	Lieutenant-colonel	Commandant	Capitaine	Lieutenant	Sous-lieutenant

=== Other ranks ===
The rank insignia of non-commissioned officers and enlisted personnel.

NATO code	OR-9		OR-8	OR-7	OR-6	OR-5	OR-4		OR-3	OR-2	OR-1
French Army
French Army	Major	Adjudant-chef	Adjudant	Sergent-chef BM2/ Maréchal-des-logis-chef BM2	Sergent-chef/ Maréchal-des-logis-chef	Sergent/ Maréchal-des-logis	Caporal-chef de 1^{re} classe	Caporal-chef/ Brigadier-chef	Caporal/ Brigadier	Soldat de 1^{re} classe	Soldat

== Equipment ==
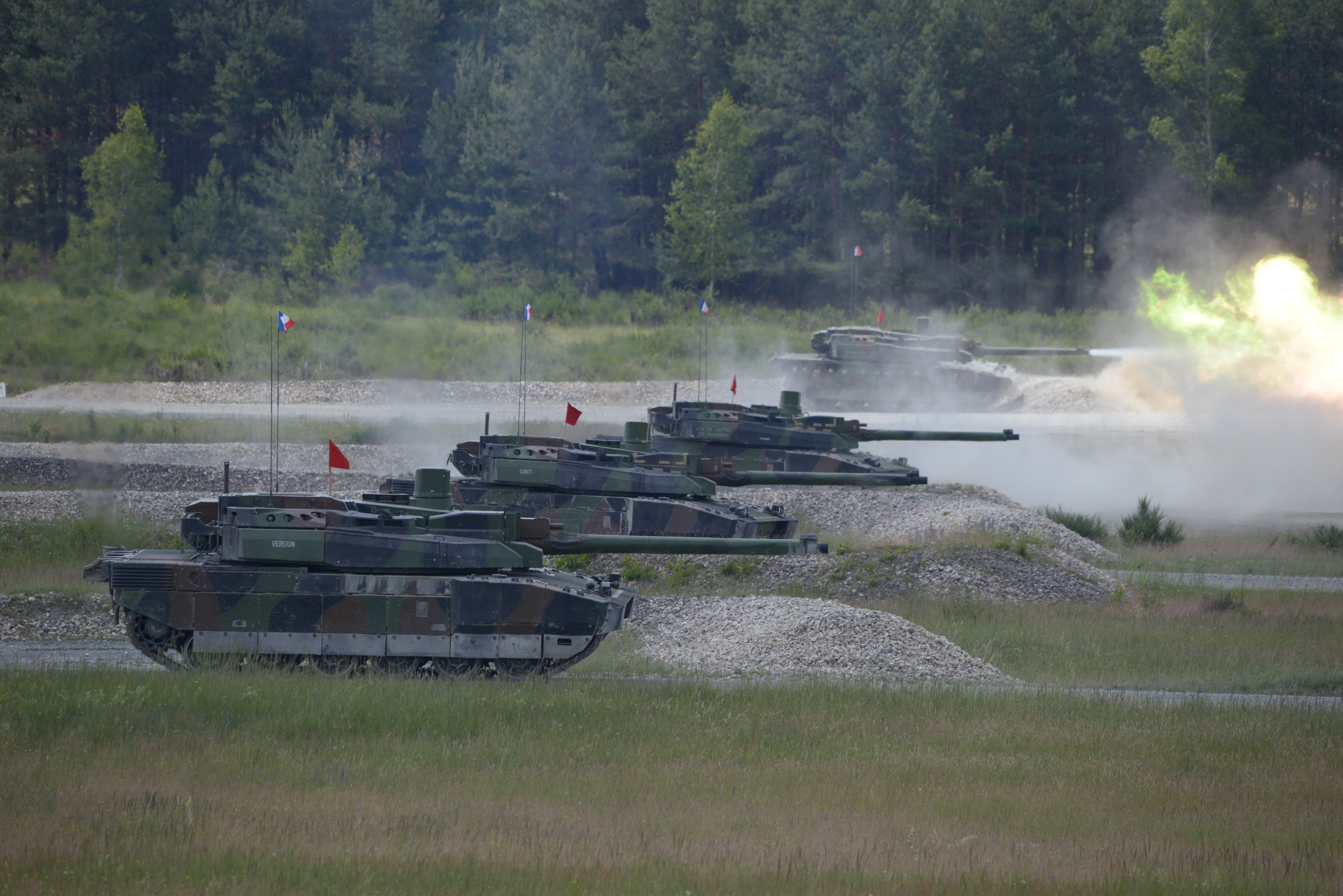
Leclerc tanks (1er régiment de chasseurs)

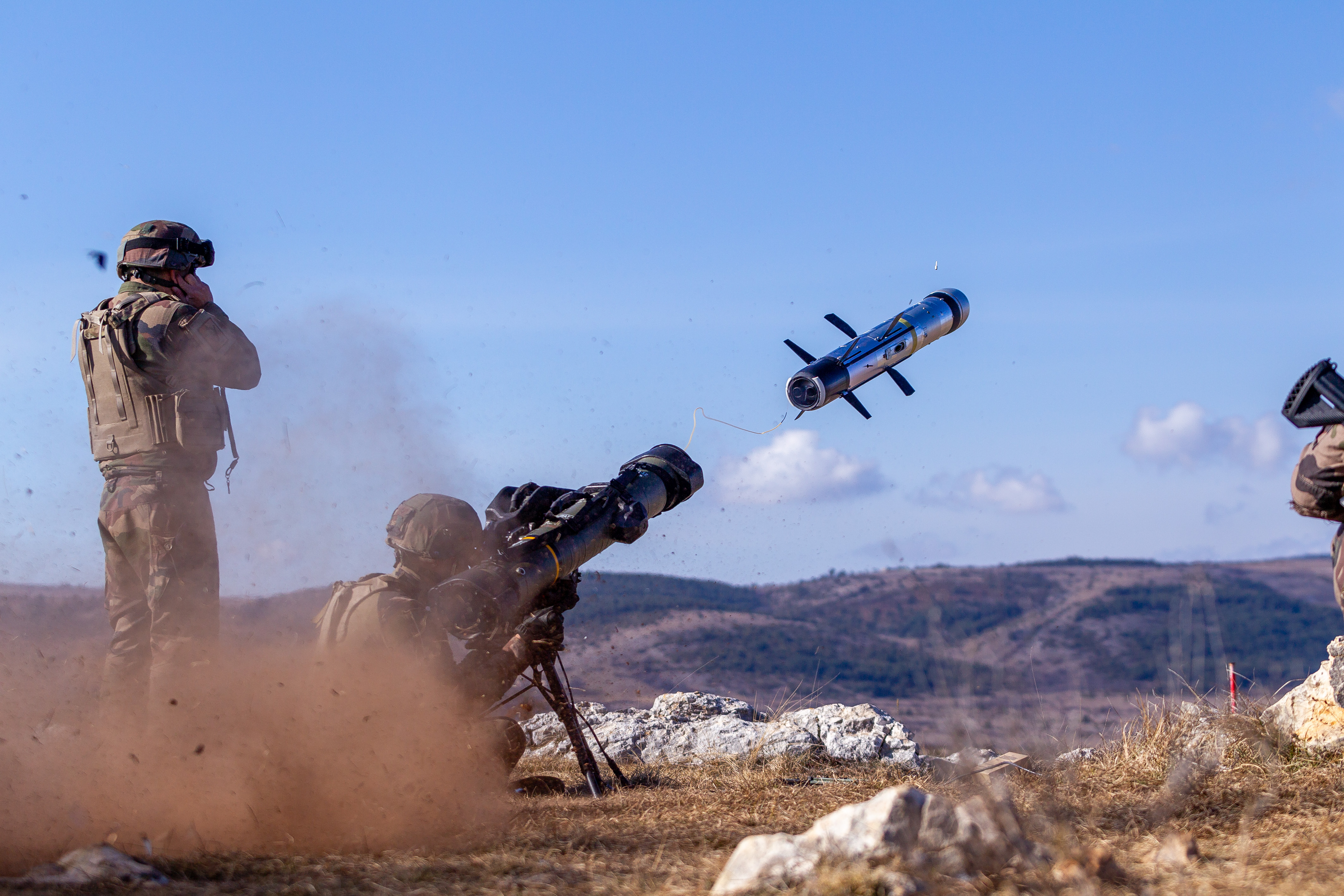
Firing a medium-range missile (2e régiment étranger d'infanterie)

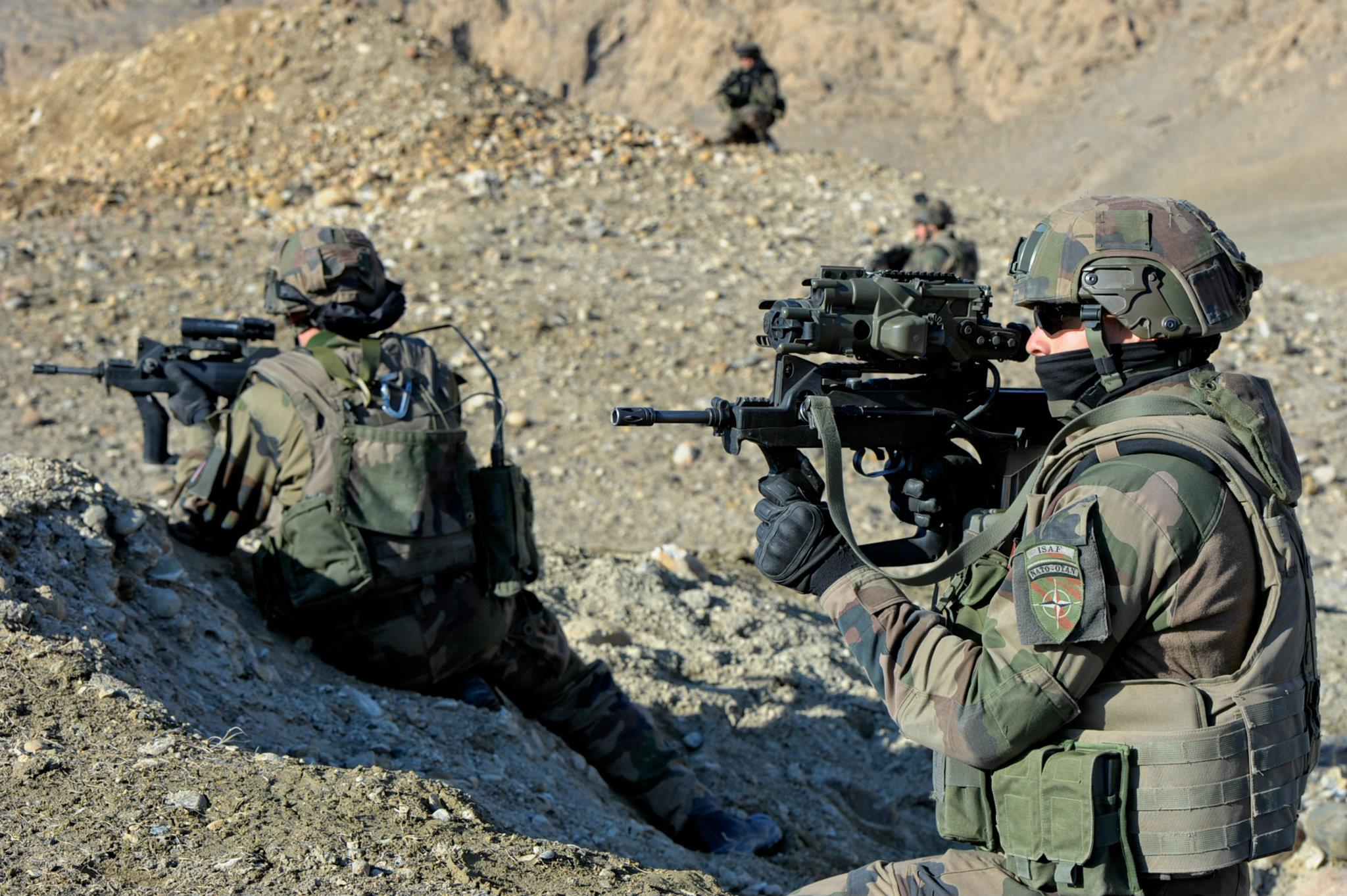
Félin system (1er régiment d'infanterie)

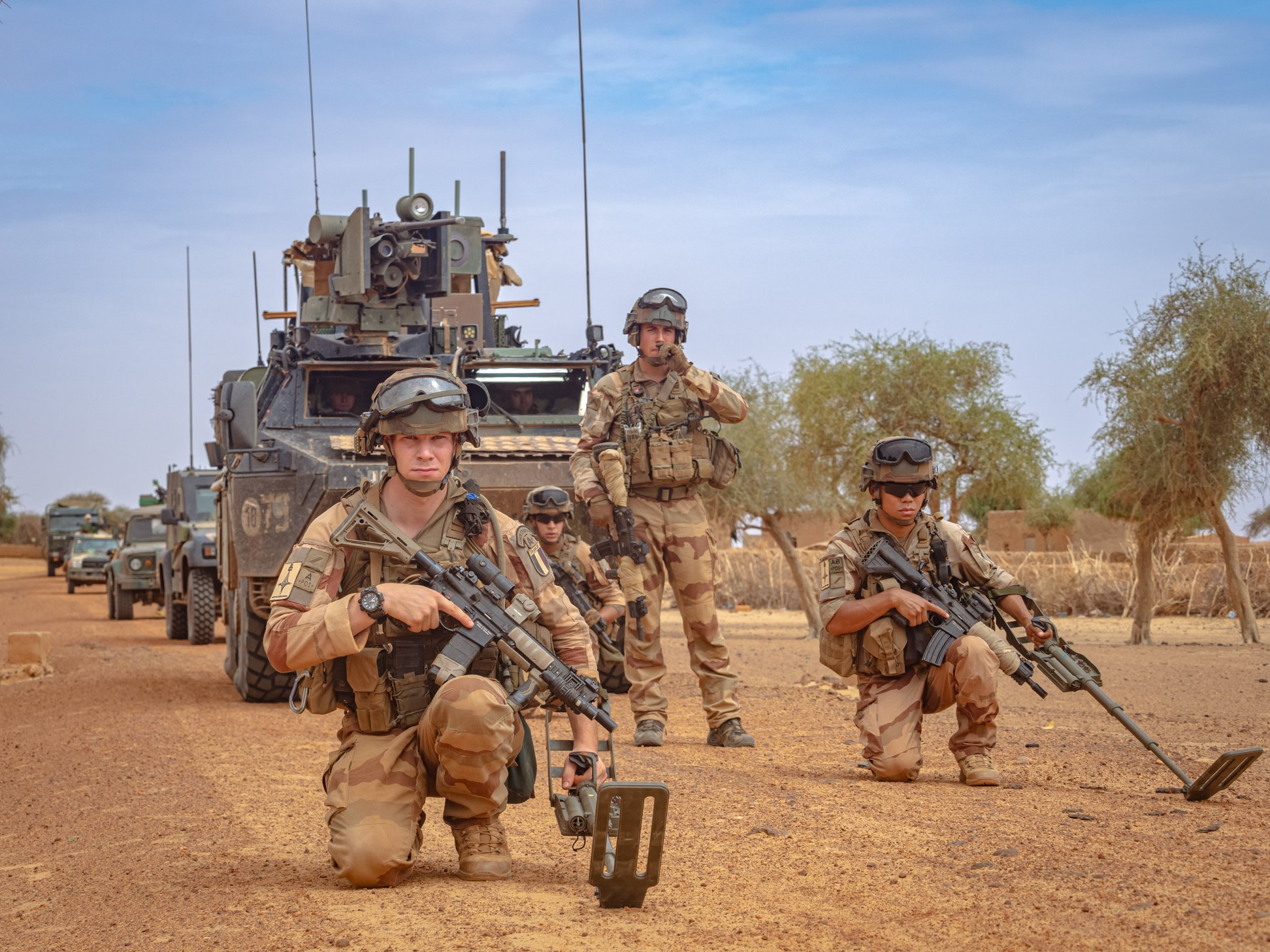
Sappers (2e régiment étranger de génie)

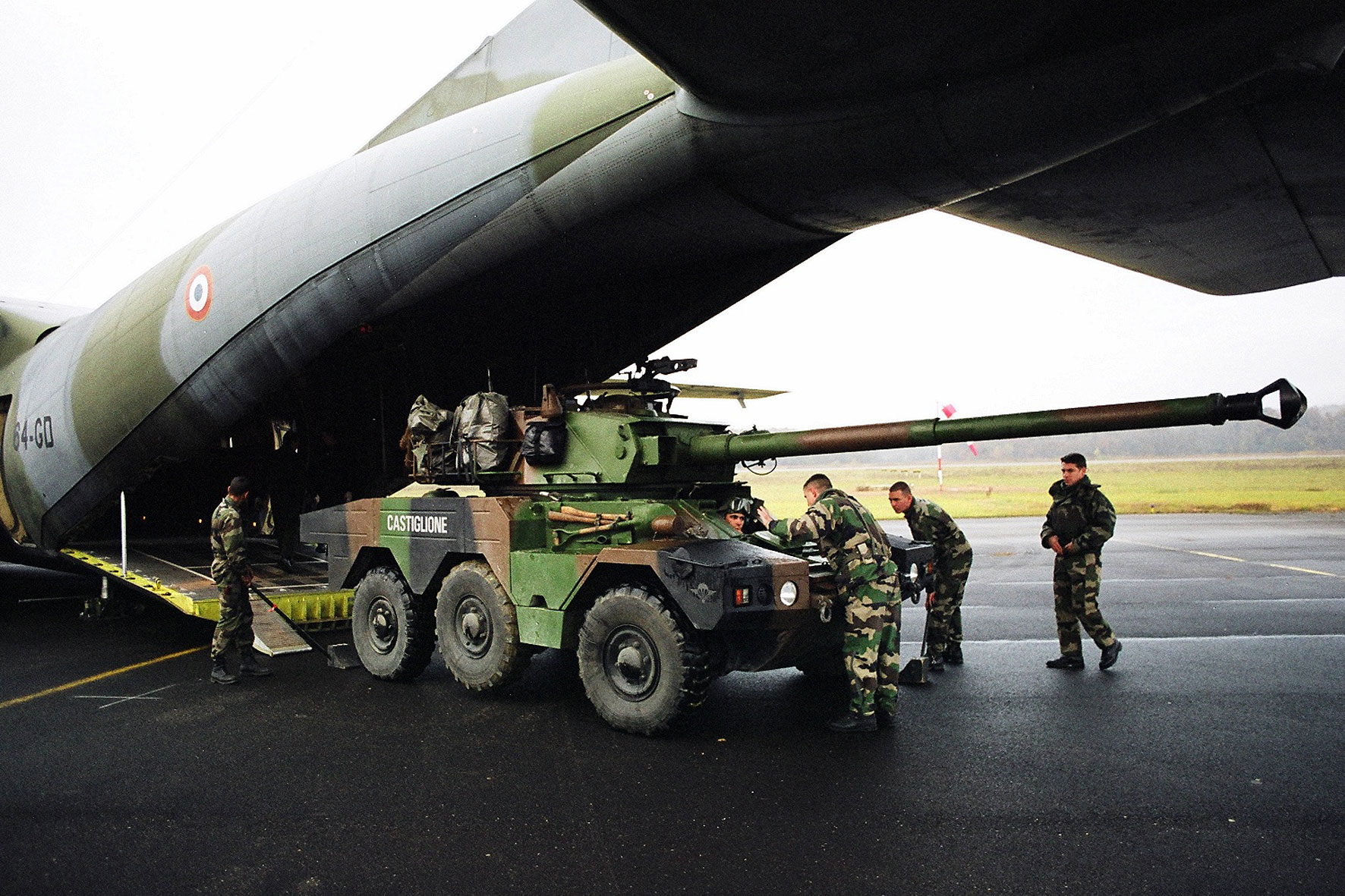
Aerotransport ERC90 (1er régiment de hussards parachutistes)

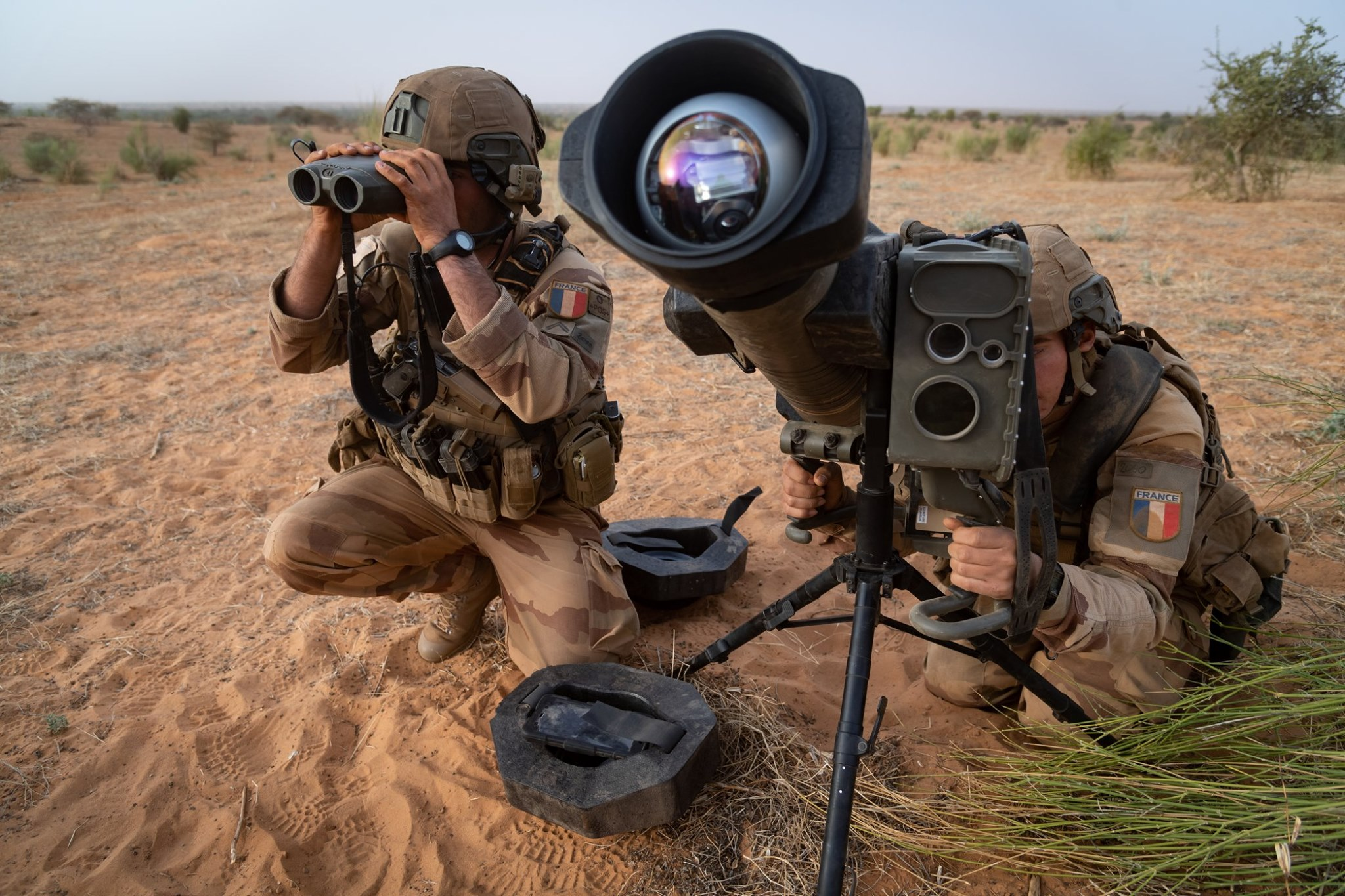
Vector 21 and Akeron MP (Opération Barkhane)

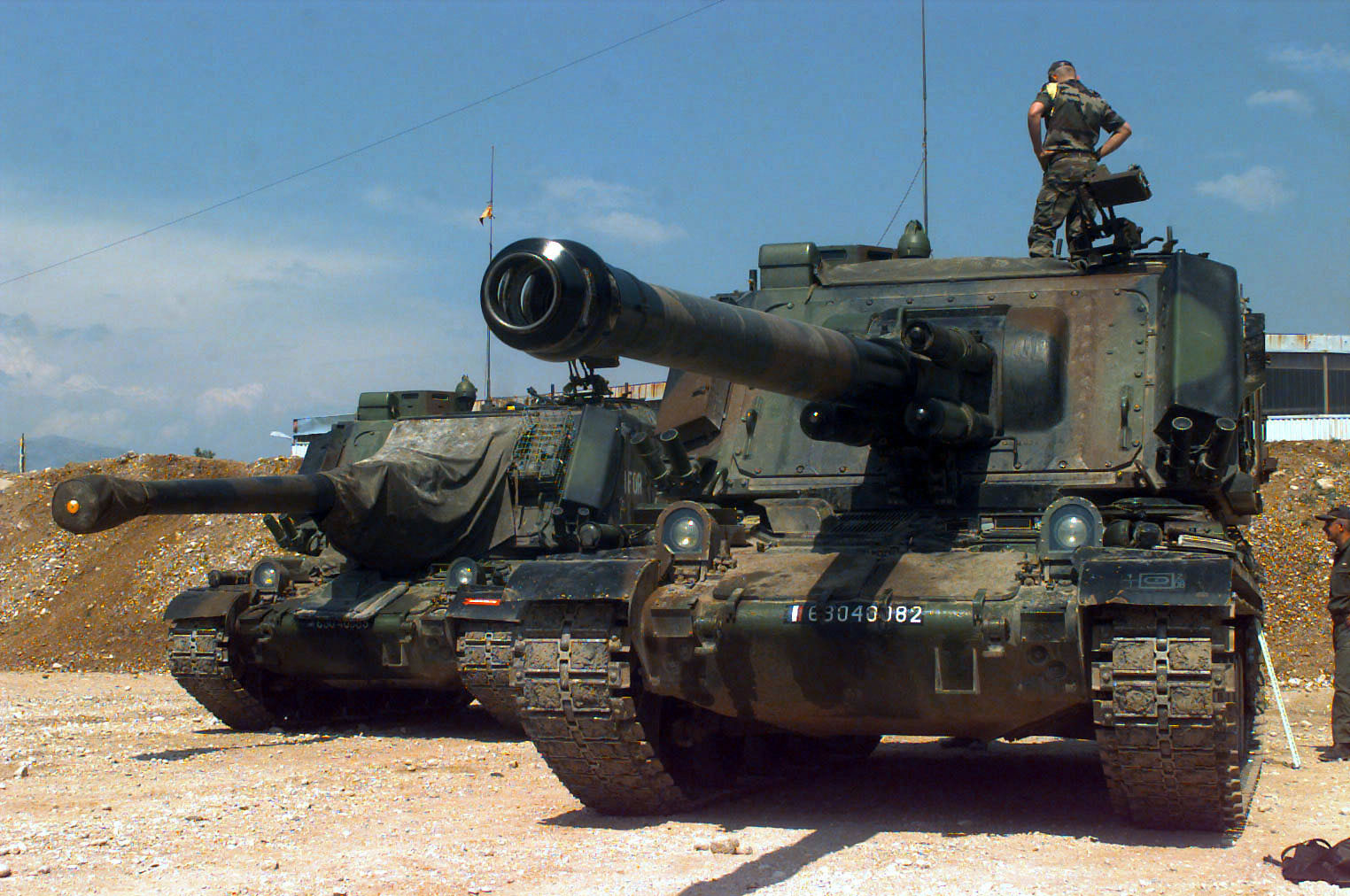
AMX AuF1 artillery system (40e régiment d'artillerie)

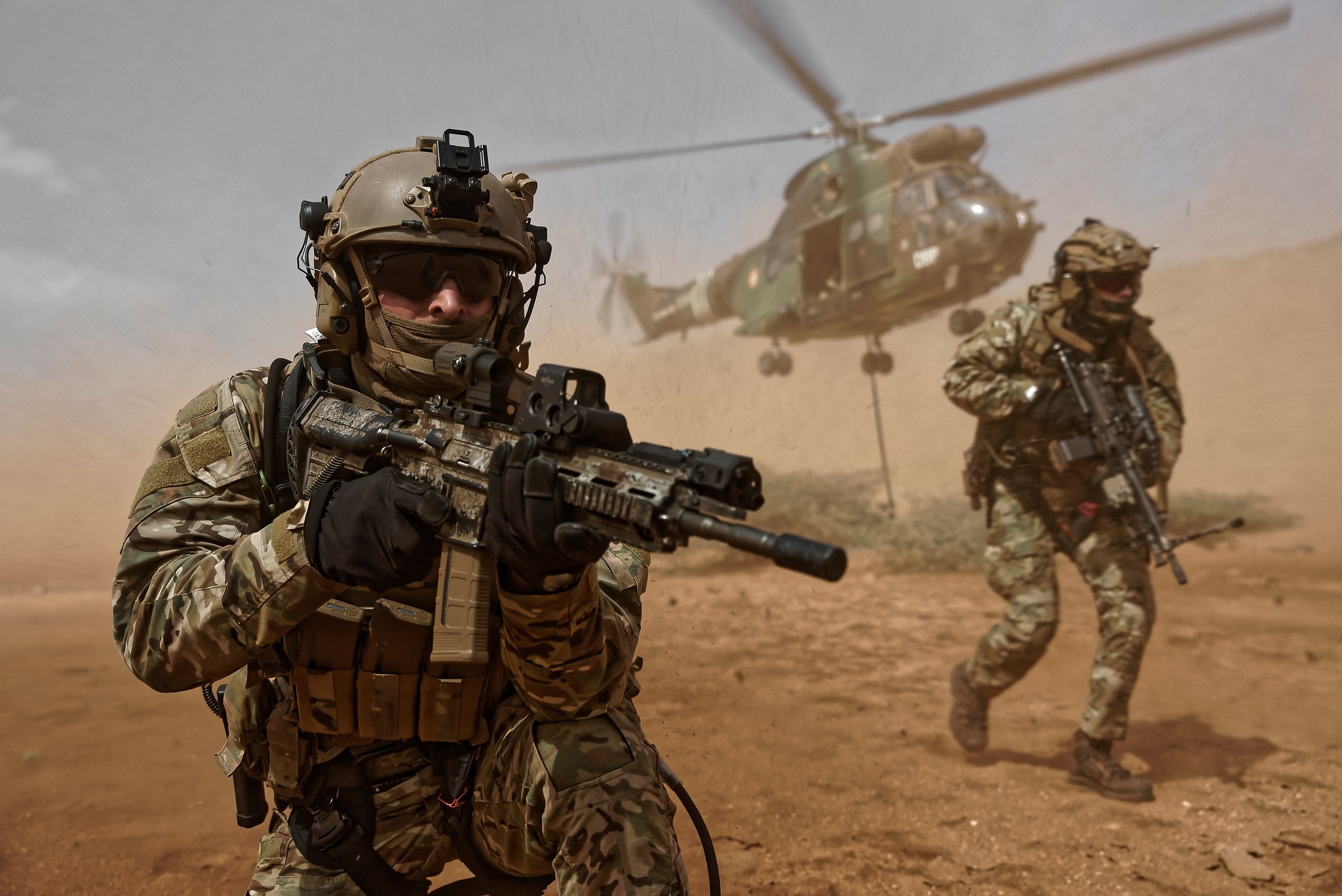
Aérospatiale SA 330 Puma (13e régiment de dragons parachutistes)

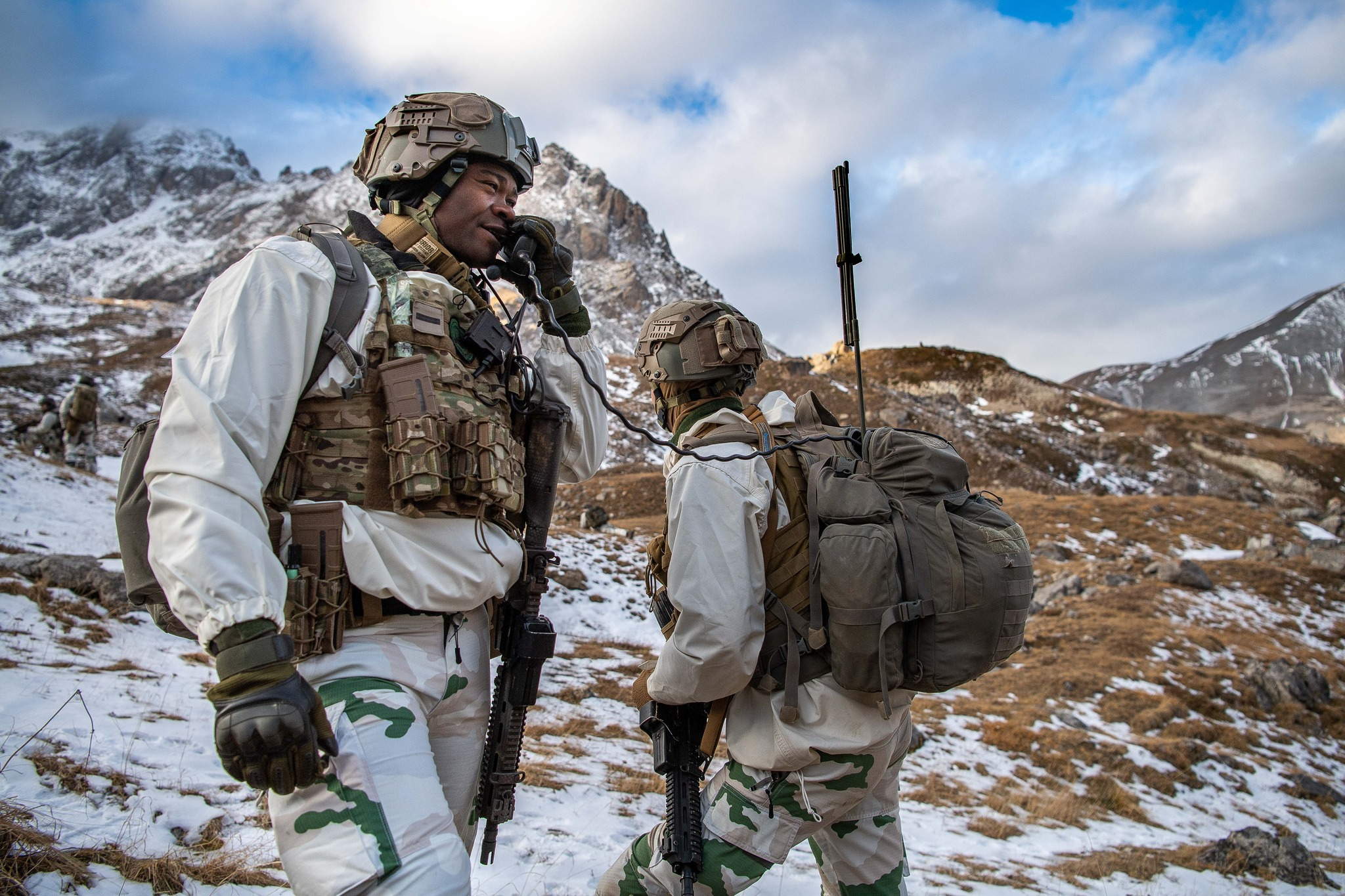
F3 ballistic helmet (27th Mountain Infantry Brigade)

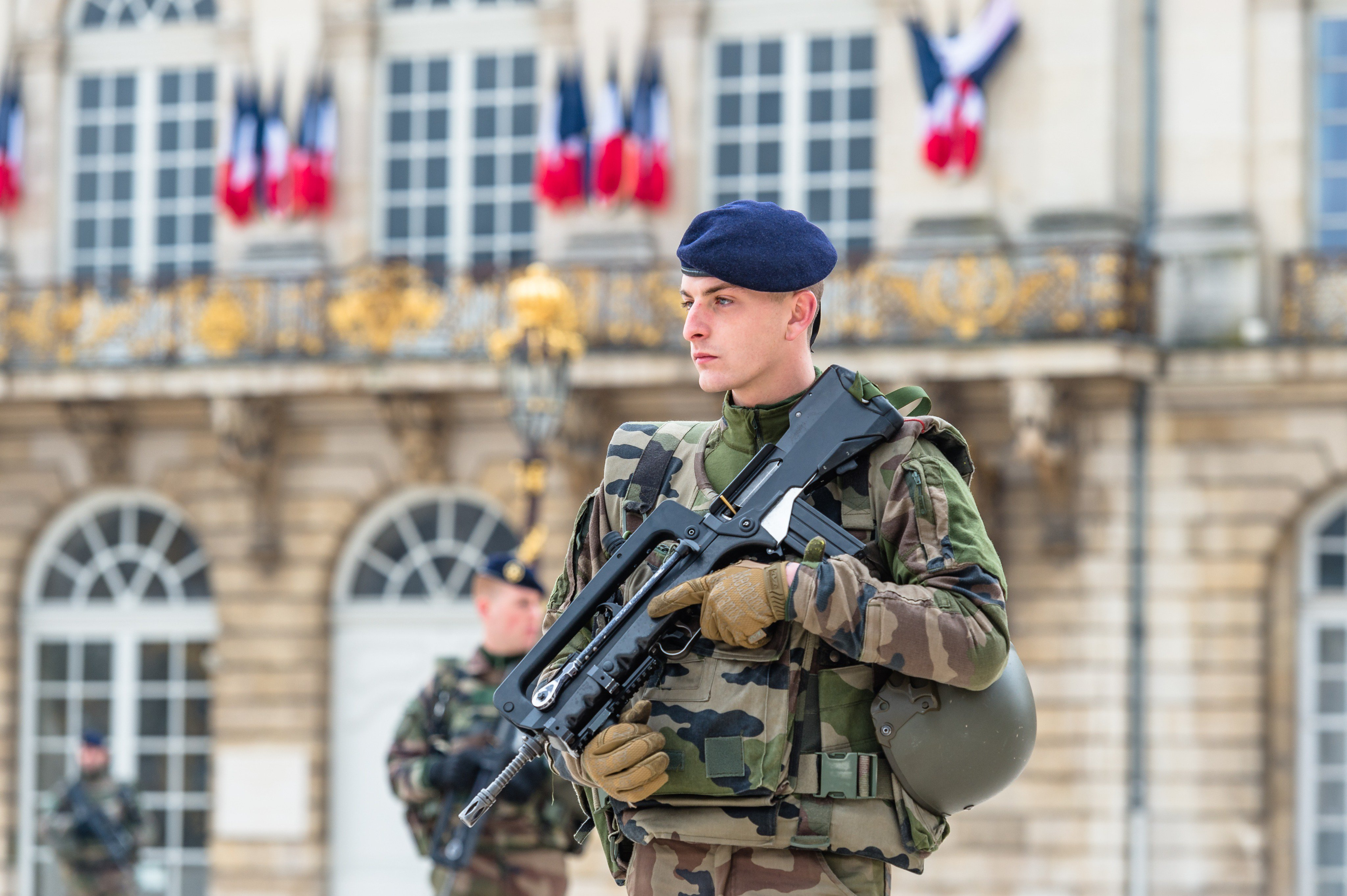
FAMAS F1 rifle (Opération Sentinelle)

== Uniforms ==
In the 1970s, France adopted a light beige dress uniform which is worn with coloured kepis, sashes, fringed epaulettes, fourragères and other traditional items on appropriate occasions. The most commonly worn parade dress, however, consists of camouflage uniforms worn with the dress items noted above. The camouflage pattern, officially called Camouflage Centre Europe (CE), draws heavily on the colouration incorporated into the US M81 woodland pattern, but with a thicker and heavier striping. A desert version called the Camouflage Daguet has been worn since the Gulf War which consists of large irregular areas of chestnut brown and light grey on a sand khaki base.

The legionnaires of the Foreign Legion wear white kepis, blue sashes, and green and red epaulettes as dress uniform, while the Troupes de marine wear blue and red kepis and yellow epaulettes. The pioneers of the Foreign Legion wear the basic legionnaire uniform but with leather aprons and gloves. The Chasseurs Alpins wear a large beret, known as the "tarte" (the pie) with dark blue or white mountain outfits. The Spahis retain the long white cloak or "burnous" of the regiment's origin as North African cavalry.

The military cadets of Saint-Cyr and the École Polytechnique retain their late 19th century dress uniforms. A dark blue/black evening dress is authorized for officers and individual branches or regiments may parade bands or "fanfares" in historic dress dating as far back as the Napoleonic period.

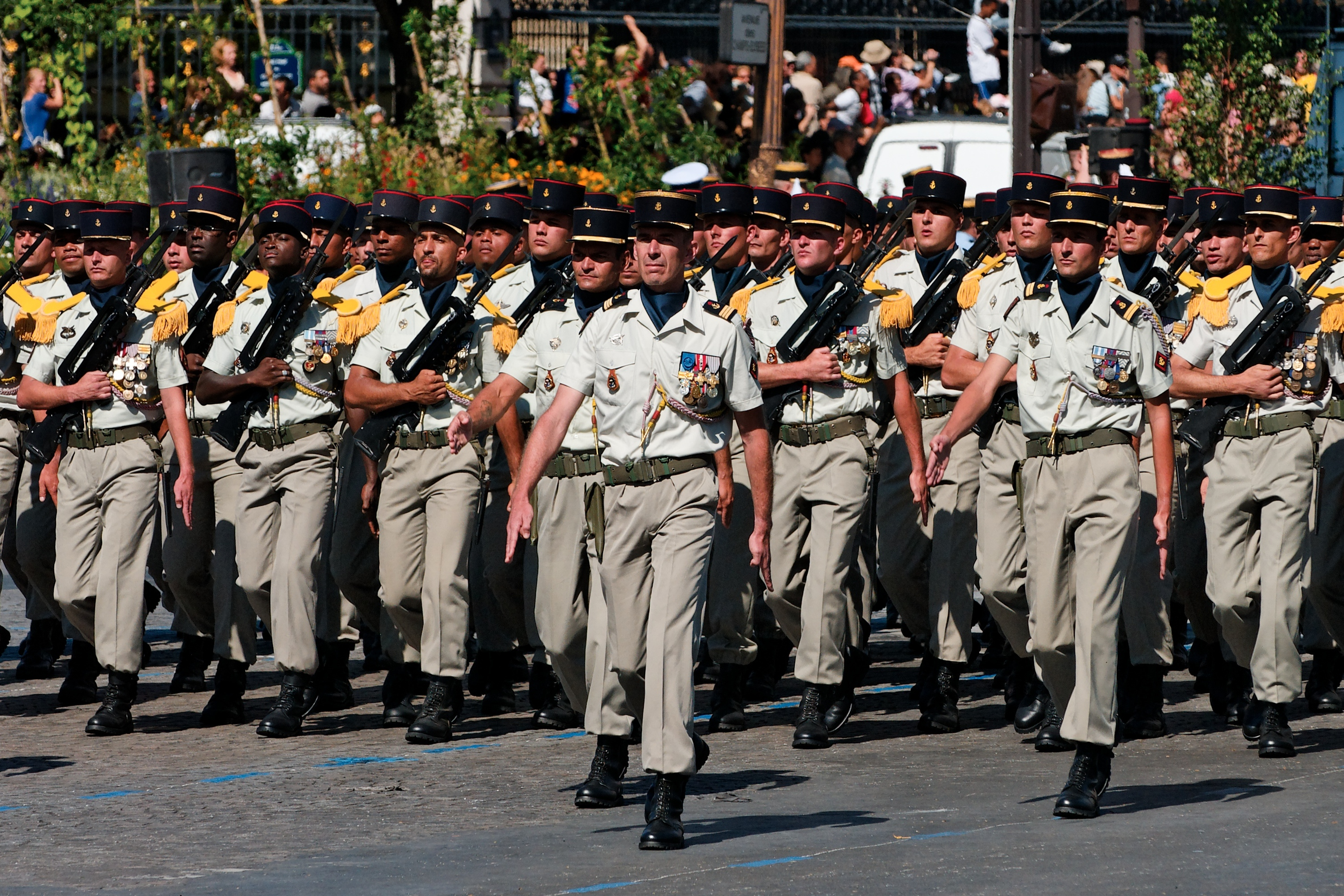
Members of 21e RIMA in parade formation

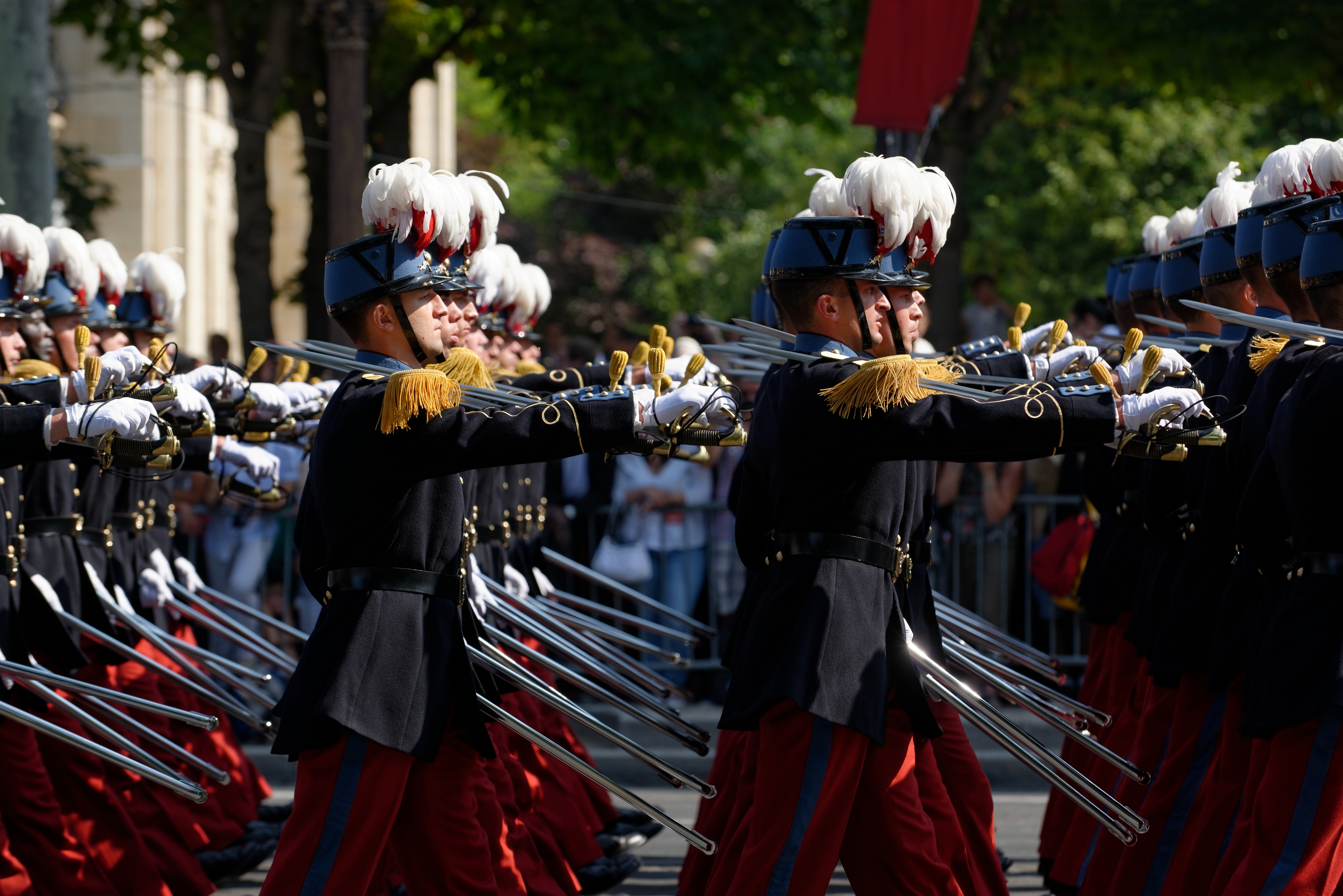
Officers during military parade on the Champs-Élysées, Paris

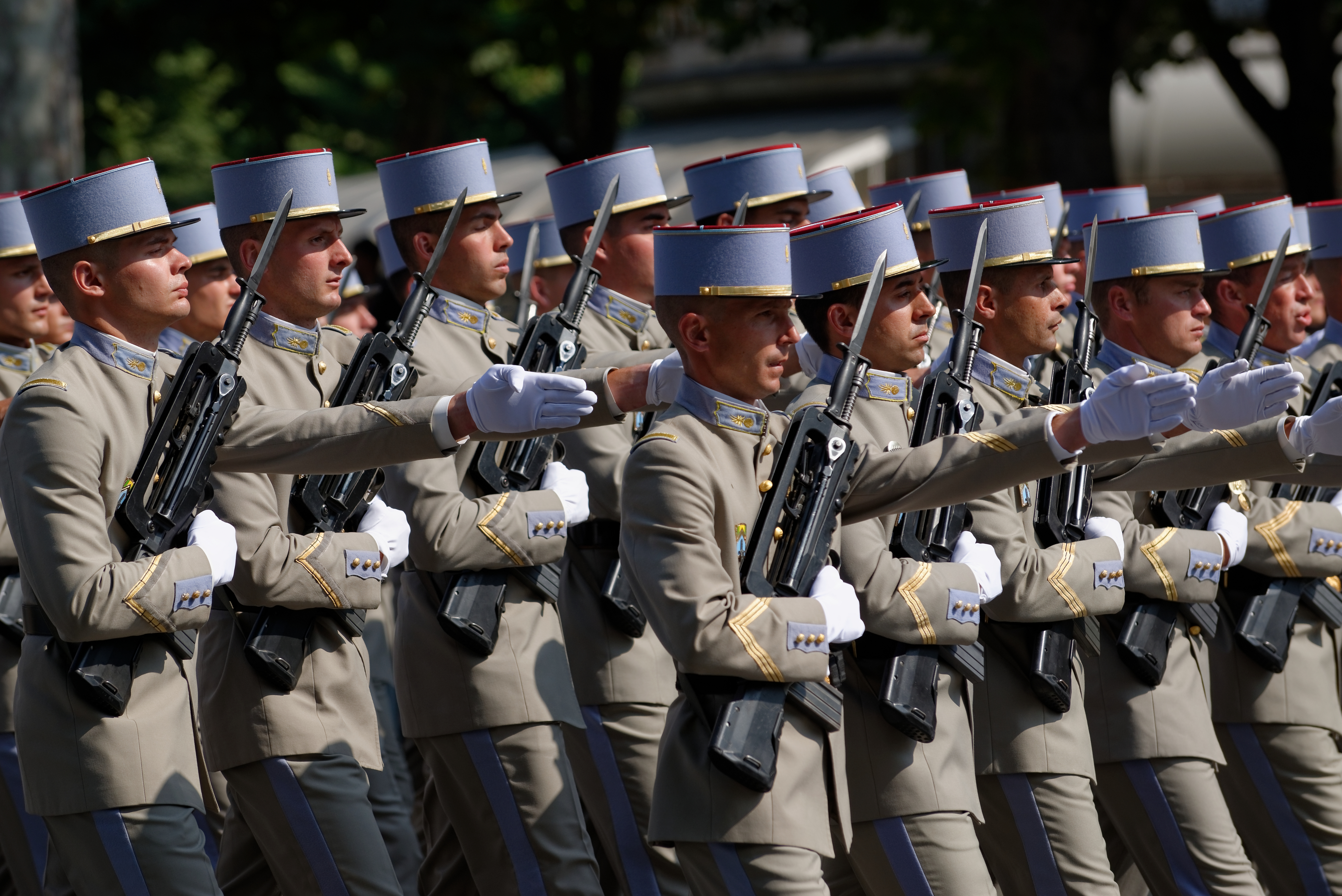
Ceremonial parade for the commemoration of 8 May 1945

== See also ==
- Grand Quartier Général
- National Office for Veterans and Victims of War
- List of military weapons of France

== Bibliography ==
- Clayton, Anthony (1988). France, Soldiers, and Africa. Brassey's Defence Publishers.
- Clayton, Anthony (1994). The Wars of French Decolonization.
- de la Gorce, Paul-Marie (1963). The French Army: A Military-Political History.
- Dupuy, Trevor N. (1993). Harper Encyclopaedia of Military History.
- Ferguson, Niall (2001). The Cash Nexus: Money and Power in the Modern World, 1700–2000.
- Galliac, Paul (2012). L' Armee Francaise. Histoire & Collections. ISBN 978-2-35250-195-4.
- IISS (2020). The Military Balance 2020. Routledge. ISBN 978-0367466398.
- Isby, David C.; Kamps, Charles T. (1985). Armies of NATO's Central Front. Jane's Information Group. ISBN 0-7106-0341-X.
- Pichichero, Christy (2018). The Military Enlightenment: War and Culture in the French Empire from Louis XIV to Napoleon.
