= Grand Quartier Général =

The Grand Quartier Général (GQG or Grand QG) was the wartime general headquarters of the French Army. There were two separate instances and a modern usage of the term:

- Grand Quartier Général (1914–1919) during World War I.
- Grand Quartier Général (1939–1940) during World War II.
- Grand Quartier Général des Puissances Alliées en Europe is the French name for the Supreme Headquarters Allied Powers Europe.
