= Défense opérationnelle du territoire =

In France, the Operational Defence of the Territory (Défense opérationnelle du territoire, DOT) is according to the Code of Defence, the participation of the French Armed Forces "To maintain the freedom and continuity of action of the Government, as well as to safeguard the organs essential to the defense of the nation."

The integrated civil-military concept was first put in place in 1959. It is defined as the mission entrusted to the Armed Forces on French territory:

- Protection of military installations at all times
- Ensure the protection of the national territory and oppose a possible enemy inside it
- Organize military resistance operations in the event of an invasion.

During the Cold War, in addition to being a concept, it was a command, for some years, being disbanded in the 1970s. In 1984, Isby and Kamps wrote that the Défense Opérationnelle du Territoire term remained in use despite the command having been disbanded in the 1970s.

== Cold War structure ==
information is circa 1989

=== 1st Military Region ===
- Headquarters Paris
  - GMR 1 (Saint-Germain-en-Laye)
  - 101RT (Montlhï¿½ry)
  - 6^{e} Régiment de Chasseurs (Réserve) (6^{e} RCh), Rambouillet, (with AML-60 and AML-90)
  - 12^{e} Régiment de Dragons (Réserve) (12^{e} RD), Orléans, (with AML-60 and AML-90)
  - 5^{e} Régiment du Génie (Réserve) (5^{e} RG), Versailles
  - 1^{er} Groupe d’Hélicoptères Légers, Les Mureaux
  - 102e Brigade de Zone (Réserve) (102e BZ), Saint-Germain-en-Laye
    - 102^{e} Régiment de Commandement et de Soutien (102^{e} RCS), Versailles
    - 8e Régiment de Chasseurs (8e RCh), Olivet, (with AML-60 and AML-90)
    - 70e Régiment d'Infanterie de Marine (70^{e} RIMa), Montlhéry
    - 93e Régiment d'Infanterie (93e RI), Beynes
    - 152^{e} Compagnie du Génie (152e CG), Versailles
    - 162^{e} Compagnie du Génie (162e CG), Versailles
  - 12e Division Militaire Territoriale (Versailles)
  - 54e Régiment d'Infanterie de Marine (Réserve) (54e RIMa), Pontoise
  - CM 5 (Pontoise) - CM 421 (Les-Lilas)
  - 13e Division Militaire Territoriale (Tours)
    - 32e Régiment (RCD) (Le-Ruchard)
    - CM 32 (Le-Ruchard) - CM 90 (Chateauroux) - CM 108 (Pannes)

=== 2nd Military Region ===
- 2^{e} Région militaire (2^{e} RM), Lille
  - 5^{e} Régiment de Hussards (Réserve) (5^{e} RH), Laon, (with AML-60 and AML-90)
  - 28^{e} Régiment d’Infanterie (Réserve) (28^{e} RI), Évreux
  - 33^{e} Régiment d’Infanterie (Réserve) (33^{e} RI), Saint-Omer
  - 73^{e} Régiment d’Infanterie (Réserve) (73^{e} RI), Aire-sur-la-Lys
  - 84^{e} Régiment d’Infanterie (Réserve) (84^{e} RI), Cambrai
  - 127^{e} Régiment d’Infanterie (Réserve) (127^{e} RI), Laon
  - 2^{e} Régiment de Transmission de Zone de Défense (Réserve), (2^{e} RTZD), Lille
  - 52^{e} Régiment de Transmission, (52^{e} RT), Lille
  - 102^{e} Régiment du Train de Zone (Réserve)(102^{e} RTZ), Arras
  - Bataillon des canonniers sédentaires (Réserve) Lille, (Bofors 40 mm gun)
  - 2^{e} Groupe d’Hélicoptères Légers, Dax
  - 108^{e} Brigade de Zone (108^{e} BZ), Amiens
    - 108^{e} Régiment de Commandement et de Soutien (108^{e} RCS), Amiens
    - 18^{e} Régiment de Chasseurs (18^{e} RCh), Arras, (with AML-60 and AML-90)
    - 45^{e} Régiment d'Infanterie (45^{e} RI), Soissons
    - 87^{e} Régiment d'Infanterie (87^{e} RI), Sissonne
    - 158^{e} Compagnie du Génie (158e CG), Oissel
    - 168^{e} Compagnie du Génie (168e CG), Oissel
  - 21^{e} Circonscription Militaire de Défense
    - 243^{e} Régiment d'Infanterie (Réserve) (243^{e} RI), Lille
  - 22^{e} Circonscription Militaire de Défense
    - 54^{e} Régiment d'Infanterie (Réserve) (54^{e} RI), Noyon
  - 23^{e} Circonscription Militaire de Défense
    - 239^{e} Régiment d'Infanterie (Réserve) (239^{e} RI), Rouen

=== 3rd Military Region ===
- 3^{e} Région militaire (3^{e} RM), Rennes
  - 41^{e} Régiment d'Infanterie (41^{e} RI), Châteaulin (70x VAB)
  - 19^{e} Régiment d’Infanterie (Réserve) (19^{e} RI), Brest
  - 77^{e} Régiment d’Infanterie (Réserve) (77^{e} RI), Fontevraud-l'Abbaye
  - 115^{e} Régiment d’Infanterie (Réserve) (115^{e} RI), Thorée-les-Pins
  - 118^{e} Régiment d’Infanterie (Réserve) (118^{e} RI), Châteaulin
  - 125^{e} Régiment d’Infanterie (Réserve) (125^{e} RI), Poitiers
  - 21^{e} Régiment du Génie (Réserve) (21^{e} RG), Angers
  - 3^{e} Régiment de Transmission de Zone de Défense (Réserve), (3^{e} RTZD), Laval
  - 38^{e} Régiment de Transmission, (38^{e} RT), Laval
  - 103^{e} Régiment du Train de Zone (Réserve)(103^{e} RTZ), La Rochelle
  - 504^{e} Groupe Antiaérien Léger (Réserve) (504^{e} GAL), Tourouvre, (Bofors 40 mm gun)
  - 3^{e} Groupe d’Hélicoptères Légers, Saint-Jacques-de-la-Lande
  - 109^{e} Brigade de Zone (Réserve) (109^{e} BZ), Saint-Malo
    - 109^{e} Régiment de Commandement et de Soutien (109^{e} RCS), Dinan
    - 19^{e} Régiment de Dragons (19^{e} RD), Vannes, (with AML-60 and AML-90)
    - 62^{e} Régiment d'Infanterie (62^{e} RI), Vannes
    - 117^{e} Régiment d'Infanterie (117^{e} RI), Le Mans
    - 159^{e} Compagnie du Génie (159e CG), Angers
    - 169^{e} Compagnie du Génie (169e CG), Angers
  - 31^{e} Circonscription Militaire de Défense
    - 48^{e} Régiment d'Infanterie (Réserve) (48^{e} RI), Guingamp
  - 32^{e} Circonscription Militaire de Défense
    - 2^{e} Régiment d'Infanterie (Réserve) (2^{e} RI), Caen
  - 33^{e} Circonscription Militaire de Défense
    - 137^{e} Régiment d'Infanterie (Réserve) (137^{e} RI), Fontenay-le-Comte

=== 4th Military Region ===
- 4^{e} Région militaire (4^{e} RM), Bordeaux
  - 49^{e} Régiment d'Infanterie (Réserve) (49^{e} RI), Bayonne
  - 50^{e} Régiment d’Infanterie (Réserve) (50^{e} RI), Périgueux
  - 63^{e} Régiment d’Infanterie (Réserve) (63^{e} RI), Limoges
  - 83^{e} Régiment d’Infanterie (Réserve) (83^{e} RI), Toulouse
  - 88^{e} Régiment d’Infanterie (Réserve) (88^{e} RI), Auch
  - 17^{e} Régiment d'Artillerie (Training) (17^{e} RA), Biscarrosse, (Bofors 40 mm gun)
  - 31^{e} Régiment du Génie (Réserve) (31^{e} RG), Castelsarrasin
  - 4^{e} Régiment de Transmission de Zone de Défense (Réserve), (4^{e} RTZD), Bordeaux
  - 48^{e} Régiment de Transmission, (48^{e} RT), Bordeaux
  - 104^{e} Régiment du Train de Zone (Réserve)(104^{e} RTZ), Brie
  - 4^{e} Groupe d’Hélicoptères Légers, Martignas-sur-Jalle
  - 115^{e} Brigade de Zone (Réserve) (115^{e} BZ), Limoges
    - 115^{e} Régiment de Commandement et de Soutien (115^{e} RCS), Limoges
    - 9^{e} Régiment de Chasseurs (9^{e} RCh), Périgueux, (with AML-60 and AML-90)
    - 18^{e} Régiment d'Infanterie (18^{e} RI), Pau
    - 34^{e} Régiment d'Infanterie (34^{e} RI), Mont-de-Marsan
    - 165^{e} Compagnie du Génie (165e CG), Castelsarrasin
    - 175^{e} Compagnie du Génie (175e CG), Castelsarrasin
  - 41^{e} Circonscription Militaire de Défense
    - 144^{e} Régiment d'Infanterie (Réserve) (144^{e} RI), Martignas-sur-Jalle
  - 42^{e} Circonscription Militaire de Défense
    - 107^{e} Régiment d'Infanterie (Réserve) (107^{e} RI), Angoulême
  - 43^{e} Circonscription Militaire de Défense
    - 100^{e} Régiment d'Infanterie (Réserve) (100^{e} RI), Brive-la-Gaillarde
  - 44^{e} Circonscription Militaire de Défense
    - 15^{e} Régiment d'Infanterie (Réserve) (15^{e} RI), Castres

=== 5th Military Region ===
- 5^{e} Région militaire (5^{e} RM), Lyon
  - 8^{e} Régiment d'Infanterie de Marine (Réserve) (8^{e} RIMa), Tarascon
  - 16^{e} Régiment d’Infanterie (Réserve) (16^{e} RI), Clermont-Ferrand
  - 38^{e} Régiment d’Infanterie (Réserve) (38^{e} RI), Saint-Étienne
  - 52^{e} Régiment d’Infanterie (Réserve) (52^{e} RI), Sathonay
  - 53^{e} Régiment d’Infanterie (Réserve) (53^{e} RI), Lunel
  - 112^{e} Régiment d’Infanterie (Réserve) (112^{e} RI), La Valette
  - 121^{e} Régiment d’Infanterie (Réserve) (121^{e} RI), Moulins
  - 15^{e} Bataillon de Chasseurs Alpins (Réserve)(15e BCA), Barcelonnette
  - 22^{e} Bataillon de Chasseurs Alpins (Réserve)(22e BCA), Briançon
  - 53^{e} Bataillon de Chasseurs Alpins (Réserve)(53e BCA), Chambéry
  - 5^{e} Régiment de Transmission de Zone de Défense (Réserve), (5^{e} RTZD), Montélimar
  - 45^{e} Régiment de Transmission, (45^{e} RT), Montélimar
  - 105^{e} Régiment du Train de Zone (Réserve)(105^{e} RTZ), Vienne
  - 506^{e} Groupe Antiaérien Léger (Réserve) (506^{e} GAL), Hyères, (Bofors 40 mm gun)
  - 5^{e} Groupe d’Hélicoptères Légers, Lyon
  - 24^{e} Bataillon du Matériel, (24^{e} BMAT), Saint-Priest
  - 127^{e} Brigade de Zone (Réserve) (127^{e} BZ), Grenoble
    - 127^{e} Régiment de Commandement et de Soutien (127^{e} RCS), Grenoble
    - 13^{e} Régiment de Chasseurs (13^{e} RCh), Gap, (with AML-60 and AML-90)
    - 67^{e} Bataillon de Chasseurs Alpins (67e BCA)
    - 140^{e} Régiment d'Infanterie Alpine (140^{e} RIA), Varces
    - 177^{e} Compagnie du Génie (177e CG), Avignon
    - 187^{e} Compagnie du Génie (187e CG), Avignon
  - 51^{e} Circonscription Militaire de Défense
    - 299^{e} Régiment d'Infanterie (Réserve) (299^{e} RI), Sathonay
  - 52^{e} Circonscription Militaire de Défense
    - 292^{e} Régiment d'Infanterie (Réserve) (292^{e} RI), Clermont-Ferrand
  - 53^{e} Circonscription Militaire de Défense
    - 141^{e} Régiment d'Infanterie (Réserve) (141^{e} RI), La Valette
  - 54^{e} Circonscription Militaire de Défense
    - 142^{e} Régiment d'Infanterie (Réserve) (142^{e} RI), Béziers
  - 55^{e} Circonscription Militaire de Défense
    - 173^{e} Régiment d'Infanterie (Réserve) (173^{e} RI), Bastia
    - 373^{e} Régiment d'Infanterie (Réserve) (373^{e} RI), Ajaccio

=== 6th Military Region ===
- 6^{e} Région militaire (6^{e} RM), Metz
  - 56^{e} Régiment d’Infanterie (Réserve) (56^{e} RI), Digoin
  - 69^{e} Régiment d’Infanterie (Réserve) (69^{e} RI), Pont-Sainte-Marie
  - 79^{e} Régiment d’Infanterie (Réserve) (79^{e} RI), Saint-Avold
  - 89^{e} Régiment d’Infanterie (Réserve) (89^{e} RI), Sens
  - 133^{e} Régiment d’Infanterie (Réserve) (133^{e} RI), Bourg-en-Bresse
  - 59^{e} Régiment d'Artillerie (Réserve) (59^{e} RA), Colmar, (Bofors 40 mm gun)
  - 6^{e} Régiment de Transmission de Zone de Défense (Réserve), (6^{e} RTZD), Montigny-lès-Metz
  - 43^{e} Régiment de Transmission, (43^{e} RT), Montigny-lès-Metz
  - 106^{e} Régiment du Train de Zone (Réserve)(106^{e} RTZ), Ecrouves
  - 6^{e} Groupe d’Hélicoptères Légers, Dax
  - 107^{e} Brigade de Zone (Réserve) (107^{e} BZ), Besançon
    - 107^{e} Régiment de Commandement et de Soutien (107^{e} RCS), Besançon
    - 10^{e} Régiment de Chasseurs (10^{e} RCh), Lunéville, (with AML-60 and AML-90)
    - 23^{e} Régiment d'Infanterie (23^{e} RI), Les Rousses
    - 149^{e} Régiment d'Infanterie (149^{e} RI), Lunéville
    - 157^{e} Compagnie du Génie (67e CG), Besançon
    - 167^{e} Compagnie du Génie (167e CG), Besançon
  - 110^{e} Brigade de Zone (Réserve) (110^{e} BZ), Châlons-en-Champagne
    - 110^{e} Régiment de Commandement et de Soutien (110^{e} RCS), Chalons sur Marne
    - 15^{e} Régiment de Chasseurs (15^{e} RCh), Thierville-sur-Meuse, (with AML-60 and AML-90)
    - 41^{e} Groupe de Chasseurs (41^{e} GC), Reims
    - 164^{e} Régiment d'Infanterie (164^{e} RI), Verdun
    - 160^{e} Compagnie du Génie (160e CG), Charleville-Mézières
    - 170^{e} Compagnie du Génie (170e CG), Charleville-Mézières
  - 61^{e} Circonscription Militaire de Défense
    - 26^{e} Régiment d'Infanterie (Réserve) (26^{e} RI), Pont-Saint-Vincent
  - 62^{e} Circonscription Militaire de Défense
    - 37^{e} Régiment d'Infanterie (Réserve) (37^{e} RI), Sarrebourg
  - 63^{e} Circonscription Militaire de Défense
    - 106^{e} Régiment d'Infanterie (Réserve) (106^{e} RI), Sedan
  - 64^{e} Circonscription Militaire de Défense
    - 10^{e} Régiment d'Infanterie (Réserve) (10^{e} RI), Digoin
  - 65^{e} Circonscription Militaire de Défense
    - 60^{e} Régiment d'Infanterie (Réserve) (60^{e} RI), Valdahon

== See also ==
- Military reserve
- National Territory Land Command (France) (post-Cold War equivalent, from 2016)
