= Structure of the French Army =

The structure of the French Army is fixed by Chapter 2 of Title II of Book II of the Third Part of the Code of Defense, notably resulting in the codification of Decree 2000-559 of 21 June 2000.

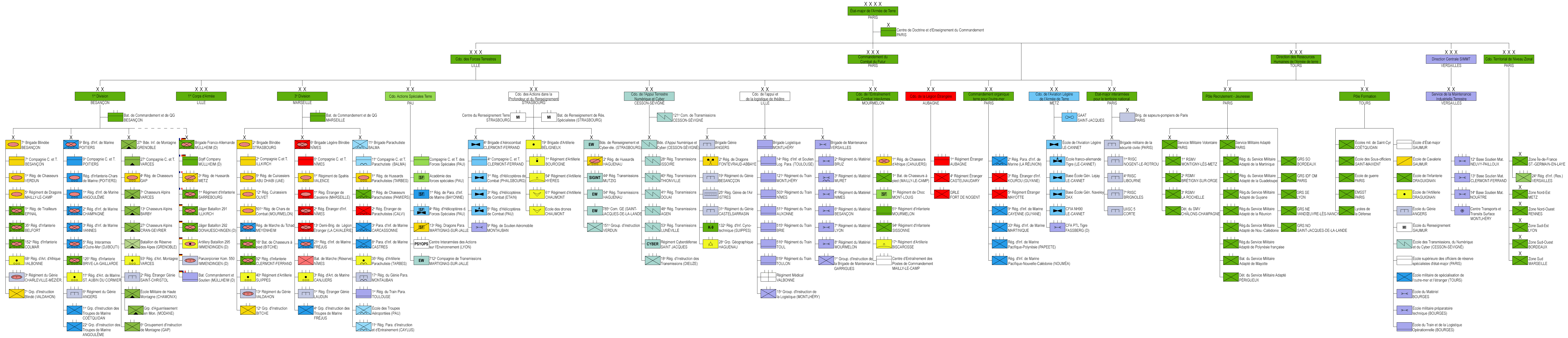
Structure of the French Army as of September 2025.

== Army General Staff ==
The Army General Staff is headquartered in Paris.

- État-major de l'Armée de terre - Army General Staff, in Paris
  - Inspection de l'Armée de terre (IAT) - Army Inspection
- Commandement du Combat du Futur (CCF) - Future Combat Command
  - Section technique de l'Armée de terre (STAT) - Army Technical Section, in Versailles
    - Groupement aéromobilité de la section technique de l'Armée de terre (GAMSTAT) - Army Technical Section Airmobile Group, in Chabeuil

=== Army Light Aviation Command ===
Badge of the COM ALAT.

- Commandement de l'Aviation légère de l’Armée de terre (COM ALAT) - Army Light Aviation Command, in Metz
  - Groupe avions de l'Armée de terre (GAAT) - Army Planes Group, in Saint-Jacques-de-la-Lande
  - École de l'Aviation légère de l’Armée de terre (EALAT) - Army Light Aviation School, in Le Cannet-des-Maures
    - Base École Général Lejay (BAGL) - School Base, in Le Cannet-des-Maures
    - Base École Général Naveley (BAGN) - School Base, in Dax
    - École franco-allemande de formation des équipages Tigre (EFA Tigre) - Franco-German Tiger Training School, in Le-Cannet-des-Maures
    - Centre de formation inter-armées NH90 (CFIA NH90) - NH90 Training Centre, in Le-Cannet-des-Maures
    - Centre de formation franco-allemand pour le personnel technico-logistique Tigre (CFA PTL), Franco-German Tiger Logistic Training Centre in Faßberg (Germany)

=== National Territory Joint Staff ===
The National Territory Joint Staff is headquartered in Paris and tasked with preparing for and providing support for operational deployments of the French Army on French national territory.

- État-major interarmées pour le territoire national (EMIA TN) - National Territory Joint Staff, in Paris
  - Brigade de sapeurs-pompiers de Paris (BSPP) - Paris Fire Brigade, in Paris
  - Brigade des militaires de la sécurité civile (BMSC) - Military Civil Defense Brigade, in Paris
    - 1^{er} Régiment d'Instruction et d'Intervention de la Sécurité Civile (1^{e} RIISC) - 1st Civil Security Instruction and Intervention Regiment (Firefighting unit), in Nogent-le-Rotrou
    - 4^{e} Régiment d'Instruction et d'Intervention de la Sécurité Civile (4^{e} RIISC) - 4th Civil Security Instruction and Intervention Regiment (Firefighting unit), in Libourne
    - Unité d'Instruction et d'Intervention de la Sécurité Civile no 5 (UIISC 5) - 5th Civil Security Instruction and Intervention Unit (Firefighting unit), in Corte
    - 7^{e} Régiment d'Instruction et d'Intervention de la Sécurité Civile (7^{e} RIISC) - 7th Civil Security Instruction and Intervention Regiment (Firefighting unit), in Brignoles

=== Foreign Legion Command ===
The Foreign Legion Command manages the Legion related-issues (recruitment, traditions, employment, training, security) and is headquartered in Aubagne.

- Commandement de la Légion Étrangère (COM LE) - Foreign Legion Command, in Aubagne
  - 1^{er} Régiment Étranger (1^{er} RE) - 1st Foreign Regiment, in Aubagne
  - 4^{e} Régiment Étranger (4^{e} RE) - 4th Foreign Regiment, in Castelnaudary
  - Groupement de Recrutement de la Légion Étrangère (GRLE) - Foreign Legion Recruiting Group (Flag and traditions of 11th Foreign Regiment), in Fort de Nogent

=== Organic Army Command for Overseas ===
- Commandement organique terre pour l'outre-mer (CORTOM), in Paris
  - 2^{e} Régiment de Parachutistes d'Infanterie de Marine (2^{e} RPIMa) - 2nd Marine Infantry Parachute Regiment, in La Réunion
  - 3^{e} Régiment Étranger d'Infanterie (3^{e} REI) - 3rd Foreign Infantry Regiment, in Kourou (French Guiana)
  - 5^{e} Régiment Étranger (5^{e} RE) - 5th Foreign Regiment, in Mayotte
  - 9^{e} Régiment d'Infanterie de Marine (9^{e} RIMa) - 9th Marine Infantry Regiment, in Cayenne (French Guiana)
  - 33^{e} Régiment d'Infanterie de Marine (33^{e} RIMa) - 33rd Marine Infantry Regiment, in Guadeloupe and Martinique
  - Régiment d'Infanterie de Marine du Pacifique - Nouvelle-Calédonie (RIMAP-NC) - Pacific Marine Infantry Regiment - New Caledonia, in Nouméa (New Caledonia)
  - Régiment d'Infanterie de Marine du Pacifique - Polynésie (RIMAP-P) - Pacific Marine Infantry Regiment - Polynesia, in Papeete (French Polynesia)

== Land Forces and Operations Command ==
The Commandement de la Force et des Opérations Terrestres (CFOT) - Land Forces and Operations Command has operational command of the army's combat forces and is headquartered in Lille.

- 1^{er} Corps d'Armée (1^{er} CA) - 1st Army Corps (France) in Lille
- Corps Européen (Détachement de Soutien National) - Eurocorps French National Support Detachment, in Strasbourg

=== 1st Division ===
- 1^{re} Division (1^{re} DIV) – 1st Division, in Besançon
  - Bataillon de Commandement et de Quartier Général (BCQG) - Command and Headquarters Battalion, in Besançon

==== 7th Armored Brigade ====
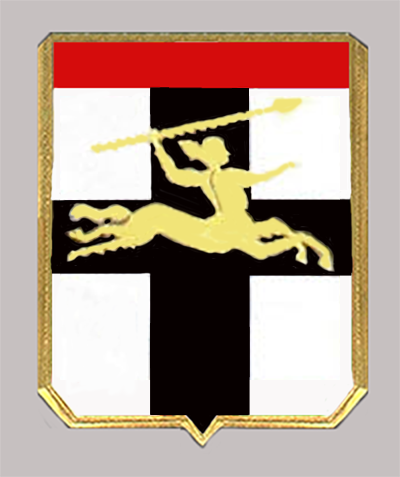
Badge of the 7th Armored Brigade

- 7^{e} Brigade Blindée (7^{e} BB) – 7th Armored Brigade, in Besançon
  - 7^{e} Compagnie de Commandement et de Transmissions Blindée (7^{e} CCTB) - 7th Armored Command and Signals Company (VAB), in Besançon
  - 1^{er} Régiment de Chasseurs (1^{er} RCh) - 1st Chasseurs Regiment (Leclerc MBTs, VBL vehicles), in Verdun
  - 5^{e} Régiment de Dragons (5^{e} RD) - 5th Dragoon Regiment (Leclerc MBTs, VBCI IFVs, VAB Génie, VBL vehicles), in Mailly-le-Camp
  - 1^{er} Régiment de Tirailleurs (1^{er} RTir) - 1st Tirailleur Regiment (VBCI IFVs), in Epinal
  - 35^{e} Régiment d'Infanterie (35^{e} RI) - 35th Infantry Regiment (VBCI IFVs), in Belfort
  - 152^{e} Régiment d'Infanterie (152^{e} RI) - 152nd Infantry Regiment (VBCI IFVs) in Colmar
  - 68^{e} Régiment d'Artillerie d'Afrique (68^{e} RAA) - 68th African Artillery Regiment (CAESAR howitzers, RTF1 mortars, Mistral missiles), in Valbonne
  - 3^{e} Régiment du Génie (3^{e} RG) - 3rd Engineer Regiment (VAB Génie), in Charleville-Mézières
  - 7^{e} Groupement d'Instruction Blindé (7^{e} GIB) - 7th Armored Instruction Group, in Valdahon

==== 9th Marine Infantry Brigade ====
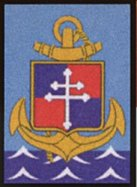
Badge of the 9th Marine Infantry Brigade

- 9^{e} Brigade d'Infanterie de Marine (9^{e} BIMa) - 9th Marine Infantry Brigade, in Poitiers
  - 9^{e} Compagnie de Commandement et de Transmissions de Marine (9^{e} CCTMa) - 9th Marine Command and Signals Company (VAB), in Poitiers
  - Régiment d'Infanterie-Chars de Marine (RICM) - Marine Infantry Tank Régiment (EBRC Jaguar vehicles), in Poitiers
  - 1^{er} Régiment d'Infanterie de Marine (1^{er} RIMa) - 1st Marine Infantry Regiment (AMX-10 RC, VAB, VBL vehicles, being replaced by EBRC Jaguar vehicles), in Angoulême
  - 2^{e} Régiment d'Infanterie de Marine (2^{e} RIMa) - 2nd Marine Infantry Regiment (VBCI IFVs), in Champagné
  - 3^{e} Régiment d'Infanterie de Marine (3^{e} RIMa) - 3rd Marine Infantry Regiment (VBMR Griffon), in Vannes
  - 5^{e} Régiment Interarmes d'Outre-mer (5^{ee} RIAOM) - 5th Overseas Interarms Regiment, in Djibouti City (Djibouti)
  - 126^{e} Régiment d'Infanterie (126^{e} RI) - 126th Infantry Regiment (VAB vehicles, being replaced by VBMR Griffon), in Brive-la-Gaillarde
  - 11^{e} Régiment d'Artillerie de Marine (11^{e} RAMa) - 11th Marine Artillery Regiment (CAESAR howitzers, RTF1 mortars, VBMR Griffon MEPAC mortar carriers, Mistral missiles), in Saint-Aubin-du-Cormier
  - 6^{e} Régiment du Génie (6^{e} RG) - 6th Engineer Regiment (VAB Génie), in Angers
  - 1^{er} Groupement d'Instruction des Troupes de Marine (1^{er} GITdM) - 1st Marine Instruction Group, in Coëtquidan
  - 22^{e} Groupement d'Instruction des Troupes de Marine (22^{e} GITdM) - 22nd Marine Instruction Group, in Angoulême

==== 27th Mountain Infantry Brigade ====
Badge of the 27th Mountain Infantry Brigade

- 27^{e} Brigade d’Infanterie de Montagne (27^{e} BIM) – 27th Mountain Infantry Brigade, in Grenoble
  - 27^{e} Compagnie de Commandement et de Transmissions de Montagne (27^{e} CCTM) - 27th Mountain Command and Signals Company, in Varces
  - 4^{e} Régiment de Chasseurs (4^{e} RCh) - 4th Chasseurs Regiment (AMX-10 RC, ERC 90, VAB, VBL vehicles, being replaced by EBRC Jaguar vehicles), in Gap
  - 7^{e} Bataillon de Chasseurs Alpins (7^{e} BCA) - 7th Mountain Infantry Battalion (VAB, VHM vehicles), in Varces
  - 13^{e} Bataillon de Chasseurs Alpins (13^{e} BCA) - 13th Mountain Infantry Battalion (VBMR Griffon, VHM vehicles), in Barby
  - 27^{e} Bataillon de Chasseurs Alpins (27^{e} BCA) - 27th Mountain Infantry Battalion (VAB, VHM vehicles), in Cran-Gevrier
  - Bataillon de Réserve des Alpes - Reserve Battalion of the Alps, in Grenoble
  - 93^{e} Régiment d'Artillerie de Montagne (93^{e} RAM) - 93rd Mountain Artillery Regiment (CAESAR howitzers, RTF1 mortars, Mistral missiles), in Varces
  - 2^{e} Régiment Étranger de Génie (2^{e} REG) - 2nd Foreign Engineer Regiment, in Saint-Christol
  - 6^{e} Groupement d'Instruction de Montagne (6^{e} GIM) - 6th Mountain Instruction Group, in Gap
  - École militaire de haute montagne (EMHM) - High Mountain Military School, in Chamonix
    - Groupement d'Aguerrissement en Montagne (GAM) - Mountain Acclimatization Grouping, in Modane

==== Franco-German Brigade ====
Badge of the Franco-German Brigade

Only the French units of the Franco-German Brigade are listed below.

- Brigade Franco-Allemande (BFA) – Franco-German Brigade, in Müllheim (Germany)
  - 1^{er} Régiment d'Infanterie (1^{er} RI) - 1st Infantry Regiment (VBMR Griffon), in Sarrebourg (France)
  - 3^{e} Régiment de Hussards (3^{e} RH) - 3rd Hussar Regiment (AMX-10 RC, VAB, VBL vehicles, being replaced by EBRC Jaguar vehicles), in Metz (France)
  - Bataillon de Commandement et de Soutien (BCS) - Command and Support Battalion, in Müllheim (Germany)

=== 3rd Division ===
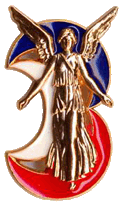
Badge of the 3rd Division

The 3rd Division carries the traditions of the 3rd Algerian Infantry Division.

- 3^{e} Division (3^{e} DIV) – 3rd Division, in Marseille
- Bataillon de Commandement et de Quartier Général (BCQG) - Command and Headquarters Battalion, in Marseille

==== 2nd Armored Brigade ====
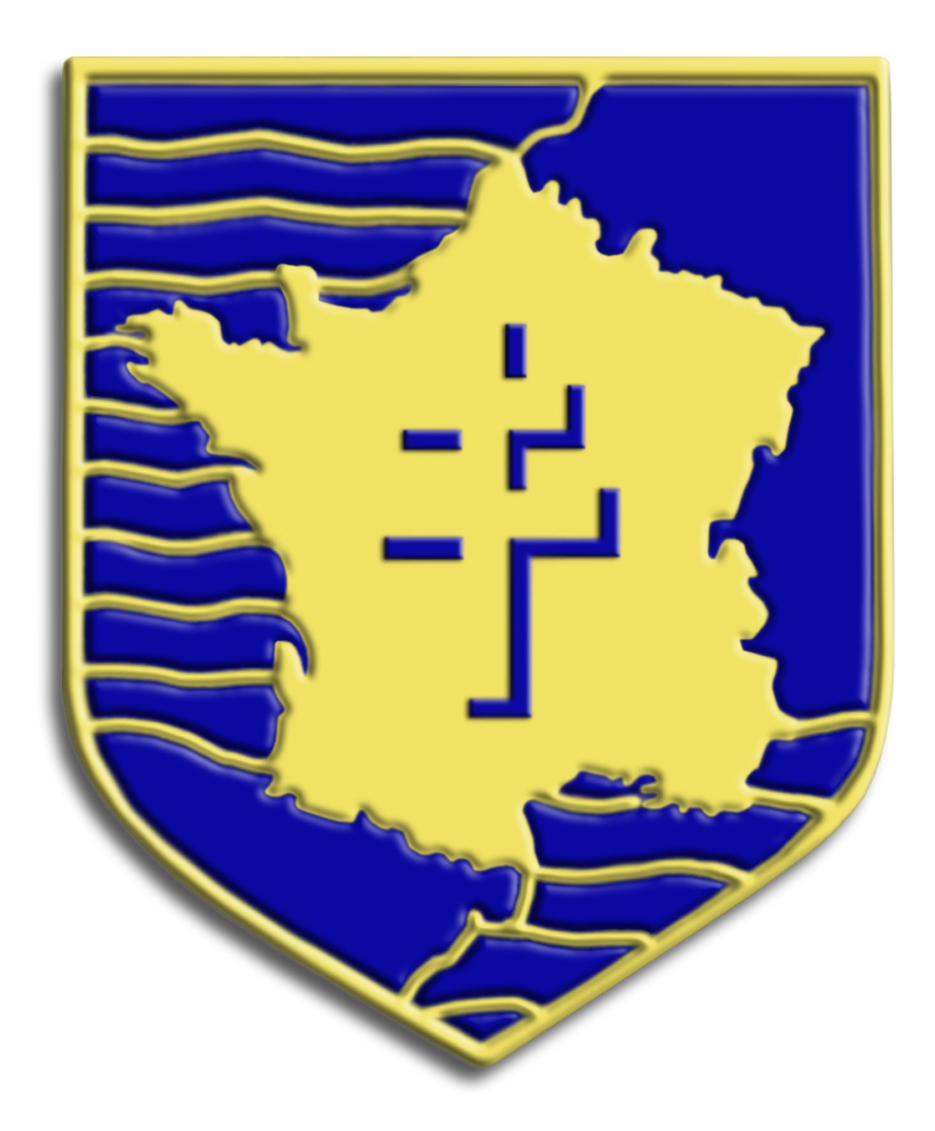
Badge of the 2nd Armored Brigade

- 2^{e} Brigade Blindée (2^{e} BB) – 2nd Armored Brigade, in Strasbourg
  - 2^{e} Compagnie de Commandement et de Transmissions Blindée (2^{e} CCTB) - 2nd Armored Command and Signals Company (VAB), in Illkirch-Graffenstaden
  - 12^{e} Régiment de Cuirassiers (12^{e} RC) - 12th Cuirassier Regiment (Leclerc MBTs, VBL vehicles), in Olivet
  - 501^{e} Régiment de Chars de Combat (501^{e} RCC) - 501st Tank Regiment (Leclerc MBTs, VAB, VBL vehicles), in Mourmelon-le-Grand
  - Régiment de Marche du Tchad (RMT) - "Ad hoc Regiment of Chad" (VBCI IFVs), in Meyenheim
  - 5^{e} Régiment de Cuirassiers (5^{e} RC) - 5th Cuirassier Regiment, in Abu Dhabi (United Arab Emirates)
  - 16^{e} Bataillon de Chasseurs à pied (16^{e} BCP) - 16th Chasseurs on Foot Battalion (VBCI IFVs), in Bitche
  - 92^{e} Régiment d'Infanterie (92^{e} RI) - 92nd Infantry Regiment (VBCI IFVs), in Clermont-Ferrand
  - 40^{e} Régiment d'Artillerie (40^{e} RA) - 40th Artillery Regiment (CAESAR howitzers, RTF1 mortars, Mistral missiles), in Suippes
  - 13^{e} Régiment du Génie (13^{e} RG) - 13th Engineer Regiment (VAB Génie), in Valdahon
  - 12^{e} Groupement d'Instruction (12^{e} GI) - 12th Instruction Group, in Bitche

==== 6th Light Armored Brigade ====
- 6^{e} Brigade Légère Blindée (6^{e} BLB) – 6th Light Armored Brigade, in Nîmes
  - 6^{e} Compagnie de Commandement et de Transmissions de Marine (6^{e} CCTMa) - 6th Marine Command and Signals Company (VAB), in Nîmes
  - 1^{er} Régiment de Spahis (1^{er} RS) – 1st Spahi Regiment (AMX-10 RC, VAB, VBL vehicles, being replaced by EBRC Jaguar vehicles), in Valence
  - 1^{er} Régiment Étranger de Cavalerie (1^{er} REC) - 1st Foreign Cavalry Regiment (EBRC Jaguar vehicles), in Marseille
  - 2^{e} Régiment Étranger d'Infanterie (2^{e} REI) - 2nd Foreign Infantry Regiment (VBCI IFVs), in Nîmes
  - 13^{e} Demi Brigade de Légion Etrangère (13^{e} DBLE) - 13th Demi-Brigade of the Foreign Legion (VBMR Griffon), in La Cavalerie
  - 21^{e} Régiment d'Infanterie de Marine (21^{e} RIMa) - 21st Marine Infantry Regiment (VBMR Griffon), in Fréjus
  - Bataillon de Marche - Marching Battalion (Reserve), in Nîmes
  - 3^{e} Régiment d'Artillerie de Marine (3^{e} RAMa) - 3rd Marine Artillery Regiment (CAESAR howitzers, RTF1 mortars, Mistral missiles), in Canjuers
  - 1^{er} Régiment Étranger de Génie (1^{er} REG) - 1st Foreign Engineer Regiment, in Laudun
  - 4^{e} Groupement d'Instruction des Troupes de Marine (4^{e} GITdM) - 4th Marine Instruction Group, in Fréjus

==== 11th Parachute Brigade ====
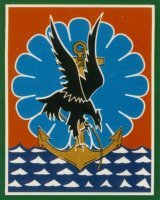
Badge of the 11th Parachute Brigade

- 11^{e} Brigade Parachutiste (11^{e} BP) – 11th Parachute Brigade, in Balma
  - 11^{e} Compagnie de Commandement et de Transmissions Parachutiste (11^{e} CCTP) - 11th Parachute Command and Signals Company, in Balma
  - 1^{er} Régiment de Hussards Parachutistes (1^{er} RHP) - 1st Parachute Hussar Regiment (AMX-10 RC, ERC 90, VAB, VBL vehicles, being replaced by EBRC Jaguar vehicles), in Tarbes
  - 1^{er} Régiment de Chasseurs Parachutistes (1^{er} RCP) - 1st Parachute Chasseur Regiment (VAB), in Pamiers
  - 2^{e} Régiment Étranger de Parachutistes (2^{e} REP) - 2nd Foreign Parachute Regiment (VAB), in Calvi
  - 3^{e} Régiment de Parachutistes d'Infanterie de Marine (3^{e} RPIMa) - 3rd Marine Infantry Parachute Regiment (VBMR-L Serval vehicles), in Carcassonne
  - 8^{e} Régiment de Parachutistes d'Infanterie de Marine (8^{e} RPIMa) - 8th Marine Infantry Parachute Regiment (VAB), in Castres
  - 35^{e} Régiment d'Artillerie Parachutiste (35^{e} RAP) - 35th Parachute Artillery Regiment (CAESAR howitzers, RTF1 mortars, Mistral missiles), in Tarbes
  - 17^{e} Régiment du Génie Parachutiste (17^{e} RGP) - 17th Parachute Engineer Regiment, in Montauban
  - 1^{er} Régiment du Train Parachutiste (1^{er} RTP) - 1st Parachute Supply Regiment, in Toulouse
  - École des Troupes Aéroportées (ETAP) - Airborne Troops School, in Pau
  - 11^{e} Régiment Parachutiste d'Instruction et d'Entraînement (11^{e} RPIE) - 11th Parachute Instruction and Training Regiment, in Caylus

=== Army Special Actions Command ===
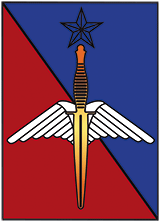
Badge of the COM FST.

The Army Special Actions Command recruits and trains the army's special forces units and is headquartered in Pau. Operationally the command falls under the Special Operations Command.

- Commandement des Actions Spéciales Terre (CAST) - Army Special Actions Command, in Pau
  - Compagnie de Commandement et de Transmissions des Forces Spéciales (CCTFS) - Special Forces Command and Signals Company, in Pau
  - 1^{er} Régiment de Parachutistes d'Infanterie de Marine (1^{er} RPIMa) - 1st Marine Infantry Paratroopers Regiment, in Bayonne
  - 4^{e} Régiment d'Hélicoptères des Forces Spéciales (4^{e} RHFS) - 4th Special Forces Helicopter Regiment, in Pau
  - 13^{e} Régiment de Dragons Parachutistes (13^{e} RDP) - 13th Paratrooper Dragoons Regiment, in Martignas-sur-Jalle
  - 712^{e} Compagnie de Transmissions (712^{e} CT) - Cyber Company, in Martignas-sur-Jalle
  - Académie des Forces Spéciales (Académie FS) - Special Forces Academy, in Pau
  - Centre Interarmées des Actions sur l’Environnement (CIAE) - Joint Environmental Action Center (PSYOPS), in Lyon

=== Intelligence and Deep Strike Command ===
- Commandement des actions dans la profondeur et du renseignement (CAPR) - Intelligence and Deep Strike Command, in Strasbourg
  - Centre du Renseignement Terre (CRT) - Army Intelligence Center, in Strasbourg
  - Bataillon de Renseignement de Réservistes Spécialistes (B2RS) - Specialist Reserve Intelligence Battalion in Strasbourg, Paris and Toulouse

==== 4th Air-Combat Brigade ====
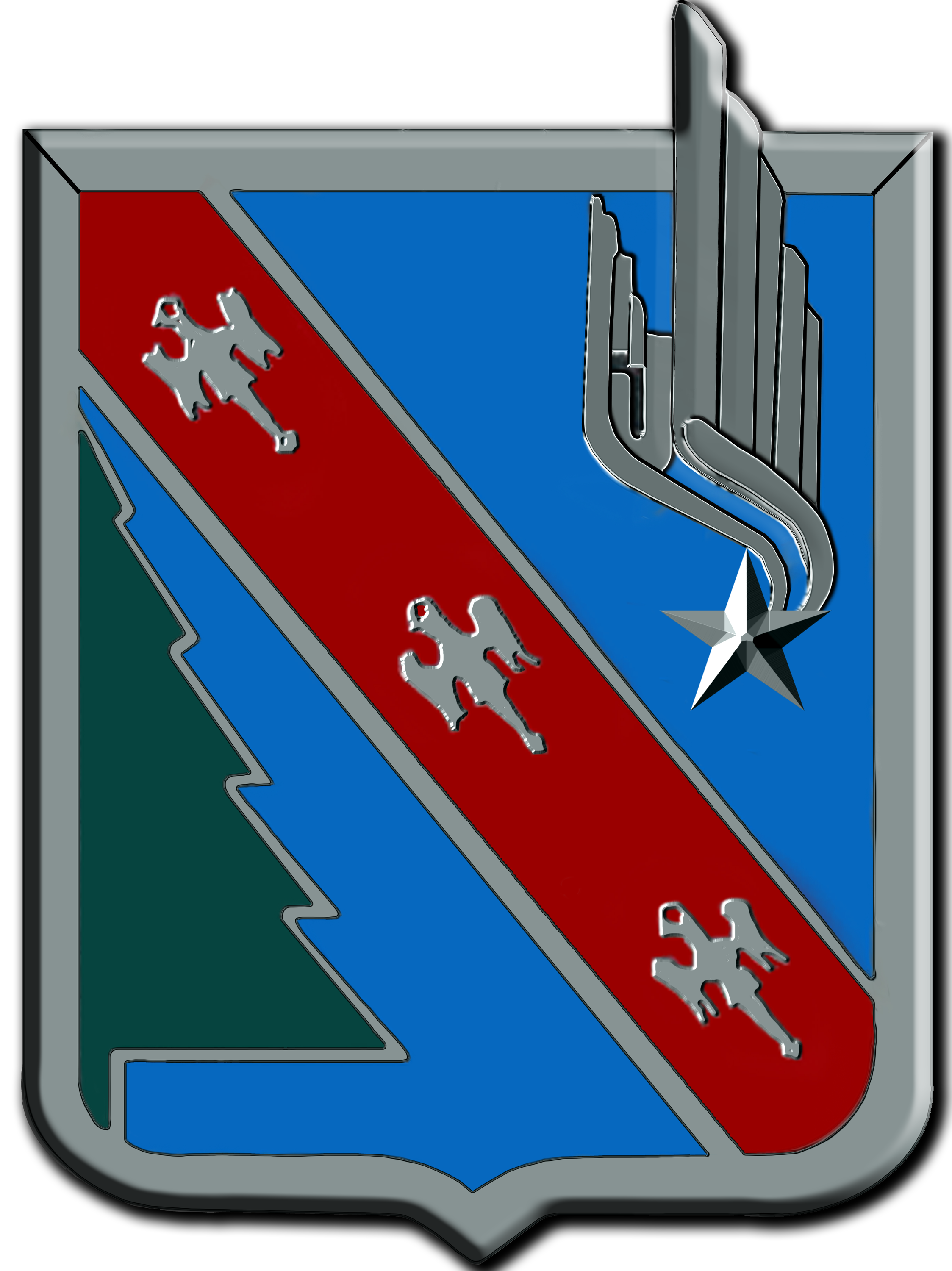
Badge of the 4^{e} BAC.

The 4th Air-Combat Brigade contains all the operational helicopter regiments of the army and is headquartered in Clermont-Ferrand.

- 4^{e} Brigade d'Aérocombat (4^{e} BAC) - 4th Air-Combat Brigade, in Clermont-Ferrand
  - 4^{e} Compagnie de Commandement de Transmissions et Soutien d'Aérocombat (4^{e} CCTSA) - 4th Air-Combat Command Signals and Support Company, in Clermont-Ferrand
  - 1^{er} Régiment d'Hélicoptères de Combat (1^{er} RHC) - 1st Combat Helicopter Regiment, in Phalsbourg
  - 3^{e} Régiment d'Hélicoptères de Combat (3^{e} RHC) - 3rd Combat Helicopter Regiment, in Étain
  - 5^{e} Régiment d'Hélicoptères de Combat (5^{e} RHC) - 5th Combat Helicopter Regiment, in Pau
  - 9^{e} Régiment de Soutien Aéromobile (9^{e} RSAM) - 9th Airmobile Support Regiment, in Montauban

==== 19th Artillery Brigade ====
- 19^{e} Brigade d'Artillerie - 19th Artillery Brigade, in Béligneux
  - 1^{er} Régiment d'Artillerie (1^{er} RA) - 1st Artillery Regiment (M270 MLRS), in Bourogne
  - 54^{e} Régiment d'Artillerie (54^{e} RA) - 54th Artillery Regiment (Mistral missiles), in Hyères
  - 61^{e} Régiment d'Artillerie (61^{e} RA) - 61st Artillery Regiment (Patroller Unmanned aerial vehicles), in Chaumont
  - École des Drones - Unmanned aerial vehicles School, in Chaumont

==== Intelligence and Cyber-Electronics Brigade ====
- Brigade de renseignement et cyber-électronique - Intelligence and Cyber-Electronics Brigade, in Strasbourg
  - 2^{e} Régiment de Hussards (2^{e} RH) - 2nd Hussar Regiment (VBL vehicles), in Haguenau
  - 44^{e} Régiment de Transmissions (44^{e} RT) - 44th Signal Regiment (Signals Intelligence), in Mutzig
  - 54^{e} Régiment de Transmissions (54^{e} RT) - 54th Signal Regiment (Electronic Warfare), in Haguenau
  - 785^{e} Compagnie de Guerre Électronique (785^{e} CGE) - 785th Electronic Warfare Company, in Saint-Jacques-de-la-Lande
  - 151^{e} Groupement d'Instruction (151^{e} GI) - 151st Instruction Group, in Verdun

=== Theater Support and Logistics Command ===
- Commandement de l'appui et de la logistique de théâtre (CALT) - Theater Support and Logistics Command, in Lille

==== Engineer Brigade ====
- Brigade du Génie (BGEN) - Engineer Brigade, in Angers
  - 2^{e} Régiment de Dragons (2^{e} RD) - 2nd Dragoon Regiment (CBRN-defense Regiment), in Fontevraud-l'Abbaye
  - 19^{e} Régiment du Génie (19^{e} RG) - 19th Engineer Regiment, in Besançon (one company in Mourmelon-le-Grand, one company in Canjuers)
  - 25^{e} Régiment du Génie de l'Air (25^{e} RGA) - 25th Air Engineer Regiment (supporting the French Air Force), in Istres, Mont-de-Marsan and Avord
  - 31^{e} Régiment du Génie (31^{e} RG) - 31st Engineer Regiment, in Castelsarrasin
  - 132^{e} Régiment d'Infanterie Cynotechnique (132^{e} RIC) - 132nd Military Working Dog Infantry Regiment, in Suippes
  - 28^{e} Régiment d'Artillerie Géographique (28^{e} RAG) - 28th Artillery Geographic Regiment, in Haguenau

==== Logistic Brigade ====
- Brigade Logistique - Logistic Brigade, in Montlhéry
  - 14^{e} Régiment d'Infanterie et de Logistique Parachutiste (14^{e} RILP) - 14th Infantry and Parachute Logistic Regiment, in Toulouse
  - 121^{e} Régiment du Train (121^{e} RT) - 121st Supply Regiment, in Montlhéry
  - 503^{e} Régiment du Train (503^{e} RT) - 503rd Supply Regiment, in Nîmes
  - 511^{e} Régiment du Train (511^{e} RT) - 511th Supply Regiment, in Auxonne
  - 515^{e} Régiment du Train (515^{e} RT) - 515th Supply Regiment, in Brie
  - 516^{e} Régiment du Train (516^{e} RT) - 516th Supply Regiment, in Toul
  - 519^{e} Régiment du Train (519^{e} RT) - 519th Supply Regiment, in Toulon
  - Régiment Médical (RMED) - Medical Regiment, in Valbonne
  - 15^{e} Groupement d'Instruction de la Logistique (15^{e} GIL) - 15th Logistic Instruction Group, in Montlhéry

==== Maintenance Brigade ====
- Brigade de Maintenance - Maintenance Brigade, in Versailles
  - 2^{e} Régiment du Matériel (2^{e} RMAT) - 2nd Materiel Regiment, in Bruz, Poitiers and Saint-Jacques-de-la-Lande
  - 3^{e} Régiment du Matériel (3^{e} RMAT) - 3rd Materiel Regiment (Parachute capable), in Muret, Montauban and Vayres
  - 4^{e} Régiment du Matériel (4^{e} RMAT) - 4th Materiel Regiment, in Nimes, Canjuers, Draguignan and Miramas
  - 6^{e} Régiment du Matériel (6^{e} RMAT) - 6th Materiel Regiment, in Besançon, Gresswiller and Woippy
  - 7^{e} Régiment du Matériel (7^{e} RMAT) - 7th Materiel Regiment, in Lyon and Varces
  - 8^{e} Régiment du Matériel (8^{e} RMAT) - 8th Materiel Regiment, in Mourmelon and Satory
  - 1^{er} Groupement d'Instruction de la Brigade de Maintenance (1^{er} GI BMAINT) - 1st Maintenance Brigade Instruction Group, in Garrigues

=== Digital and Cyber Land Support Command ===
- Commandement de l'Appui Terrestre Numérique et Cyber (CATNC) - Digital and Cyber Land Support Command, in Cesson-Sévigné
  - 121^{e} Compagnie de Transmissions (121^{e} CT) - 121st Signal Company (Headquarters Support Company), in Cesson-Sévigné

==== Digital and Cyber Support Brigade ====
- Brigade d'Appui Numérique et du Cyber (BANC) - Digital and Cyber Support Brigade, in Cesson-Sévigné
  - 28^{e} Régiment de Transmissions (28^{e} RT) - 28th Signal Regiment, in Issoire
  - 40^{e} Régiment de Transmissions (40^{e} RT) - 40th Signal Regiment, in Thionville and Hettange-Grande
  - 41^{e} Régiment de Transmissions (41^{e} RT) - 41st Signal Regiment, in Douai
  - 48^{e} Régiment de Transmissions (48^{e} RT) - 48th Signal Regiment, in Agen
  - 53^{e} Régiment de Transmissions (53^{e} RT) - 53rd Signal Regiment, in Lunéville and Chenevières
  - Régiment de Cyberdéfense (Cyber) - Cyber Defence Regiment, in Saint-Jacques-de-la-Lande
  - 18^{e} Régiment d'Instruction des Transmissions (18^{e} RIT) - 18th Signal Instruction Regiment, in Dieuze

=== Combined Arms Combat Training Command ===
- Commandement de l’Entraînement au Combat InterArmes (COMECIA) - Combined Arms Combat Training Command, in Mourmelon-le-Grand
  - 1^{er} Régiment de Chasseurs d'Afrique (1^{er} RCA) - Armored Training Regiment, in Canjuers
  - 17^{e} Régiment d'Artillerie (17^{e} RA) - Air-defense Training Regiment, in Biscarrosse
  - 1^{er} Régiment de Choc (1^{er} Choc) - Commando Training Regiment, in Mont-Louis
  - 1^{er} Bataillon de Chasseurs à pied (1^{er} BCP) - Combat Training Battalion, in Mailly-le-Camp
  - Centre d'Entraînement des Postes de Commandement (CEPC) - Command Posts Training Center, in Mailly-le-Camp
  - 51^{e} Régiment d'Infanterie (51^{e} RI) - Interarms and Logistic Support Training Regiment, in Mourmelon-le-Grand
  - 94^{e} Régiment d'Infanterie (94^{e} RI) - Urban Areas Training Regiment, in Sissonne

== DC SIMMT ==
- Direction Centrale de la Structure Intégrée du Maintien en condition opérationnelle des Matériels Terrestres (DC SIMMT) - Central Directorate of the Integrated Structure for the Maintenance of Terrestrial Materiel in Operational Condition, in Versailles

=== Industrial Maintenance Service ===
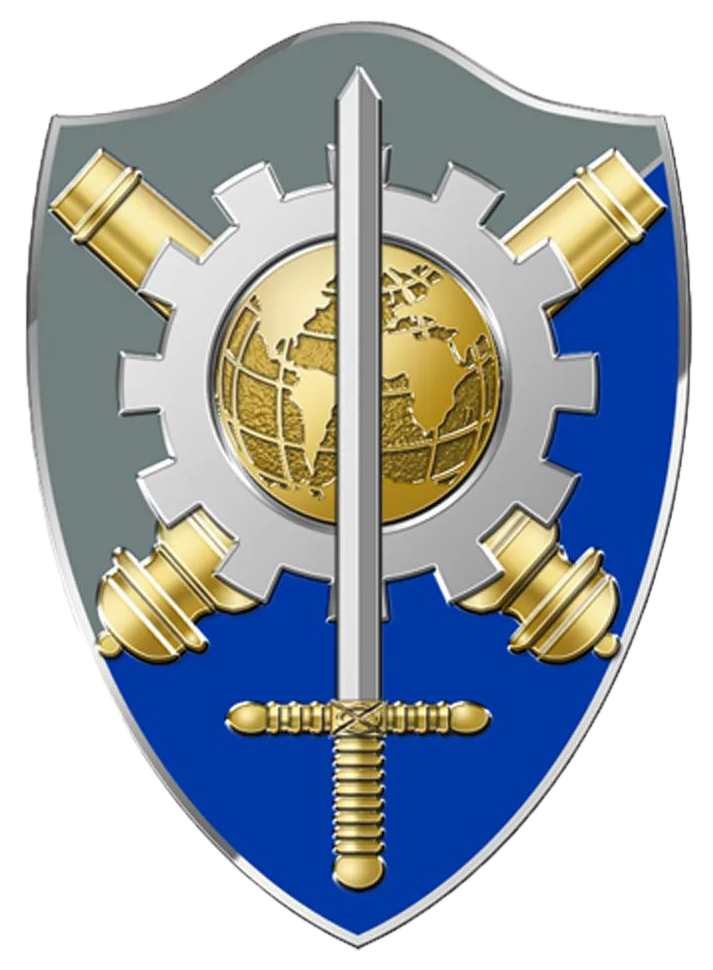
Badge of the Industrial Maintenance Service

- Service de la Maintenance Industrielle Terrestre (SMITer) - Industrial Maintenance Service, in Versailles
  - 12^{e} Base de Soutien du Matériel (12^{e} BSMAT) - 12th Materiel Support Base, in Neuvy-Pailloux, Douai and Gien
  - 13^{e} Base de Soutien du Matériel (13^{e} BSMAT) - 13th Materiel Support Base, in Clermont-Ferrand, Moulins, Saint-Astier and Tulle
  - 14^{e} Base de Soutien du Matériel (14^{e} BSMAT) - 14th Materiel Support Base, in Nouâtre, Bruz and Poitiers
  - Centre des Transports et Transits de Surface (CTTS) - Surface Transport and Transit Center, in Montlhéry

== Army Human Resources Directorate ==
- Direction des Ressources Humaines de l'Armée de terre (DRHAT) - Army Human Resources Directorate, in Tours
  - Délégation aux Réserves de l'Armée de Terre (DRAT) - Army Reserves Delegation, in Paris
  - Centre Expert Ressources Humaines et Solde - Human Resources and Salary Center, in Nancy

=== Recruitment Center - Youth ===
- Pôle Recrutement - Jeunesse
  - Groupement de Recrutement et de Sélection Île-de-France et outre-mer (GRS IDF OM) - Recruiting Group (Flag and traditions of the 8^{e} Bataillon de Chasseurs), in Paris
  - Groupement de Recrutement et de Sélection Nord-Est (GRS NE) - Recruiting Group (Flag and traditions of the 8^{e} Régiment d'Artillerie), in Vandœuvre-lès-Nancy
  - Groupement de Recrutement et de Sélection Nord-Ouest (GRS NO) - Recruiting Group (Flag and traditions of the 41^{e} Régiment d'Infanterie), in Saint-Jacques-de-la-Lande
  - Groupement de Recrutement et de Sélection Sud-Est (GRS SE) - Recruiting Group (Flag and traditions of the 99^{e} Régiment d'Infanterie), in Lyon
  - Groupement de Recrutement et de Sélection Sud-Ouest (GRS SO) - Recruiting Group (Flag and traditions of the 7^{e} Régiment d'Infanterie de Marine), in Bordeaux
  - Service Militaire Volontaire (SMV) - Voluntary Military Service, in Paris
    - 1^{er} Régiment du Service Militaire Volontaire (1^{er} RSMV) - 1st Voluntary Military Service Regiment (Flag and traditions of the 2^{e} Régiment du Génie), in Montigny-lès-Metz
    - 2^{e} Régiment du Service Militaire Volontaire (2^{e} RSMV) - 2nd Voluntary Military Service Regiment (Flag and traditions of the 10^{e} Régiment d'Artillerie de Marine), in Brétigny-sur-Orge
    - 3^{e} Régiment du Service Militaire Volontaire (3^{e} RSMV) - 3rd Voluntary Military Service Regiment (Flag and traditions of the 57^{e} Régiment d'Infanterie), in La Rochelle
    - Détachement du Service Militaire Volontaire (DSMV) - Voluntary Military Service Detachment, in Châlons-en-Champagne
  - Service Militaire Adapté (SMA) - Adapted Military Service, in Paris
    - Détachement du Service Militaire Adapté (DSMA) - Adapted Military Service Detachment, in Périgueux
    - Régiment du Service Militaire Adapté de la Martinique (RSMA-M) - Martinique Adapted Military Service Regiment, in Martinique
    - Régiment du Service Militaire Adapté de la Guadeloupe (RSMA-Ga) - Guadeloupe Adapted Military Service Regiment, in Guadeloupe
    - Régiment du Service Militaire Adapté de Guyane (RSMA-Gy) - Guiana Adapted Military Service Regiment, in French Guiana
    - Régiment du Service Militaire Adapté de La Réunion (RSMA-R) - Réunion Adapted Military Service Regiment, in Réunion
    - Régiment du Service Militaire Adapté de Nouvelle-Calédonie (RSMA-NC) - New Caledonia Adapted Military Service Regiment, in New Caledonia
    - Régiment du Service Militaire Adapté de Polynésie française (RSMA-PF) - French Polynesia Adapted Military Service Regiment, in French Polynesia
    - Bataillon du Service Militaire Adapté de Mayotte (BSMA-Mayotte) - Mayotte Adapted Military Service Battalion, in Mayotte

=== Formation Center ===
- Pôle Formation (PFORM) - Formation Center, in Tours
  - École Nationale des Sous-Officiers d'Active (ENSOA) - Non-commissioned Officiers School in Saint-Maixent-l'École
  - Académie militaire de Saint-Cyr Coëtquidan (AMSCC) in Coëtquidan
  - École Militaire Préparatoire Technique (EMPT) - Technical Preparatory Military School in Bourges
  - Centre National des Sports de la Défense (CNSD) - Defense Sports Center in Fontainebleau
  - École de Guerre - Terre (EDG-T) - Army War School in Paris
  - École d'État-Major (EEM) - Staff School in Saumur
  - Enseignement Militaire Supérieur Scientifique et Technique (EMSST) - Higher Military Scientific and Technical Education in Paris
  - École Supérieure des Officiers de Réserve Spécialistes d'État-Major (ESORSEM) - Higher School for Reserve Officers Staff Specialists in Paris
  - École du Renseignement de l'Armée de Terre (ERAT) - Army Intelligence School in Saumur
  - École de l'Infanterie (EI) - Infantry School in Draguignan
  - École du Génie (EG) - Engineering School in Angers
  - École de l'Artillerie (EA) - Artillery School in Draguignan
  - École de Cavalerie (EC) - Cavalery School in Saumur
  - École des Transmissions, du Numérique et du Cyber (ETNC) - Signal, Digital and Cyber School in Cesson-Sévigné
  - École du Train et de la Logistique Opérationnelle (ETLO) - Supply and Logistic School in Bourges
  - École du Matériel (ECOMAT) - Maintenance School in Bourges
  - École Militaire de Spécialisation de l’Outre-Mer et l’Étranger (EMSOME) - Military School of Overseas and Foreign Specialization in Tours

== Territorial Zones Command ==
France is divided into six Defense and Security zones, which provide territorial services to military and civil authorities in their area.

- Commandement Territorial de Niveau Zonal (COM ZT) - Territorial Zones Command, in Paris
  - Île-de-France Zone, in Saint-Germain-en-Laye
    - 24^{e} Régiment d'Infanterie (24^{e} RI) - 24th Infantry Regiment (Reserve unit), in Versailles
  - North-East Zone (covering Hauts-de-France, Grand Est), in Metz
  - North-West Zone (covering Pays de la Loire, Brittany, Normandy, Centre-Val de Loire), in Rennes
  - South-West Zone (covering Nouvelle-Aquitaine), in Bordeaux
  - South Zone (covering Occitanie, Provence-Alpes-Côte d'Azur, Corsica), in Marseille
  - South-East Zone (covering Auvergne-Rhône-Alpes, Bourgogne-Franche-Comté), in Lyon

== Geographic Distribution ==
French Army brigade units 2020:

== Footnotes ==
Notes

Citations
