= Signal Corps (French Army) =

Military communications arm of the French Army

Corps de Transmissions
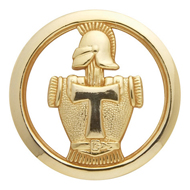
- Beret Cap badge
- Active: (Unofficially)1793 (Officially) 1942–present
- Country: France
- Branch: French Army
- Type: Military Administrative Corps
- Role: Providing means of communications and encryption
- Motto(s): "The Arm that unites the Forces" "L'Arme qui unit les armes"
- Anniversaries: Saint Gabriel, 29 September

The Signal Corps (Corps de Transmissions) of the French Army, is the military administrative corps which specialises in military communications and communications and information systems (CIS).

== History ==
After early developments 1793–1899, first specifically signals units were formed circa 1900 as part of the Engineers. The experience of the Battle of France showed that signals units being under the aegis of the Engineers did no longer allow for fully effective communications. As a result, on 1 June 1942, by Ministerial Decree no 3600/EMA/1 of 4 May 1942, Transmissions became a distinct arm, as part of the Armistice Army (of Vichy France).

== Current Formations and Units ==
- Information and Communication Systems Command (Commandement des Systèmes d’Information et de Communication), in Cesson-Sévigné
  - School of Signals (École de Transmissions), in Cesson-Sévigné
  - Centre of Initial Training for Non-Commissioned Members for CSIC Command (Centre de Formation Initiale des Militaires)/18éme Régiment de Transmissions, in Dieuze
    - Centre/Regimental Staff
    - Instruction Office
    - x2 Instruction Companies
    - Logistics Office
  - 28th Signal Regiment (28éme Régiment de Transmissions), in Issoire — Providing telecommunications and military information systems
    - Command and Logistics Company
    - x7 Communications Company
    - x1 Reserve Company
  - 40th Signal Regiment (40éme Régiment de Transmissions), in Thionville — Providing Information and Communication systems
    - Command and Logistics Company
    - x6 Communications Company
    - x1 Reserve Intervention Company
  - 41st Signal Regiment (41éme Régiment de Transmissions), in Douai — Providing support with divisional command posts
    - Command and Logistics Company
    - x6 Communications Company
    - x1 Reserve Intervention Company
  - 48th Signal Regiment (48éme Régiment de Transmissions), in Agen — Providing training and operations support command, command posts
    - Command and Logistics Company
    - x6 Communications Company
    - x1 Reserve Intervention Company
  - 53rd Signal Regiment (53éme Régiment de Transmissions), in Lunéville — Providing SIC and HQ main command posts
    - Command and Logistics company
    - 2nd–6th Companies, one for long distance communications, one for command and support to the divisions, and one ready for air-mobile deployments (4th)
    - 7th Company supporting equipment and supply deployed units
    - 8th Reserve Security and Defence Company
- Intelligence Command (Commandement du Renseignement) — Command isn't a transmissions affiliated command
  - 785th Electronic Warfare Company (785éme Compagnie de Guerre Electronique), in Saint-Jacques-de-la-Lande
  - 44th Signal Regiment (44éme Régiment de Transmissions), in Mutzig — Electromagnetic and Acquisition Intelligence
    - Command and Logistics Company
    - x6 Electronic Warfare Companies
  - 54th Signal Regiment (54éme Régiment de Transmissions), in Haguenau — Tactical electronic warfare regiment
    - Command and Logistics Company
    - Administration and Support Company
    - Operational Centre for Electronic Warfare Preparation
    - x4 Electronic Warfare Companies
    - x1 Reserve Intervention Company
- Regiments not under a specific command
  - Aeuronautical Information and Communication Systems Tactical Group (Groupe Tactique des Systemes d'Information et de Communications Aéronautiques), in Évreux — Air Force communications unit
  - Joint Directorate of Infrastructure Networks and Information Systems (Direction Interarmées des Résaux d'Infrastructure et des Systémes d'Information), at Fort de Bicêtre — Provides Joint communications for troops in the country and on deployments, along with secure government communications
    - Joint Directorate of Infrastructure Networks of Information Systems of the Île-de-France/8th Signal Regiment (Direction Interarmées des Réseaux d'Infrastructures des Systèmes d'Information d'Île de France / 8éme Régiment de Transmissions), at Fort Mont-Valérien, Suresnes — Joint regiment providing telecommunications and information systems for the Ministry of Defence
      - National Operational Support Centre/43rd Signal Battalion (Centre National de Soutien Opérational/43éme Bataillon de Transmissions), in Orléans — Logistical support body for the DIRISI

== See also ==
- Military history of France during World War II#French State Army (1940–44)
- History of the French Army
