= Intelligence Command (France) =

Two-star military intelligence command of the French Army

Intelligence and Electronic Warfare Brigade Intelligence Brigade Intelligence Command
- Brigade de Renseignement et de Guerre Électronique; Brigade de Renseignement; Commandement du Renseignement
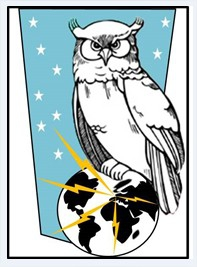
- Command badge
- Active: 1 September 1993–1 July 2016 (as brigade); 1 July 2016–Present (as command)
- Country: France
- Branch: French Army
- Type: Military Intelligence formation
- Size: Two-star command
- Part of: Land Forces Command
- Headquarters: Strasbourg

The Intelligence Command (French: Commandement du Renseignement) is a two-star command and military intelligence formation of the French Army formed following the end of the Cold War and expanded after the 2016 reorganisations.

== History ==
=== Brigade ===
In 1993, following the Dissolution of the Soviet Union and subsequent end of the Cold War, the French Army was completely reorganised. In 1993, the new structure began to take shape with the new Intelligence and Electronic Warfare Brigade (French: Brigade de Renseignement et de Guerre Électronique) (BRGE) stood up in Haguenau in Alsace. The brigade oversaw all military intelligence and specialist intelligence units assigned to the Rapid Action Force.

In 1998, following the end to conscription, the army was again reorganised, and the brigade reduced in size and redesignated simply as the Intelligence Brigade (French: Brigade de Renseignement).

In 2010, the brigade headquarters were shifted to Metz, however shortly afterwards the headquarters moved back to Haguenau. By 2016 the brigade comprised around 3,600 soldiers and civilians.

As part of the 2016 reorganisation of the French Army, the brigade was placed under the new Land Forces Command (French: Commandement des Forces Terrestres) and expanded to a two-star (division)-sized command.

During its tenure as a brigade-sized formation, the organisation was as follows:

- Headquarters, Intelligence Brigade, in Haguenau
  - 44th Signals Regiment (44éme Régiment de Transmissions), in Mutzig – Signals intelligence
  - 54th Signals Regiment (54éme Régiment de Transmissions), in Haguenau – Electronic warfare
  - 2nd Regiment of Hussars (2éme Régiment de Hussars), in Haguenau – Human Intelligence
  - 13th Parachute Dragoon Regiment (13ème Régiment de Dragons Parachutistes), in Martignas-sur-Jalle – attached till 2002 and moved to the French Army Special Forces Command
  - 61st Regiment of Artillery (61éme Régiment d'Artillerie), in Chaumont – UAV and Photo reconnaissance
  - 28th Geographic Group (28éme Groupe Géographique), in Haguenau
  - Intelligence Troops Initial Formation Centre (Centre de Formation Initiale des Militaires du rang du Renseignement), in Bitche

In the French Army, a unit designated as 'group' is a battalion equivalent unit in the combat support formations.

=== Command ===
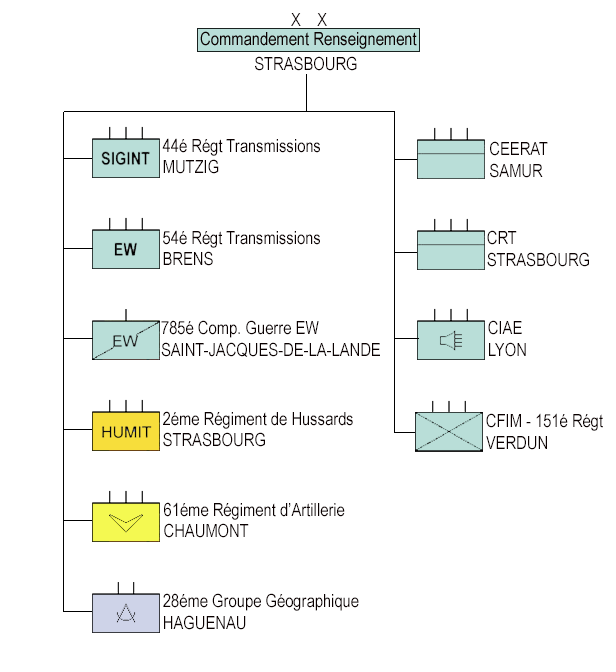
Structure of the command, as of July 2020.

Following the 2016 reforms, the Intelligence Command was formed on 1 July to oversee the intelligence and reconnaissance troops assigned to Land Forces Command. The command today controls; Multi-sensor intelligence, human intelligence, electromagnetic imagery, and geographic troops.

Today the command overseas around 4,300 civilians and soldiers including 430 deployed in Opérations Extérieures (overseas deployments), in self-relief and 200 contributing to the permanent strategic watch from the garrison.

== Mission ==
The command's mission is "the organic authority of the units of research, exploitation and military influence of the land forces. As such he [the brigade] is responsible for the training and operational preparation.".

== Organisation ==
The current organisation of the command is:

- Headquarters, Intelligence Command (Commandement du Rensuignement), in Strasbourg
  - 44th Signals Regiment (44éme Régiment de Transmissions), in Mutzig – Signals intelligence
  - 54th Signals Regiment (54éme Régiment de Transmissions), in Haguenau – Electronic warfare
  - 785th Electronic Warfare Company (785éme Compagnie Guerre Electronique), in Saint-Jacques-de-la-Lande
  - 2nd Regiment of Hussars (2éme Régiment de Hussars), in Haguenau – Human Intelligence
  - 61st Regiment of Artillery (61éme Régiment d'Artillerie), in Chaumont – UAV and Photo reconnaissance
  - 28th Geographic Group (28éme Groupe Géographique), in Haguenau
  - Joint Centre of Environmental Actions, in Lyon – Psychological intelligence
  - Joint Intelligence Training Centre (Centre de Formation Interarmées au Renseignement), in Strasbourg
  - Centre of Intelligence Assignment and Training (Centre d'Enseignement et d'Entraînement du renseignement de l'Armée de Terre), in Saumur
  - Intelligence Troops Initial Formation Centre/151st Infantry Regiment (Centre de Formation Initiale des Militaires du rang du Renseignement / 151éme Régiment d'Infanterie), in Verdun – since 2019, previously in Bitche

== See also ==
- Structure of the French Army
