= Cyber Defence Regiment (France) =

- Régiment de cyberdéfense
- Active: 27 February 2025 - present
- Country: France
- Branch: French Army
- Role: Cyberwarfare
- Size: 400 troops ca. (Full Operational Capability)
- Part of: Digital and Cyber Support Brigade
- Garrison/HQ: Saint-Jacques-de-la-Lande

Commanders
- Current commander: Lieutenant colonel Jean-François Caverne

The Cyber Defence Regiment (French: Régiment de cyberdéfense) is a cyberwarfare Regiment of the French Army. Headquartered in Saint-Jacques-de-la-Lande, it was created on 1 January 2025.

== History ==
The Cyber Defence Regiment was established on 1 January 2025. The Regiment derives from the merger of 807th Signals Company and of the Cyber Office of the Digital and Cyber Support Brigade (BANC). Its first commanding officer was Lieutenant Colonel Jean-François Caverne.

The regiment's creation ceremony took place on 27 February 2025. The Cyber Defence Regiment is scheduled to reach full operating capability by 2030. By the end of its ramp-up in 2030, the Cyber Defence Regiment will consist of 400 personnel from the three armed forces.

== Mission ==
The rationale behind the establishment of the Cyber Defence Regiment is to equip the French Armed Forces with a digital armed wing, in a rapidly changing military landscape, marked by an intensification of cyberwarfare.

The establishment of the Cyber Defence Regiment also concurs to improve the digital defence and security capabilities related to ground warfare. The Cyber Defence Regiment also contributes to the strategic autonomy of France.

== Organisation ==
The Cyber Defence Regiment is part of the Digital and Cyber Support Brigade (BANC) within the Digital and Cyber Land Support Command (CATNC).

The Regiment consists of a regimental command, an operations centre, and four basic units coordinated by the operations centre:

- 1st Company;
- 2nd Company;
- Reserve Company;
- Cyber Technical Centre.

Lieutenant colonel Jean-François is the first commander of the Cyber Defence Regiment.

=== 1st Company ===
The 1st Company is responsible for defensive cyber warfare of conventional digital systems. It deploys tactical SOCs as well as preventive or reactive cyber intervention groups and digital combat groups.
The 1st Company is heir to the missions and traditions of the 807th Signal Company.

=== 2nd Company ===
The 2nd company specialises in surveillance of friendly digital space (audit, intrusion test, etc.) and enemy (exploitation of intelligence of cyber interest, spectrum control) as well as in computer warfare adapted to weapon systems (LID SCORPION). It arms GCN and ensures the audit function of the Army.
The 2nd company is heir to the missions and traditions of the 808th signals company.

=== Reserve Company ===
The Reserve Company is responsible for supporting the regiment's entities and arming its operational units.

=== Cyber Technical Centre ===
The Cyber Technical Centre includes the Army's cybersecurity operations centre, an engineering cell, a cyber protection section, and an information and communications systems support group.

== See also ==
- Structure of the French Army
- List of cyber warfare forces
