= Saint-Jean-d'Illac =

- Commune
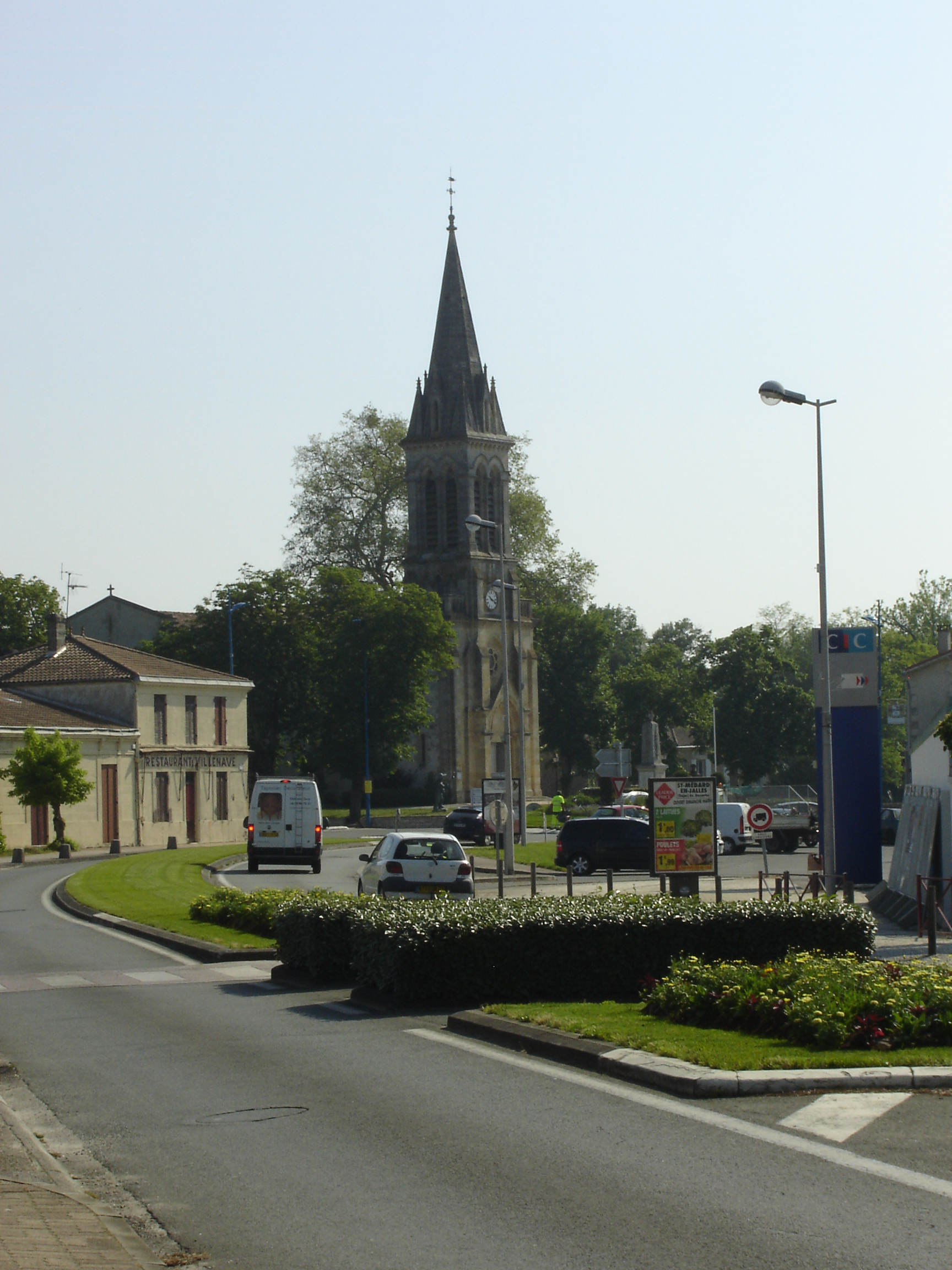
- The church in Saint-Jean-d'Illac

- Coat of arms
- Location of Saint-Jean-d'Illac
- Location within France Location within Nouvelle-Aquitaine
- Coordinates: 44°48′38″N 0°46′57″W
- Country: France
- Region: Nouvelle-Aquitaine
- Department: Gironde
- Arrondissement: Bordeaux
- Canton: Mérignac-2

Government
  - Mayor (2020–2026): Edouard Quintano
- Area^{1}: 120.57 km^{2} (46.55 sq mi)
- Elevation: 46 m (151 ft)
- Highest elevation: 61 m (200 ft)
- Lowest elevation: 34 m (112 ft)
- Population (2023): 9,616
  - Density: 79.75/km^{2} (206.6/sq mi)
- Time zone: UTC+01:00 (CET)
  - Summer (DST): UTC+02:00 (CEST)
- INSEE/Postal code: 33422 /33127
- ^{1} French Land Register data, which excludes lakes, ponds, glaciers > 1 km^{2} (0.386 sq mi or 247 acres) and river estuaries.

Saint-Jean-d'Illac (French pronunciation: [sɛ̃ ʒɑ̃ dijak]; Gascon: Sent Joan d'Ilhac) is a commune in the Gironde department in Nouvelle-Aquitaine in southwestern France.

== Population ==
Historical population
Year	Pop.	±% p.a.
1968	1,016	—
1975	1,498	+5.70%
1982	2,538	+7.82%
1990	3,879	+5.45%
1999	5,213	+3.34%
2007	6,541	+2.88%
2012	7,159	+1.82%
2017	8,377	+3.19%
2023	9,616	+2.33%
Source: INSEE

== See also ==
- Communes of the Gironde department
