= Engineering Arm =

Military engineering arm of the French Army

The Engineering Arm, or l'arme du génie, is the Military engineering arm of the French Army.

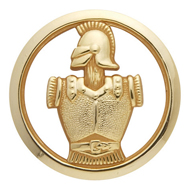
The beret badge of the French Engineering Arm

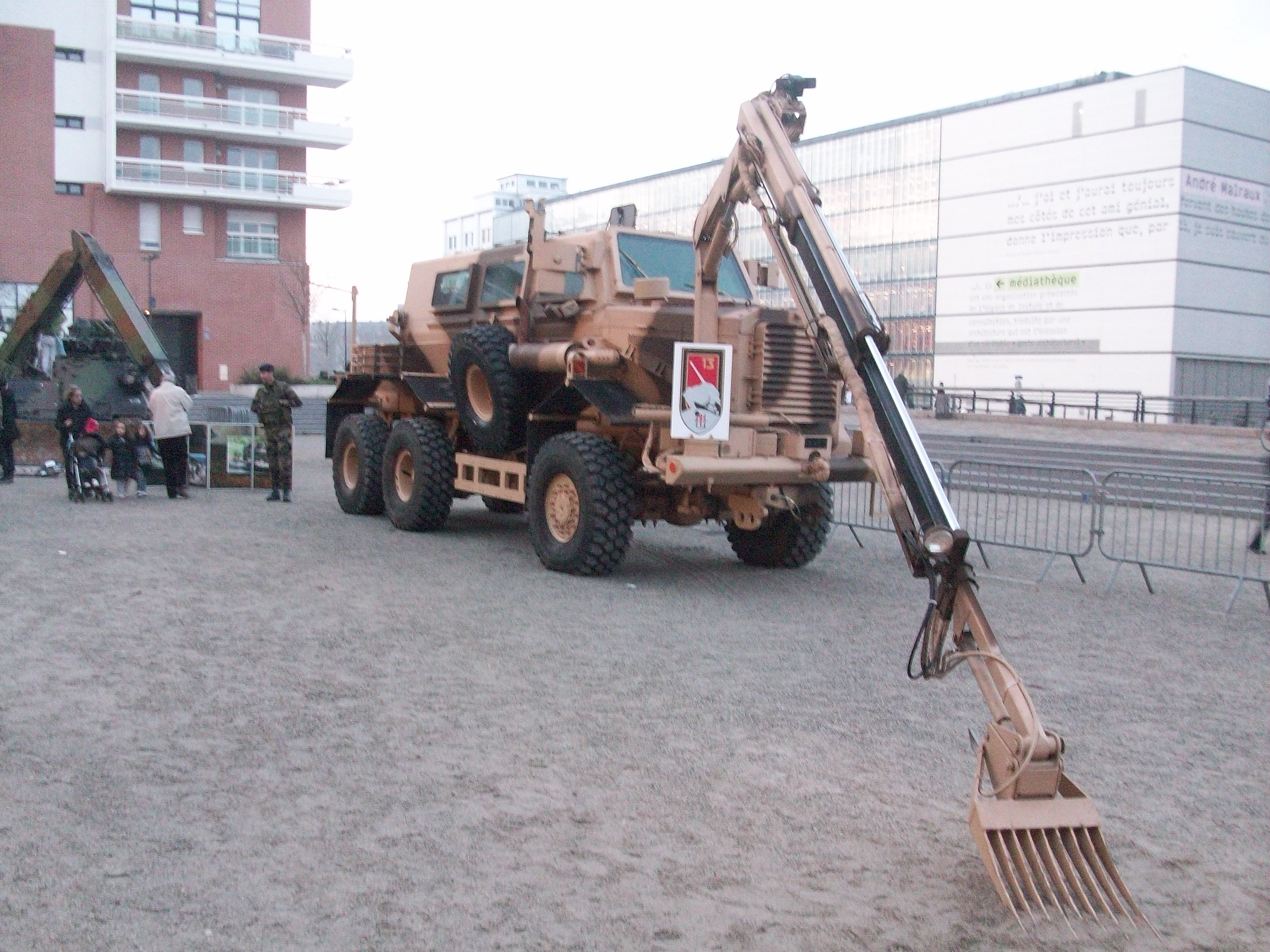
A Buffalo, a vehicle designed to deal with IEDs

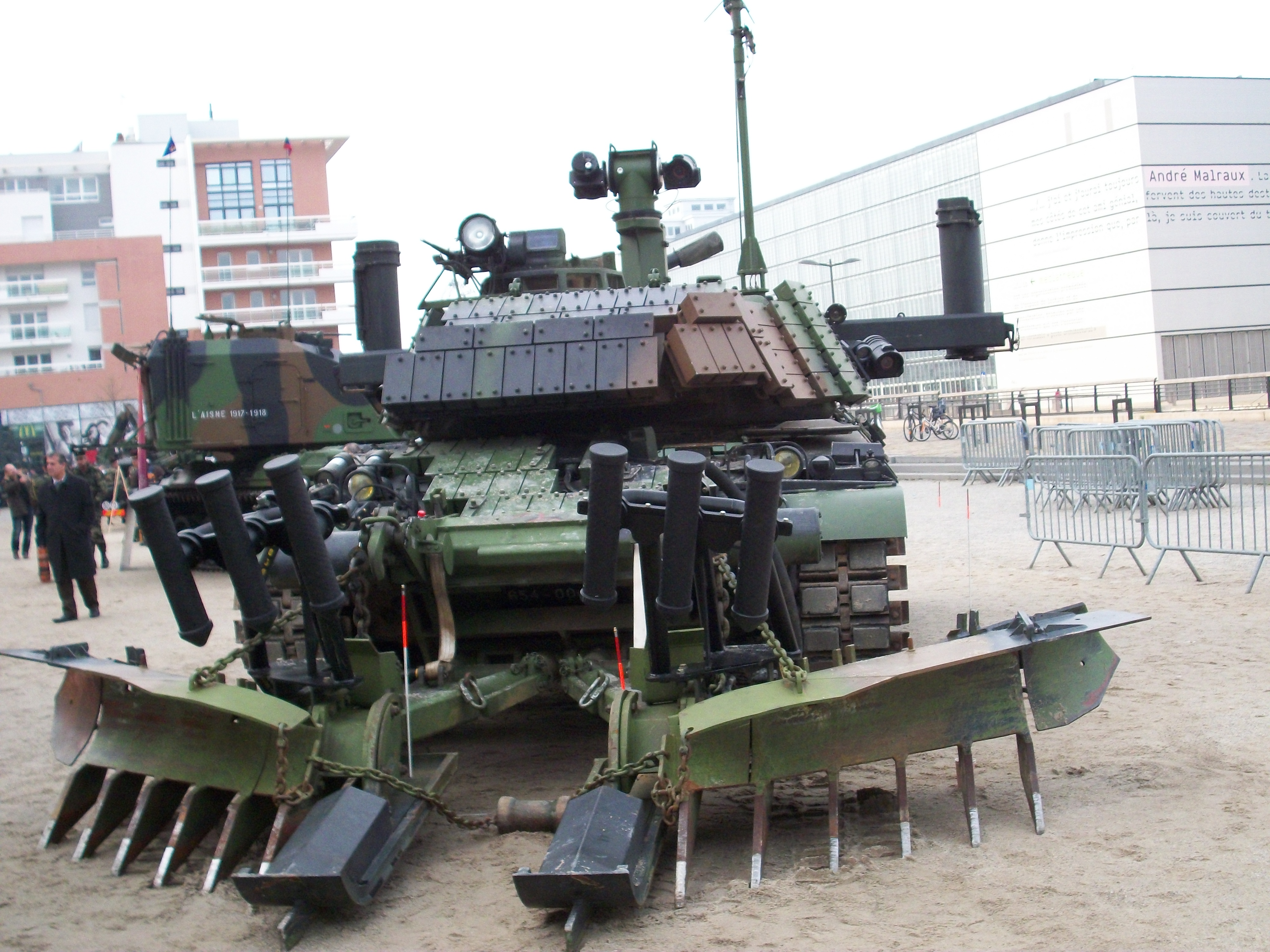
A French armoured engineering vehicle

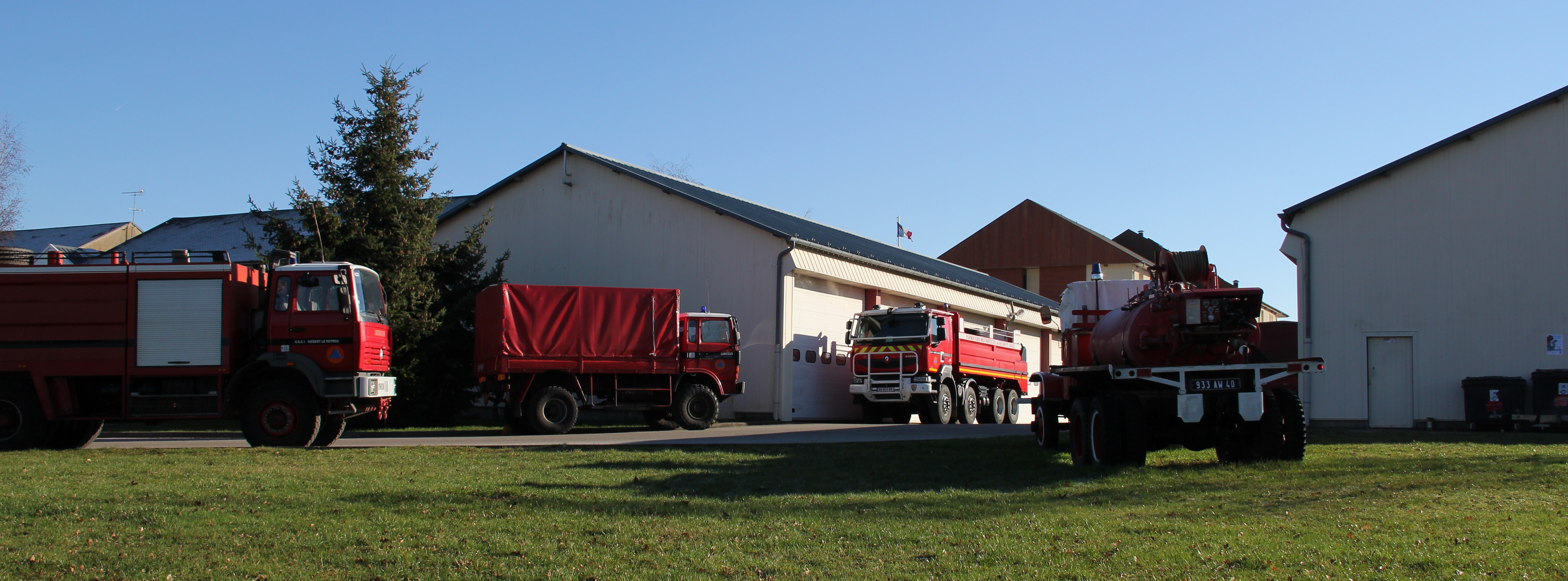
Fire-fighting vehicles of UIISC 1

The Engineering Arm's soldiers are known as sappers (sapeurs). Its soldiers in the Paris Fire Brigade are more specifically sapeurs-pompiers, and those of the Civil Security Instruction and Intervention Units are more specifically sapeurs-sauveteurs. The Arm's colours are red and black, and its patron saint is Saint Barbara. The Arm's motto is "Parfois détruire, souvent construire, toujours servir!", meaning "Sometimes to destroy, often to build, always to serve!"

The Engineering Arm is divided into three main services:

- The Land Component of the Defence Infrastructure Service, Composante Terre du Service d'infrastructure de la Défense (also known by its former title of the Engineering Service, le Service du Génie) fulfils conventional engineering roles for the French military and ministry of Defence. This includes the Technical Service for Buildings, Fortifications and Works, Service technique des bâtiments, fortifications et travaux
- Combat Engineering Regiments maintained throughout the French Army, namely
  - The 1st Foreign Engineer Regiment, 1er régiment étranger de génie, based in Laudun-l'Ardoise .
  - The 2nd Foreign Engineer Regiment, 2e régiment étranger de génie, based in Saint-Christol
  - The 3rd Engineer Regiment, 3e régiment du génie, based in Charleville-Mézières, founded in 1814.
  - The 6th Engineer Regiment, 6e régiment du génie, based in Angers
  - The 13th Engineer Regiment, 13e régiment du génie, based in Valdahon
  - The 17th Parachute Engineer Regiment, 17e régiment du génie parachutiste, an elite unit based in Montauban
  - The 19th Engineer Regiment, 19e régiment du génie, based in Besançon, which is descended from the Engineering Arm's units in French Algeria and is currently responsible for railway-related combat engineering.
  - The 31st Engineer Regiment, 31e régiment du génie, based in Castelsarrasin, which is descended from the Engineering Arm's units in the French protectorate in Morocco
- Fire and rescue services, provided by the “engineering security”, which comprises :
  - the Paris Fire Brigade (BSPP), comprising 8,600 military personnel
  - the Brigade Militaire de la Sécurité Civile (BMSC), with three regiments and a Unité d'Instruction et d'Intervention de la Sécurité Civile (RIISC/UIISC). These units have no territorial responsibilities, and can be deployed on rescue missions in France or abroad at very short notice. The 1st, 4th and 7th RIISC are battalion-level rapid reaction regiments, while UIISC 5 is a company-level training unit.

In addition, the 25th Air Engineer Regiment (25e régiment du génie de l'air) is shared between the army and air force. The regiment is specialised in building and maintaining air bases. The regiment is formally a part of the Engineering Arm, although it is operationally commanded by the air force.
