= Canton of Mérignac-2 =

Coordinates: 44.83°N 0.62°W

The canton of Mérignac-2 is an administrative division of the Gironde department, southwestern France. It was created in 1982. Its borders were not modified at the French canton reorganisation which came into effect in March 2015. Its seat is in Mérignac.

It consists of the following communes:

1. Martignas-sur-Jalle
2. Mérignac (partly)
3. Saint-Jean-d'Illac
