= La Valette =

- Commune
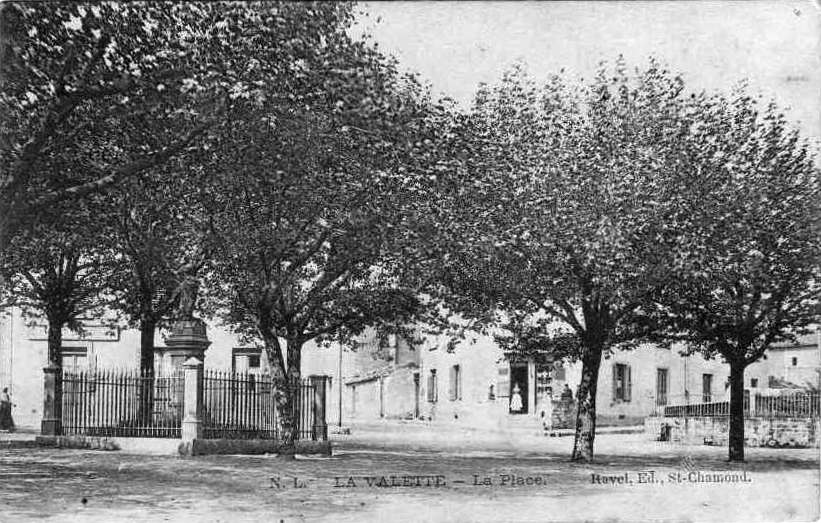
- La Valette at the start of the 20th century
- Location of La Valette
- Location within France Location within Auvergne-Rhône-Alpes
- Coordinates: 44°56′27″N 5°51′11″E
- Country: France
- Region: Auvergne-Rhône-Alpes
- Department: Isère
- Arrondissement: Grenoble
- Canton: Matheysine-Trièves

Government
  - Mayor (2020–2026): Maryse Barthélemi
- Area^{1}: 7.87 km^{2} (3.04 sq mi)
- Elevation: 850 m (2,790 ft)
- Highest elevation: 2,203 m (7,228 ft)
- Lowest elevation: 710 m (2,330 ft)
- Population (2023): 66
  - Density: 8.4/km^{2} (22/sq mi)
- Time zone: UTC+01:00 (CET)
  - Summer (DST): UTC+02:00 (CEST)
- INSEE/Postal code: 38521 /38350
- ^{1} French Land Register data, which excludes lakes, ponds, glaciers > 1 km^{2} (0.386 sq mi or 247 acres) and river estuaries.

La Valette (French pronunciation: [la valɛt]) is a commune in the Isère department in southeastern France.

== Population ==
Historical population
Year	Pop.	±% p.a.
1968	44	—
1975	38	−2.07%
1982	40	+0.74%
1990	32	−2.75%
1999	58	+6.83%
2007	72	+2.74%
2012	72	+0.00%
2017	71	−0.28%
2023	66	−1.21%
Source: INSEE

== See also ==
- Communes of the Isère department
