= Commandement des Forces Terrestres =

Commandement de la Force et des Opérations Terrestres
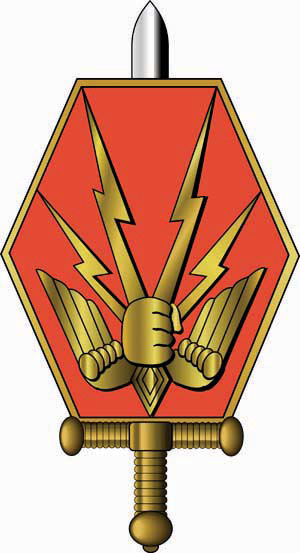
- Insignia of CFT
- Active: 30 June 1998 - present
- Country: France
- Branch: French Army
- Size: 467 men
- Part of: EMAT
- Garrison/HQ: Lille

The Commandement de la Force et des Opérations Terrestres (CFOT) is the new appellation (since January 2024) of the Commandement des Forces Terrestres, previously Commandement de la Force d'action Terrestre (“Command of the land combat forces”, French acronym CFAT). It is the supervising command for the land forces of the French Army.

The CFOT is under the orders of French Army headquarters (the État-major de l'armée de terre (EMAT)). In 2016, it controlled the 1st and 3rd "interarmes" (combined-arms) divisions and 7 brigades. It has also direct control over a Corps-size HQ, the 1st Army Corps (France).

The CFOT (then CFAT) was founded on the 30 June 1998 from the disbanding III Corps and is garrisoned in Lille, at Kleber barracks. It employs around 467 people, including generals, officers, non-commissioned officers, soldiers, civilians, and reserve personnel.

== See also ==
- Structure of the French Army
