= 31st Engineer Regiment (France) =

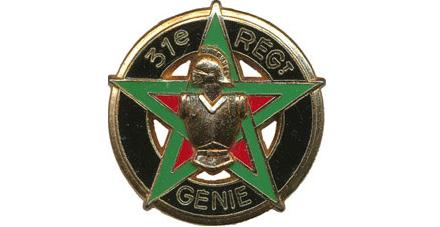
31st Engineer Regiment badge

The 31st Engineer Regiment (French: 31^{e} Régiment du Génie, (31^{e} RG)) is a regiment of the Engineering Arm (Génie militaire) of the French Army. It is part of the 3rd Division, Scorpion Force, and based at Castelsarrasin.

From 1920 to 1938 the 31st Engineering Battalion participated in all operations in Morocco. The battalion built a huge road and railway infrastructure, as well as all related works.
