= National Territory Land Command (France) =

- Commandement Terre pour le territoire national
- Active: 2016-present
- Country: France
- Part of: French Army
- Garrison/HQ: Paris
- Nickname: COM TN

Commanders
- Current commander: Général de Division Gaëtan Poncelin de Raucourt

The National Territory Land Command (French: Commandement Terre pour le territoire national) (COM TN) is a military command of the French Army.

The National Territory Land Command, of Divisional level, was established on 1 June 2016 as part of the Army Reorganization Plan named "Au Contact". It is under the authority of the Army Major-General. Its mission is to prepare the operational commitment of the forces of the Army throughout the French national territory.

The National Territory Land Command is installed at the Ecole Militaire de Paris, and it is the functional authority for 10,000 personnel of the French Army. Its first and current commander is Major General Gaëtan Poncelin de Raucourt.

== Mission ==
According to the official page, the Command is intended to become a "pole of excellence" and a support force dedicated to anticipation, preparation and operational engagement on the national territory. Its designed missions and tasks are:

- To anticipate and prepare the army to deal collectively with a crisis or a systemic threat on the national territory (e.g. major terrorist attack, centennial flood, pandemic, technological accident, etc.);
- To help prepare the French military and Nation for this challenge;
- To enhance and animate the network of Land units outside the Land operational budget program (BOP);
- To act as Delegate to the Army Reserves.

The command, with an operational component, will also have to be able, as necessary, to urgently reinforce the Joint Chiefs of Staff responsible for the conduct of operations on the national territory.

== Organization ==
The Command constitutes a headquarters organized in two divisions:

- Operational support to command;
- Study - preparation for commitment.

In addition, during the EURO 2016, the Command experimented a geographic information system (GIS) prototype that aims to promote the interoperability of armies with the security forces of the Ministry of the Interior via data sharing.

=== Subordinate units ===
Directly reporting units of the NTLC include the following Army units:

- Paris Fire Brigade;
- Unité d'instruction et d'intervention de la sécurité civile n°1;
- Unité d'instruction et d'intervention de la sécurité civile n°5;
- Unité d'instruction et d'intervention de la sécurité civile n°7;
- 25e régiment du génie de l'air;
- Service militaire adapté;
- Service militaire volontaire;
- Délégation aux réserves de l'Armée de terre
