= Martignas-sur-Jalle =

- Commune
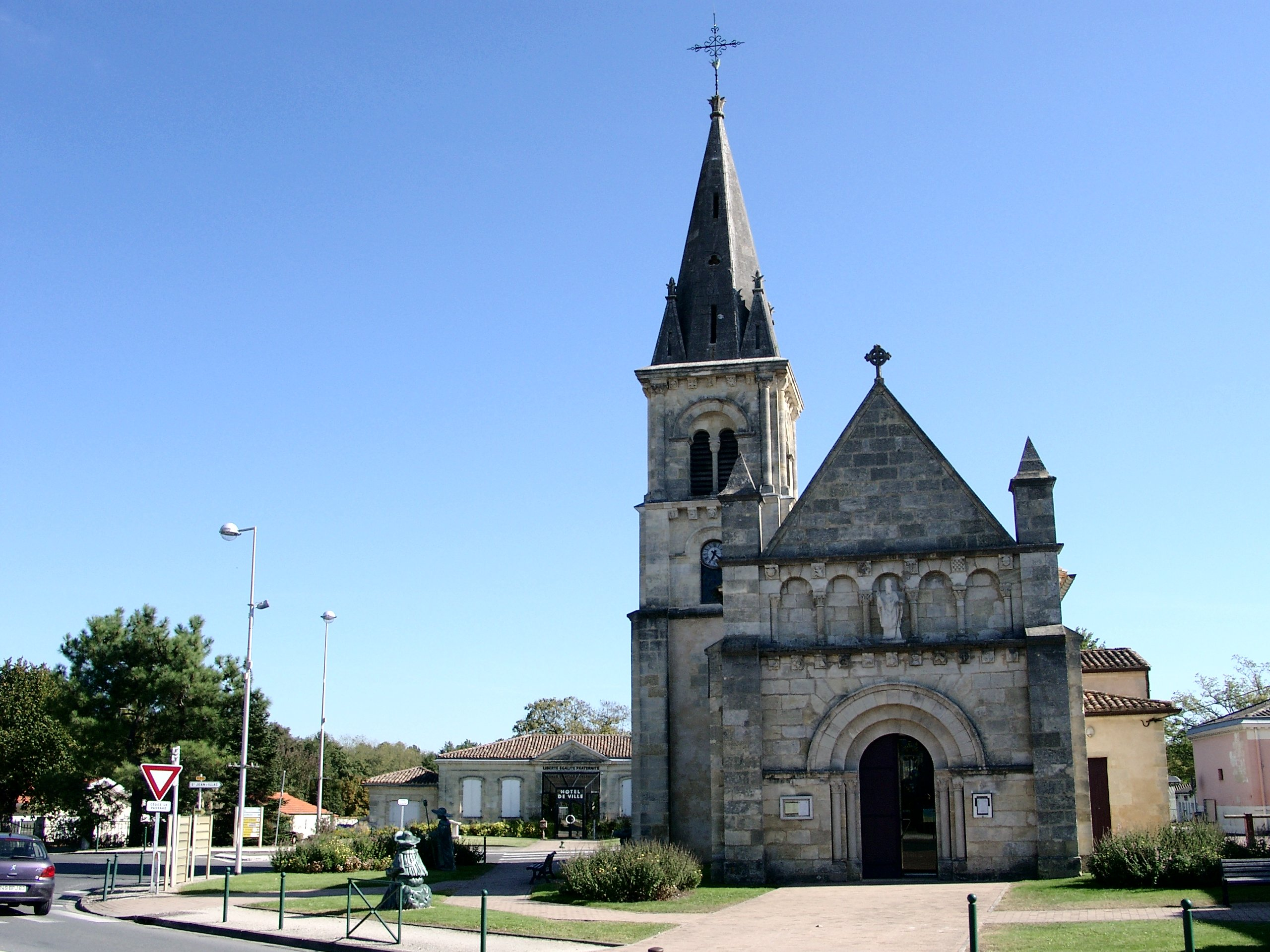
- The church in Martignas-sur-Jalle

- Coat of arms
- Location of Martignas-sur-Jalle
- Location within France Location within Nouvelle-Aquitaine
- Coordinates: 44°50′30″N 0°46′28″W
- Country: France
- Region: Nouvelle-Aquitaine
- Department: Gironde
- Arrondissement: Bordeaux
- Canton: Mérignac-2
- Intercommunality: Bordeaux Métropole

Government
  - Mayor (2020–2026): Jérôme Pescina
- Area^{1}: 26.39 km^{2} (10.19 sq mi)
- Elevation: 58 m (190 ft)
- Highest elevation: 46 m (151 ft)
- Lowest elevation: 22 m (72 ft)
- Population (2023): 8,056
  - Density: 305.3/km^{2} (790.6/sq mi)
- Time zone: UTC+01:00 (CET)
  - Summer (DST): UTC+02:00 (CEST)
- INSEE/Postal code: 33273 /33127
- ^{1} French Land Register data, which excludes lakes, ponds, glaciers > 1 km^{2} (0.386 sq mi or 247 acres) and river estuaries.

Martignas-sur-Jalle (French pronunciation: [maʁtiɲas syʁ ʒal]; Occitan: Martinhàs de Jalas) is a commune in the Gironde department, Nouvelle-Aquitaine, southwestern France. It is twinned with Aboyne, a village in Aberdeenshire, Scotland.

Historically, the town is known to have been the theater of the Battle of Martignas, where 500 to 600 longbowmen commanded by John Talbot were slaughtered by the French cavalry commanded by the Duke of Bourbon and the Count of Foix.

== Population ==
Historical population
Year	Pop.	±% p.a.
1968	994	—
1975	1,424	+5.27%
1982	3,726	+14.73%
1990	5,732	+5.53%
1999	5,574	−0.31%
2007	6,809	+2.53%
2012	7,313	+1.44%
2017	7,386	+0.20%
2023	8,056	+1.46%
Source: INSEE

== See also ==
- Communes of the Gironde department
