= Saint-Jacques-de-la-Lande =

Saint-Jacques-de-la-Lande Saent-Jaq (Gallo) Sant-Jakez-al-Lann (Breton)
- Commune
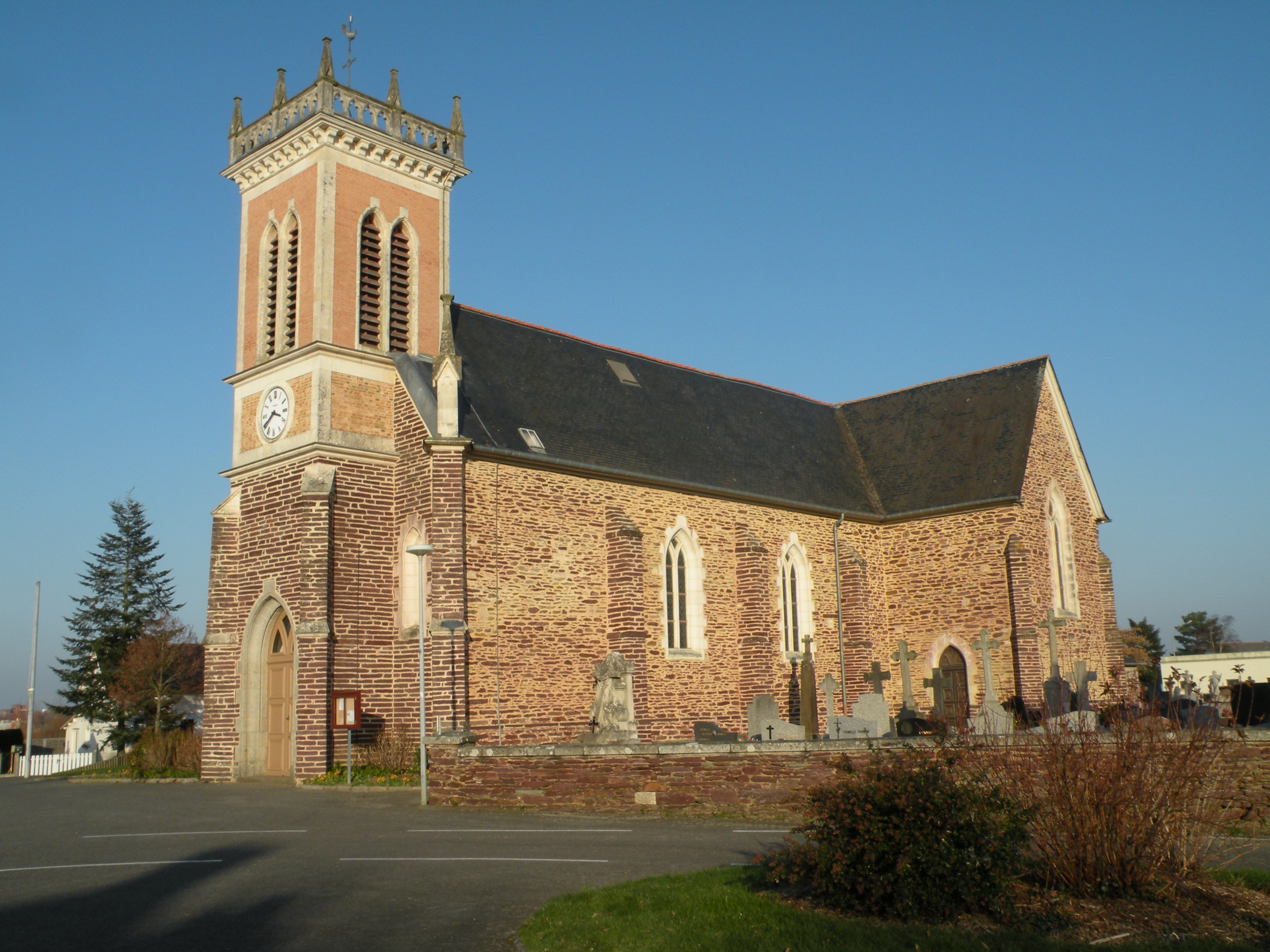
- Saint Jacques church
- Location of Saint-Jacques-de-la-Lande
- Location within France Location within Brittany
- Coordinates: 48°03′56″N 1°43′07″W
- Country: France
- Region: Brittany
- Department: Ille-et-Vilaine
- Arrondissement: Rennes
- Canton: Rennes-5
- Intercommunality: Rennes Métropole

Government
  - Mayor (2026–32): Sébastien Collet
- Area^{1}: 11.83 km^{2} (4.57 sq mi)
- Highest elevation: 47 m (154 ft)
- Lowest elevation: 18 m (59 ft)
- Population (2023): 13,800
  - Density: 1,170/km^{2} (3,020/sq mi)
- Time zone: UTC+01:00 (CET)
  - Summer (DST): UTC+02:00 (CEST)
- INSEE/Postal code: 35281 /35136
- ^{1} French Land Register data, which excludes lakes, ponds, glaciers > 1 km^{2} (0.386 sq mi or 247 acres) and river estuaries.

Saint-Jacques-de-la-Lande (French pronunciation: [sɛ̃ ʒak də la lɑ̃d]; Breton: Sant-Jakez-al-Lann; Gallo: Saent-Jaq) is a commune of Rennes Métropole in the Ille-et-Vilaine department of Brittany in northwestern France.

== Population ==
People from Saint-Jacques-de-la-Lande are called jacquolandins in French (also spelled jacolandins).

Historical population

Year	Pop.	±% p.a.
1793	788	—
1800	533	−5.43%
1806	731	+5.41%
1821	788	+0.50%
1831	829	+0.51%
1836	714	−2.94%
1841	772	+1.57%
1846	796	+0.61%
1851	907	+2.65%
1856	924	+0.37%
1861	901	−0.50%
1866	917	+0.35%
1872	930	+0.23%
1876	997	+1.75%
1881	1,037	+0.79%
1886	1,140	+1.91%
1891	1,170	+0.52%
1896	1,125	−0.78%
1901	1,101	−0.43%

Year	Pop.	±% p.a.
1906	1,056	−0.83%
1911	1,082	+0.49%
1921	1,240	+1.37%
1926	1,641	+5.76%
1931	1,812	+2.00%
1936	2,080	+2.80%
1946	2,205	+0.59%
1954	3,472	+5.84%
1962	4,637	+3.68%
1968	6,587	+6.03%
1975	6,881	+0.63%
1982	6,324	−1.20%
1990	6,189	−0.27%
1999	7,582	+2.28%
2007	9,732	+3.17%
2012	11,271	+2.98%
2017	13,087	+3.03%
2023	13,800	+0.89%

Source: EHESS and INSEE (1968-2023)

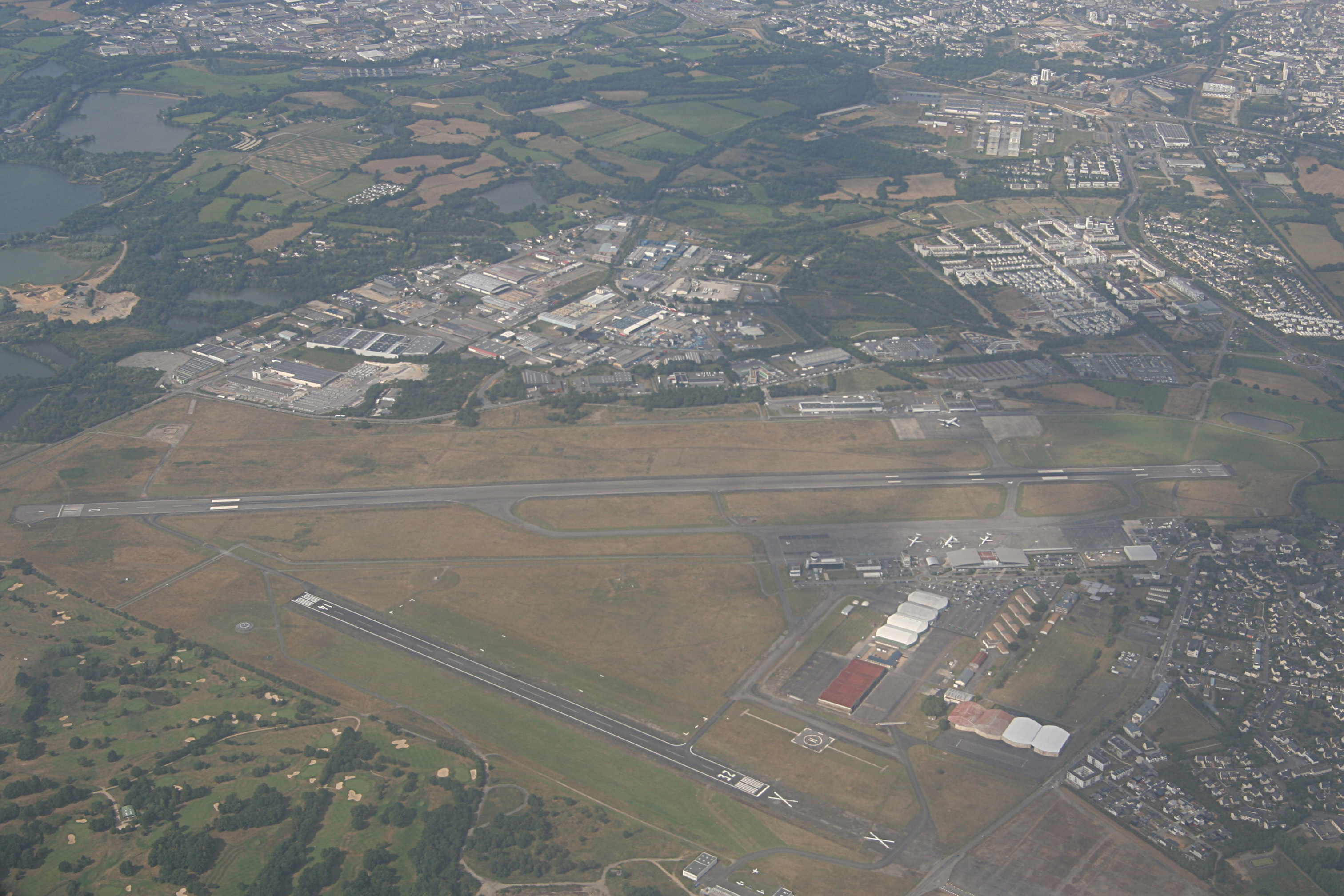
Rennes Airport is located in the commune

== See also ==
- Rennes - Saint-Jacques Airport
- Communes of the Ille-et-Vilaine department
