= 4th Airmobile Brigade =

4th Air Combat Brigade
- 4^{e} Brigade d'Aérocombat
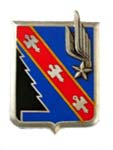
- Badge
- Active: 1999 - 2010 Since 2016
- Country: France
- Branch: French Army
- Type: ALAT
- Size: 4,400 men, 202 helicopters
- Part of: Commandement des Actions dans la Profondeur et du Renseignement
- Garrison/HQ: Clermont-Ferrand

The 4th Airmobile Brigade (French: 4^{e} Brigade Aéromobile, 4^{e} BAM) is a helicopter unit of the French Army. It makes up most of the French Army Light Aviation. The brigade is heir to the traditions and honours of the 4th Airmobile Division. The French Army announced that the brigade would be disbanded in 2010 and its constituent units placed directly under the command of the Land Forces Command. It was later announced, by the French Armed Forces, that the brigade would be re-establishedon July 1, 2016 as the 4th Air Combat Brigade (4e Brigade d'Aérocombat), headquartered at Clermont-Ferrand, directly subordinated to the COMALAT (the army aviation command) and including the 1st, 3rd and 5th Combat Helicopter Regiments.

== Composition ==
- 1^{er} Régiment d'Hélicoptères de Combat (1^{er} RHC) Combat Helicopter Regiment in Phalsbourg with 22 Gazelle, 20 Puma and 14 Cougar
- 3^{e} Régiment d'Hélicoptères de Combat (3^{e} RHC) Combat Helicopter Regiment in Étain with 37 Gazelle and 16 Puma
- 5^{e} Régiment d'Hélicoptères de Combat (5^{e} RHC) Combat Helicopter Regiment in Pau with 52 various Gazelle and Puma helicopters
- 9^{e} Régiment de Soutien Aéromobile (9^{e} RSA) Airmobile Support Regiment in Montauban
- 4^{e} Compagnie de Commandement de Transmissions et Soutien d'Aérocombat (4^{e} CCTSA) in Clermont-Ferrand

The 6^{e} Régiment d'Hélicoptères de Combat (6^{e} RHC) Combat Helicopter Regiment in Margny-lès-Compiègne was disbanded in July 2007. The airport has changed into civil status.
