= 5th Combat Helicopter Regiment =

- (5^{e} Régiment d'Hélicoptères de Combat) (5e RHC)
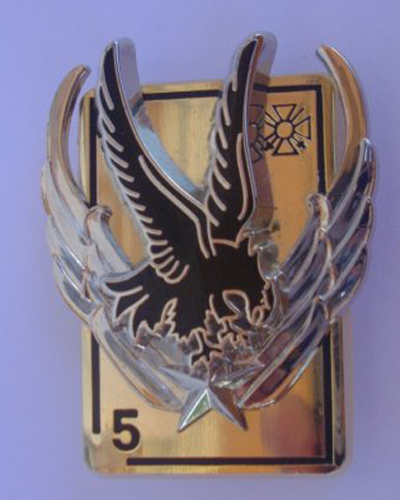
- Active: 1977-
- Country: France
- Branch: French Army Light Aviation
- Part of: 4th Air-Combat Brigade
- Garrison/HQ: Uzein, near Pau, Pyrénées-Atlantiques, France

Insignia
- Combat flag

The 5th Combat Helicopter Regiment (5^{e} Régiment d'Hélicoptères de Combat) (5e RHC) is a unit of the French Army. It is currently based at Uzein near Pau, Pyrénées-Atlantiques, and is equipped with Eurocopter Tiger HAP helicopters. The 5th Combat Helicopter Regiment took part in the 1991 Gulf War, transporting anti-tank infantry. The unit was deployed in Mali in 2019 as part of Operation Barkhane. On 25 November 2019 a Tiger from the unit collided with a Eurocopter AS532 Cougar transport helicopter, causing both aircraft to crash and killing all 13 on board.

== Early history ==
The 5th Combat Helicopter Regiment is the only army light aviation regiment based in the south-west of France and is also known as the Béarn regiment after the traditional province of that name. The regiment was established in 1977 but traces its history to the aircraft platoon attached to the 5th Armored Division, formed during the Second World War, and to the Second Helicopter Group that pioneered the use of helicopters in French North Africa in the post-war years. The regiment is the direct successor of the 11th Division's Light Aviation Group and inherits from it the jackdaw insignia of the French paratroopers, surrounded by wings denoting the light aviation aspect.

== Gulf War ==
The 5th Combat Helicopter Regiment was equipped with 48 helicopters in 1990. It formed part of the French brigade sent to participate in the 1991 Gulf War. The unit was embarked upon the aircraft carrier Clemenceau on 13 August for travel to Saudi Arabia as part of Opération Salamandre. Equipment taken included 30 SA342 Aérospatiale Gazelle light attack helicopters and a number of Aérospatiale SA 330 Puma transport helicopters. Part of the role of the 5th Combat Helicopter Regiment during the war was to transport air-mobile infantry armed with anti-tank weapons.

== Mali ==
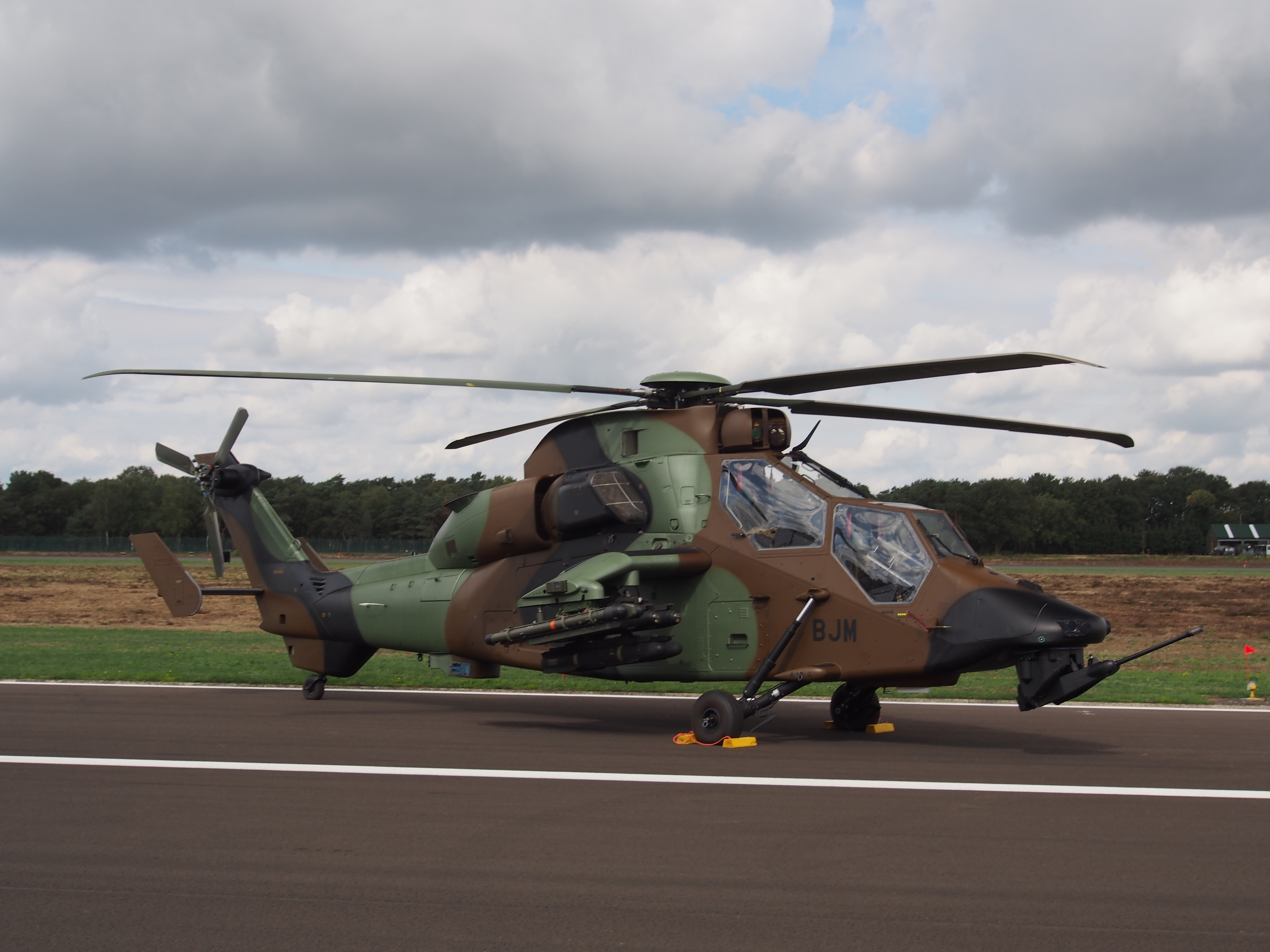
A 5th Combat Helicopter Regiment Tiger in Belgium, 2018

Since 5 July 2016 the 5th Combat Helicopter Regiment has formed part of the 4th Airmobile Brigade. The regiment deployed to Mali during Operation Barkhane against Islamist extremists. The unit deployed with the Eurocopter Tiger HAP (Hélicoptère d'Appui Protection, Support and Escort Helicopter).

On 25 November 2019 a helicopter from the unit was involved in the 2019 Ménaka mid-air collision during operations against a group of Malian insurgents. French Commando Paratroopers had engaged an Islamist unit and requested aerial support. Two Gazelle attack helicopters and one Eurocopter AS532 Cougar transport helicopter were dispatched from Ménaka and two Tigers from the 5th were sent from Gao. The night was moonless and the aircraft were operating in pitch-black conditions. One of the Tigers collided with the Cougar as it was circling the battlefield, both aircraft crashed. Both 5th Regiment pilots were killed and all five crew and six passengers on the Cougar were killed. A report blamed the collision on the lack of communication between the aviation units. The incident was the biggest single loss of French life in Operation Barkhane and the biggest loss of French troops in a single day since the 1983 Beirut barracks bombings.

== Recent events ==
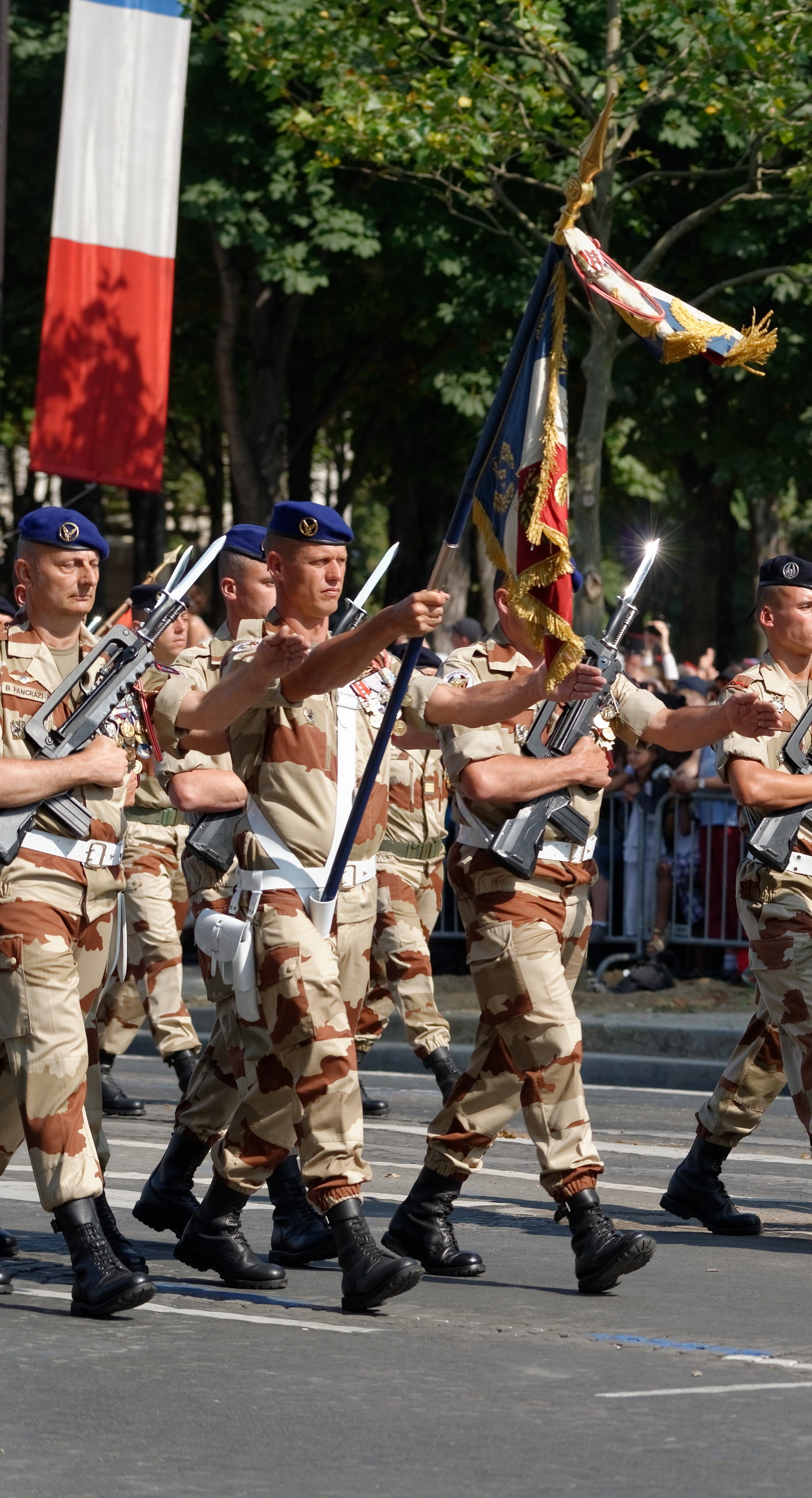
Colour and guard of the 5th RHC on Bastille Day parade, 2013

The 5th Combat Helicopter Regiment is currently based at Uzein, near Pau, Pyrénées-Atlantiques, in France. On 15 April 2020 two non-commissioned officers of the regiment were killed when a helicopter crashed during a rescue exercise near Bouilh-Devant in South-Western France. In September and October 2021 the unit took part in Cormoran 21, a joint French Army and Navy exercise in the Mediterranean Sea.

In 2022 the unit was deployed again to Operation Barkhane, operating in Niger and the Ivory Coast in support of French ground forces. The unit deployed helicopters to the Aspe Valley in October 2024 to retrieve farming equipment that had been stranded due to recent storms.
