= Base Lieutenant Étienne Mantoux =

Base Lieutenant Étienne Mantoux Étain-Rouvres Air Base
- Part of French Army
- Located near: Étain, Meuse, France
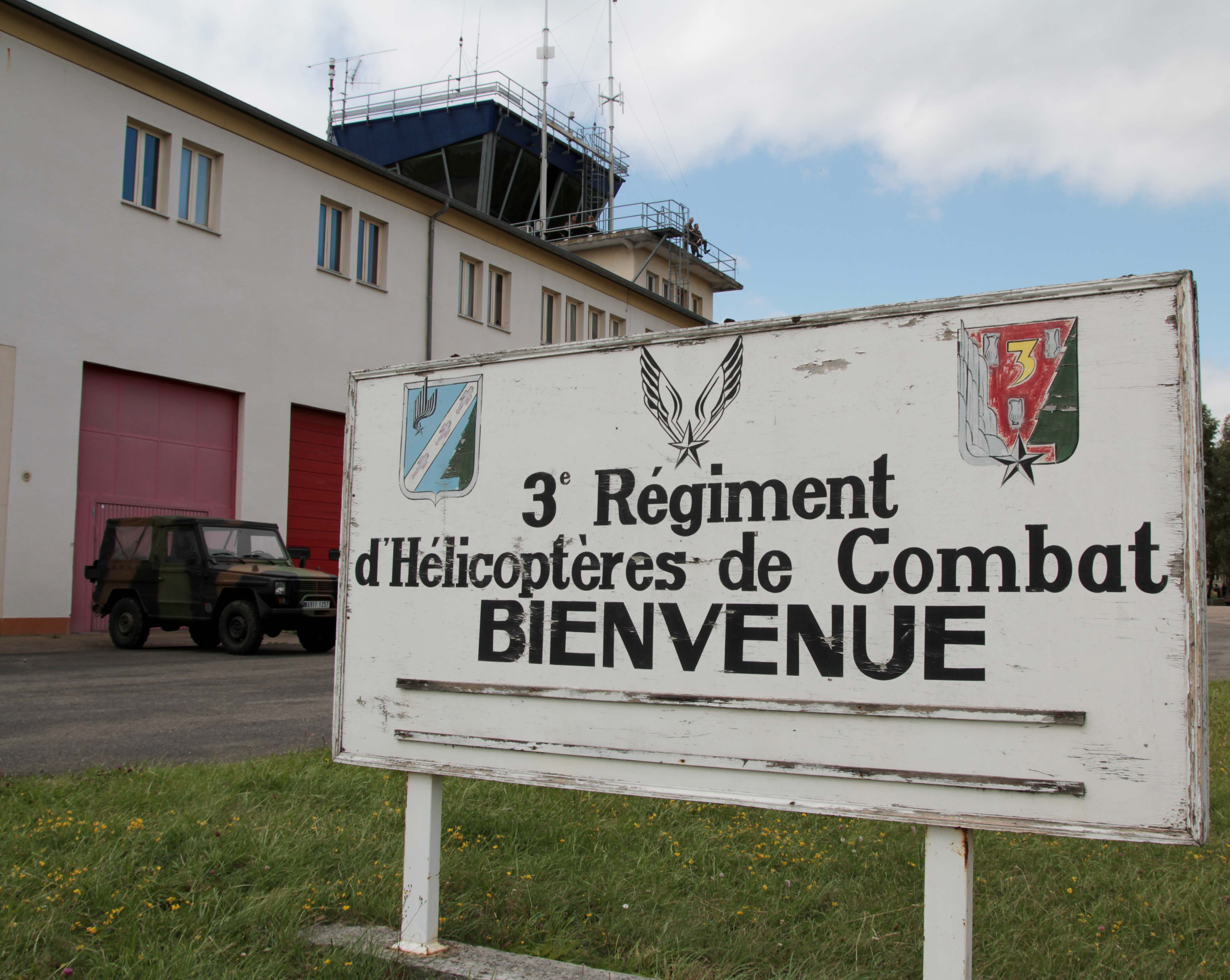
- 3e RHC base welcome sign, 2011

Site information
- Controlled by: Armée de Terre

Location
- Location of Base Lieutenant Étienne Mantoux, France
- Coordinates: 49°13′36″N 5°40′20″E

Site history
- Built: 1953
- In use: 1954-Present

Garrison information
- Garrison: 3e Régiment d'Hélicoptères de Combat (3e RHC)

Airfield information
- IATA: none; ICAO: LFQE

Summary
- Elevation AMSL: 766 ft (233 m)
- Interactive map of Airfield information

Runways
Direction	Length		Surface
Direction	ft	m	Surface
2/20	7,900	2,407	Concrete

Base Lieutenant Étienne Mantoux, formerly Étain-Rouvres Air Base (ICAO: LFQE) is a base of the French Army Light Aviation. It is located on the Lorraine Plateau in northeastern France, 1.5 kilometers (1 mile) west of Étain; on the west side of the Départemental 906 (D906) (Meuse) road, adjacent to the village of Rouvres-en-Woevre in the Meuse département about 19 kilometers (12 miles) east of Verdun. It was built in 1937 and has been used by the French, British, German, and U.S. Air Forces, before the French Army took the base over, after 1967.

== Origins ==
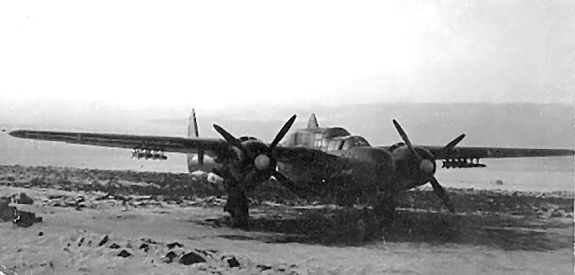
P-61 Black Widow with rockets installed at Étain-Rouvres Air Base, c. 1944.

Rouvres airdrome was built by the French Air Force in 1937. They flew Bloch-131 tactical reconnaissance aircraft. When World War II began, the Royal Air Force moved in flying Hawker Hurricanes of No. 73 Squadron RAF.

After the fall of France, the Luftwaffe used the base, flying Focke-Wulf Fw 190D fighters.

When the German Army was driven out by the U S Third Army in early September 1944, the airfield was put back into operational service by the United States Army Air Forces IX Engineer Command 926th Engineering Aviation Regiment. On 9 September the combat engineers arrived to lay down a temporary airfield to support the ground forces in their advance against enemy forces.

The 926th EAR laid down a 1,500-meter (5,000 ft) grass runway aligned roughly east–west (08/26), along with a small support area. The 7th Field Hospital was stationed here on 13 September 1944, where C-47 transports of the IX Tactical Air Command evacuated wounded to General Hospitals in the rear.

In late October 1944, the 825th Engineering Aviation Regiment returned to the airfield and began improvements, laying down an all-weather Pierced Steel Planking (PSP) runway for Ninth Air Force combat fighter use along with upgrading the support site with tents for billeting and also for support facilities; an access road was built to the existing road infrastructure; a dump for supplies, ammunition, and gasoline drums, along with a drinkable water and minimal electrical grid for communications and station lighting.

The United States Army Air Forces Ninth Air Force 362d Fighter Group used the captured airfield from 5 November 1944 until early April 1945. Its USAAF designation was A-82, Verdun/Etain Advanced Landing Ground (ALG). Three squadrons of P-47 "Thunderbolts" bombed and strafed such targets as flak positions, armored vehicles, and troop concentrations during the Battle of the Bulge. There was some controversy at the time as stationing a hospital and a combat unit on the same airstrip was a violation of the Geneva Conventions, but the 7th Field Hospital was not relocated until 15 Jan 1945 after Metz was taken.

The 362d received a Distinguished Unit Citation for action over the Moselle-Rhine River triangle. Despite the intense anti-aircraft fire encountered while flying armed reconnaissance in close cooperation with infantry forces in that area on 16 March 1945, the 362d hit enemy forces, equipment, and facilities, its targets including motor transports, armored vehicles, railroads, railway cars, and gun emplacements.

In addition P-61 "Black Widows" from the 416th and 425th Night Fighter Squadrons operated from Verdun/Etain until moving into occupied Germany in 1945. By mid-April the airfield had become redundant combat needs and the facility was returned to being a S&E (Supply and Evacuation) airfield, and was used until being closed on 22 May 1945. The wartime airfield was then turned over to French authorities.

In the immediate postwar years, the base was unused.

In May 1952 the Second World War airfield at Etain was proposed for expansion into a modern air base. An agreement was reached to redevelop Etain and to station United States Air Force tactical fighter-bombers there by the end of 1954. However, budget restrictions delayed major construction for about a year.

Although a base facility was ready for the USAF to use at the end of 1954, the facility was not ready for full acceptance until the summer of 1956 with the railroad spur into Etain not being completed until June 1955, and underground fuel storage was delayed until 1956.

== United States Air Force use ==
The first contingent of USAF personnel to Etain Air Base was Flight "C", 73rd Support Group (Depot) from Chateauroux-Deols Air Base on 1 February 1953. This advanced group was tasked with safeguarding USAF property and to coordinate construction activities. In addition, the 7005th Air Base Squadron was activated to bring the base up to operational status.

The first USAF unit to use Etan AB was the 388th Fighter-Bomber Wing, deploying to France from Clovis Air Force Base, New Mexico in December 1954. The 388th FBW's flying elements consisted of the 561st, 562d, and 563d Fighter-Bomber Squadrons, each equipped with North American F-86 Sabre (F models). The mission of the 388th FBW was to train for and conduct tactical nuclear weapons delivery.

=== 49th Fighter-Bomber Wing ===
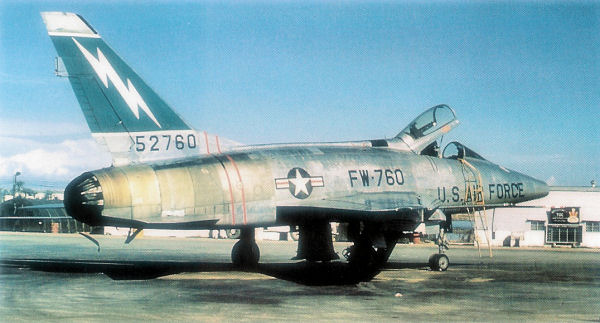
North American F-100D-40-NH Super Sabre Serial 55-2760 assigned to the 562d TFS/388th TFW, then to 7th TFS/49th TFW

Headquarters, 49th Fighter-Bomber Wing was assigned to Étain Air Base, absorbing the assets of the 388th FBW. The wing was relocated to France from Misawa Air Base, Japan.

=== U.S. Army ===
After the departure of the 49th TFW, the base was maintained by Detachment 1, 7514th Support Group, headquartered at Toul Air Base. Étain Air Base was put into a standby status by the USAF. U. S. Army units were moved onto the base from the Verdun area to relieve overcrowding there.

In the spring of 1960, Company C and Headquarters & Service Company of the 97th Engineer Battalion (Construction) relocated to the airfield from the Maginot caserne in Verdun. They provided general engineering services in the area including in Verdun, the old Maginot Line (NATO facilities), and in Etain. The 249th Engineer Battalion (Construction) also was assigned the base to build a railroad spur line to a munitions dump near the old World War I battlefield.

In late summer of 1965, the 249th relocated back to Germany while the 97th moved to Sidi Brahim Barracks in Étain town proper, freeing up the base for Air Force reserve use during the Berlin Wall crisis.

In addition to these Army units, some small USAF weather, civil engineering and postal squadrons were assigned to the base.

=== 1961 Berlin Crisis ===
After two years without any permanent flying units, on 5 September 1961 Étain Air Base was reactivated as part of Operation Tack Hammer, the United States response to the Berlin Crisis.

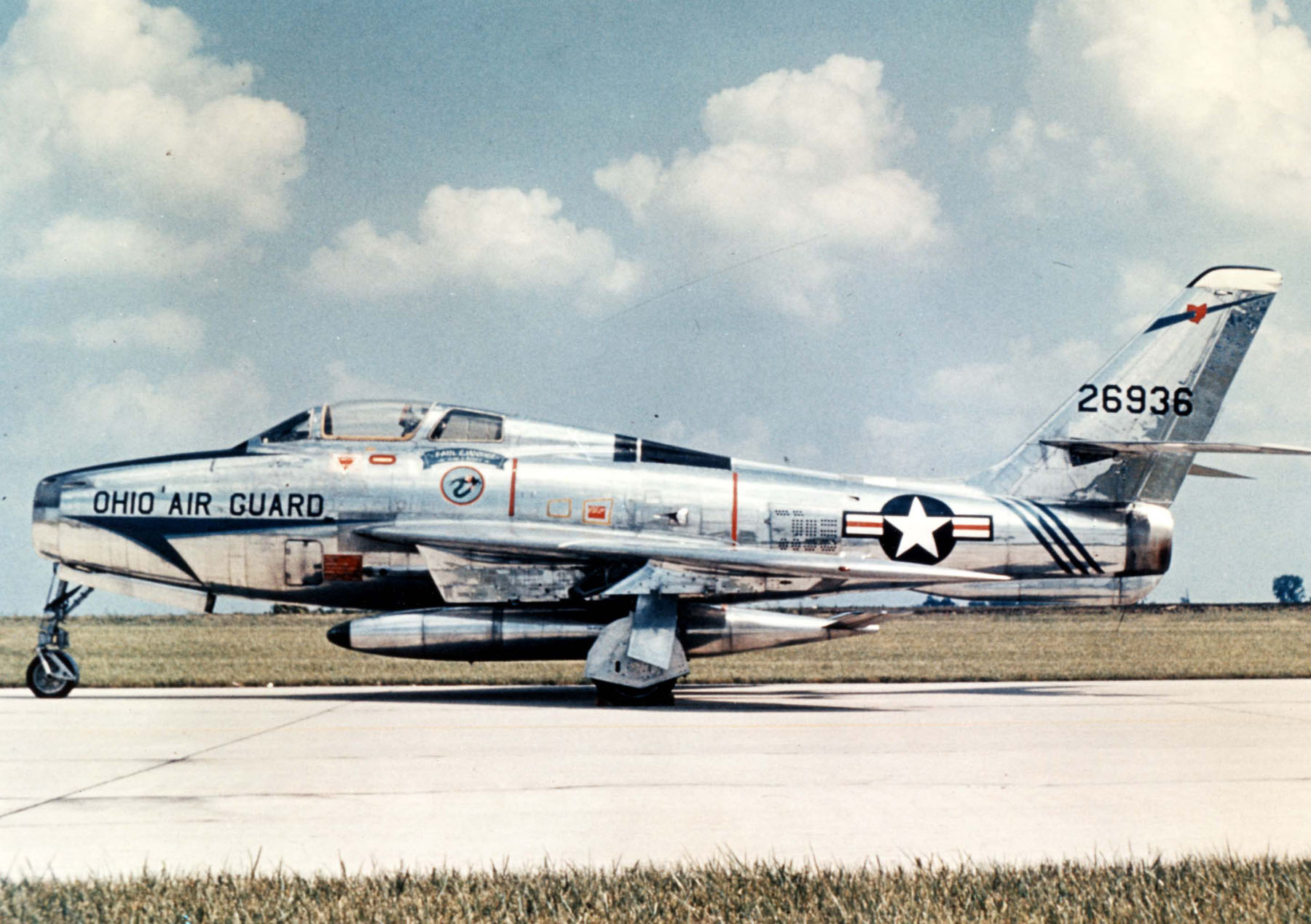
Former Ohio 166th TFS Republic F-84F-40-RE Thunderstreak, Serial 52-6526. Today, this aircraft is on permanent exhibit at the Museum of the United States Air Force Wright-Patterson AFB, Ohio

The 121st Tactical Fighter Wing of the Ohio Air National Guard were called to active duty for a period of twelve months on 1 October. When activated, the wing consisted of three operational units, the 162nd TFSquadron, based at Springfield Municipal Airport, Springfield Ohio; the 164th based at Mansfield-Lahm Municipal Airport, Mansfield Ohio, and the 166th based at Lockbourne AFB, Ohio. However, due to funding shortages, only 26 F-84Fs of 166th TFS was deployed to France, although several ground support units from the 162nd and 164th were also deployed.

On 4 November, the first ANG T-33 aircraft arrived at Etain, with the F-84s arriving on 16 November. On 11 December, the deployed units of the 121st TFW were redesignated the 7121st Tactical Wing. In July 1962 the deployed Air National Guardsmen were no longer needed in Europe and the 7121st began to redeploy its personnel to Ohio. All the aircraft and support equipment, however, remained at Etain to equip a new wing being formed there, the 366th Tactical Fighter Wing.

The last of the ANG personnel departed on 9 August 1962. The 7368th Combat Support Group was activated to operate the base after their departure.

=== 391st Tactical Fighter Squadron ===
The 366th Tactical Fighter Wing was a USAFE experiment. Wing Headquarters for the 366th was activated at Chaumont-Semoutiers Air Base on 8 May 1962, with 4 operational aircraft squadrons being equipped with the aircraft left behind by the deployed Air National Guard wings deployed to France as a result of the Berlin Crisis. The assets of the ANG 166th TFS at Etain were assigned to the 391st Tactical Fighter Squadron, with other squadrons being formed at Chambley, Phalsbourg and Chaumont Air Bases.

The ANG 166th TFS had transferred 25 F-84Fs to the 366th at Etain, and the squadron allocation was 20, 5 aircraft were transferred to Phalsbourg. In addition, several pilots from the 166th remained on active duty in France performed instructor duty for the new pilots being assigned to Etain.

The 366th TFW/391 TFS remained at Étain until 16 July 1963 when the 366th TFW moved to Holloman Air Force Base, New Mexico.

=== USAF closure ===
The 7368th CSG remained to maintain the base in a reserve status for the next several years. The No. 1 Wing RCAF (Royal Canadian Air Force) from Marville AB used Étain during May 1965 for NATO exercises, but otherwise the base remained largely unoccupied.

On 7 March 1966, French President Charles De Gaulle announced that France would withdraw from NATO's integrated military structure. The United States was informed that it must remove its military forces from France by 1 April 1967.

By 16 November, all American equipment was removed from the facility and on 15 March 1967 Étain Air Base was returned to the French.

== Current uses ==
After the USAF departed, Étain AB was taken over by the French Army as a helicopter base. It was renamed Base Lieutenant Étienne Mantoux. Currently, the 3rd Combat Helicopter Regiment (3 RHC) operates from the base and flies SA341, SA342, SA 342L1 and 342M1 VIVIANE "Gazelles", and SA 330 "Pumas". About 1000 soldiers serve with the regiment, which has participated in operations in Côte d'Ivoire, the Balkans, Indonesia, Lebanon, and Chad. The 3rd RHC will be the first numeric regiment of the brigade with systems as SIR and SIT.

The base is well-maintained and has been expanded over the years and remains a front-line French military installation.
