= N18 =

N18 may refer to:

== Roads ==
- N18 road (Belgium), a National Road of Belgium
- Route nationale 18, in France
- N18 road (Ireland)
- A18 motorway (Netherlands)
- N18 (South Africa)
- Nebraska Highway 18, in the United States

== Other uses ==
- BMW N18, an automobile engine
- Chronic kidney disease
- HMS Triumph (N18), a submarine of the Royal Navy
- London Buses route N18
- Nissan Almera (N18), a Japanese automobile
- Nitrogen-18, an isotope of nitrogen
- Tinak Airport, on Arno Atoll, Marshall Islands
- N18, a postcode district in the N postcode area
