= 2019 Ménaka mid-air collision =

Aviation accident in Mali

Mid-air collision
- Date: 25 November 2019
- Summary: Collision in darkness (human factors)
- Site: Liptako sector, near Ménaka, Mali; 15°52′01″N 1°30′46″E
- Total fatalities: 13
- Total survivors: 0

First aircraft
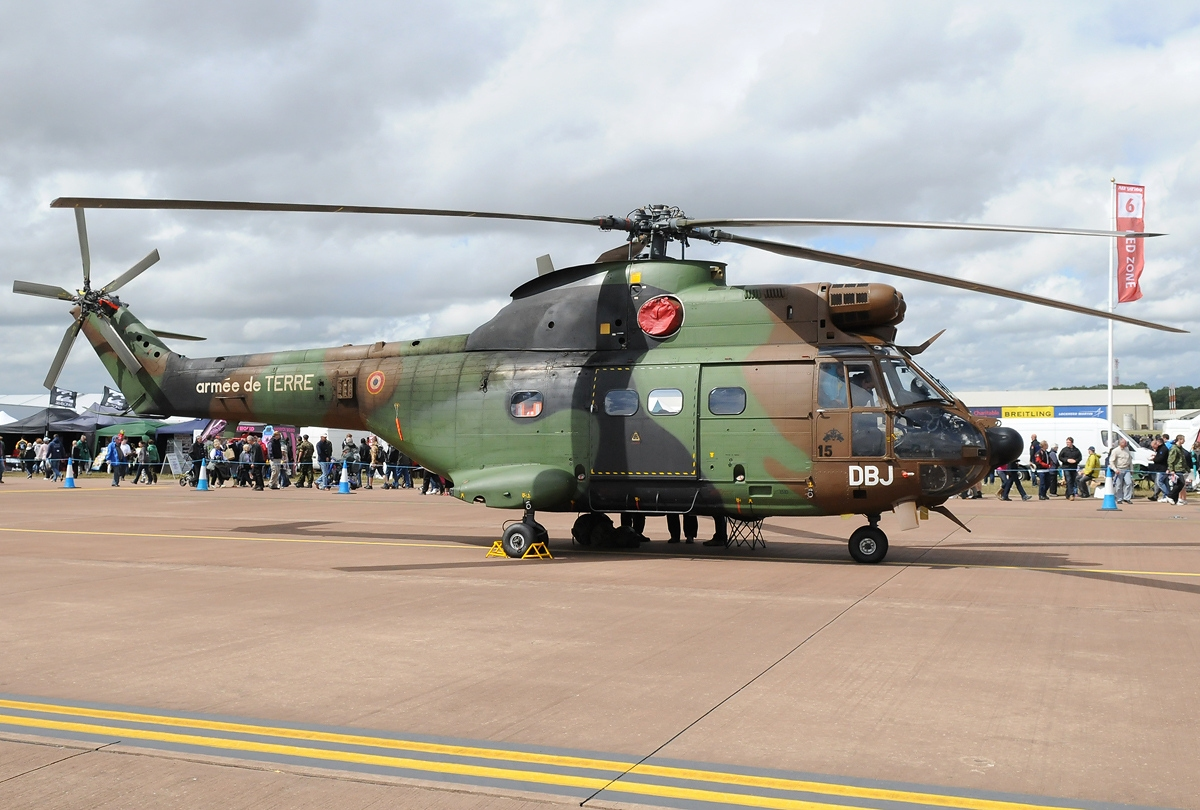
- A Eurocopter AS532 Cougar similar to the one involved
- Type: Eurocopter AS532 Cougar
- Operator: French Army Light Aviation (5e RHC)
- Call sign: Celtic
- Registration: F-MCGE
- Flight origin: Ménaka, Mali
- Destination: Combat zone (Eranga Valley)
- Occupants: 11
- Passengers: 6 (Mountain Commando Group)
- Crew: 5
- Fatalities: 11
- Survivors: 0

Second aircraft
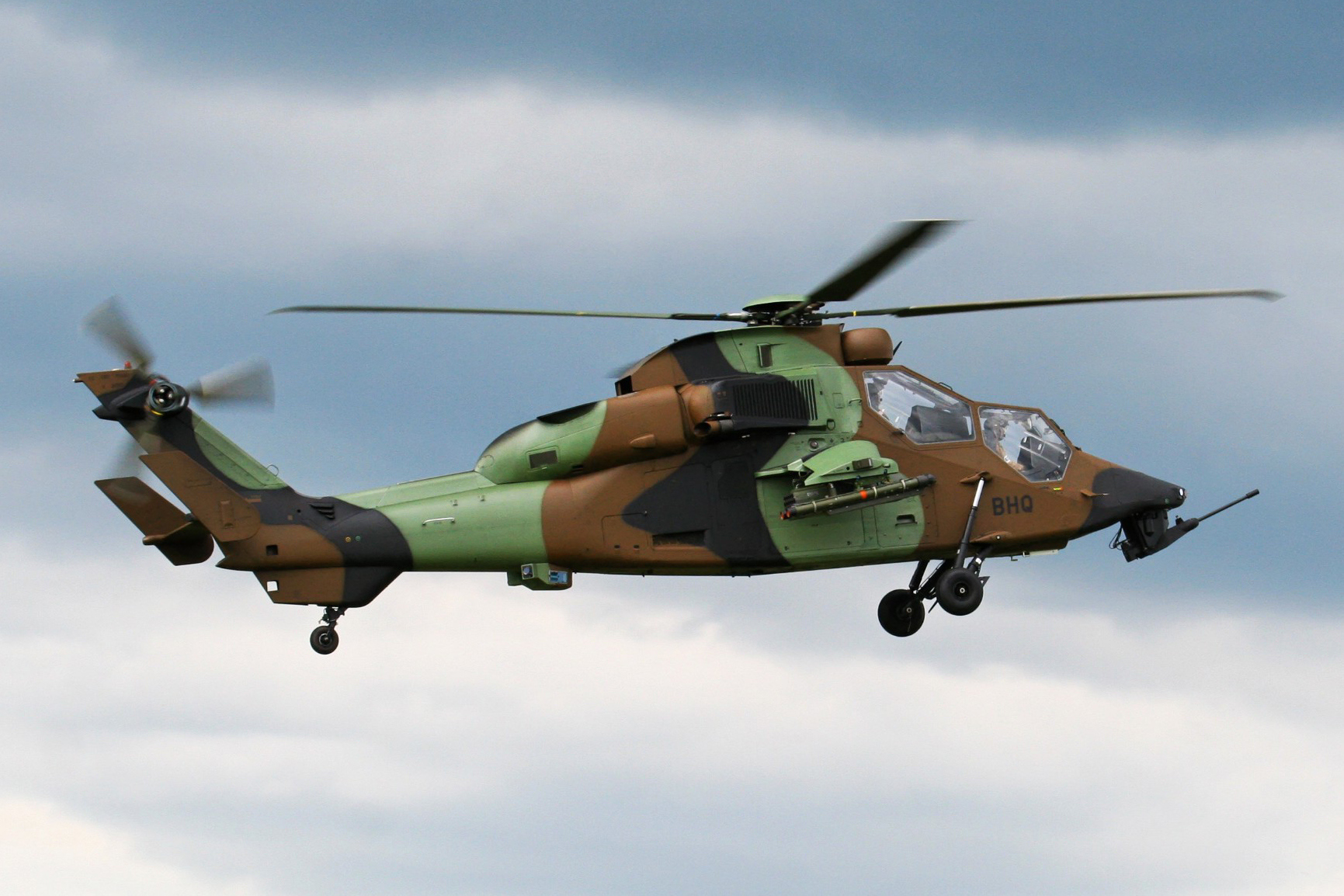
- A Eurocopter Tiger similar to the one involved.
- Type: Eurocopter Tiger (F-MBJQ)
- Operator: French Army Light Aviation (5e RHC)
- Crew: 2
- Fatalities: 2
- Survivors: 0

On 25 November 2019, two French Armed Forces helicopters, a Eurocopter AS532 Cougar and a Eurocopter Tiger which were part of Operation Barkhane, collided in mid-air over northern Mali, this collision resulted in the deaths all 13 soldiers who were in both helicopters.

It was the deadliest incident involving the French military since the 1983 Beirut barracks bombings.

Three days later, the Islamic State in West Africa made a statement claiming to have caused the crash, which was denied the following day by Chief of Staff General François Lecointre

== Background ==
In November 2019, the city of Indelimane and its surroundings, located between Ansongo and Ménaka, were the scene of numerous clashes. The region was then one of the Islamic State's areas of action in the Sahara. On November 1, at least 49 Malian soldiers were killed in a jihadistic attack on the military base in the city. On November 2, an LAV escorting a convoy between Gao and Ménaka ran into an improvised explosive device 20 kilometers from Indelimane: a French soldier was killed. On November 16, about 20 kilometers south of Indelimane, GCP commandos carried out an attack on a camp: five Islamic State jihadists were killed and a French commando was seriously injured during the fighting.

== Incident ==
On November 22, 2019, the French army launched a large-scale operation in the Eranga Valley, located about twenty kilometers south of Indelimane.

On November 25, late in the day, French forces launched an attack in the Liptako Gourma region against jihadists traveling in pick-ups and motorcycles. Around 5 p.m., GCP soldiers clashed with the jihadists. As night fell, they requested air support to cross the Wadi. Two Tiger helicopters and a Cougar, as well as a patrol of two Mirage 2000s, were mobilized. At approximately 19:40, while maneuvering in complete darkness (moon illumination under 1%), the Tiger (callsign "Gazelle 1") and the Cougar (callsign "Celtic") collided at an altitude of approximately 1,000 meters (3,300 ft). Neither crew detected the other due to the lack of collision avoidance systems and the degraded visual environment caused by dust from the ground combat. The crash left no survivors. Thirteen French soldiers, including seven from the 5th Combat Helicopter Regiment (5° RHC), and six operators from the Groupement de commandos de Montagne, were killed.

== Aftermath ==
On November 28, the Islamic State in West Africa claimed to have provoked the crash that had occurred three days earlier: "the soldiers of the caliphate fired in the direction of the helicopter, forcing it to retreat and eventually colliding with another helicopter, resulting in the death of thirteen soldiers."

The next day, General François Lecointre, the Armed Forces' chief of staff, denied that jihadist fire had caused the collision: "This is absolutely incorrect. [...] There was no attack by the jihadists, [who were] being chased and marked in a certain way on the ground. And so there was no withdrawal of a plane in the face of jihadist fire."

== Casualties ==
Six officers and a master corporal were among the 13 fatalities. One of those killed, Pierre-Emmanuel Bockel, was the son of French Senator Jean-Marie Bockel. Bockel was the pilot of the 'Cougar' helicopter.

On December 2, France gave them a national tribute in the courtyard of the Hôtel des Invalides. President Emmanuel Macron presented them with the posthumous Legion of Honor.

== Investigation ==
On 30 January 2021, the French military air accident investigation bureau (BEA-É) released its final report (T-2019-15-A) on the crash. The investigators ruled out mechanical failure or enemy fire, attributing the collision to organizational and human factors.

The report highlighted that the crews were operating in "complete darkness" (Moon illumination < 1%) and had erroneous situational awareness of each other's positions. The investigation noted that the pilots were focused on ground maneuvers in a high-intensity combat zone and failed to detect the converging trajectories. The report also emphasized that French military helicopters were not equipped with collision avoidance systems at the time, relying on "see and avoid" procedures which were ineffective in the degraded visual environment.
