= Maginot =

Maginot (English: /ˈmæʒɪnoʊ/, French: [maʒino]) is a French surname of Lorraine origin which may refer to:

- André Maginot (1877–1932), French civil servant, soldier, and Member of Parliament
- Maginot Barracks, military installation in France
- Maginot Line, a line of concrete fortifications in France named after André Maginot
  - List of Maginot Line ouvrages
- La rue du Sergent-Maginot, a street in Paris
- La place André-Maginot, a square in Nancy, France
- Double crime sur la ligne Maginot, a French-language film released in 1937
- Maginot, a fictional deep space research vessel in the TV series Alien: Earth
