= Petitcollin =

French toy manufacturer

- Industry: chemical industry manufacture of games and toys
- Founded: Étain, France (1860)
- Founder: Nicolas Petitcollin
- Headquarters: Étain, France
- Key people: Yvan Lacroix
- Products: Dolls and toys
- Revenue: 636 693 €
- Number of employees: 9

Petitcollin is a French toy manufacturing company in Étain, France, established in 1860. It started manufacturing its iconic baby dolls in 1912.

It is the last French factory of Swimmers, Poupons and traditional dolls still operating. It still manufactures the plastic version of the swimming doll Petit Collin, production of which began around 1924-26.

== History ==
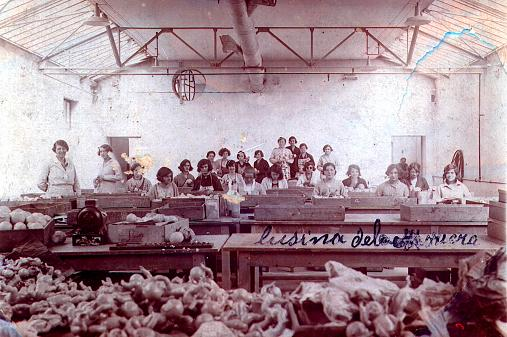
The Petitcollin factory floor.

In the early 1800s, Nicolas Petitcollin, the company's founder, manufactured horn combs in Étain, Meuse, France. Since 1864, the company has been headquartered in Paris. Nicolas Petitcollin began working in celluloid in the late 1800s. In 1901, the company adopted an eagle's head logo, which it retains to this day. It has been listed on the Paris Stock Exchange since November 27, 1906. It began manufacturing dolls in 1912.

During World War I, the factory in Étain was completely destroyed. Nonetheless Petitcollin thrived during the interwar period. Around 1924-1926, the Petitcollin company innovated by launching on the market a baby doll which can be bathed, the swimming doll "Petit Collin". With the arrival of polyester resins, Petitcollin decided to specialize in manufacturing objects made from the material. In 1961 it became the first French manufacturer of polyester resin helmets, operating from a rebuilt factory in Étain.

In 1995, Vilac acquired the company, which became known as SARL Jouets Petitcollin. The factory has been open to the public since 1998. It is the only operational doll factory in France; the company was given the Label Entreprise du partimoine vivant (Living Heritage Company label) by the French government in 2007.

The association of local authorities around Étain built a museum dedicated to the brand; it opened in September 2009. On October 19, 2009, the French post office emitted a dolls stamps collection. A Petitcollin swimming doll appeared on one of them.
