= 3rd Combat Helicopter Regiment =

- (3^{e} Régiment d'Hélicoptères de Combat) (3e RHC)
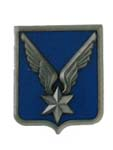
- Active: 1 August 1977 - Present
- Country: France
- Branch: French Army Light Aviation
- Part of: 4th Air-Combat Brigade
- Garrison/HQ: Étain-Rouvres Air Base

The 3rd Combat Helicopter Regiment (3^{e} Régiment d'Hélicoptères de Combat) (3e RHC) is located in Étain with 33 Gazelle, 16 Puma.

== History ==
The regiment was created on 1 August 1977. It is located at Base_Lieutenant_Étienne_Mantoux, formerly known as the American occupied Étain Air Base. The regiment is heir by descent of the Aviation Platoon of the 9th Colonial Infantry Division, later transformed into the 3rd, then 23rd Aerial Artillery Observation Group (GAOA). On 3rd RHC's banner inscribed "Indochina 1947–1954", the colors of the ribbon of the Médaille militaire, with the olive-colored ribbon of the Military Cross for overseas operations and six citations. The 23rd GAOA totalled 34,500 flight hours.

== Structure ==
Today the regiment consists of 11 squadrons:

- Airmobile Support Battalion (BAA)
  - Command and Logistics Squadron (ECL)
  - Aerodrome Service Squadron (ESA)
  - Defense and Protection Squadron (EDP) (= Reservists)
- Reconnaissance and Attack Helicopter Battalion (BHRA)
  - 3 reconnaissance and attack helicopter squadrons (EHRA 1, 2 and 3)
  - 1 light helicopter maintenance squadron (EMHL)
- Battalion of Maneuver and Assault Helicopters (BHMA)
  - 2 squadrons of maneuvering helicopters (EHM 1 and 2)
  - 1 maneuver helicopter maintenance squadron (EMHM)
