= Pyrenees Airport =

Pyrenees Airport may refer to:

- Pau Pyrénées Airport, an airport serving Pau, France, located 10 km northwest of Pau
- Tarbes - Lourdes Pyrenees Airport, a small regional airport located 9 km south-southwest of Tarbes, near Lourdes, France
