= Sidi Brahim Barracks =

Former army barracks in Étain, France

Coordinates: 49.2067°N 5.6466°E

Sidi Brahim Barracks (French: Caserne Sidi Brahim) is a former army barracks in Étain, France, just off highway N3 to Metz.

The name Sidi Brahim comes from a tomb located in western Algeria near the Moroccan frontier. On September 21, 1845, a detachment of men from the 8th Chasseurs d'Orléans and some attached individuals fought a large force of Berber tribesmen twenty times their number near that location. The fight lasted 3 days as the French struggled to escape. In the end only a handful survived. The battle lent its name to their marching song and later to a French veterans' organization that sprung up.

A couple of original buildings on Sidi Brahim Barracks

A barracks named after Sidi Brahim was located just blocks from the center of Étain. It was given this name in honor of the French Chasseurs à pied (French: light infantry) that were stationed there in 1913 and 1914 until shortly before the Germans arrived. In 1916 the battalion was commanded by one of the great heroes of the Battle of Verdun, Lieutenant Colonel Driant. When the German attack began they were located at Cavres near Fort Douaumont and received the first onslaught. Within days the unit was annihilated and the commander killed, but the delay helped save the French army. Their name is legend in France.

The barracks was rebuilt after World War I for the French 6th military district and served in that capacity until the Germans returned in 1940. The premises were badly damaged when the U.S. 3rd Army under General Patton was pinned down here for some months in 1944 after running out of fuel nearby. They were fiercely attacked by the retreating German army and were immobilised in and around Sidi Brahim until the Battle of the Bulge three months later.

For a while after the war the base was home for the French Army’s 702nd Material Company. In 1950 it was transferred to the U.S. Army and was occupied by various small units as the Cold War developed. In 1957 the 55th Transportation Company was transferred here from Busac France to haul jet fuel and gasoline to bases in France and Germany. In 1961 it was the home of the 82nd Transportation Company when two companies from the 97th Engineer Battalion (Construction) were relocated there at the beginning of the Berlin Wall Crisis. The base remained in American hands until 1967, when it reverted to French control.

Sidi Brahim Barracks is no longer an active military base and is being used as a civilian industrial area (See 2004 photo of portion of base).

== See also ==
- Base Lieutenant Étienne Mantoux
