= French Army Light Aviation =

Army aviation service of the French Army

- Aviation légère de l'armée de Terre
- Founded: 22 November 1954
- Country: France
- Type: Army aviation
- Size: 339 aircraft (2014)
- Part of: French Army

Commanders
- Current commander: Général de division Bertrand Vallette d’Osia since 14 August 2019.

The French Army Light Aviation (French: Aviation légère de l’armée de Terre, ALAT, lit. 'Land Army Light Aviation' (the army is officially called the 'Land Army' because the air force is officially called the 'Air Army')) is the Army aviation service of the French Army. ALAT was established on 22 November 1954 for observation, reconnaissance, assault and supply duties.

== History ==
In 1912, the French military aviation was formally incorporated into the French Army, alongside the four longstanding divisions of the French Army, namely infantry, cavalry, artillery, and engineers. As such it played important role in WWI in support of the army : observation, artillery guidance, bombing and strafing, etc. but it also proved the air to be a battleground in itself, prompting the detachment of French Air Force from the army in 1934. After WWII, it was felt that, just like the navy, the army needed its own air branch, distinct from the air force, which led to ALAT's creation in 1954.

Since it has participated in almost all French military engagements and humanitarian aid deployments: the French Indochina War, the Algerian War, the Persian Gulf War of 1990–91, the Lebanese conflict, the war in Chad, the independence of Djibouti, the War in Somalia, operations in Bosnia-Herzegovina, the Kosovo War, the Indonesian occupation of East Timor, the Opération Licorne in Côte d'Ivoire, the humanitarian response to the December 2004 Indian Ocean earthquake and tsunami, the War in Afghanistan, 2011 military intervention in Libya.

The use of armed helicopters coupled with helicopter transport during the Algerian War which could drop troops into enemy territory gave birth to today's tactics of airmobile warfare. The machines of the nascent ALAT carried out a considerable number of missions against Algerian insurgents between 1955, when the Groupe d’Hélicoptères No.2 (GH 2) was created, and 1962 when the French empire in Algeria finally came to an end. GH 2 was based at Sétif – Aïn Arnat in the east of the country, and it was equipped primarily with machines to undertake transport missions, though the Vertol H-21C, nicknamed the Banane volante (“Flying Banana”) because of its silhouette, would soon join the unit owing to concerns about the lack of machines which could both defend themselves and carry out offensive missions against the insurgents. Acquiring these machines lay in the hands of the licensee Piasecki given France's urgent need to have them on account of the circumstances. Usually, the H-21 could carry up to 18 troops, yet local operating (as well as climatic) conditions decreed that the French army examples could carry only up to around 12 troops each. In two years, GH 2 received the vast majority of the H-21s acquired by ALAT, which consisted of five squadrons by the end of 1958. A sixth squadron from the French naval air arm, the Aéronautique navale, had operated with GH 2 for little more than a year.

From 1955 to 1962, GH 2 took part in the major battles, which occurred near the frontier between Algeria and Tunisia, including the battle of Souk-Ahras in April 1958. The helicopters, including types such as the H-21, the Alouette II, the Sikorsky H-19 and Sikorsky H-34, together aggregated over 190,000 flying hours in Algeria (over 87,000 for the H-21 alone) and helped to evacuate over 20,000 French combatants from the combat area, including nearly 2,200 at night. By the time the war in Algeria had ended, eight officers and 23 non-commissioned officers from ALAT had given their lives in the course of their duties.

After the American experiments coupling attack helicopters with anti-tank missiles during the last phases of the Vietnam War, and during NATO maneuvers, the ALAT worked to create specialized units in this area to fight against the threat of armoured Warsaw Pact assaults.

In 1975, ALAT had 500 officer s, 2500 NCOs and 3500 other ranks, or 2% of the French Army. Quantitatively, its fleet is one hundred aircraft, Cessna L-19 gradually retired and replaced by helicopters and 560 helicopters (190 Alouette II, 70 Alouette III, 130 SA.330 Puma and 170 SA.341 Gazelle plus 110 SA.341 to deliver.

Qualitatively, after delivery of orders, there are 360 light helicopters including 170 Gazelle reconnaissance helicopters 180 anti-tank which 110 Gazelle HOT (these missiles entering service until 1978 ) and 140 utility helicopters Puma. ALAT flew 170,000 flying hours, including 11,000 at night.

== Aircraft ==
ALAT is currently suffering from aging equipment and inadequate training of its crews, which has caused various incidents. According to a report of the National Assembly of 2007 'the potential of the primary aircraft has in fact decreased sharply since 2004, with the decline to accelerate in 2008. In 2005, after a long wait, the ALAT received its first Eurocopter EC665 Tiger. These aircraft are the first helicopters designed and developed in France specifically designed for combat. 80 aircraft have been ordered to replace cannon and Mistral-armed SA341 Gazelles, delivery of the final aircraft is expected to be in 2020. On 15 April 2011, 30 helicopters were delivered to the ALAT, including 16 combat capable.

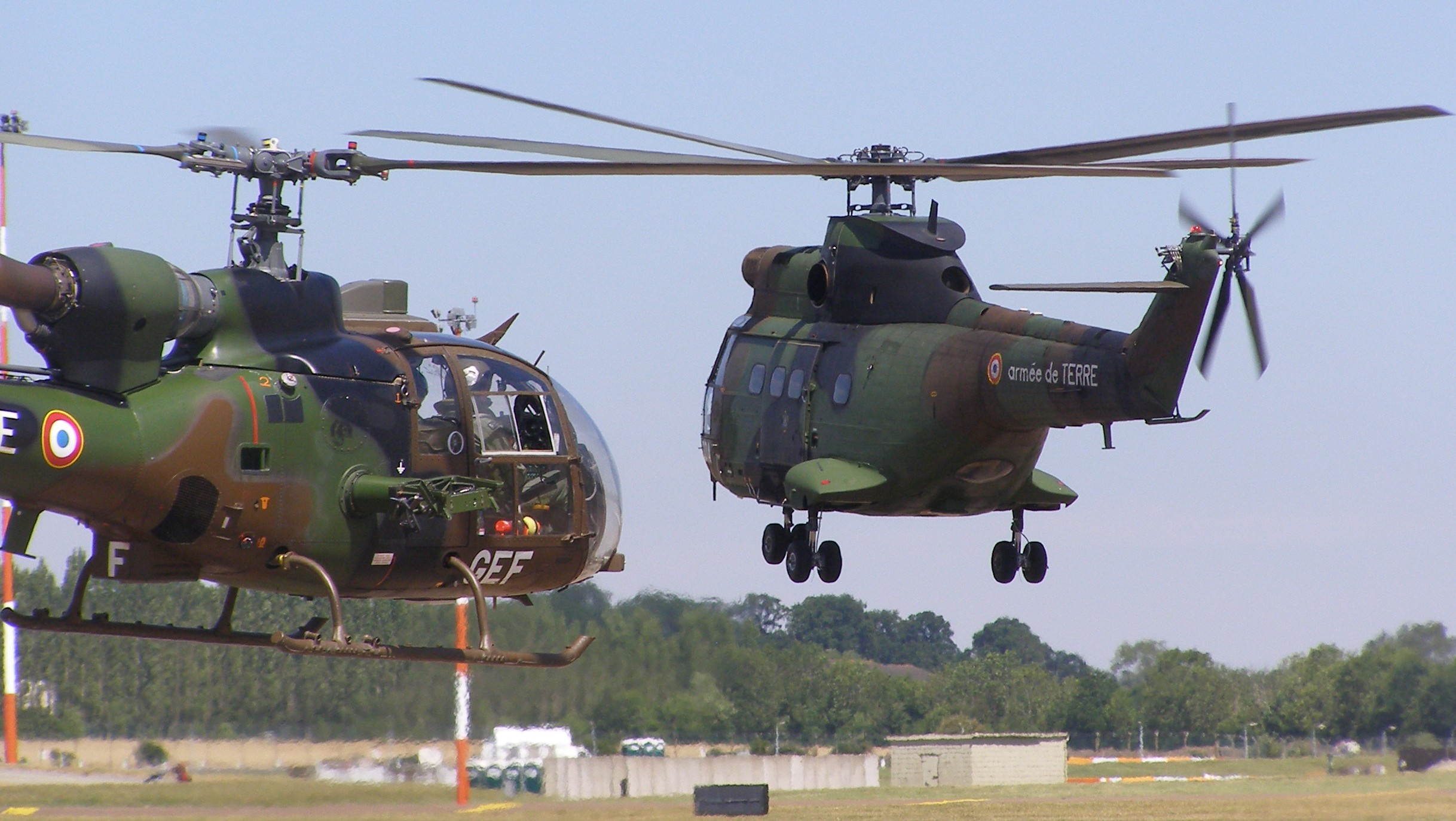
Gazelle and Puma

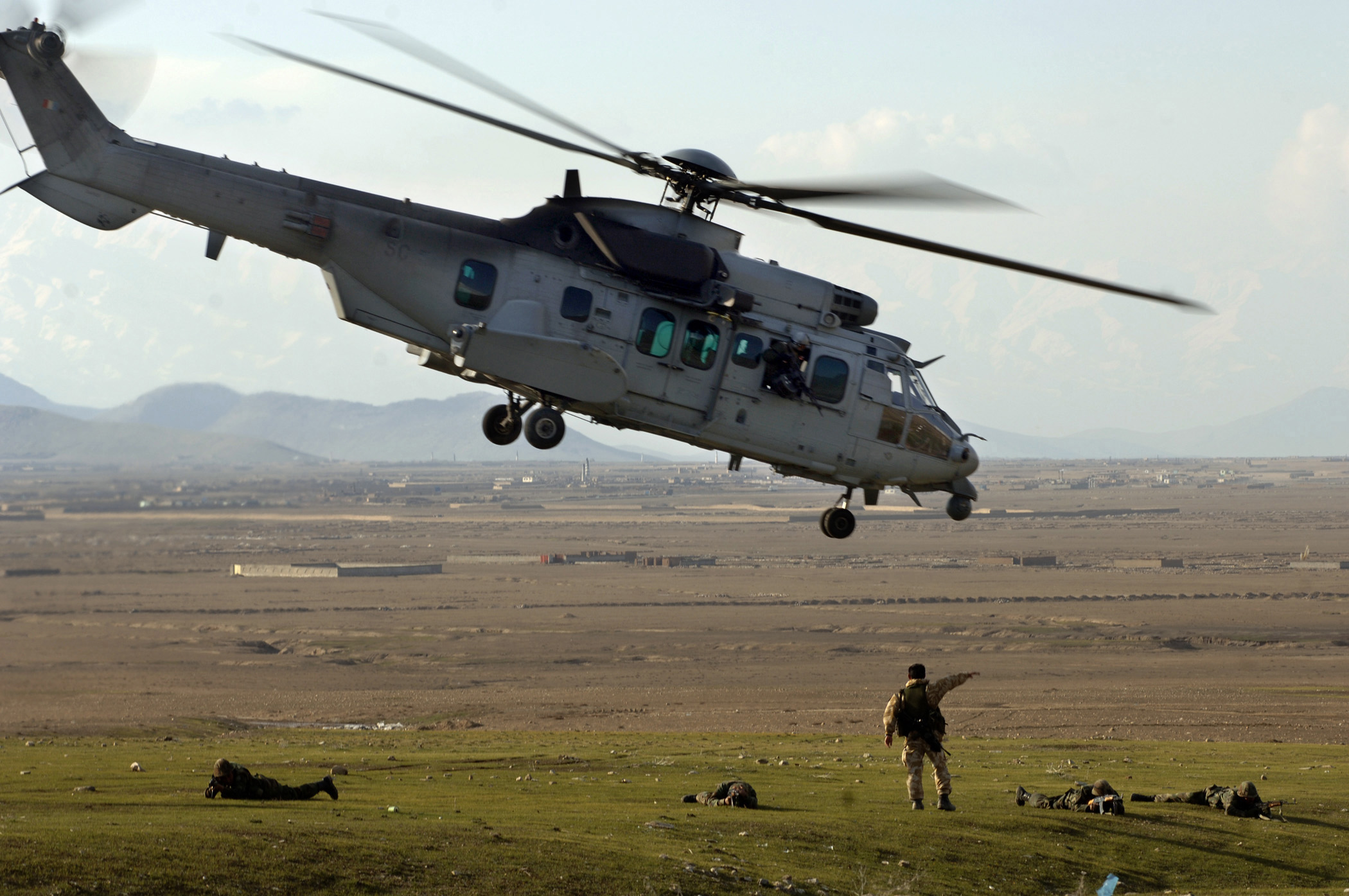
Eurocopter Cougar

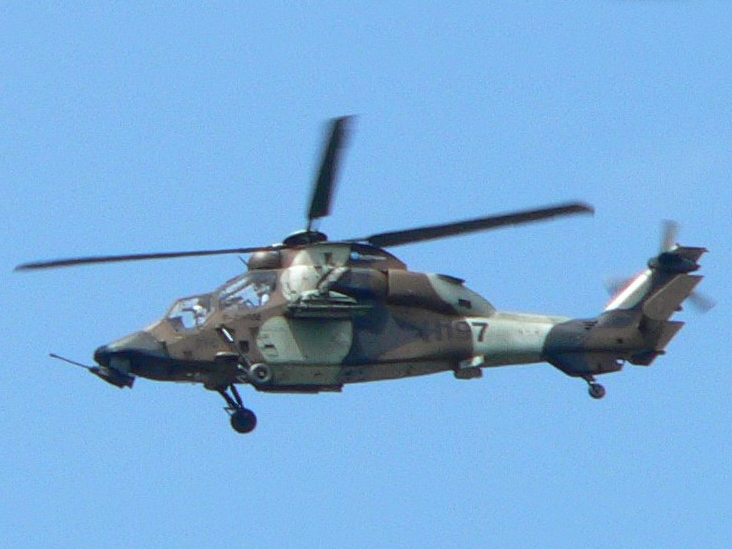
Eurocopter Tiger attack helicopter

== Structure ==
Since July 2025 :

=== Commandement de l'Aviation Légère de l’Armée de Terre - Army Light Aviation Command ===
Based in Metz.

- Détachement avions de l'Armée de terre (DAAT) - Army Planes Detachment in Saint-Jacques-de-la-Lande.
- École de l'Aviation légère de l’Armée de terre (EALAT) - Army Light Aviation School, in Le Cannet-des-Maures
  - Base École Général Lejay (BAGL) - School Base, in Le Cannet-des-Maures
  - Base École Général Naveley (BAGN) - School Base, in Dax
  - École franco-allemande de formation des équipages Tigre (EFA Tigre) - Franco-German Tiger Training School, in Le-Cannet-des-Maures
  - Centre de formation inter-armées NH90 (CFIA NH90) - NH90 Training Centre, in Le-Cannet-des-Maures
  - Centre de formation franco-allemand pour le personnel technico-logistique Tigre (CFA PTL), Franco-German Tiger Logistic Training Centre in Faßberg (Germany)

==== 4e Brigade d'Aérocombat - 4th Air-Combat Brigade ====
Based in Clermont-Ferrand. Former 4e Division Aéromobile.

- 4^{e} Compagnie de Commandement de Transmissions et Soutien d'Aérocombat (4^{e} CCTSA) - Air-Combat Command Signals and Support Company in Clermont-Ferrand
- 1^{er} Régiment d'Hélicoptères de Combat (1^{er} RHC) - Combat Helicopter Regiment in Phalsbourg
- 3^{e} Régiment d'Hélicoptères de Combat (3^{e} RHC) - Combat Helicopter Regiment in Étain
- 5^{e} Régiment d'Hélicoptères de Combat (5^{e} RHC) - Combat Helicopter Regiment in Pau
- 9^{e} Régiment de Soutien Aéromobile ( 9^{e} RSAM) - Airmobile Support Regiment in Montauban

=== Other units ===
- 4e Régiment d'Hélicoptères des Forces Spéciales (4e RHFS) - Special Forces Helicopter Regiment in Pau part of French Army Special Forces Command
  - Groupe Interarmées d'Hélicoptères (GIH) - Joint Helicopters Group in Vélizy-Villacoublay Air Base
- Groupement Aéromobilité de la Section Technique de l'Armée de Terre (GAMSTAT) - Army Technical Section Airmobile Group in Chabeuil
- Détachement ALAT de Djibouti (part of 5th Overseas Interarms Regiment)

Other now dissolved regiments include the 2nd Combat Helicopter Regiment, the 4th Command and Maneuver Helicopter Regiment (4e Régiment d'Hélicoptères de Commandement et de Manœuvre), the 6th Combat Helicopter Regiment and the 7th Combat Helicopter Regiment.
