= Route nationale 18 =

Road in north eastern France

The route nationale 18 (RN18) is a trunk road (nationale) in north east France. The RN 18 was constructed in 1959.

== Étain to Longwy (0-49km) ==
The road begins at Étain at a junction with the N3, heads north to Longuyon and then turns northeast to Longwy where the road meets the N52. There the road forks as the D918: the north fork crosses the frontier to Belgium (N830) and the eastern fork enters Luxembourg as the N5.
