= 1st Combat Helicopter Regiment =

- (1^{er} Régiment d'Hélicoptères de Combat) (1er RHC)
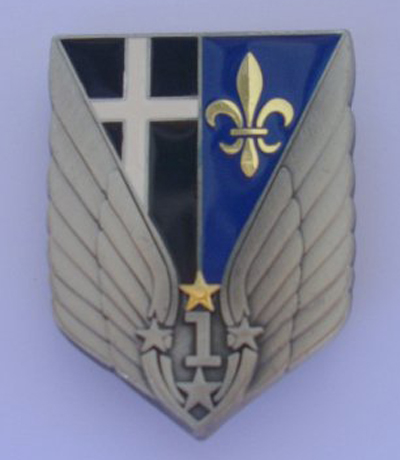
- Active: 1 August 1977 - Present
- Country: France
- Branch: French Army Light Aviation
- Part of: 4th Air-Combat Brigade
- Garrison/HQ: Quartier La Horie (Phalsbourg)
- Motto(s): PRIMUS PRIMORUM (Le premier parmi les premiers)

Commanders
- Current commander: Lieutenant-colonel Fernando Hervé

Insignia
- Combat flag

The 1st Combat Helicopter Regiment (1^{er} Régiment d'Hélicoptères de Combat) (1er RHC) is based at Quartier La Horie, in Phalsbourg.

== History ==
The 1st Combat Helicopter Regiment was created on 1 August 1977, but traces its origins back to the 1950s. It carries the traditions of the 1st then the 21st Artillery Observation Groups which achieved particular fame during the First Indochina War, winning six citations. The 1st Aerial Artillery Observation Group was established on 20 November 1945, and became the 21st Aerial Artillery Observation Group on 1 October 1950. From 1945 to February 1946 it was stationed at Camp de Valdahon. It was dissolved on 31 December 1953. (Note: 1° Groupe aérien d'observation d'artillerie – 1st GAOA – 21st GAOA. Mis sur pied au camp de Valdahon le 20 novembre 1945, embarque à Marseille le 1 Décember on the "Boissevin" . It arrived at Saïgon on 18 December. Devant faire mouvement sur le Tonkin, a détachement est embarqué au Cap-Saint-Jacques, on the French aircraft carrier Béarn and arrived en baie d'Along on 7 March 1946. Le 10, le détachement s'installe à Cat Bi, l'aérodrome d'Haiphong, et perçoit son premier Morane 500. Au 1 May la situation du 1st GAOA was as follows: the 1st escadrille was stationed à Tourane with four Morane, the 2nd escadrille à Seno avec quatre Morane, and the 3rd escadrille at Haiphong with four Morane. Cette dernière s'installe à Hanoï. Les effets du décret du 3 mars 1952, créant officiellement l'ALOA.)

That heritage is recalled by the inscription "Indochina 1946–1954" carried on the standard which was solemnly presented to the regiment on 27 June 1980. Camp de la Horie at Phalsbourg where the regiment is stationed was built on the basis of the former Phalsbourg-Bourscheid Air Base, vacated in the 1960s by the United States Air Force. The base was constructed by French workers for the Americans in 1953. Cited in an army order, the régiment received the Croix de guerre des Théâtres d'opérations extérieures with palm on 11 July 1991. It has been awarded battle honours for Kuwait. (Note: Koweït 1990–1991"Edition Chronologique n° 45 du 29 octobre 2010".Le Ministère de la Défense instruction n°1515/DEF/EMA/OL/2 du 23 septembre 1983, modifiée, sur les filiations et l'héritage des traditions des unités; décision n°010318/DEF/CAB/SDBG/CPAG du 15 juillet 2008 portant création d'une commission des emblèmes. Art. 1. L'incription "Koweït 1990–1991" est attribuée aux flags et standards formations des armées énumérated below. 2nd Foreign Infantry Regiment, 1st Foreign Cavalry Regiment, 1st Foreign Engineer Regiment, 3rd Marine Infantry Regiment, 1st Marine Infantry Parachute Regiment, 11th Marine Artillery Regiment, 4th Régiment de dragon, 1st Spahi Regiment, 6th Command and Support Régiment, 1st R.H.C, 3rd R.H.C, as well as formations of the French Air Force (5th, 7th, 11th de Chasse, 11th Reconnaissance, 61^{e}, 62^{e} de Transport). Le présent arrêté sera publié au bulletin officiel des armées, Hervé Morin.)

In 1990 the 1st RHC took part in Opération Daguet (Operation Brocket) in Iraq. It has also seen service in Chad, in Djibouti, in Somalia, in the former Yugoslavia, in Kosovo, in Timor, in Ivory Coast and in Afghanistan.

== Organization ==
The regiment is divided into 3 battalions:

- The airmobile support battalion with
  - 1 aerodrome services squadron;
  - 1 command and logistics squadron;
  - 1 defense and protection squadron of reservists.
- The reconnaissance and attack helicopter battalion with:
  - 1 squadron of reconnaissance and attack helicopters using Aérospatiale Gazelle Viviane
  - 2 attack destruction squadrons using Eurocopter Tigre HADs
  - 1 Tigre/Gazelle helicopter maintenance squadron.
- The maneuver and assault helicopter battalion with:
  - 2 squadrons of maneuver and assault helicopters using NHIndustries NH90 TTH Caïmans;
  - 1 squadron of maneuver and assault helicopters using Aérospatiale SA 330 Pumas
  - 1 Caïman/Puma helicopter maintenance squadron.

== Commanding officers ==
Rank	Commanding officer	Dates
Colonel	Georges Baffeleuf	1 August 1977 – 24 August 1978
Lieutenant-colonel	André Martini	25 August 1978 – 23 June 1981
Lieutenant-colonel	Alain Pfister	24 June 1981 – 15 November 1981 (+)
Chef de bataillon	François Durand	16 November 1981 – 11 January 1982
Lieutenant-colonel	Hugues Archambeaud	12 January 1982 – 21 June 1984
Lieutenant-colonel	Marcel Morvan	22 June 1984 – 25 June 1986
Lieutenant-colonel	Armel Davout d'Auerstaedt	26 June 1986 – 29 June 1988
Lieutenant-colonel	Michel Massou	30 June 1988 – 28 June 1990
Lieutenant-colonel	Jean-Luc Hotier	29 June 1990 – 25 June 1992
Lieutenant-colonel	Roch Le Neven	26 June 1992 – 30 June 1994
Lieutenant-colonel	Michel Foudriat	1 July 1994 – 30 June 1996
Lieutenant-colonel	Patrick Tanguy	1 July 1996 – 30 June 1998
Lieutenant-colonel	Hugues Brastel	1 July 1998 – 30 June 2000
Lieutenant-colonel	Patrick Lefebvre	1 July 2000 – 25 June 2002
Lieutenant-colonel	Pascal Guichard	26 June 2002 – 30 June 2004
Lieutenant-colonel	Michel Grintchenko	1 July 2004 – 30 June 2006
Lieutenant-colonel	Hervé Auriault	1 July 2006 – 31 July 2008
Colonel	Alain Bayle	1 August 2008 – 31 May 2010
Lieutenant-colonel	Thibault de Laforcade	1 June 2010 – 25 June 2012
Colonel	Frédéric Barbry	26 June 2012 – 26 June 2014
Colonel	Frédéric Beutter	26 June 2014 – 28 June 2016
Colonel	Simon de Fautereau	28 June 2016 – 28 June 2018
Lieutenant-colonel	Fernando Hervé	28 June 2018 –
