= Uzein =

- Commune
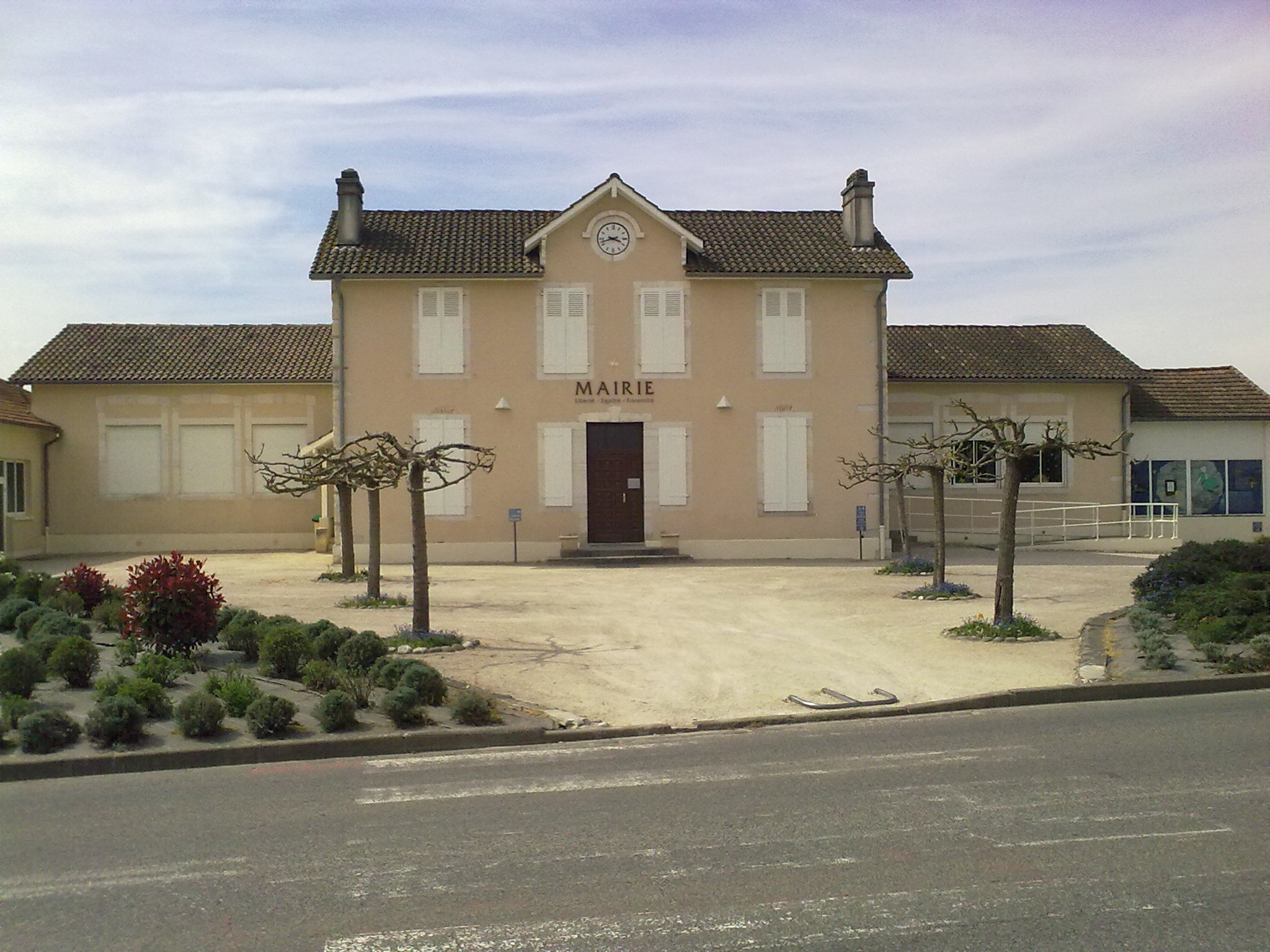
- Town hall
- Location of Uzein
- Location within France Location within Nouvelle-Aquitaine
- Coordinates: 43°24′01″N 0°25′54″W
- Country: France
- Region: Nouvelle-Aquitaine
- Department: Pyrénées-Atlantiques
- Arrondissement: Pau
- Canton: Lescar, Gave et Terres du Pont-Long
- Intercommunality: CA Pau Béarn Pyrénées

Government
  - Mayor (2020–2026): Éric Castet
- Area^{1}: 16.19 km^{2} (6.25 sq mi)
- Elevation: 150 m (490 ft)
- Highest elevation: 186 m (610 ft)
- Lowest elevation: 142 m (466 ft)
- Population (2023): 1,326
  - Density: 81.90/km^{2} (212.1/sq mi)
- Time zone: UTC+01:00 (CET)
  - Summer (DST): UTC+02:00 (CEST)
- INSEE/Postal code: 64549 /64230
- ^{1} French Land Register data, which excludes lakes, ponds, glaciers > 1 km^{2} (0.386 sq mi or 247 acres) and river estuaries.

Uzein (French pronunciation: [yzɛ̃]; Occitan: Usenh) is a commune in the Pyrénées-Atlantiques department in south-western France.

== See also ==
- Pau Pyrénées Airport
- Communes of the Pyrénées-Atlantiques department
