= Étain, Meuse =

Étain
- Commune
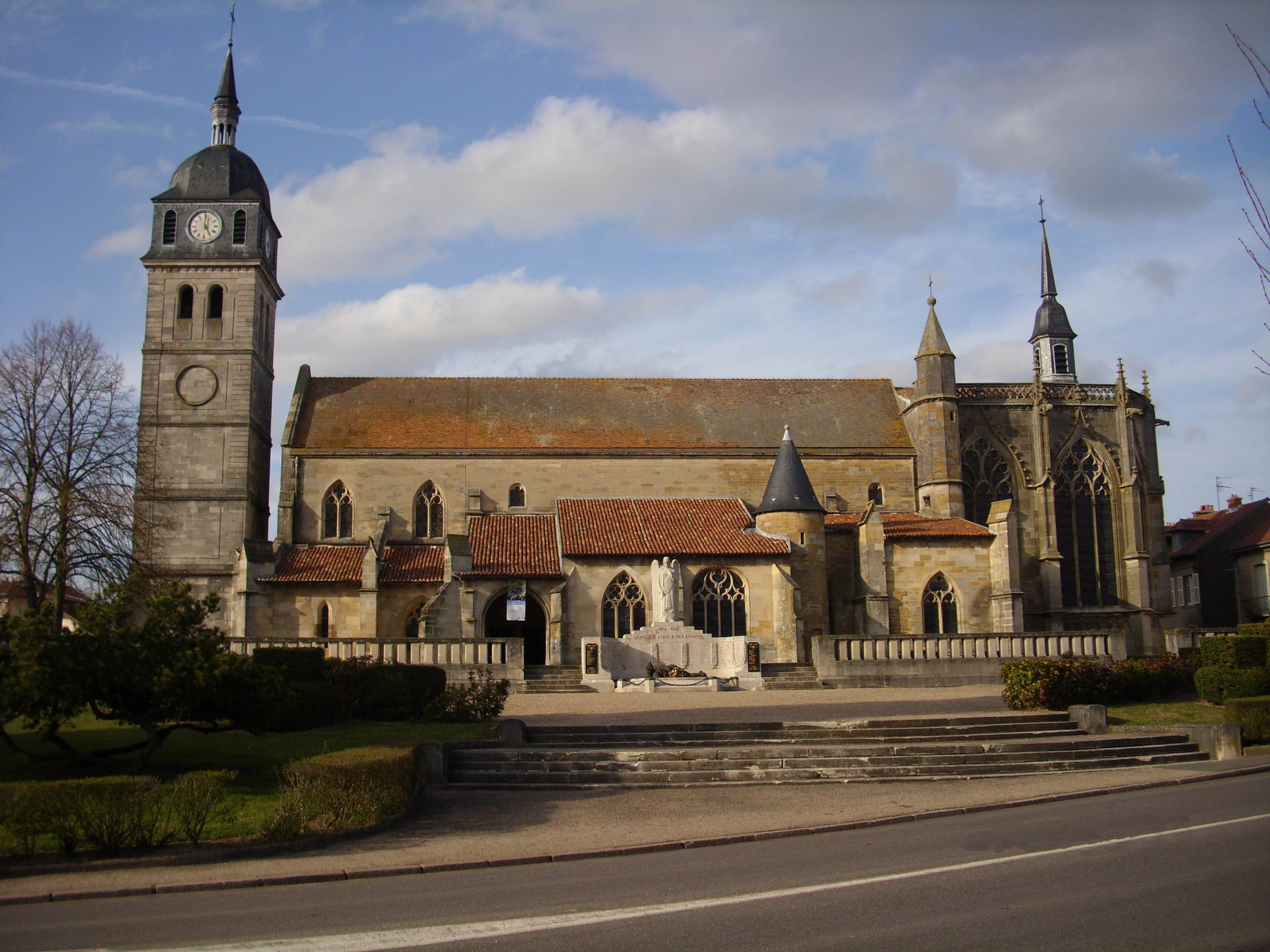
- St. Martin's Church

- Coat of arms
- Location of Étain
- Location within France Location within Grand Est
- Coordinates: 49°12′58″N 5°37′48″E
- Country: France
- Region: Grand Est
- Department: Meuse
- Arrondissement: Verdun
- Canton: Étain
- Intercommunality: Pays d'Étain

Government
  - Mayor (2020–2026): Rémy Andrin
- Area^{1}: 19.64 km^{2} (7.58 sq mi)
- Elevation: 210 m (690 ft)
- Highest elevation: 236 m (774 ft)
- Lowest elevation: 196 m (643 ft)
- Population (2023): 3,375
  - Density: 171.8/km^{2} (445.1/sq mi)
- Time zone: UTC+01:00 (CET)
  - Summer (DST): UTC+02:00 (CEST)
- INSEE/Postal code: 55181 /55400
- ^{1} French Land Register data, which excludes lakes, ponds, glaciers > 1 km^{2} (0.386 sq mi or 247 acres) and river estuaries.

Étain (French pronunciation: [etɛ̃]) is a commune in the Meuse department in Grand Est in north-eastern France.

== Geography ==
Étain is situated on the river Orne, approximately 19 km (12 mi) to the east north east of Verdun.

== History ==
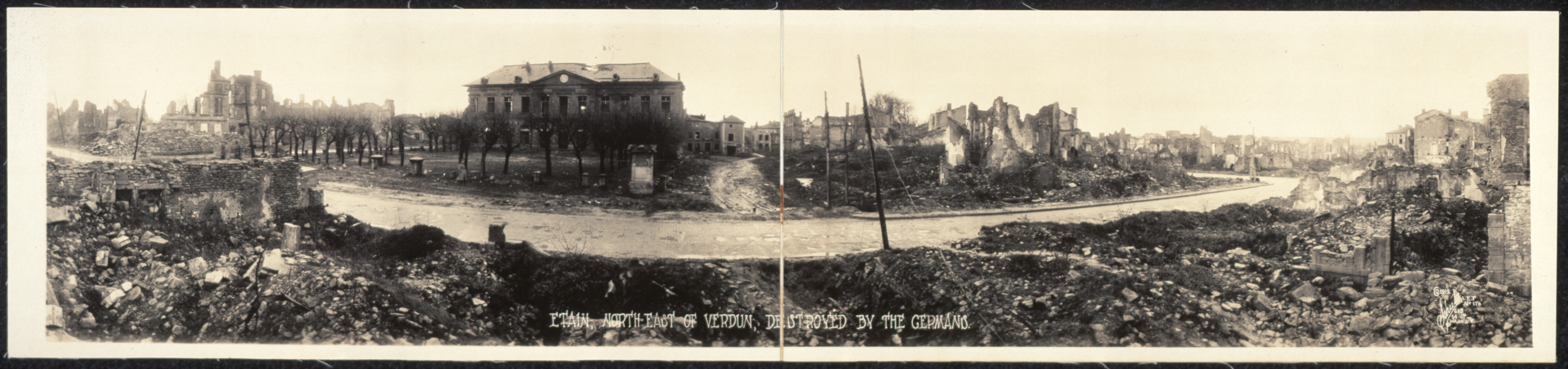
World War I damage at Étain

The town, which dates from the late 7th/early 8th century, does not have any natural defense features so has fallen to the Prussians and Russians in 1815 right after the Battle of Waterloo, and to the Germans in 1870, 1914 and again in 1940.

== Population ==
Historical population
Year	Pop.	±% p.a.
1968	2,810	—
1975	3,773	+4.30%
1982	3,807	+0.13%
1990	3,577	−0.78%
1999	3,709	+0.40%
2007	3,746	+0.12%
2012	3,768	+0.12%
2017	3,580	−1.02%
2023	3,375	−0.98%
Source: INSEE

== See also ==
- Communes of the Meuse department
- Étain-Rouvres Air Base
- Petitcollin
- Route nationale 18
- Sidi Brahim Barracks
