= Quartier La Horie =

Quartier La Horie Phalsbourg-Bourscheid Air Base
- Part of Armée de Terre; United States Air Forces in Europe (USAFE)
- Located near: Phalsbourg, Moselle, France
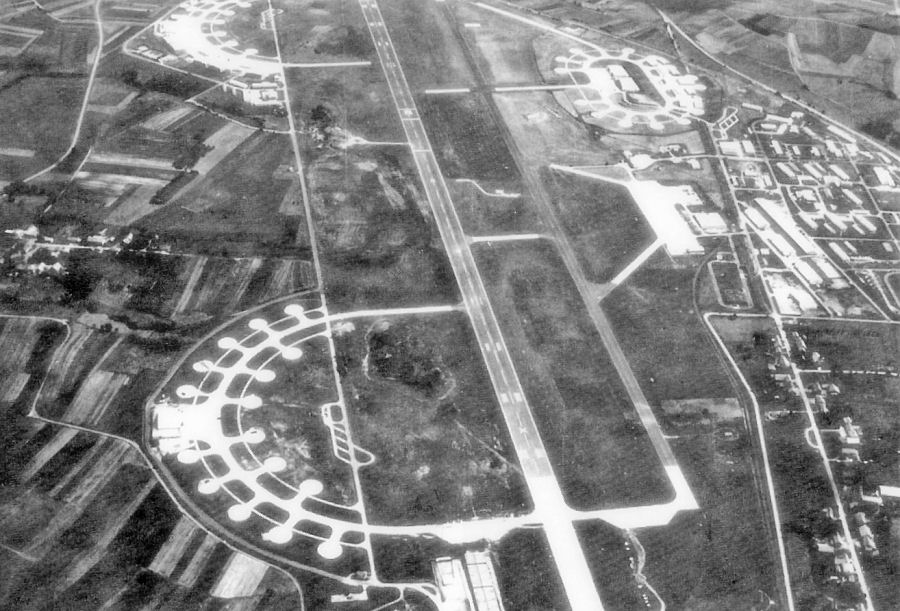
- Phalsbourg Air Base - 1956

Site information
- Controlled by: Armée de Terre

Location
- Location of Quartier La Horie, France
- Coordinates: 48°45′57″N 007°12′10″E

Site history
- Built: 1952
- In use: 1955-Present

Garrison information
- Garrison: 1er Régiment d'Hélicoptères de Combat (1e RHC)

Airfield information
- IATA: none; ICAO: none

Summary
- Elevation AMSL: 1,016 ft (310 m)
- Interactive map of Airfield information

Runways
Direction	Length		Surface
Direction	ft	m	Surface
6/24	9,900	4,677	Concrete

Quartier La Horie is a French Army base. It is located in the Moselle département, about 2 miles(3 km) west of the town of Phalsbourg, on the north side of the Route nationale 4 (N4) Highway adjacent to the village Saint-Jean-Kourtzerode; 29 miles (47 km) northwest of Strasbourg.

During the Cold War, Phalsbourg-Bourscheid Air Base was a front-line base for the United States Air Forces in Europe (USAFE).

== Origins ==
Prior to 1950, there were no existing airfields in the Phalsbourg area. With the advent of the Cold War in the late 1940s and the formation of NATO, agreements were made to expand the United States military presence in western Europe. The United States would also provide some of the tactical air power. This led to the expansion of the United States Air Forces in Europe. The United States would eventually base combat aircraft and personnel in Belgium, England, France, Iceland, Italy, Netherlands, Portugal, Spain, Turkey and West Germany.

In 1950, U.S. representatives began a series of discussions with the French to select air bases and negotiate the details of establishing a large USAF presence. USAFE desired an air field in Alsace or Lorraine due to their eastern location near the Rhine River, but at the time, there were no existing airfields that could meet NATO requirements. The agreed airfield site was west of the city of Phalsbourg, adjacent to French National Route N4 on gently rolling farmland.

== USAF use ==
The USAF wanted to base a fighter wing at Phalsbourg by 1955. In February 1952 the 7040th Air Base Squadron was activated to administer the base and provide coordination for the various construction activities. Highway N4 was moved a half-mile to the south, and by the summer of 1952, work began on the site preparation of the base.

Construction continued during 1953, and in 1954, the base was nearing completion. By the spring of 1955 the runways, taxiways and hangars were constructed, however the base was barely habitable because few roads were paved and the utilities were not yet installed. On 4 February 1955 Twelfth Air Force took possession of Phalsbourg AB, although no combat wing or aircraft had been assigned. Tactical Air Command advised USAFE that due to budget limitations, it would be unable to establish a tactical air fighter/bomber wing at the base until 1961.

The design of the airfield was to space parked aircraft as far apart as possible by the construction of a circular Marguerite system of hardstands that could be revetted later with earth for added protection. Typically the Marguerite consisted of fifteen to eighteen hardstands around a large central hangar. Each hardstand held one or two aircraft, and allowed the planes to be spaced approximately 150 feet (50 m) apart. Each squadron was assigned to a separate hangar/hardstand complex. This construction can be seen clearly in the satellite image link at the bottom of this article.

The 7040th ABS continued as the caretaker unit of the base until being replaced by the 7486th Air Base Group in 1955. Phalsbourg was kept in a reserve standby status after the construction was completed.

=== 23rd Helicopter Squadron ===
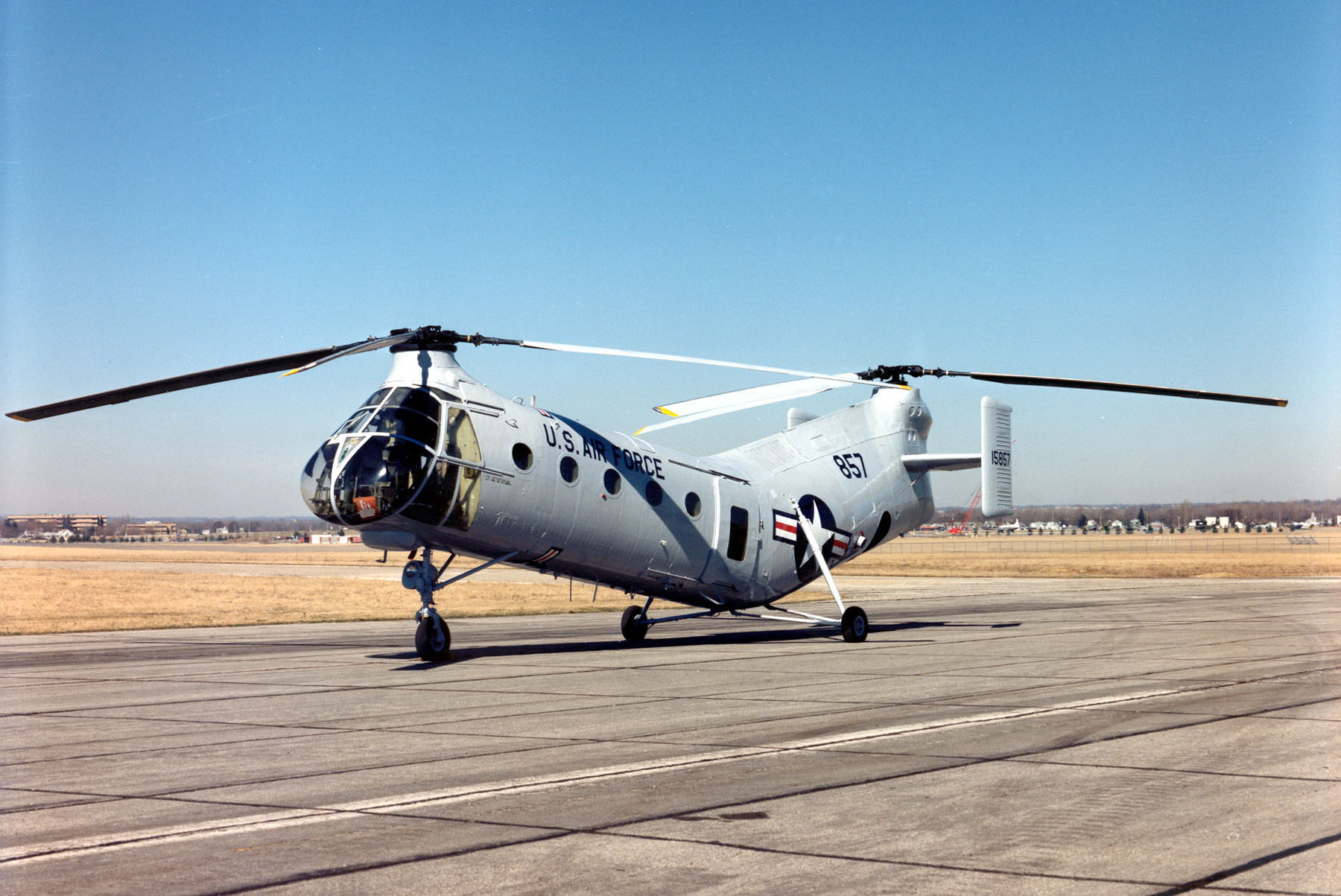
CH-21 Shawnee

The first USAF unit to be stationed at Phalsbourg AB was the 23rd Helicopter Squadron. The 23d activated on 9 July 1956 at Sewart Air Force Base, Tennessee, then deployed to Phalsbourg in November.

At Phalsbourg, the 23rd flew the Piasecki H-21B. These helicopters provided typical helicopter airlift missions such as special air lift, administrative support, and emergency air evacuation. The helicopters arrived at Phalsbourg during November, being shipped by ocean freight from Brookley AFB, Alabama via Bremerhaven West Germany, then flown to Phalsbourg by 23rd squadron pilots.

The 23rd consisted of 4 detachments:

- Det 1 and 4 were based at Phalsbourg with 10 H-21s
- Det 2 was based at RAF Wethersfield, United Kingdom with 4 H-21's
- Det 3 was based at Wheelus Air Base, Libya with 4 H-21's.

The 23rd was the only helicopter squadron in USAFE and had difficulties operating, because it was not allowed to fly at night in France and had insufficient manning to provide complete base/wing operations. The helicopters at Wethersfield were equipped for air-sea rescue flights, while the ones at Wheelus supported the 7272nd Flying Training Wing to support gunnery range operations and flight test operations of the Matador cruise missile program.

USAFE felt that with the Army developing similar capabilities in France and the limitations of the helicopter airlift missions at Phalsbourg, retaining the 23rd was not worth the costs, and the unit was inactivated on 8 January 1958. The 10 helicopters at Phalsbourg and 2 from RAF Wethersfield were returned to CONUS, being assigned to Brookley AFB, the others being retained at Wheelus for range operations.

=== 10th and 66th Tactical Reconnaissance Wings ===
In January 1958, the 10th Tactical Reconnaissance Wing at Spangdahlem AB Germany deployed the 32nd and 38th TRSquadrons, flying the RF-84F to Phalsbourg while the runway at Spangdahlem was under repair and renovation. During May, the 10th TRW began receiving new RF-101A "Voodoos" from CONUS and the RF-84's squadrons were transferred to the 66th Tactical Reconnaissance Wing which was then based at Sembach AB also in Germany.

Because the runway conditions at Sembach were not suitable for F-84 operations, the two squadrons of the 66th, the 32nd and 38th were moved to Phalsbourg during the spring and summer of 1958.

The stay of the 66th TRW would be brief, as the wing was being transferred to Laon AB, but they remained TDY at Phalsbourg until the end of September 1958 until Laon's runway was ready for them.

=== 513th Fighter Interceptor Squadron ===
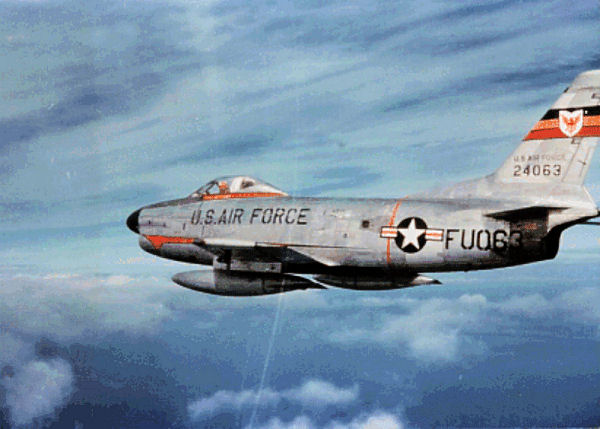
North American F-86D-45-NA Sabre Serial 52-4063 of the 513th Fighter Interceptor Squadron

The 513th Fighter Interceptor Squadron arrived at Phalsbourg on 16 April 1958 from RAF Manston, England. The 513th FIS flew the F-86D "Sabre", performing an all-weather air defense mission as part of the 406th Fighter-Bomber Wing.

Twenty-six F-86D's were assigned to the squadron at Phalsbourg. They were marked with a red and black sunburst on their vertical stabilizer/rudder with an eagle emblem. The Squadron commander during that era was Col. Robert Rankin a member of the famed World War II 56th Fighter Group and the first ace in a day in the European theater.

On 1 May the 406th was inactivated and the 513th FIS was assigned to the 86th Fighter-Interceptor Wing at Ramstein AB, Germany. However, the squadron was assigned to Phalsbourg where it stood air defense alert.

The F-86's provided the air defense of western Europe for the next five years. In January 1959, the Convair F-102 "Delta Dagger" began to replace the F-86 in the air defense role, and on 18 November 1960, the aircraft of the 513th FIS began to stand down.

The 513th was assigned to the 86th Air Division as it prepared for its inactivation. The F-86's began to leave during November and December 1960 and the 513th FIS was inactivated on 8 January 1961.

With the departure of the F-86's Phalsbourg AB was again placed in a reserve status with the 7486th Air Base Group serving as the caretaker unit.

=== 1961 Berlin Crisis ===
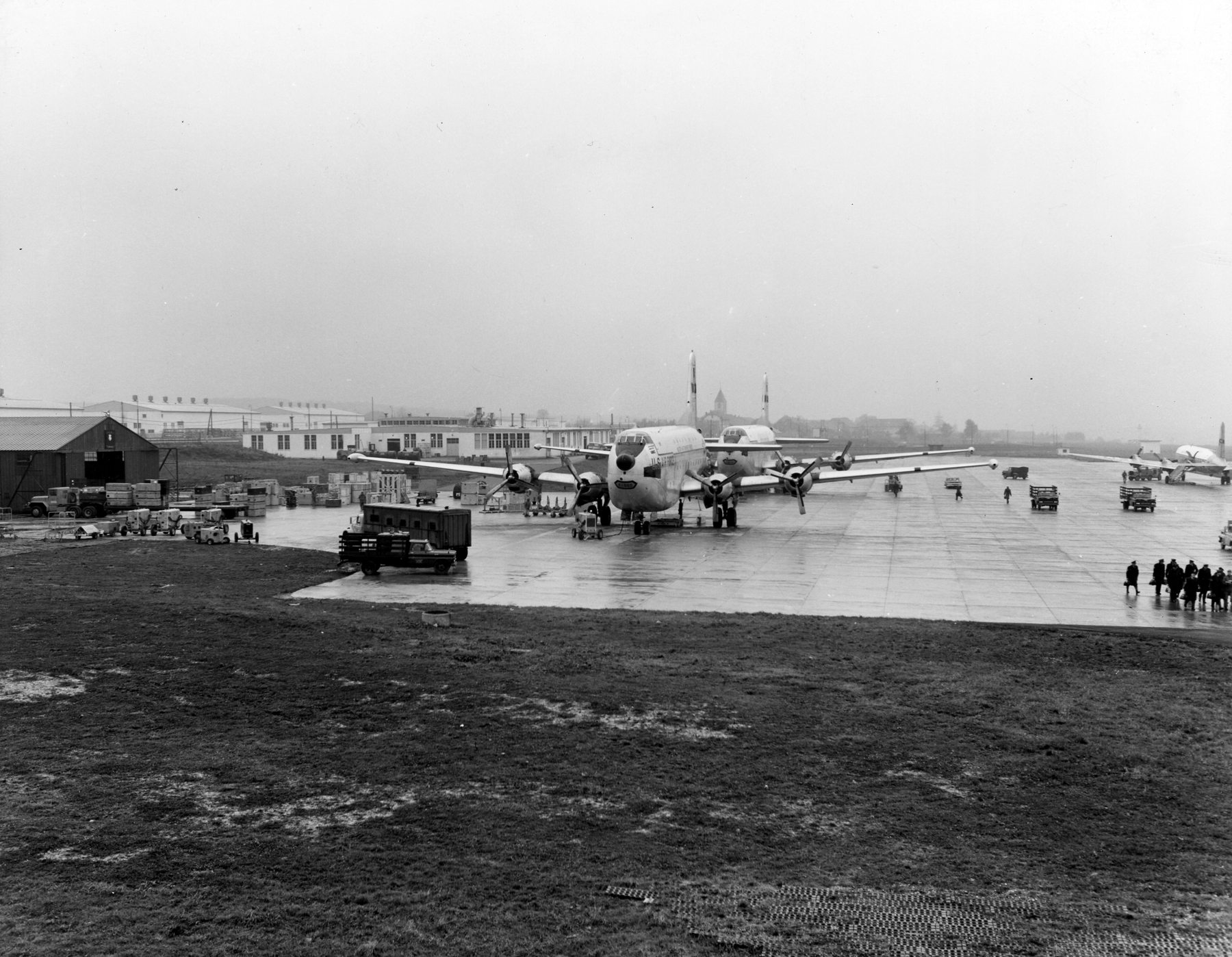
C-124Cs at Phalsbourg during 1961 Berlin Crisis.

After almost two years without any permanent flying units, on 5 September 1961 Phalsbourg Air Base was reactivated as part of Operation Tack Hammer, the United States response to the Berlin Crisis.

==== 102nd Tactical Fighter Wing ====
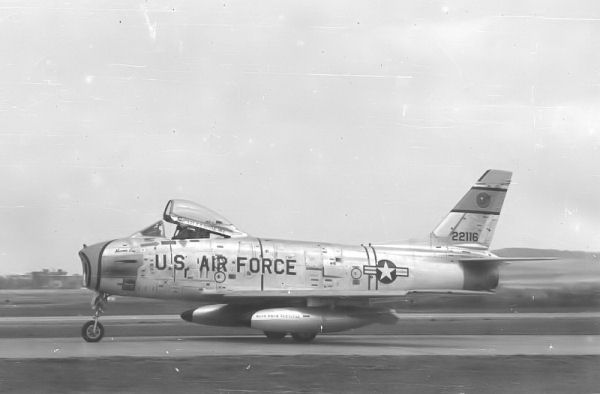
North American YF-86H-5-NA Sabre Serial 52-2116 of the 138th Tactical Fighter Squadron/102d Tactical Fighter Wing deployed at Phalsbourg - 1962. Originally manufactured as a pre-production F-86H, this aircraft was modified to production specifications before seeing operational service.

During the summer of 1961, as the Berlin Crisis unfolded, several USAF reserve units were notified on 16 August of their pending activation and recall to active duty. On 1 October the Massachusetts Air National Guard 102nd Tactical Fighter Wing and its three fighter squadrons, the 101st, 131st, and 138th went on active duty at Otis AFB.

Between 28 and 30 October, the 102nd TFW departed Logan International Airport to Phalsbourg. The wing deployed 82 F-86H "Sabre"s. The 101st were marked with green stripes on their vertical stabilizers, the 131st with red stripes, and the 138th with yellow stripes. In addition 2 C-47 and 6 T-33 aircraft were assigned to the wing for support and training purposes.

The 102nd's primary mission was to provide close air support to NATO ground forces and air interdiction. This involved keeping its aircraft on 24/7 alert. Starting on 5 December, the 102nd began deploying to Wheelus AB Libya for gunnery training.

During its time in Europe, the 102nd participated in several USAF and NATO exercises, including a deployment to Leck Air Base, West Germany near the Danish border. At Leck, ground and support crews from both countries exchanged duties, learning how to perform aircraft maintenance and operational support tasks.

On 7 May 1962, Seventeenth Air Force directed that the 102nd TFW would deploy back to CONUS during the summer, and the 102nd TFW returned to the United States in July 1962, Regular USAF personnel, along with a group of ANG personnel who volunteered to remain on active duty formed the 480th Tactical Fighter Squadron of the newly activated 366th Tactical Fighter Wing.

During July and August the 102nd returned to Massachusetts, with the last of the ANG aircraft departing on 20 July. With their departure, Phalsbourg AB was again placed under the control of the 7486th Air Base Group serving as the host unit.

After the departure of the 102nd TFW, a major refurbishing of the runway at Phalsbourg commenced, with the base closed to tactical aircraft operations until December.

=== 480th Tactical Fighter Squadron ===
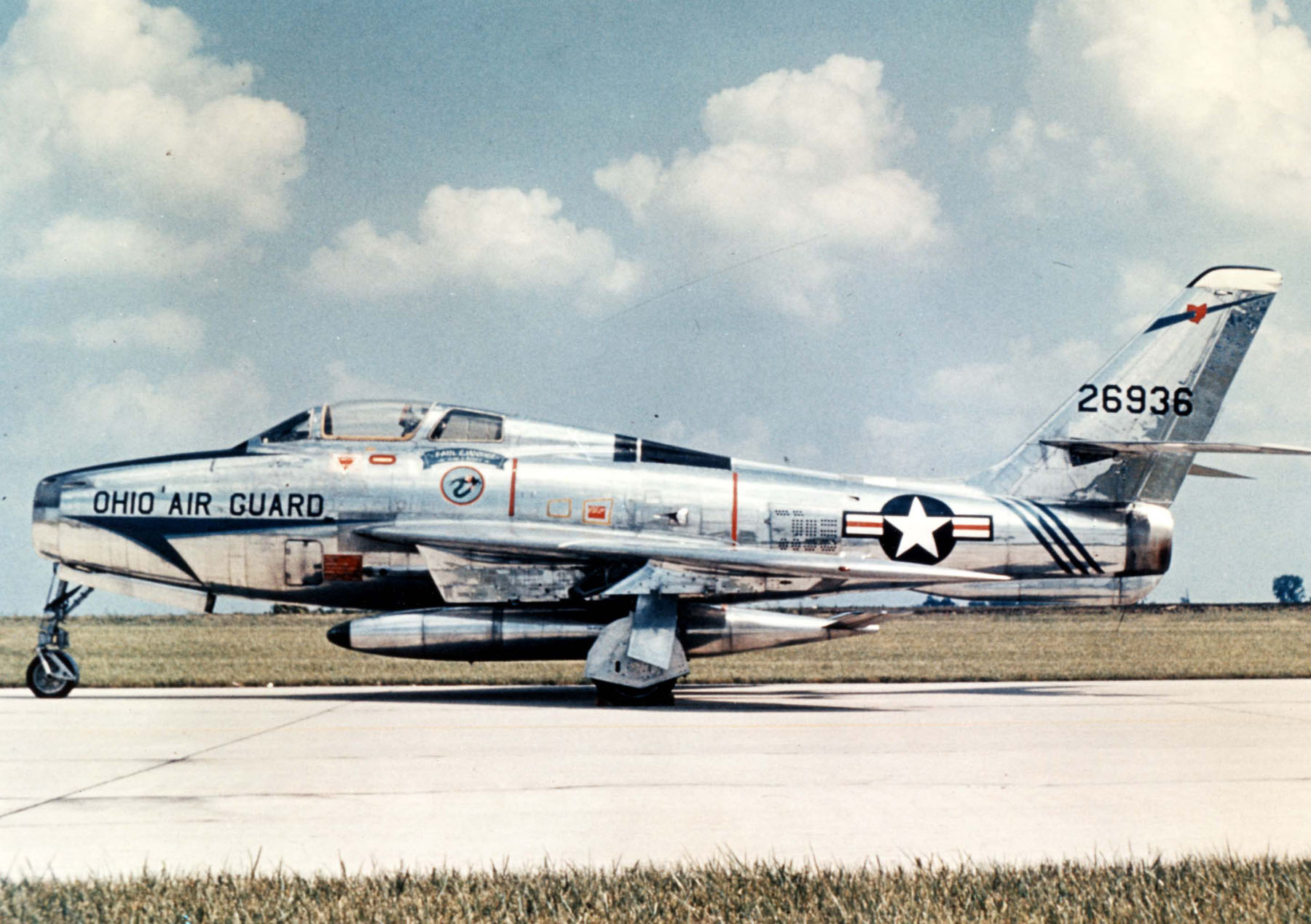
Republic F-84F-40-RE Thunderstreak 52-6526 of the 480th TFS. This aircraft is now on permanent display at the Museum of the United States Air Force, Wright-Patterson AFB, Ohio

The 366th Tactical Fighter Wing was a USAFE experiment. Wing Headquarters for the 366th was activated at Chaumont-Semoutiers Air Base on 8 May 1962, with 4 operational aircraft squadrons being equipped with the aircraft left behind by the deployed Air National Guard wings deployed to France as a result of the Berlin Crisis.

The 480th Tactical Fighter Squadron arrived in December and reported to the 66th's TFW Wing Headquarters at Chaumont AB. The squadron was equipped with 20 F-84Fs, tail coded with a green band on their vertical stabilizers. Other squadrons of the 366th TFW were located at Etain, Chambley and Chaumont Air Bases.

The mission of the 480th was to provide close air support to the Seventh U.S. Army as well as air defense. Like the 102nd preceding it, this required the squadron to be on 24/7 alert. During September 1962 the 480th began sending its pilots to Wheelus for training.

During the Cuban Missile Crisis in October 1962 the squadron assumed a total alert posture with fully bomb loaded aircraft on the alert pads. Bomb loads were frequently changed as targets were relocated during the initial days of the crisis.

On 16 July 1963 the 480th TFS departed Phalsbourg and rejoined the rest of the 366th TFW at its new home at Holloman AFB New Mexico. With their departure, Phalsbourg AB was then placed in a reserve status by USAFE, and the 7369th Combat Support Group maintained Phalsbourg in a standby reserve status.

Until 1966, the base saw occasional use by NATO for alerts and deployments of personnel and cargo into Germany for Reforger exercises. In October 1963 Phalsbourg was used by the 401st Tactical Fighter Wing deployed TDY from England Air Force Base Louisiana for about 40 days, flying F-100 "Super Sabre" aircraft from the base.

The F-100's were the last tactical aircraft to operate from Phalsbourg Air Base.

=== USAF closure ===
On 7 March 1966, French President Charles De Gaulle announced that France would withdraw from NATO's integrated military structure. The United States was informed that it must remove its military forces from France by 1 April 1967.

Since no active Wing was present, it was an uncomplicated process to deactivate Phalsbourg. On 15 February 1967 the American flag was lowered and the base returned to the French.

== Current uses ==
After the USAF departure, Phalsbourg AB was used by the French Army as a helicopter base and a logistics depot. The base was renamed quartier La Horie.

Currently, the 1er régiment d'hélicoptères de combat (1er RHC) Combat Helicopter Regiment operates from the base and flies Eurocopter Tiger, SA342 "Gazelles", and NH90 Caiman.

The base is well-maintained and has been expanded over the years, and remains a front-line French military facility.

Former French units:

15e base de soutien du matériel (15e BSMAT) Materials Base (from 2005 to 2014)

6e régiment du matériel (6e RMAT) Material Regiment (from 1999 to 2005)

9e régiment de soutien aéromobile (9e RSAM) Airmobile Support Regiment (from 1987 to 1999)

4e régiment d'hélicoptères de commandement et de manœuvre (4e RHCM) Command Helicopter Regiment (from 1985 to 1999)

6e régiment d'artillerie (6e RA) Artillery Regiment (from 1986 to 1993)

68e régiment d'artillerie (68e RA) Artillery Regiment (from 1976 to 1984)

1er régiment de chasseurs (1er RCh) Armoured Regiment (from 1969 to 1976)
