= Maginot Barracks =

Coordinates: 49.1654°N 5.3590°E

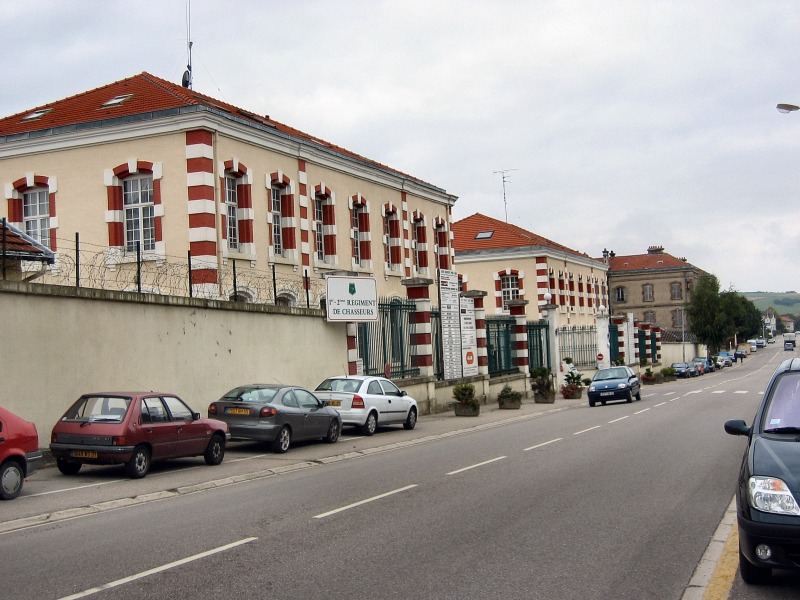
Front wall of Maginot Barracks, Old Main Gate in distance.

Maginot Barracks (/ˈmæʒɪnoʊ/; French: Caserne Maginot [kazɛʁn maʒino]) is located in Thierville-sur-Meuse, west of Verdun, France, and has served as a military base for the French and American armies at different times over the past one hundred years. It became headquarters for ADSEC, the Advance Section of COMZ (Communications Zone) of the U.S. Army, shortly after World War II until 1967 when it reverted to French control after Charles de Gaulle's withdrawal from the military integration of NATO. The barracks was named for André Maginot, the Minister of War responsible for the Maginot Line, who had served as an enlisted man at Verdun in World War I.
