= Detmar Blow =

British architect

- Born: 24 November 1867; England
- Died: 7 February 1939 (aged 71); Gloucester, England
- Occupation: Architect
- Spouse: Winifred Tollemache
- Buildings: Hilles; Eaton Hall (Cheshire)

Detmar Jellings Blow (24 November 1867 – 7 February 1939) was a British architect of the early 20th century, who designed principally in the arts and crafts style. His clients belonged chiefly to the British aristocracy, and later he became estates manager to the Duke of Westminster.

== Life and career ==
Son of Jellings Blow, of Hilles, Stroud, Gloucestershire, Blow was one of the last disciples of John Ruskin, whom as a young man he had accompanied on his last journey abroad. Detmar was friends with the Wyndham family, who at their country house Clouds in Wiltshire created a salon frequented by many of the leading intellectual and artistic figures of the day, known as The Souls, who welcomed Blow into their midst whilst admiring his romantic socialist views.

In 1910 at St Paul's Cathedral, he married Winifred Tollemache, daughter of Hamilton Tollemache. The fiction that he was a descendant of the English restoration composer John Blow was started by Winifred, a member of the aristocratic Tollemache family, as a means of obtaining a licence from St Paul's for the marriage.

Blow's architectural work was influenced by his mentors Ruskin, William Holman Hunt and Philip Webb, the architect of Clouds (1886). In his early career he adopted the role of the wandering architect, travelling artisan-like with his own band of masons from project to project. He married the aristocratic and intellectual Winifred Tollemache, and began to be patronised by the higher échelons of the British aristocracy. While much of his early work was, like that of his contemporary Lutyens, in the Arts and Crafts style, his later work was dictated by the whims of his aristocratic patrons. He became a brother of the Art Workers' Guild in 1892. At one point during his career he and Lutyens contemplated entering together into an architectural partnership. In 1906 he formed a partnership with the French architect Fernand Billerey (1878–1951) which continued until 1924, when the partnership was dissolved.

Amongst the buildings designed by Blow were Hilles, at Harescombe, near Stroud, Gloucestershire, the mansion he built for himself after 1914, very much influenced by the ideals of Ruskin, Webb and William Morris (Blow was present at Morris's death and organised his funeral procession, driving the flower-strewn hay-wagon carrying the coffin, dressed in a farm worker's smock). In 1908 he rebuilt Bramham Park for the Lane Fox family; however, this commission was a restoration of the former Baroque house which had been severely damaged by fire in 1828.

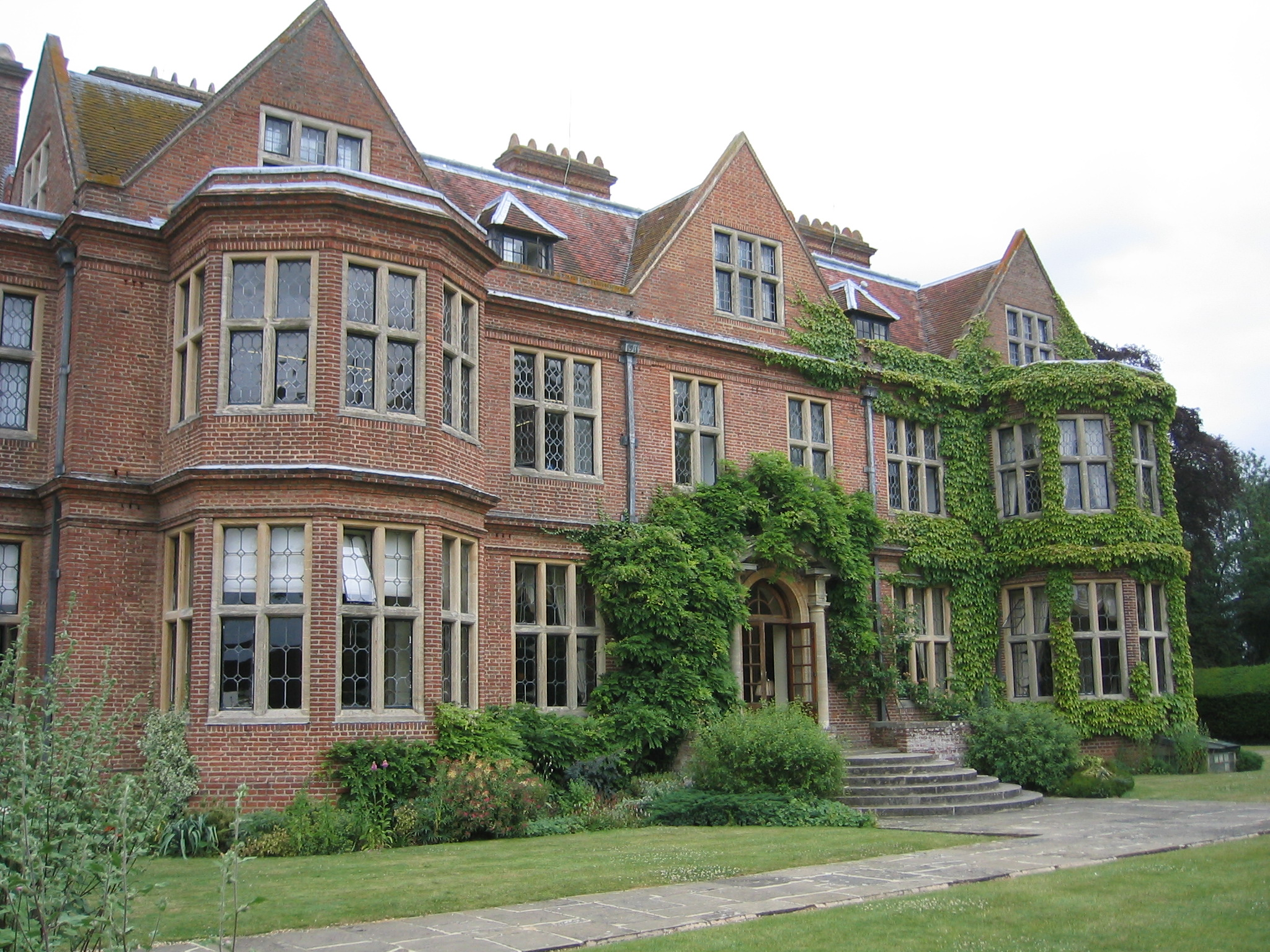
Horwood House, designed by Detmar Blow in William and Mary style in 1912

Blow designed various properties for Hugh "Bendor" Grosvenor, 2nd Duke of Westminster, including the Château Woolsack, a hunting lodge at Mimizan in France. From 1916 to 1933 Blow worked almost exclusively for the duke, as manager of the Grosvenor estates, and as private secretary. His contemporary Edwin Lutyens described Blow in 1917 working as "a sort of baillif and Maitre d'Hotel as far as I can make out!" A later disagreement, over "largely unfounded" allegations of embezzlement, led to Blow's resignation and retirement.

== Notable works ==
- Lake House, Wiltshire (1898). Restoration of an Elizabethan house near Salisbury, with oversight by the Society for the Protection of Ancient Buildings (SPAB). Lake House was gutted by fire in 1912, and Blow returned to reinstate and secure the ancient walls for a second time.
- Stoneywell and Lea Cottages, Ulverscroft, Leicestershire (1898–9), to Ernest Gimson's designs. A 2012 appeal aimed to bring Stoneywell into the care of the National Trust.
- St Peter and St Paul's Church, Clare, Suffolk (1899). Restoration of the Church tower, again under SPAB oversight and guidance from Philip Webb.
- Happisburgh Manor, Happisburgh, Norfolk (1900). Blow's first major work, although the butterfly plan design was inspired by Ernest Gimson. Built as a seaside villa, it is now a holiday rental property.
- Stonehenge, Wiltshire (1900). When a trilithon fell over on 30 Dec 1900, Blow was engaged by SPAB both to re-erect and repair the lintel, and consider measures to prevent further erosion from the number of visitors.
- Amesbury Abbey, Wiltshire. Dates uncertain, but appears to be contemporary with his Stonehenge involvement.
- Lavington Park, West Sussex (1903). Elizabethan house built by the Garton Family, enlarged by Blow for Lord Woolavington. Now Seaford College.
- Little Ridge, Fonthill, Wiltshire (1904–6). Built for Hugh Morrison, it was constructed from the stones of Berwick St Leonard manor house, three miles away. Massively enlarged in 1912 and renamed Fonthill House, it was demolished in 1979.
- Church of St Mary and St Melor, Amesbury (1905). Structural restoration, working with architect C. E. Ponting.
- Wilsford Manor, Wilsford cum Lake, Wiltshire (1906) for Edward and Pamela Tennant, 1st Baron Glenconner, with internal woodwork by Ernest Gimson.
- All Saints' Chapel, Avon Tyrell House, Sopley, Hampshire (1906) for Lord Manners, with murals by Phoebe Traquair.
- Bramham Park, Yorkshire (1908). Restoration for the Lane-Fox family.
- Breccles Hall, Norfolk (1907–9). Rebuilt from a substantially ruined Elizabethan manor, with considerable care over the conservation and archaeological evidence.
- Billesley Manor, Warwickshire (1906–13). Now a hotel.
- Hatch House, Newtown, Wiltshire (1908).
- Islay House (1910) Nursery wing.
- Heale House, Woodford, Wiltshire (1910). Blow added a new wing for the Hon. Louis Greville.
- 46 Grosvenor Street, London (1910–11). Reconstruction of two townhouses into a single residence for Sir Edgar Speyer.
- Horwood House, Little Horwood, Buckinghamshire (1912) with Fernand Billery.
- Château Woolsack, Mimizan, France (1912). A hunting lodge for the 2nd Duke of Westminster.
- Hilles, Harescombe, Gloucestershire (started in 1913). Built for himself and still occupied by the Blow family.
- Stanway House, Gloucestershire (1913). Blow built a new wing for Lady Mary Elcho, later Lady Wemyss, sister of Pamela Tennant, and one of the founders of The Souls.
- Schloss Kranzbach, Krün, near Garmisch-Partenkirchen, Germany (1915). Blow's plans, in Arts and Crafts style, were drawn up in 1913 for the Hon. Miss Mary Portman, who intended it to be an artist's retreat. Building work was completed in 1915, but the war meant neither Blow nor Portman saw it. Used as accommodation for the 1936 Winter Olympics, it is now a hotel.
- Gwrych Castle, Abergele, Wales (1914). He was instructed by Winifred, Countess of Dundonald to extend the castle by building a grand staircase, the walls were finished with white and green Italian marble.
- Wootton Manor, Polegate, Sussex (1915?). 17th-century manor house, with 14th-century elements, greatly enlarged by Blow for the Gwynne family.
- Holcombe House, Stroud, Gloucestershire (1925), leased by Blow to Lady Plymouth, formerly Gay Windsor, another of The Souls.
- Broome Park, Kent (1915–16). Lord Kitchener had bought it in 1911, and involved Blow in its renovation. One of the few building commissions he had during the Great War, it was unfinished when Kitchener died in 1916.

== Bibliography ==
- Drury, Michael (2000). Wandering Architects: In Pursuit of an Arts and Crafts Ideal. Stamford, Lincs: Shaun Tyas. ISBN 190028913X.
- Sheppard, F. H. W. (1980). Grosvenor Street: South Side, Survey of London: volume 40: The Grosvenor Estate in Mayfair, Part 2 (The Buildings). English Heritage.
