= Château Trompette (Vanxains) =

- Château Trompette
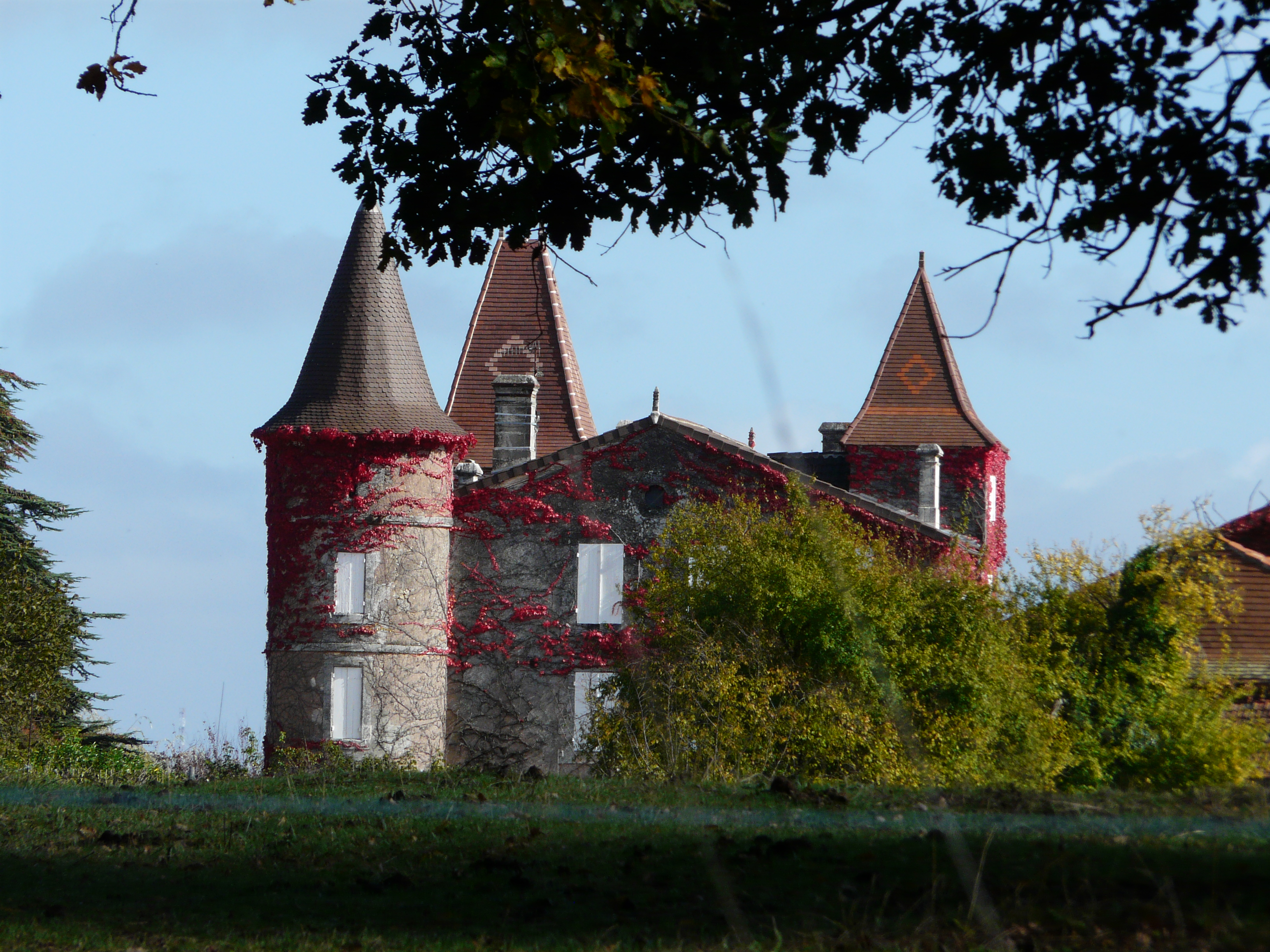
- The Château Trompette and its 3 towers

- Location within France

General information
- Type: Château
- Location: Vanxains, Dordogne, France, Mimizan, France
- Coordinates: 45°13′26″N 0°17′44″E
- Current tenants: Riom family
- Construction started: 19th century

Technical details
- Floor count: 2

The Château Trompette is a French château in the commune of Vanxains in Dordogne department in the Nouvelle-Aquitaine region of south-western France.

The current residents are the Riom family.

== Presentation ==
The Château Trompette is located in the west of the Dordogne department, one kilometre north-west of the town of Vanxains, near the intersection of roads D43 and National Road NR708. It is a private property.

It is made up of a rectangular group of buildings dominated by three towers: one round tower to the north-west and two square towers to the south and the north-east.

== History ==
The Château was built in the 19th century on the site of an old farm

== Galerie ==
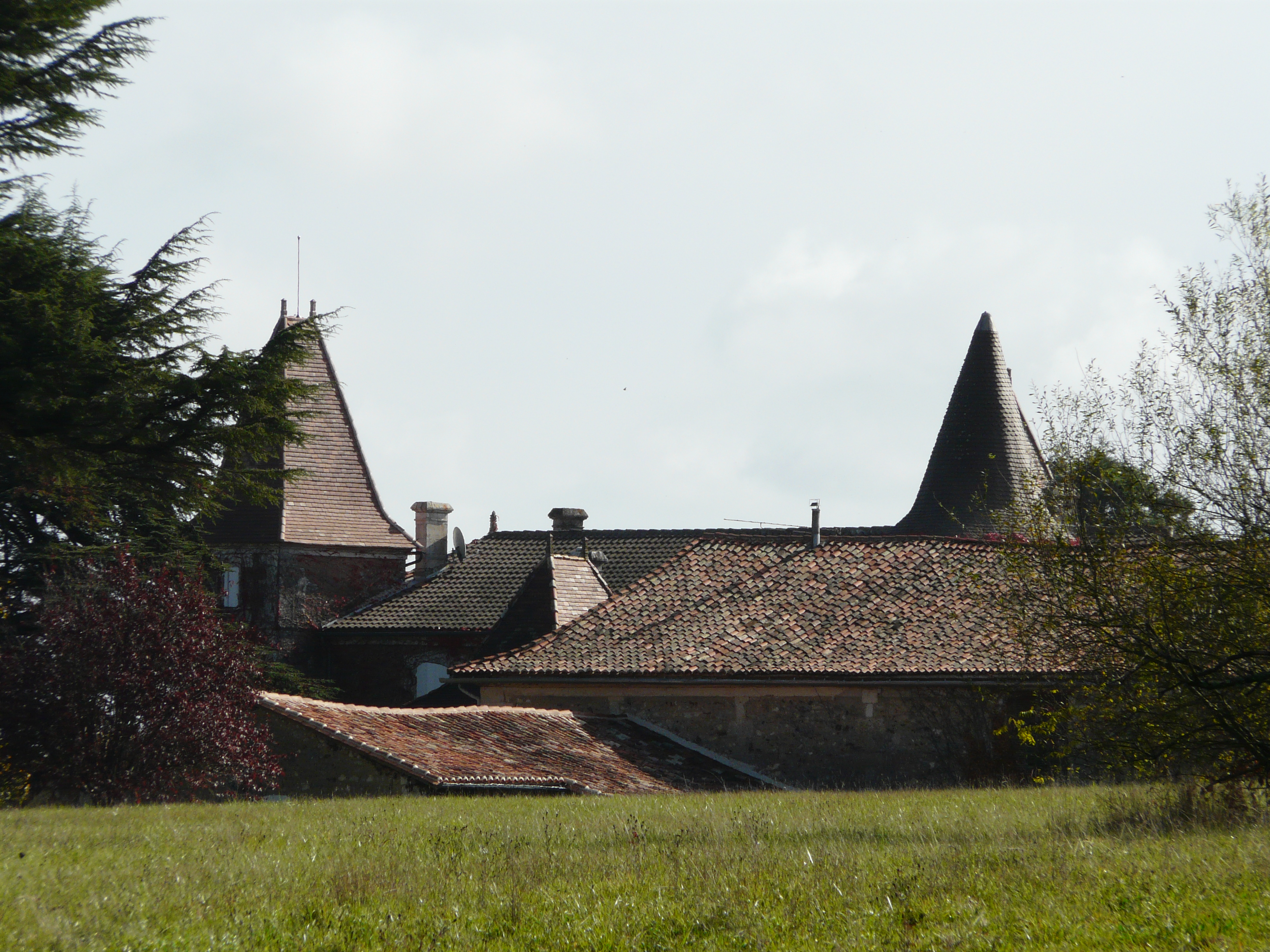
View from the North-west

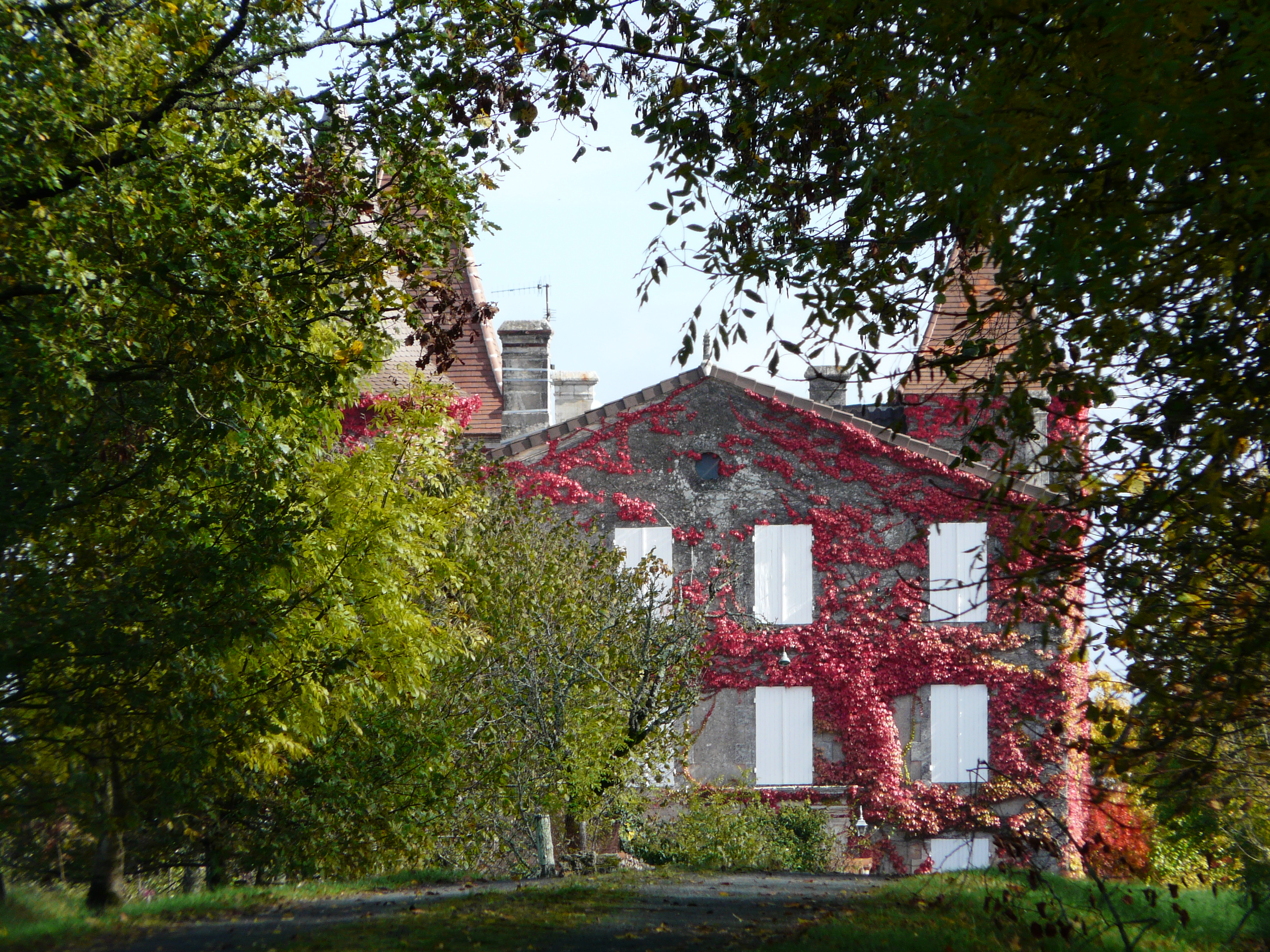
View from the west

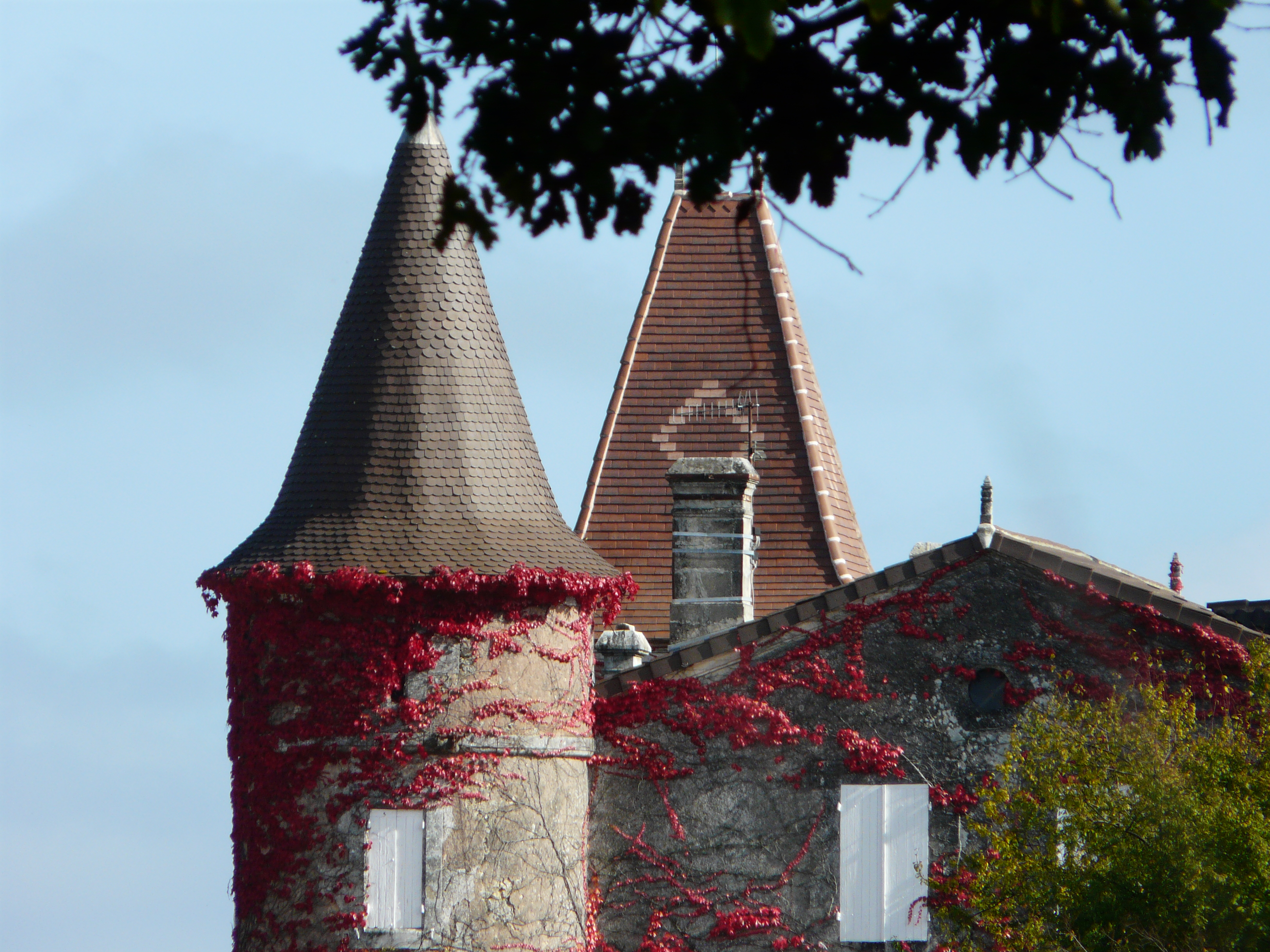
The North-west and north-east towers
