= Mimizan =

- Commune
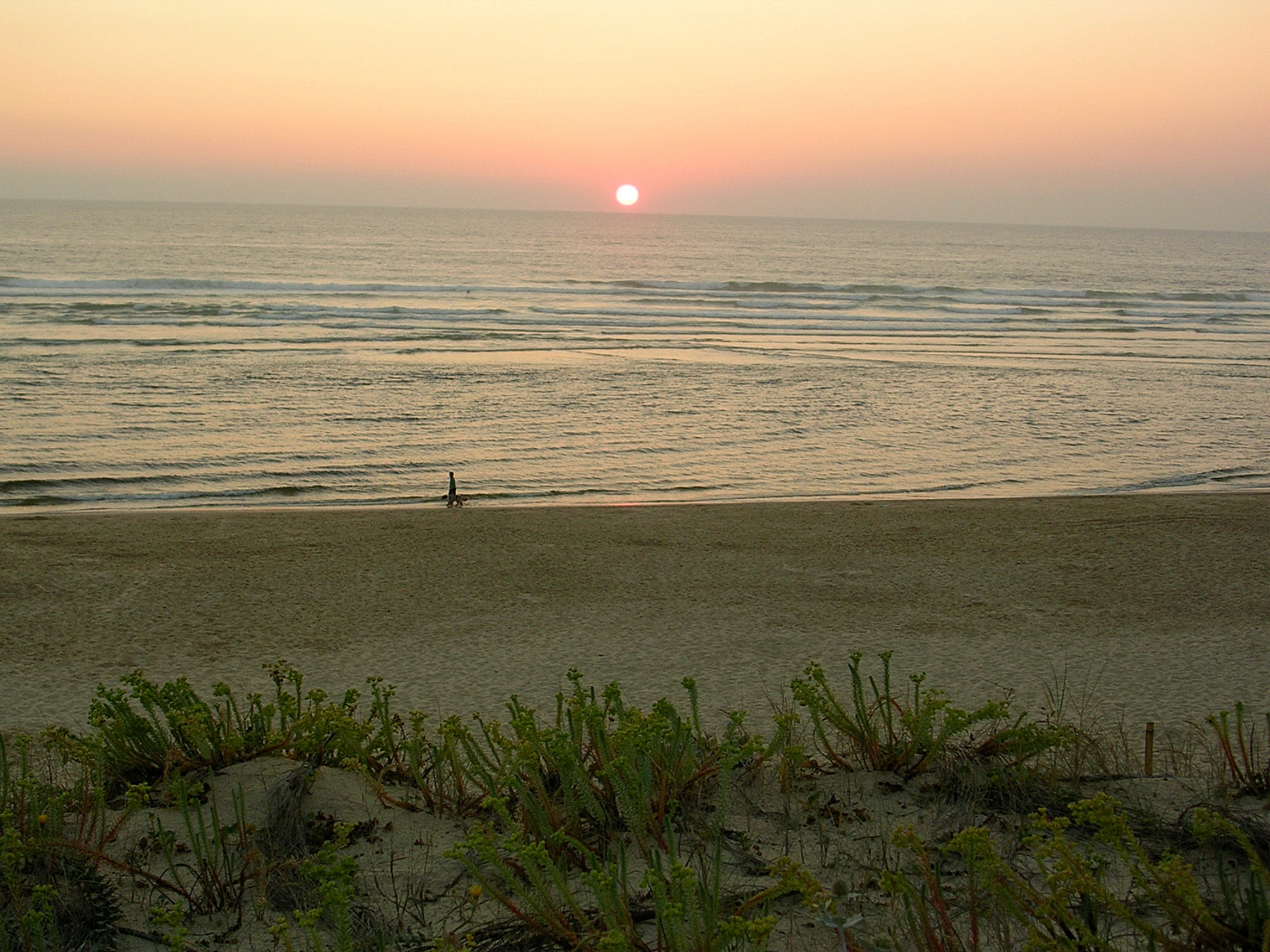
- Sunset on a Mimizan beach

- Coat of arms
- Location of Mimizan
- Location within France Location within Nouvelle-Aquitaine
- Coordinates: 44.201°N 1.228°W
- Country: France
- Region: Nouvelle-Aquitaine
- Department: Landes
- Arrondissement: Mont-de-Marsan
- Canton: Côte d'Argent
- Intercommunality: Mimizan

Government
  - Mayor (2020–2026): Frédéric Pomarez
- Area^{1}: 114.83 km^{2} (44.34 sq mi)
- Highest elevation: 80 m (260 ft)
- Lowest elevation: 0 m (0 ft)
- Population (2023): 7,673
  - Density: 66.82/km^{2} (173.1/sq mi)
- Time zone: UTC+01:00 (CET)
  - Summer (DST): UTC+02:00 (CEST)
- INSEE/Postal code: 40184 /40200
- ^{1} French Land Register data, which excludes lakes, ponds, glaciers > 1 km^{2} (0.386 sq mi or 247 acres) and river estuaries.

Mimizan (French pronunciation: [mimizɑ̃]; Occitan: Mamisan) is a commune in the Landes department in Nouvelle-Aquitaine in south-western France. There are two separate districts of the town: Mimizan-Bourg (town center) and Mimizan-Plage (resort).

== Geography ==
Mimizan is a seaside resort on the Atlantic Ocean in southwestern France.

=== The Courant de Mimizan ===
The Courant de Mimizan is a 7-kilometre (4.3 mi)-long coastal river which flows from the Étang d'Aureilhan lake through Mimizan into the sea. It also serves also a spillway for the three lakes in the north of Landes (Cazeaux-Sanguinet, Parentis-Biscarosse and Aureilhan-Mimizan). This natural boundary marks out the north and south areas of the Mimizan district.

The course of the river has altered over time. In 1812, it flowed into the ocean 3.5 kilometres (2.2 mi) further the south at Maillouyère. In 1928, a strong current of water destroyed the littoral sand dune at the river mouth, and the course is now controlled by two artificial dikes. The Courant de Mimizan is a popular spot for elver fishing.

=== Mimizan Plage ===
The coastal beach resort of Mimizan Plage is divided by the river, with the majority of summer attractions centred around the North Beach, along with the seasonal markets and a pedestrian zone. Along Mimizan South Beach are located cycle paths and walking trails. When the poet Maurice Martin made a stop at Mimizan with his caravan in 1905, he described the expanse of fine sand as the "Pearl of the Silver Coast".

== History ==
=== Origins ===
In Neolithic times, the countries of the oceanic fringe were populated by people who hunted and fished, leaving archaeological evidence behind. At the end of the Neolithic Age, small groups of farmers began to settle. During the first Iron Age (7th to 5th c. BC), small tribes who can be considered as proto-Celts, settled in the area. The presence of a civilization called the Boïens installed in the Buch countryside and who moved down to Born country have also been recorded. However, these small tribes were not deeply implanted in the Lande. When the Romans invaded the Aquitaine, they discovered tribes quite distinct from these Celtic tribes, more like the Iberians, organized in ethnic groups known under the name of the Novempopulania.

At the end of the third century the region under Rome's rule organized itself into one province: Aquitania Tertia. It would be lined with roads listed in the Antonine Itinerary, which in the early fourth century retraced the Roman routes, symbols of an economic opening, e.g., the "coastal" path and the railway station of Segosa (Saint-Paul-le-Vieux). In Born and Marensin, the bays which had not yet been closed off by dunes obviously served as ports that permitted trade and commerce, such as that of resin collected in the ancient dune forests.

The period of barbarian invasion was subject to controversy because several legends took birth there (like at Mimizan that at the battle where St. Galatoire perished under the assault of invaders). However, it was unquestionably after the Roman era the invasion of sand forming modern dunes saw the closure of bays and then the ruin of little ports. Among the people that we meet between the 5th and 10th centuries are the Gascons. In 602 the name Vasconia appeared for the first time, to describe the countryside situated between Garonne and the Pyrenees. The Carolingian influence transformed Vasconia into Gascogne. Next the country was to face the Norman invasions.

=== The Medieval Era ===
The Aquitaine duchy sprawling out from the Loire to the Pyrenees was constructed in the 11th century. It was also from this time on, and for seven centuries, that the pilgrimage to saint Jacques de Compostelle began. Pilgrims came from all over Europe crossing the Landes. They followed itineraries that outlined resting stops, places of worship, castles or mottes surrounded by stakes. They used three routes including that of the coast. A number of commanderies or hospitals erected by the Templars or the Knights of St. John of Jerusalem (e.g., Contis, Saint-Paul-en-Born, Parentis, etc.) were regrouped on this coast road. Mimizan was created as a Sauveté (a sacred refuge created by the church for the protection of the weak). Its limits were set by nine monumental posts (safety posts) in the form of pyramids. Today, only five still exist and are classified as historical monuments. If the first mention of salvitas (sauvetat) did not appear until 1270, the term frangitas was employed during 1009–1032. In 1154, the Aquitaine Duchy entered into the Kingdom of England by the marriage of Alinéor (Eleanor) of Aquitaine with Henri II Plantagenêt, and remained so up to 1453. Born was part of the diocese of Bordeaux. The large Albret family played on the rivalry between the King of France and the King-Duke. They came from the heart of the Landais countryside and carried the modest title of senhor of Labrit up to 1312, then through purchases, marriages, and inheritances went on to settle in Marensin and Born and then Bazadais. In writings the name of another family who would go on to mark history also appears: Foix-Béarn.

=== La Belle Epoque ===
After 1890, the construction of railway tracks opened up the country. The forges closed down one by one but sawmills and distilleries of resin products multiplied. The renewal of Landes, desired by the Emperor Napoleon III, the arrival of the trains of the Mediterranean Railway Companies (from 1907 up to 1960), the trend of bathing in the sea inspired by the Empress Eugenie and the benefits of the sea air on the health of those with tuberculosis all aided in the rapid expansion of the seaside resort of Mimizan-Plage (first called Mimizan-les-Bains). The town is graced with a sea-bathing establishment constructed out of wood. This drew a number of tourists and contributed to the fame of Mimizan.

One of the events to mark this period was the passage of a caravan named by the journalist and writer Maurice Martin and driven by Maurice Vignau and Alphonse Bacon. It traveled around Landes from Arcachon to trace a route for automobiles toward Biarritz. Maurice Martin was in awe of the beauty of the countryside (sky, ocean, forest) and would during a banquet on 20 March 1905 baptize the place La Côte d’Argent (The Silver Coast).

=== Château Woolsack ===
In 1911 Hughes Richard Arthur Grosvenor, Duke of Westminster, had this sublime building erected as a royal reward in recognition of his bravery during the Boer War. Designed by architects Detmar Blow and Fernand Billerey, Château Woolsack, "A Royal Shrine at the Edge of the Lake", welcomed numerous famous people during the interwar period. For 10 years Coco Chanel came here to relax, sometimes in the company of the seamstresses of her workshop to whom she offered this dream holiday in a villa situated at Mimizan-Plage (now Pylone holiday camp): paid holiday before its time!

Charlie Chaplin, Salvador Dalí, Suzanne Lenglen all came in their time to profit from this jewel of Victorian architecture. Winston Churchill, a close friend of the Duke's, even painted some 20 paintings on the banks of Lake Aureilhan. After its purchase by the Gascogne Group, Woolsack Castle is today privately owned.

=== Oiseau Canari landing ===
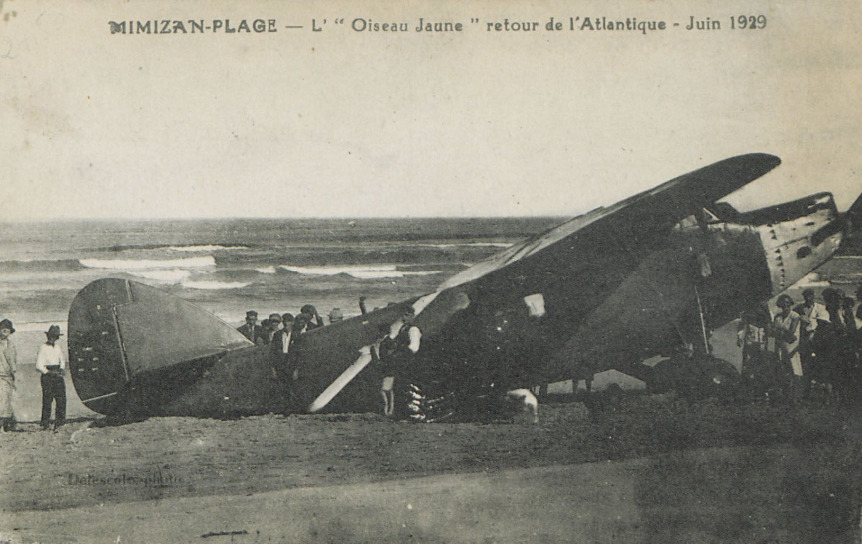
The Oiseau Canari landing at Mimizan Plage in 1929

On 16 June 1929, France's first trans-Atlantic flight made an emergency landing on the beach at Mimizan. A Bernard 190 plane named the Oiseau Canari (Canary Bird, or Yellow Bird), flew from Old Orchard in the United States to France, crewed by Jean Assolant, René Lefèvre (aviateur) and Armand Lotti. During the flight the crew discovered a stowaway, an American named Arthur Schreiber, and his extra weight caused a fuel shortage, forcing them to make an emergency landing at Mimizan. A monument at the beach (now named Plage-des-Ailes - the Wings Beach) commemorates the landing.

== Population ==
Historical population
Year	Pop.	±% p.a.
1968	6,502	—
1975	7,511	+2.08%
1982	7,409	−0.20%
1990	6,710	−1.23%
1999	6,864	+0.25%
2007	6,806	−0.11%
2012	7,030	+0.65%
2017	7,018	−0.03%
2023	7,673	+1.50%
Source: INSEE

== Floral towns and villages ==
In nearly 50 years, the "Villes et Villages Fleuris" label has become the symbol of a real social phenomenon. This phenomenon is ever increasing: each year 12,000 communities present their accomplishments at the Floral Towns and Villages competition; 3,258 communes have been awarded, 201 which won either the Quatre Fleurs (Four Flowers) or the Grand Prize.

The jury takes the following three criteria into consideration :

- The overall planting of the district (trees, shrubs and flowers)
- The living environment of the commune (awareness, respect for the environment and embellishment of buildings)
- The activities undertaken and level of participation by inhabitants in developing and maintaining a clean pleasant environment.

For over 30 years, the Community of Mimizan Communes has been actively involved in improving the quality of the environment. Mimizan commune obtained its first Fleur in 1981 and its fourth in 1995 rewarding all of daily efforts of the environmental service (16 full-time and five seasonal employees). Since 1996, the communes of Pontenx-les-Forges and of Saint-Paul-en-Born are equally committed to improving the living environment of their commune, and are achieving this through regular gardening managed by the relevant services and the participation by the population. This is how the commune of Pontenx-les-Forges obtained a Fleur, in 2002, and Saint-Paul-en-Born obtained 2 Flowers in 2003. Finally, for those who take pleasure in rich aromas and colors the appropriately named Floral Promenade reserves an unequaled show. floral paradise, bordering Aureilhan pond is really worth seeing and accessible throughout the year. "L’Île de la Promenade Fleurie" (The Isle of the Flowery Promenade) is an amazing floral haven, situated in the inlet of the lake joining land via a wooden bridge; it hosts over 300 different varieties of plants.

== Economy ==
Paper mill (Groupe Gascogne Co), tourism (seaside resort).

== Twin town ==
- Old Orchard Beach, United States.

== Places and monuments ==
The bell tower-porch of the old church is on UNESCO's World Heritage List as part of the Sites of the Routes of Santiago de Compostela in France. The hunting lodge Château de Woolsack was built in 1911 for the British Duke of Westminster (the architect was Detmar Blow).

== Notable people ==
Free French Special Air Service co-founder Georges Bergé lived and died in Mimizan where he contacted friends to form a Resistance network in March 1941.

Pioneer aviators Assolant, Lefèvre and Lotti linked Old Orchard Beach (USA) to Mimizan (landing on 16 June 1929) on board the Oiseau Canari.

Couturier Coco Chanel was a frequent holidaymaker at the Château Woolsack.

== Recreational activities ==
Popular activities include surfing, fishing, cycling and sunbathing.

== See also ==
- Communes of the Landes département
