= Mortzwiller =

Part of Le Haut-Soultzbach in Grand Est, France

- Part of Le Haut-Soultzbach
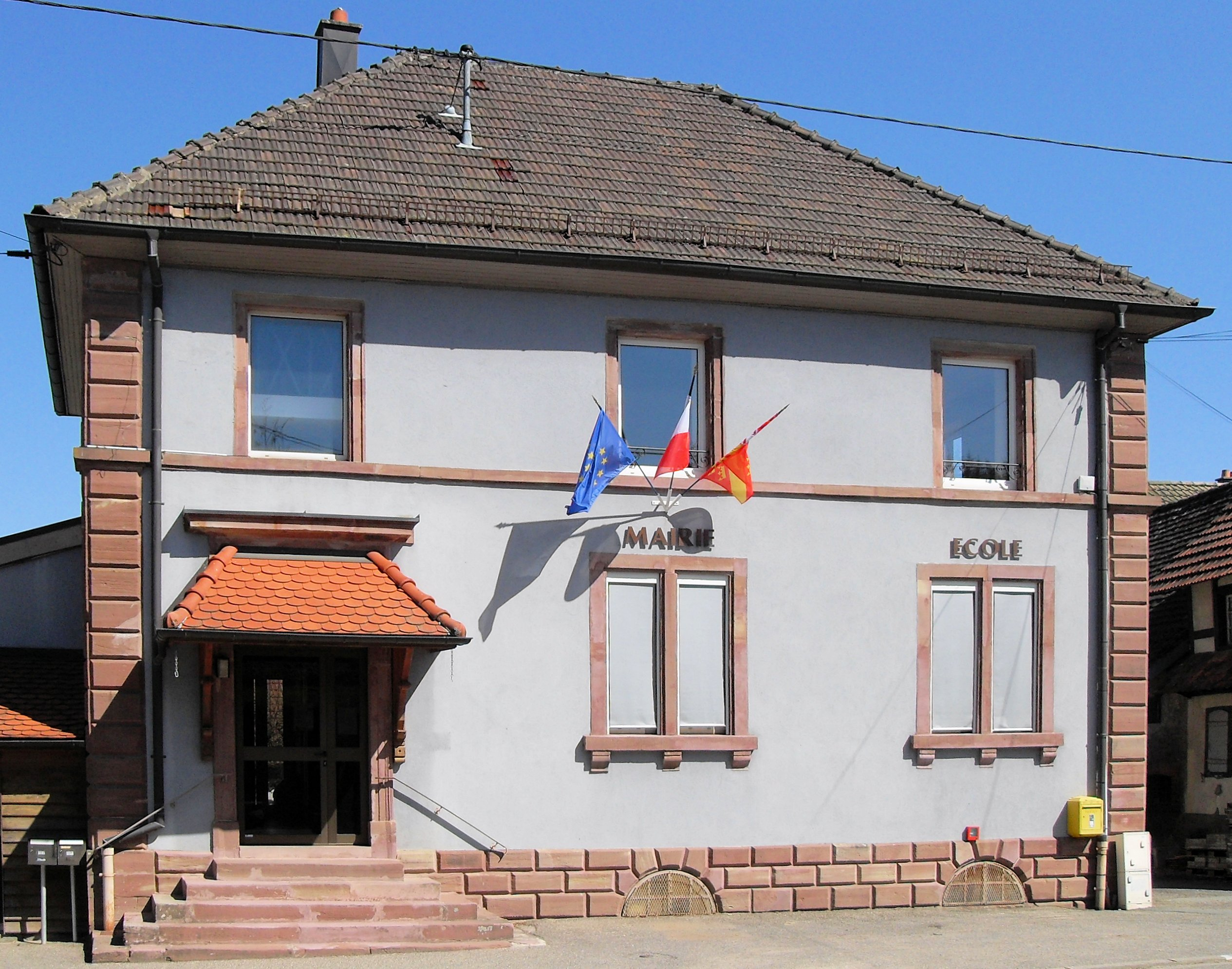
- Town hall

- Coat of arms
- Location of Mortzwiller
- Location within France Location within Grand Est
- Coordinates: 47°44′29″N 7°02′19″E
- Country: France
- Region: Grand Est
- Department: Haut-Rhin
- Arrondissement: Thann-Guebwiller
- Canton: Masevaux-Niederbruck
- Commune: Le Haut-Soultzbach
- Area^{1}: 4.23 km^{2} (1.63 sq mi)
- Elevation: 380 m (1,250 ft)
- Highest elevation: 421 m (1,381 ft)
- Lowest elevation: 340 m (1,120 ft)
- Population (2022): 339
  - Density: 80.1/km^{2} (208/sq mi)
- Time zone: UTC+01:00 (CET)
  - Summer (DST): UTC+02:00 (CEST)
- Postal code: 68780
- ^{1} French Land Register data, which excludes lakes, ponds, glaciers > 1 km^{2} (0.386 sq mi or 247 acres) and river estuaries.

Mortzwiller (German: Morzweiler, Alsatian: Morzwiller) is a former commune in the Haut-Rhin department in north-eastern France. On 1 January 2016, it was merged into the new commune Le Haut-Soultzbach.

Mortzwiller is located approximately 20 km west of Mulhouse and 20 km northeast of Belfort in the Sundgau region on the eastern side of a wooded mountain range in the Vosges, which largely coincides with the political border between the Grand Est and Bourgogne-Franche-Comté regions and also with the traditional language border.

The street village lies in the Soultzbach valley. It is surrounded to the north, west and south by the 'Forêt domaniale de Masevaux' state forest. On the southern edge of the village is the 'Étang du Vieux Moulin' (old mill pond).

== See also ==
- Communes of the Haut-Rhin département
