= Château Woolsack =

- Château Woolsack
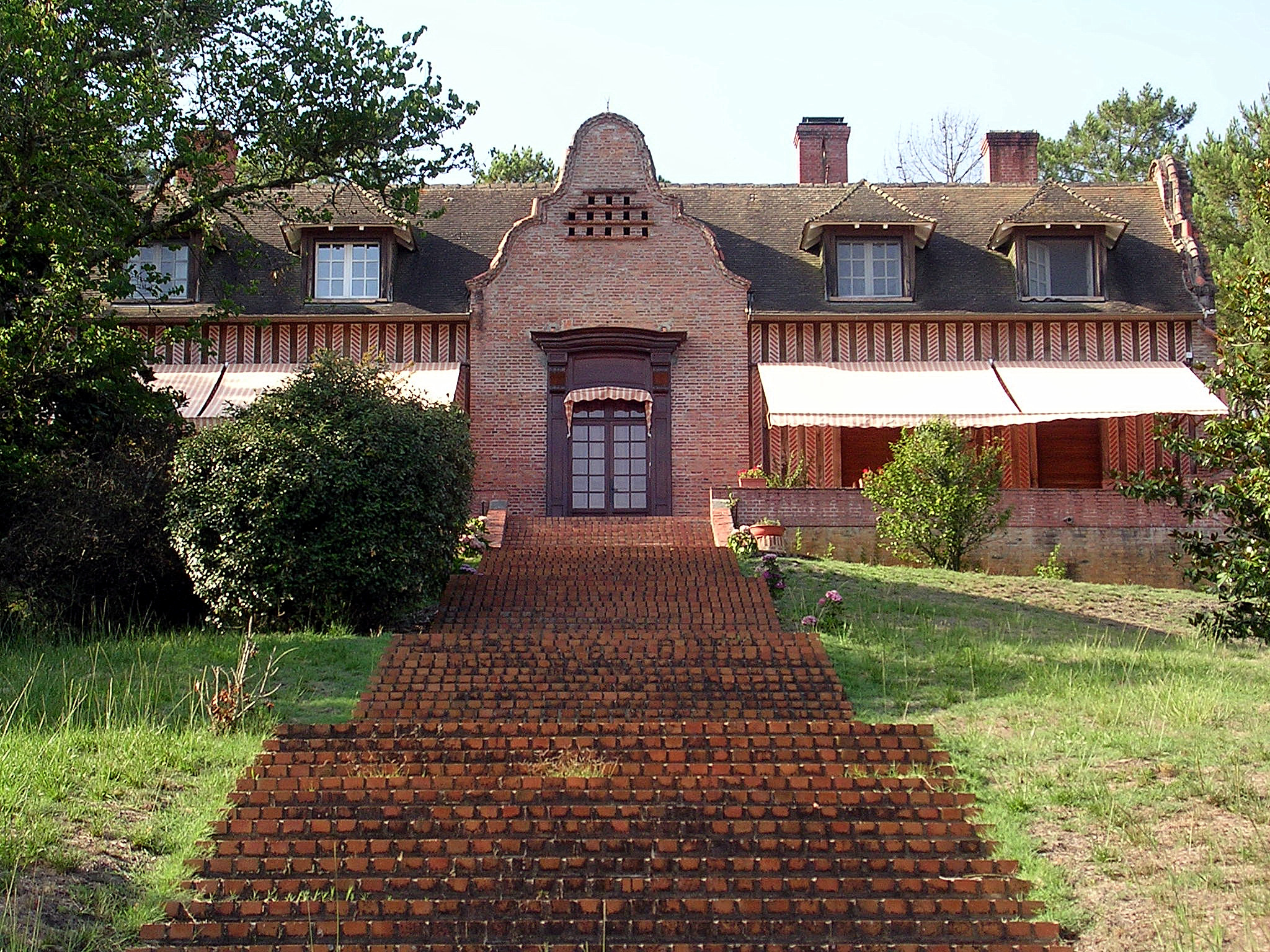
- Façade of the Château Woolsack at Mimizan

- Location within France
- Alternative names: The Woolsack

General information
- Type: Hunting Lodge
- Architectural style: Tudor
- Location: Mimizan, Landes, France, Mimizan, France
- Coordinates: 44°13′35″N 1°13′11″W
- Current tenants: Residence
- Construction started: 1911

Technical details
- Floor count: 2

Design and construction
- Architects: Detmar Blow and Fernand Billerey
- Other designers: Based on design of Sir Herbert Baker

Château Woolsack or Château de Woolsack or The Woolsack is a former hunting lodge located in the commune of Mimizan in the department of Landes in the Aquitaine region of southwestern France. Built in 1911 on the shores of Lake Aureilhan by Hugh Grosvenor, 2nd Duke of Westminster, it is a replica in the Tudor style of the home of Rudyard Kipling - the author of The Jungle Book. It is on a site which has been listed and protected since 18 July 1978.

== Presentation ==
=== Hugh Grosvenor, 2nd Duke of Westminster ===
The 2nd Duke of Westminster, born in 1879, came from one of the richest families of Great Britain.

=== Origins of the castle ===
The Duke came to Landes in 1910 on the advice of his friend Rawlinson who hunted wild boar at Mimizan with Mr. Bacon. He was captivated by the beautiful scenery.

Shortly after this first visit the Duke purchased a wooded area of over 10 hectares on the banks of Lake Aureilhan to build a hunting lodge. It was offered to him by the British Crown in recognition of the courage he showed during the Second Boer War and for services rendered.

Construction work began in 1911. The architects Detmar Blow and Fernand Billerey used plans made by Sir Herbert Baker for the property "Woolsack" in South Africa which was built by Cecil Rhodes for Rudyard Kipling, and which also inspired the name of the property in Mimizan.

== Life at the château ==
The Duke of Westminster regularly stayed in his new Tudor style of Cape Town property until 1940 and for some time beyond for official obligations. In the absence at the time of any land access, the Duke used a boat to access his property, where he organized hunts and receptions. His coming was an important event for the region: many inhabitants of the town were in his service.

An English quarter was built next to the castle: a dozen bungalows, all in white and black lacquered wood. They accommodated the grooms alongside the stables. This area was also occupied by the staff who organised hunting parties, the steward, the head housekeeper, the dog handlers, the mule-drivers, the chauffeur, and the Duke's friends. There were thirty horses occupying the stables and no less than sixty dogs in the kennels.

In her memoirs, Loelia Ponsonby, the third wife of the Duke, wrote about Woolsack: "There I cut down trees to reveal the view of the lake, I arranged the steps to go down to the water."

=== Notable guests ===
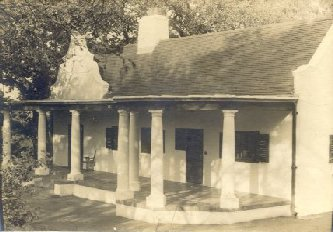
The Woolsack, Cape Town, summer residence of the Kipling family from 1900 to 1908, which served as a model for the Château Woolsack at Mimizan

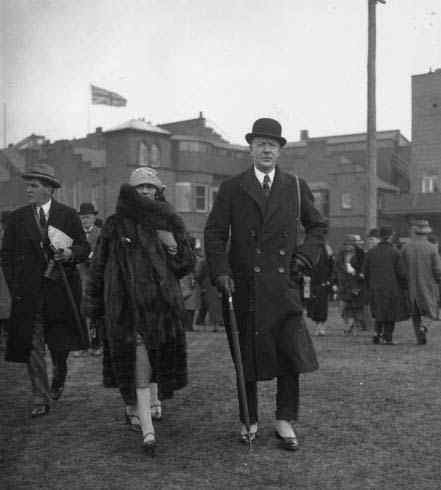
Coco Chanel with Hugh Richard Arthur Grosvenor, 2nd Duke of Westminster

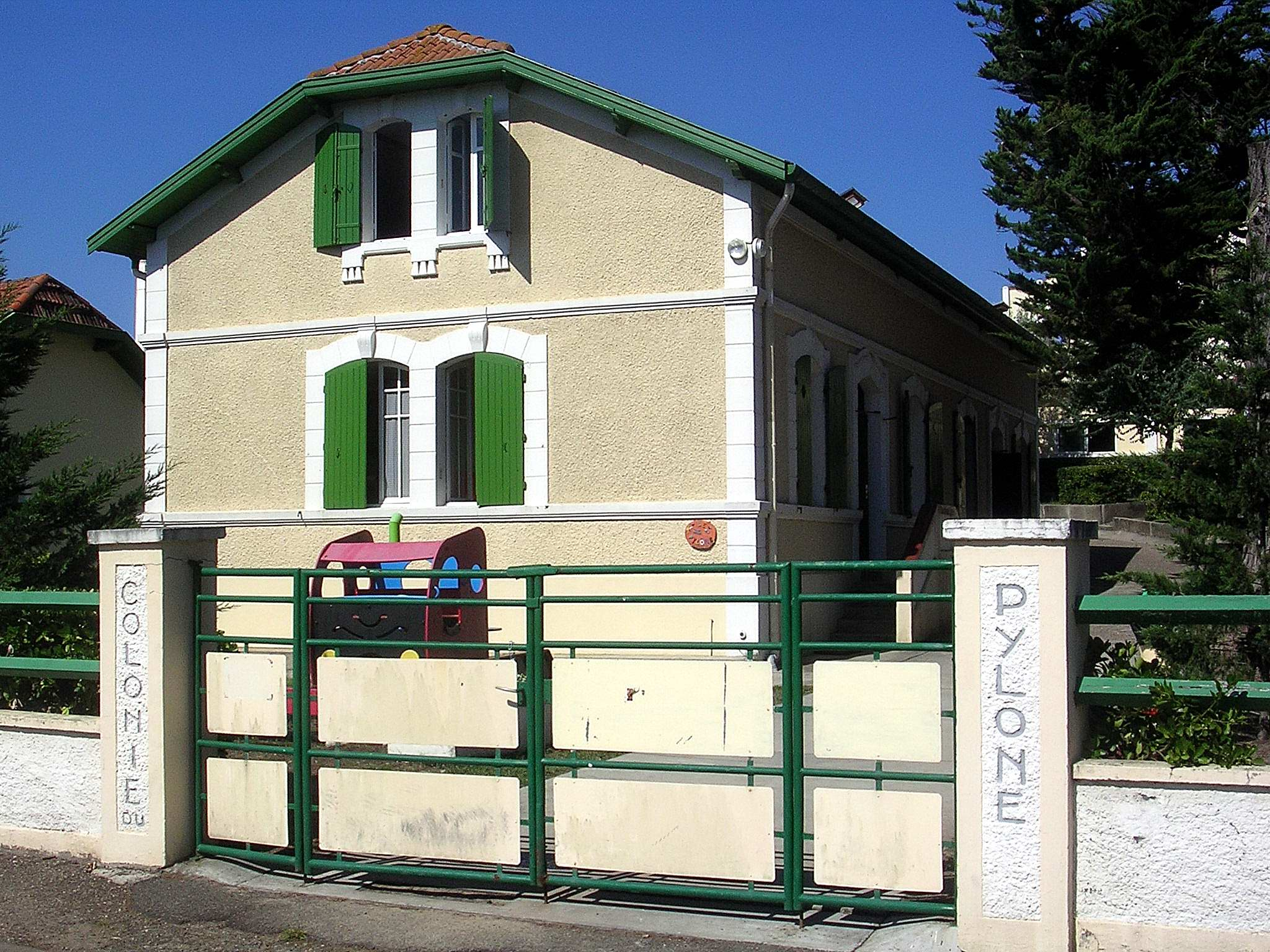
Colony of Pylone, rented by Coco Chanel from 1924 to 1930

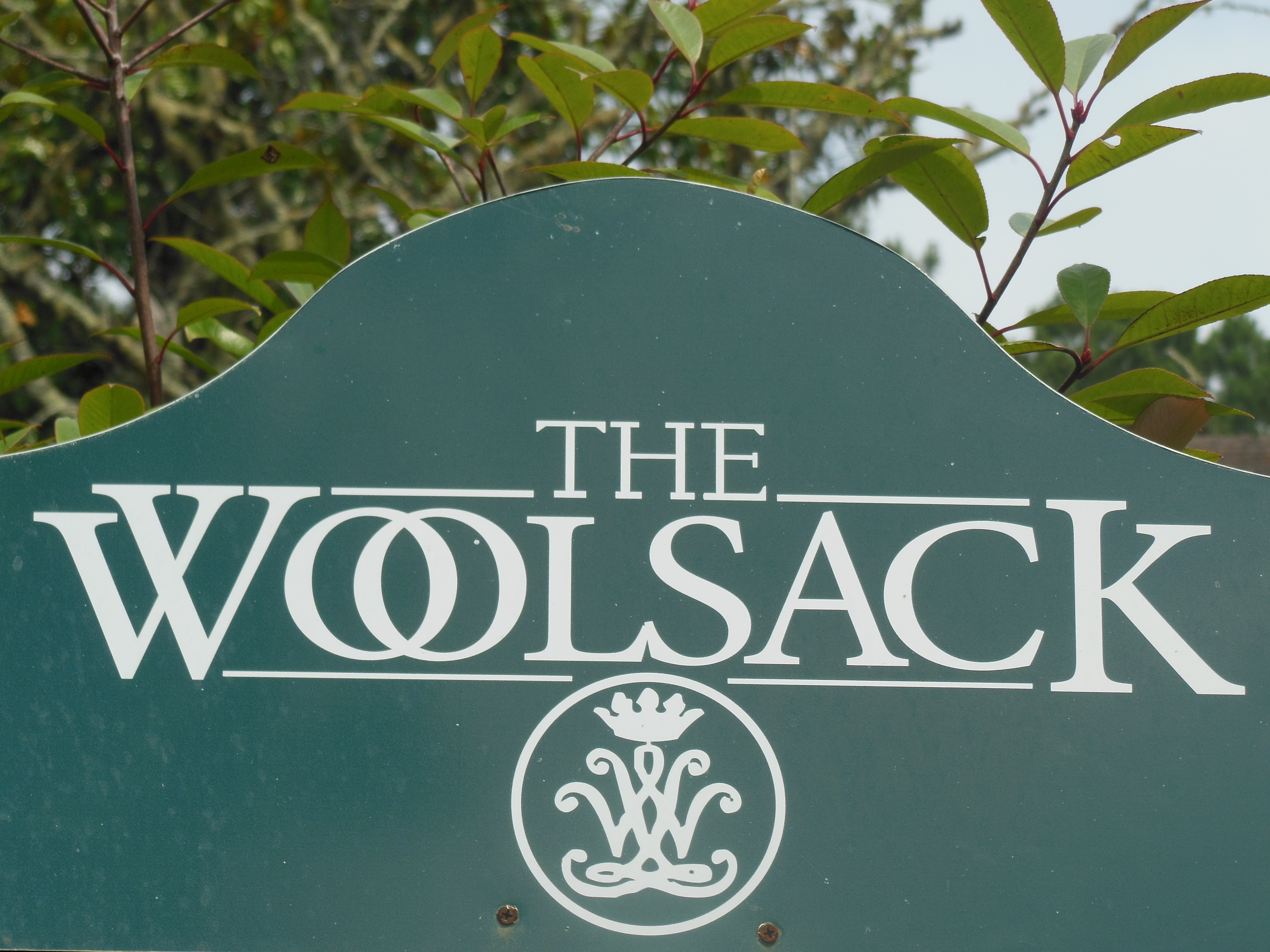
Château Logo

From 1924 to 1930 Coco Chanel was a close friend of the Duke and a privileged visitor to the castle where she came to revitalise herself. She was sometimes in the company of the seamstresses of her workshop to whom she offered a dream holiday in Le Pylon villa, years before the introduction of paid holidays.

Other personalities of the interwar period followed such as: Charlie Chaplin, Salvador Dalí, Suzanne Lenglen, Lloyd George, Georges Carpentier, King Alfonso XIII of Spain, the designer Sem, and Sir Anthony Eden. Winston Churchill, who had been an intimate friend of the Duke since the Boer War, made frequent visits to Woolsack - alone or with his family. He liked to walk on the shores of the lake and sometimes set up his easel to paint. He produced twenty canvases depicting Mimizan and its surroundings.

=== Recreation ===
The area is rich in game. Wild boar and deer are present in excellent areas for the chasse à courre (hunting with hounds) which is the reason for the chateau. Pigeons, thrushes, ortolans, and woodcocks were also highly sought after by the Duke.

During his time the Duke wanted a wild hunting lodge and to limit access to the Lake of Aureilhan. To this end he built a pontoon which was always visible and made the crossing by motorboat.

=== After the Duke ===
In the Second World War, Nazi German troops occupied Mimizan on 28 June 1940. The chateau was requisitioned to house officers. Upon the liberation of France, the house was returned to its owner.

On 7 February 1947 the Duke married for the fourth time to Nancy Anne Winifred Sullivan. When the couple were about to come for a honeymoon in Woolsack, the house caught fire on the night of 23 February 1947 and a large part was burnt. The Duke returned to Woolsack only once before his death in 1953 to decide the sale of his property. Restored by Mr. Sargos, the chateau then became the property of Groupe Gascogne in the 1980s who intended it for seminars and receptions. It is now privately owned by individuals.

== See also ==
- Woolsack
