= Château de la Brangelie =

Château in Nouvelle-Aquitaine, France

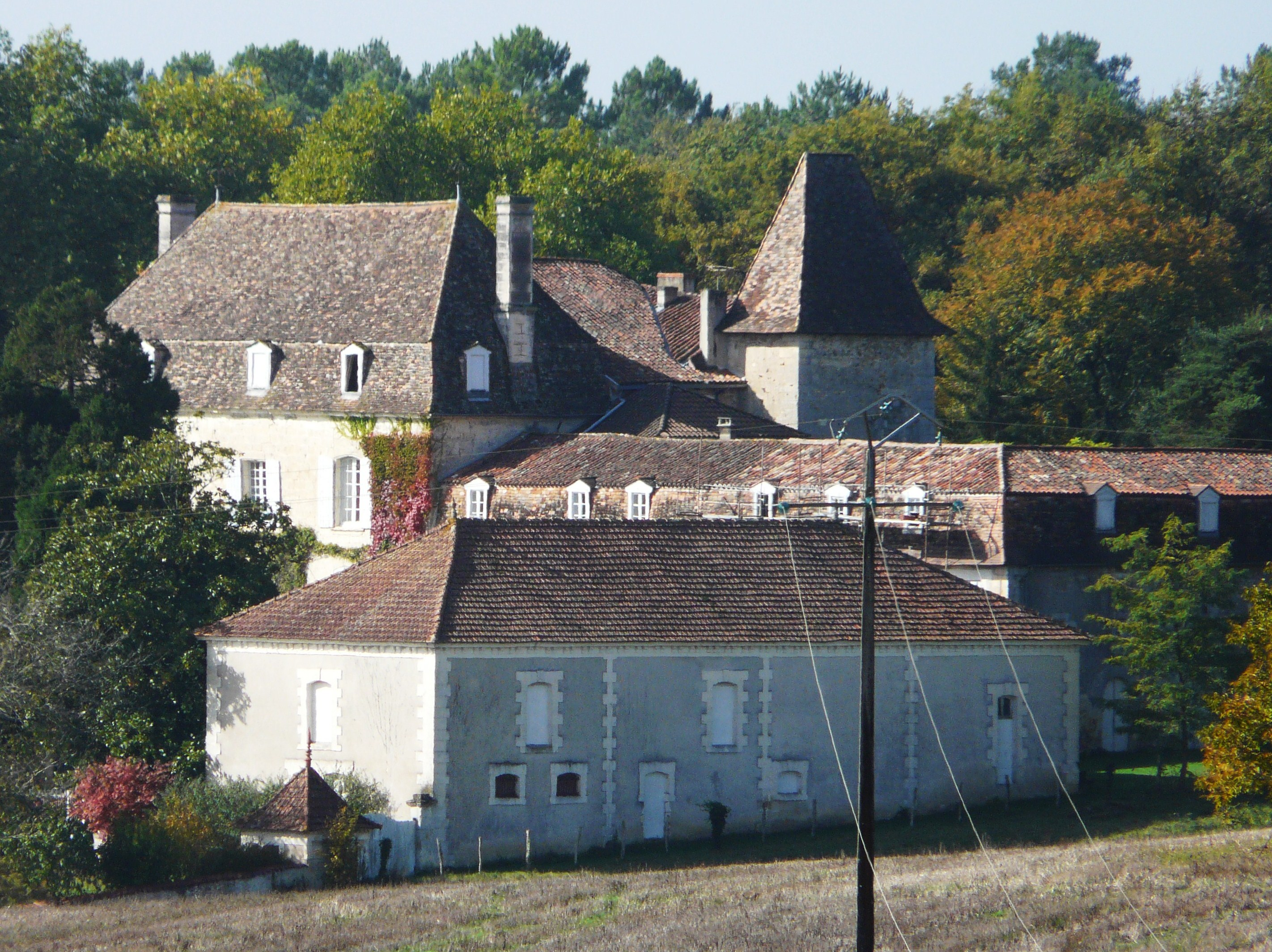

The Château de la Brangelie is a château in the municipality of Vanxains, department of Dordogne, Nouvelle-Aquitaine region of France. It is on the western edge of the departement of Dordogne, 500 meters north-northwest of the town of Vanxains. It is a private property.

On a fortified base from the 15th century, two buildings and outbuildings were connected to the structure in the 18th and 19th centuries. During the French Revolution in 1793, the lord of Brangelie, the Marquis of Vanxains, was kidnapped and strangled in the basement of the château.
