= Bell tower-porch =

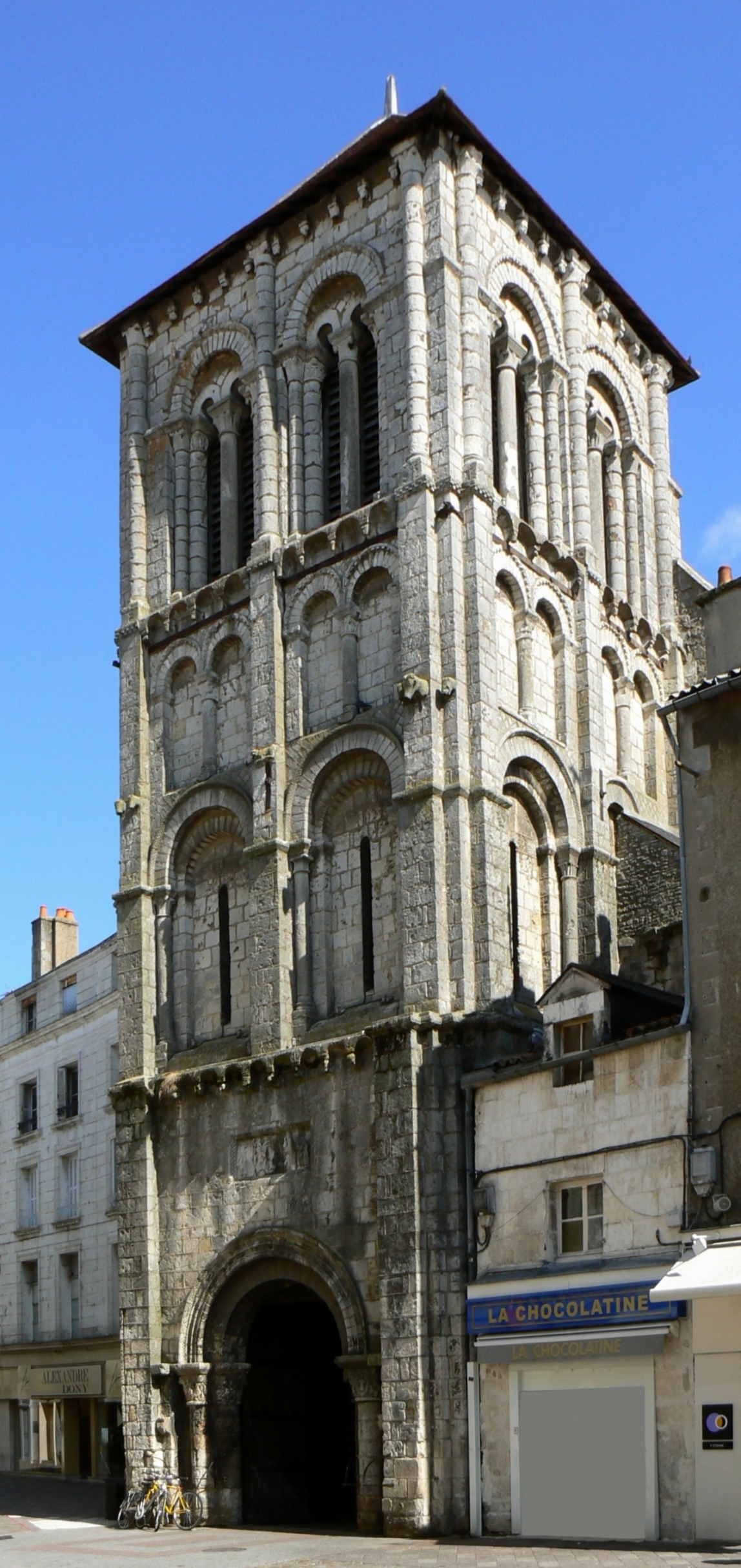
The bell tower-porch of Saint-Porchaire Church (Poitiers)

A bell tower-porch (in French: clocher-porche), or bell tower-portico, is a bell tower that contains a church's main entrance at its base. A tower-porch (tour-porche) is a similar type of structure, though its tower does not contain bells, unlike a bell tower-porch.

== Architecture ==
The porch is integrated into the body of the building, in this case a bell tower, which constitutes the ground floor. The porch is a part of the building or a corridor that forms the anteroom, which has its own roof, in front of the main part of the building to which the anteroom permits access. Therefore, the porch is generally hors-œuvre (literally "outside of the work"), that is to say, distinct from the main building.

The bell tower-porch is generally located in the main entrance of the building, usually in the western facade.

According to Eugène Viollet-le-Duc, bell towers (linked with the presence of bells) only appear in late religious architecture, principally inspired by the Roman Basilica, though they did not have bell towers. The creation of bell towers, then, is modeled after the castle: tall towers that signify the power of the Church, similar to how towers signify military power in other places. It is natural that the bell tower is erected at the churches entrance like an element of fortification, as if to defend its access: giving us the origin of the bell tower-porch. Moreover, churches are often incorporated into a city's system of defense, and some bell towers are consequently fortified. Although the bell tower-porch was initially minimally decorated, its decorative stype became more elaborate over time.

== Use ==
The bell tower-porch is of modest size in the Île-de-France region, not exceeding the width of the side aisles, while in the Central and West regions, they reached much larger sizes. A large bell tower-porch was of the characteristics of Brabantine Gothic (like in St. Rumbold's Cathedral in Mechelen).

Church porches were also converted into thin towers in Anglo-Saxon architecture in England. The most notable English examples were added to the 7th century porches of the churches at Monkwearmouth (Durham) and Titchfield (Hampshire). Bell towers were occasionally combined with main entrances in later English churches, such as Higham Ferrers (13th century), but this was unusual as the main entrance was generally in a separate porch on the south side of the porch, with the tower being solely used by the bell-ringers. Nonetheless, many English churches had a small token west door before the 14th century. After the Reformation, the bell tower-porch was common in the few Stuart and Georgian churches that were built (such as Christopher Wren's in London), as the central entrance conformed well to Classical ideals of symmetry.

== Revival ==
The bell tower-porch was one of the constituent elements of the religious monuments constructed in France in the 19th century. These churches were constructed based on a small set of typical floor plans, and almost always include a bell tower-porch of a rudimentary version of one, often crowned with a single spire, flanked with lanterns (as in Kreisker chapel) or a pavilion roof due to budgetary concerns. Sometimes, either due to budgetary reasons or local tradition, the bell tower-porch ends with a terrace, sometimes with a wrought iron campanile. The French departments that have undertaken a significant reconstruction of their churches, like Loire-Atlantique, have a large majority of churches with a bell tower-porch.

== Image gallery ==
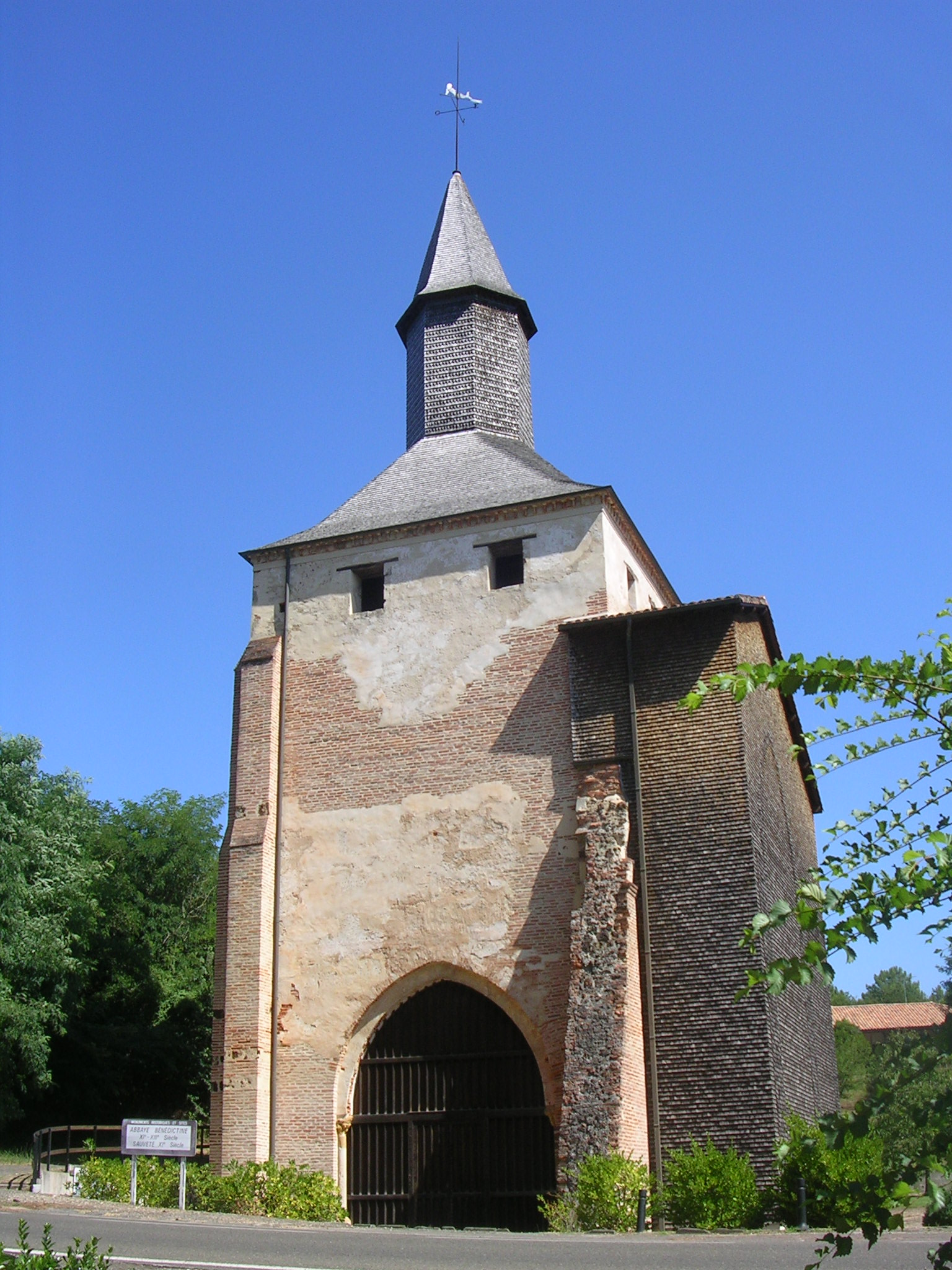
Bell tower-porch in Mimizan (Landes)

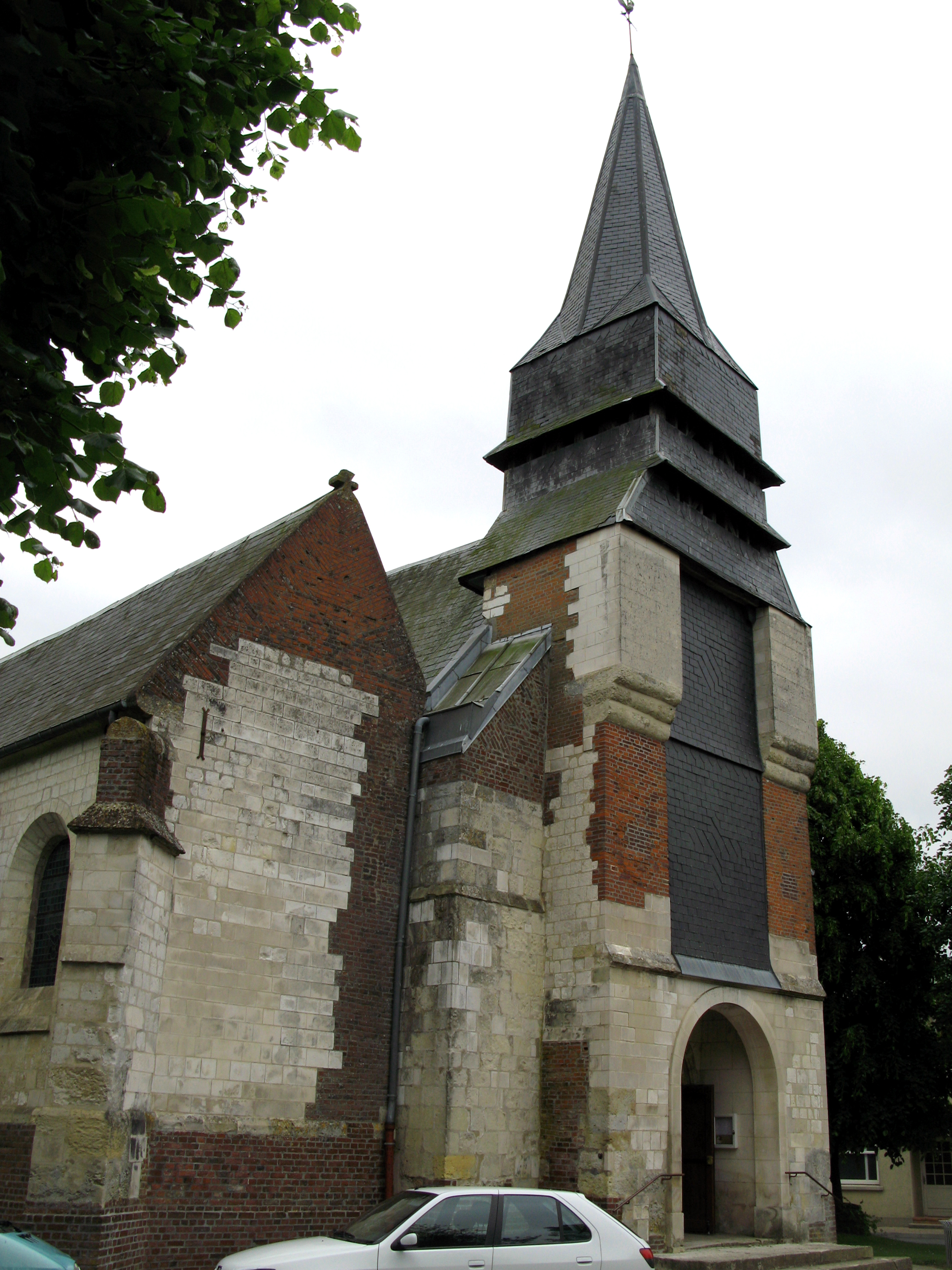
Sains-en-Amiénois

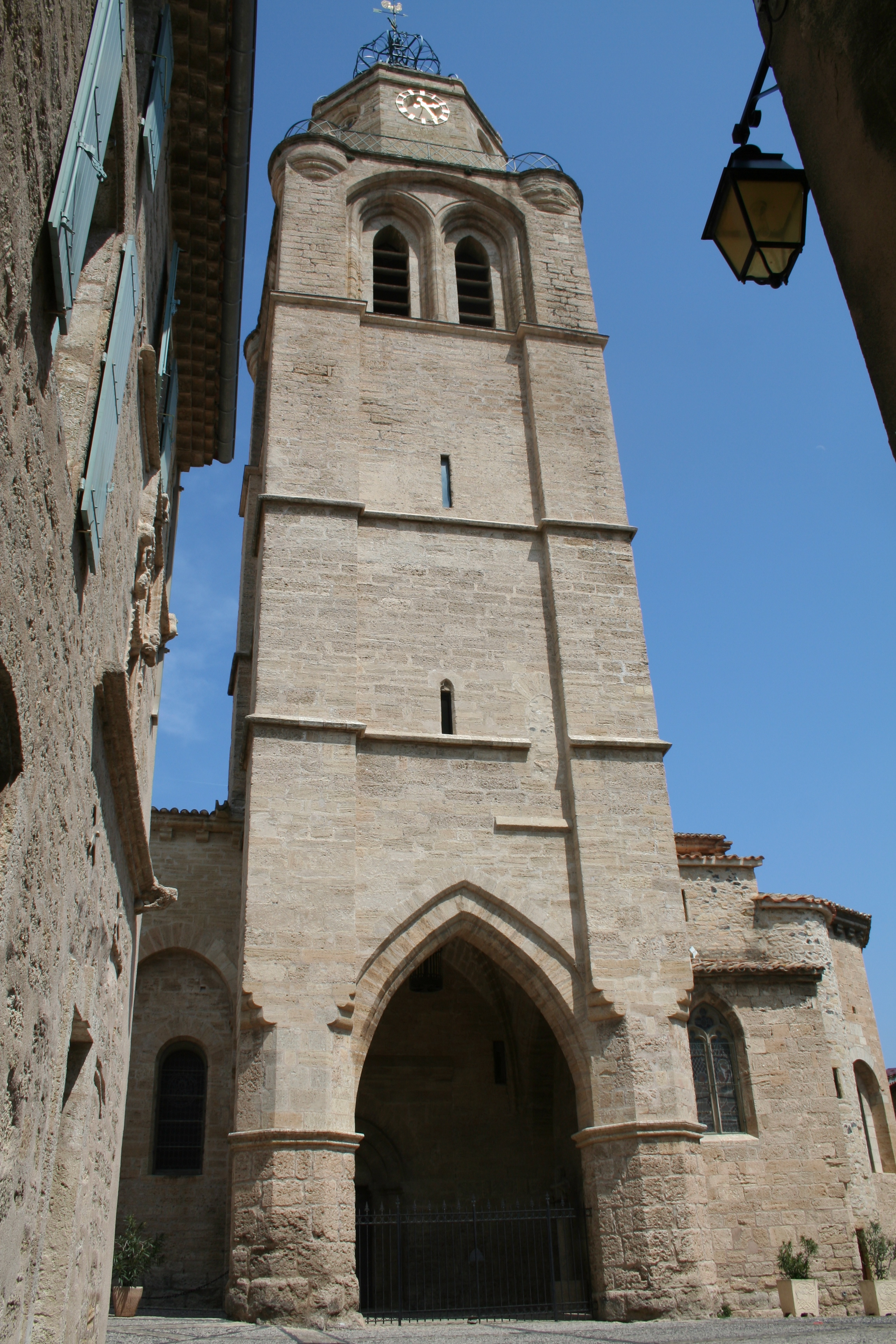
Caux (Hérault)

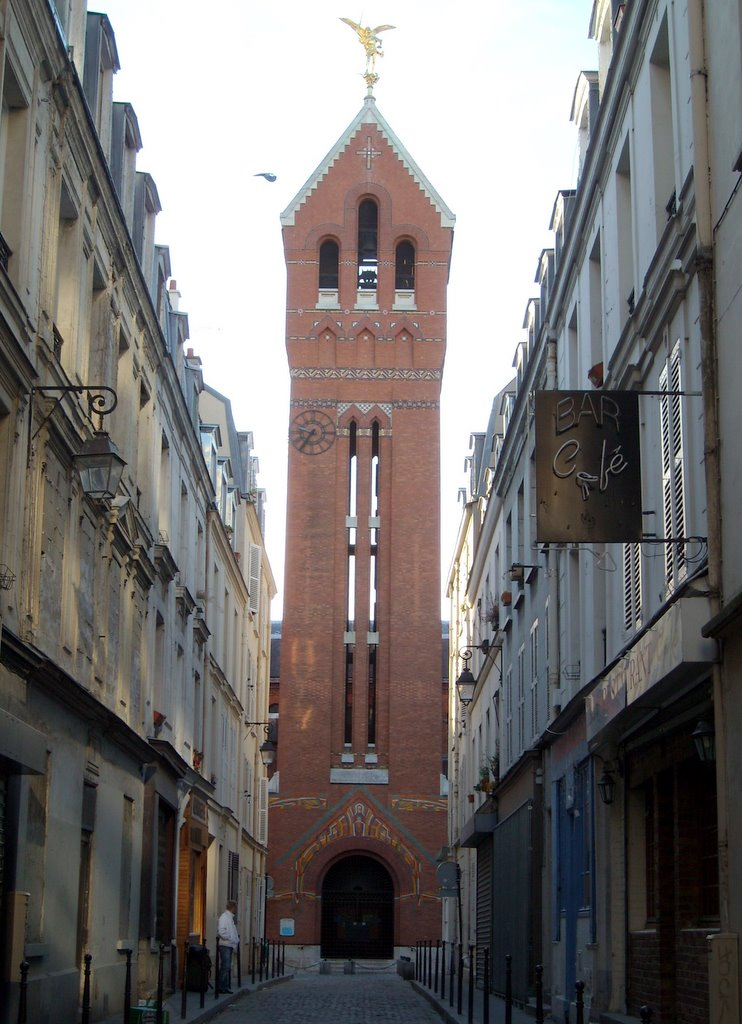
Saint-Michel des Batignolles in Paris

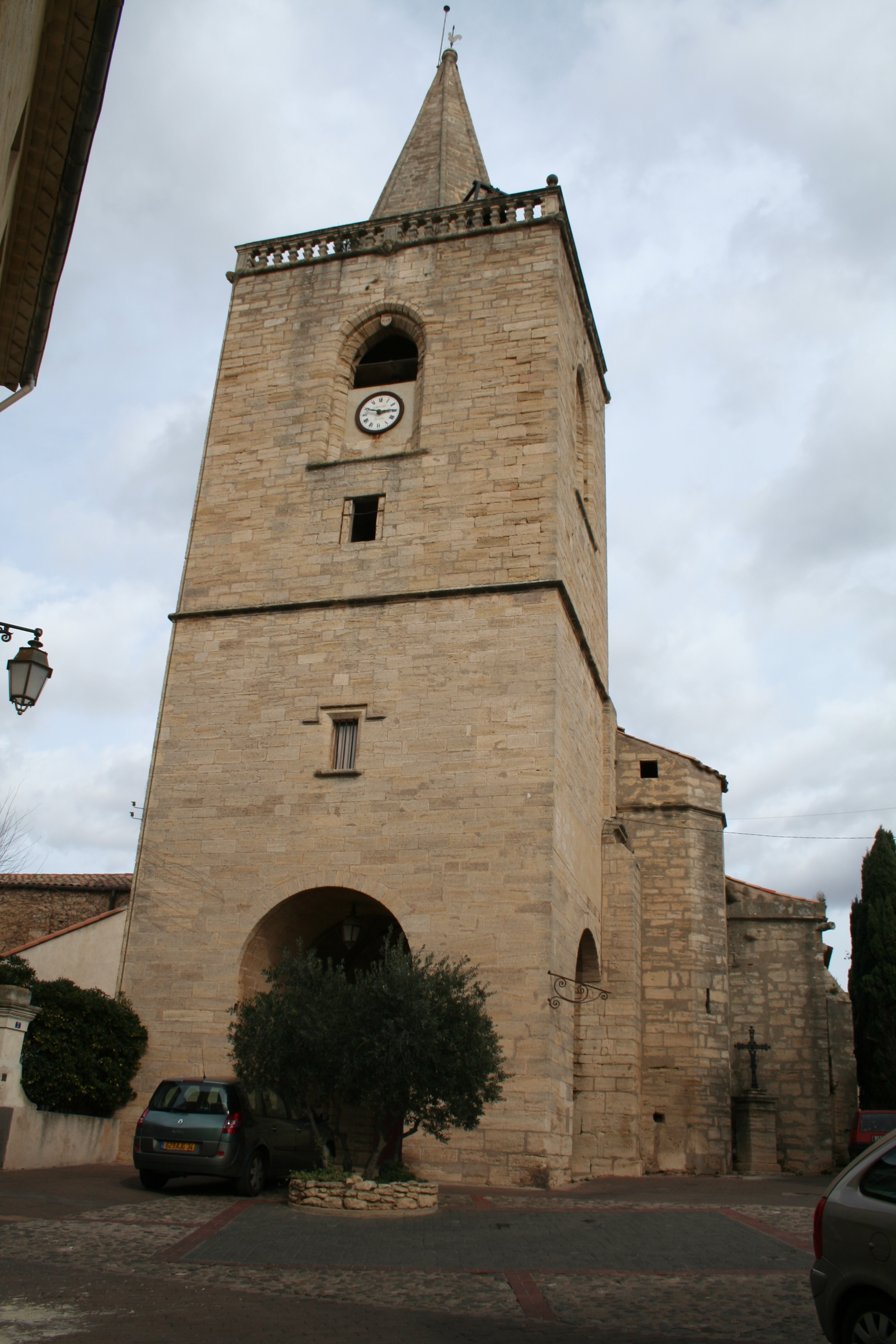
Nézignan-l'Évêque (Hérault)

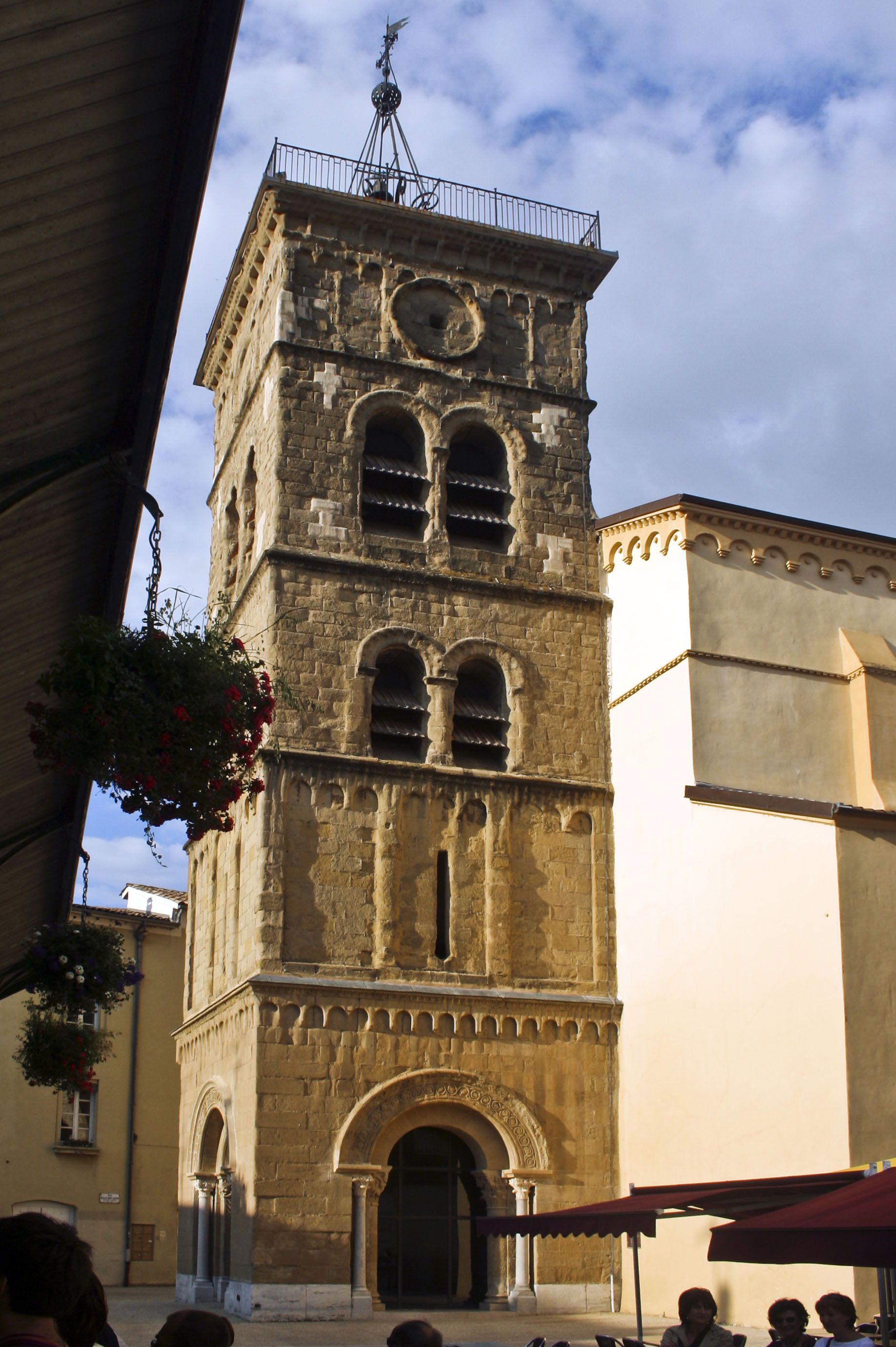
Church of Saint-Jean-Baptiste (Valence)

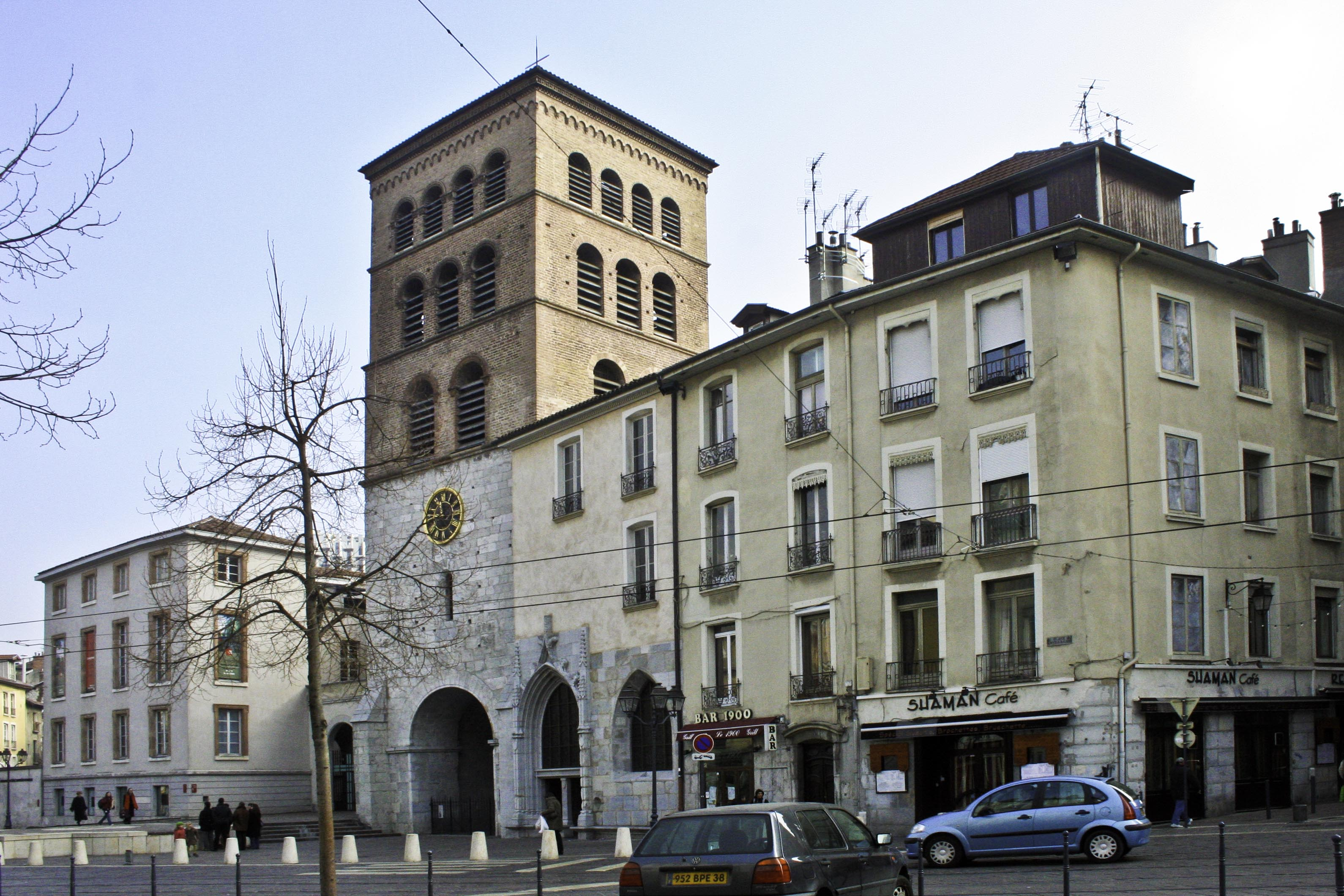
Grenoble Cathedral

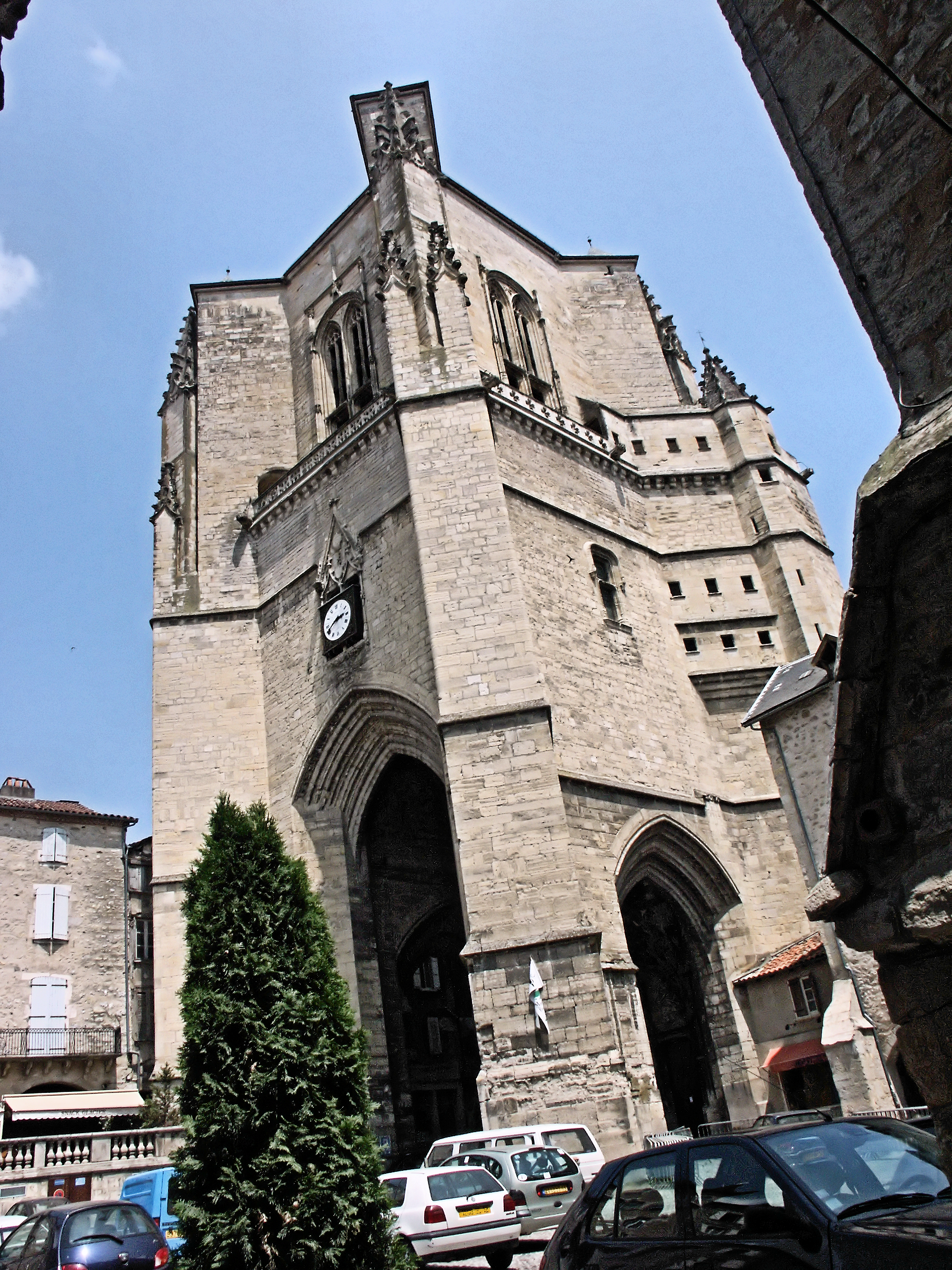
Notre-Dame Collegiate Church inVillefranche-de-Rouergue

Bell tower-porch on the coat of arms of Soppe-le-Haut
English bell tower-porches

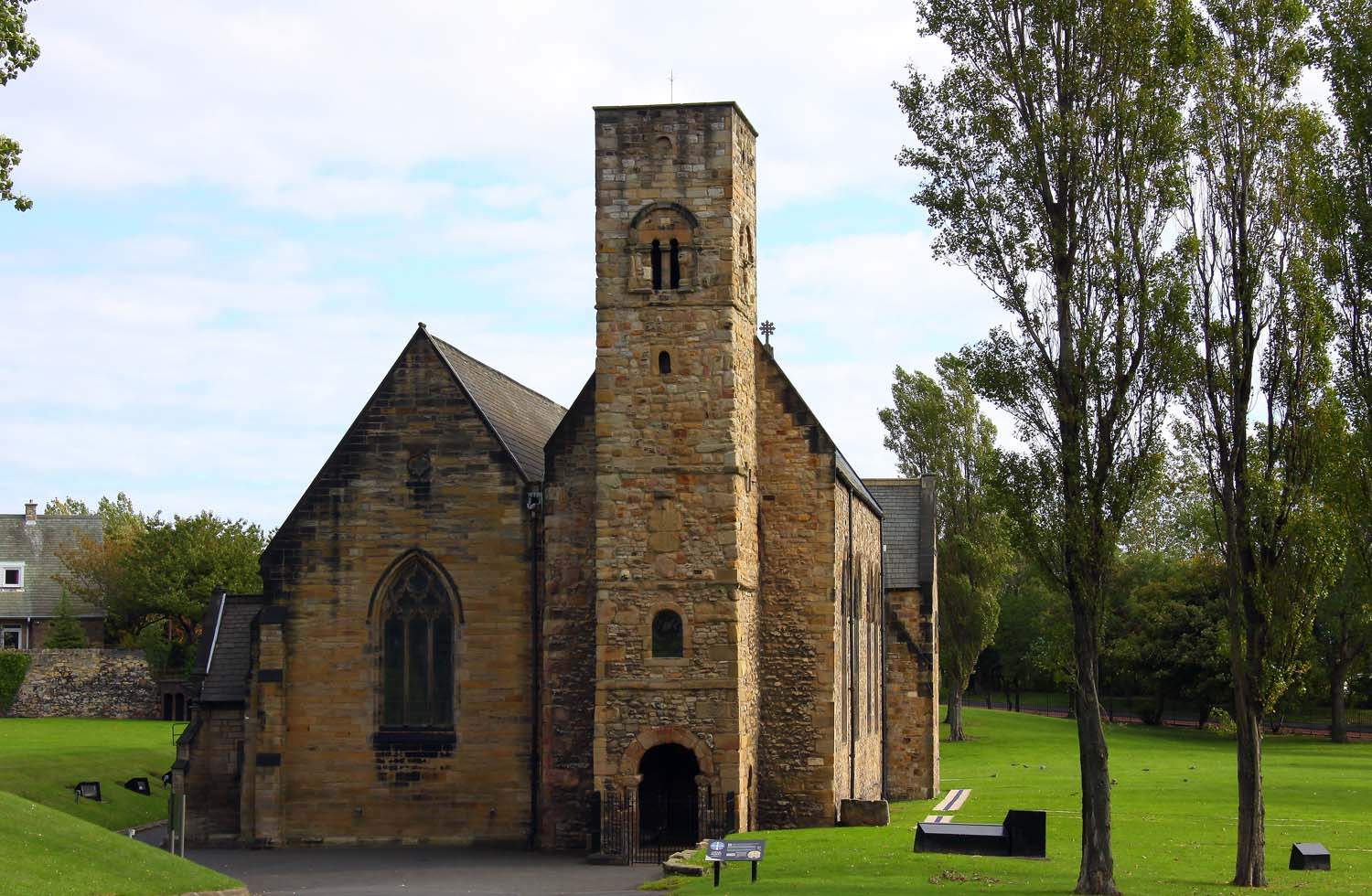
Anglo-Saxon tower-porch at Monkwearmouth (porch 7th century, tower added 10th century).

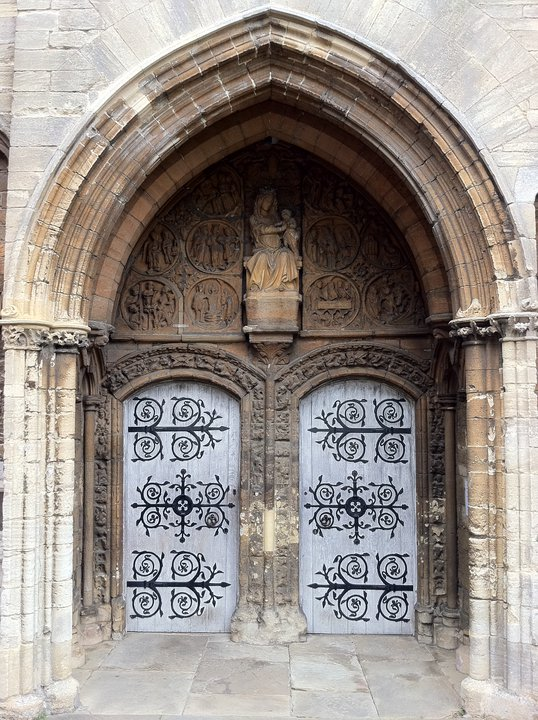
Gothic porch under the bell-tower at Higham Ferrers

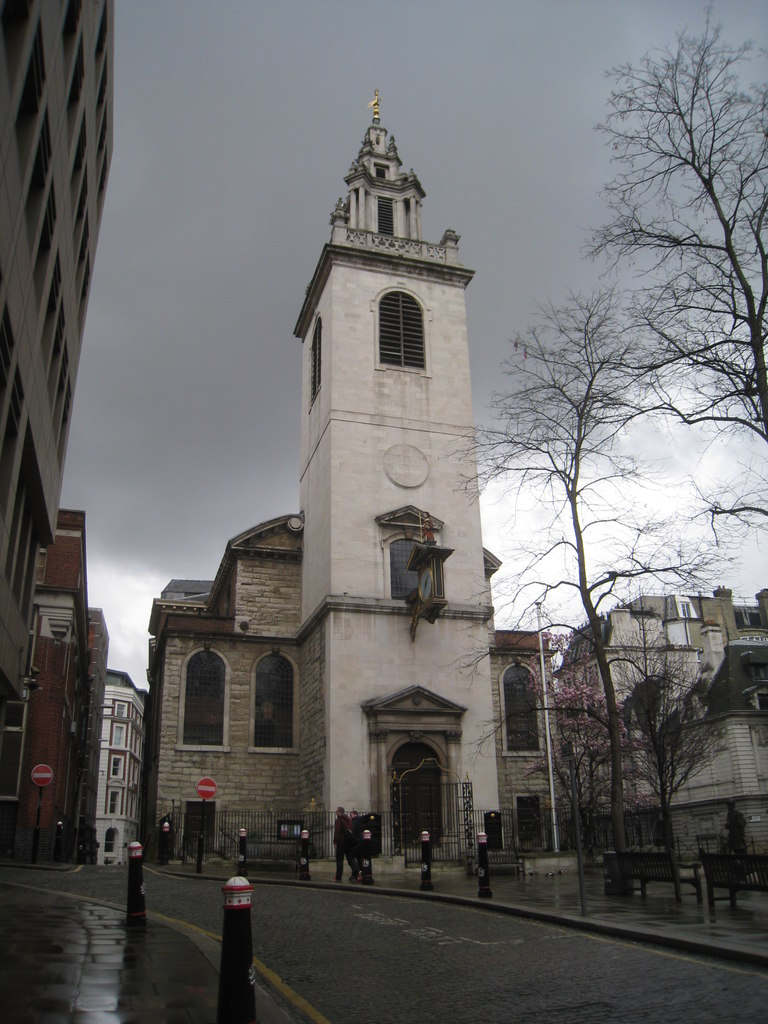
English Baroque bell tower-porch at St James Garlickhythe, London, designed by Christopher Wren and Nicholas Hawksmoor (1676-1717).
Brabantine bell tower-porches

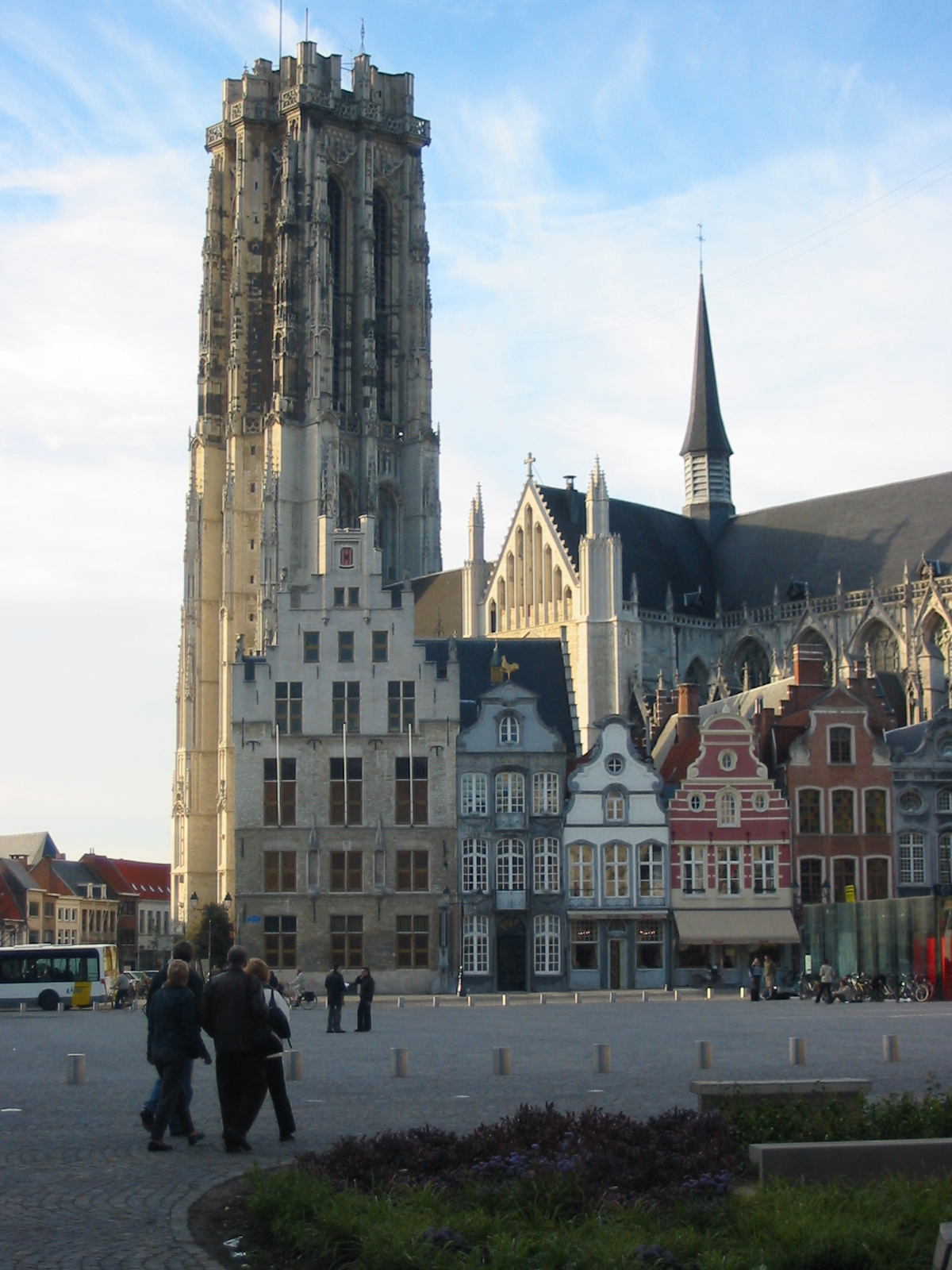
St. Rumbold's Cathedral in Malinas

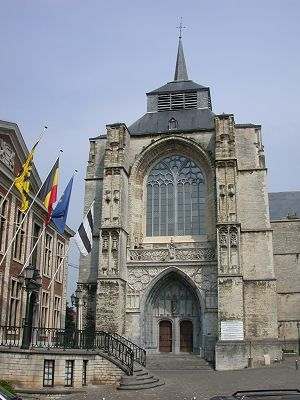
Church of Saint Sulpicius in Diest

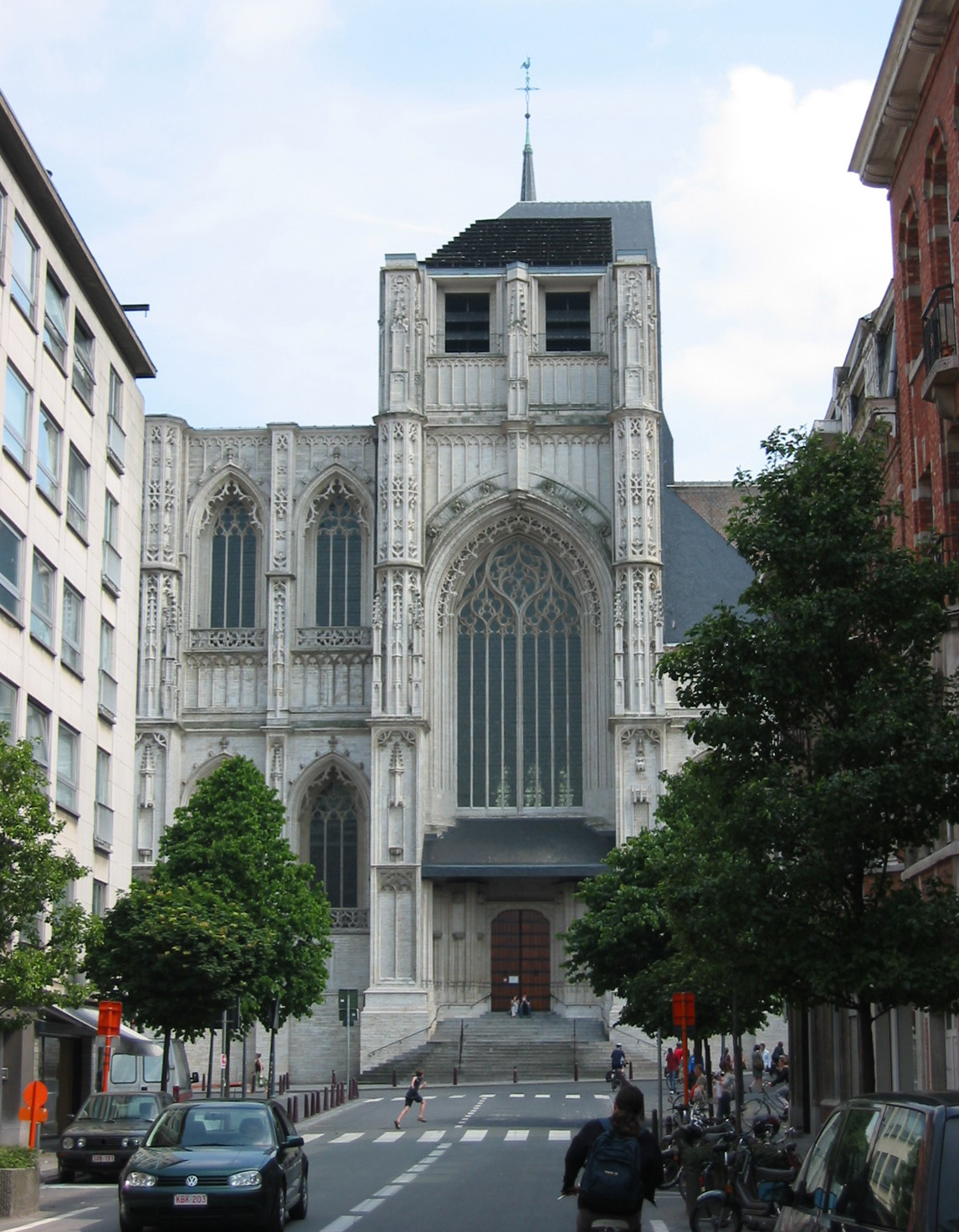
Saint Peter's Church in Leuven

== See also ==
- Bell tower-porch in Mimizan
