= Vanxains =

- Commune
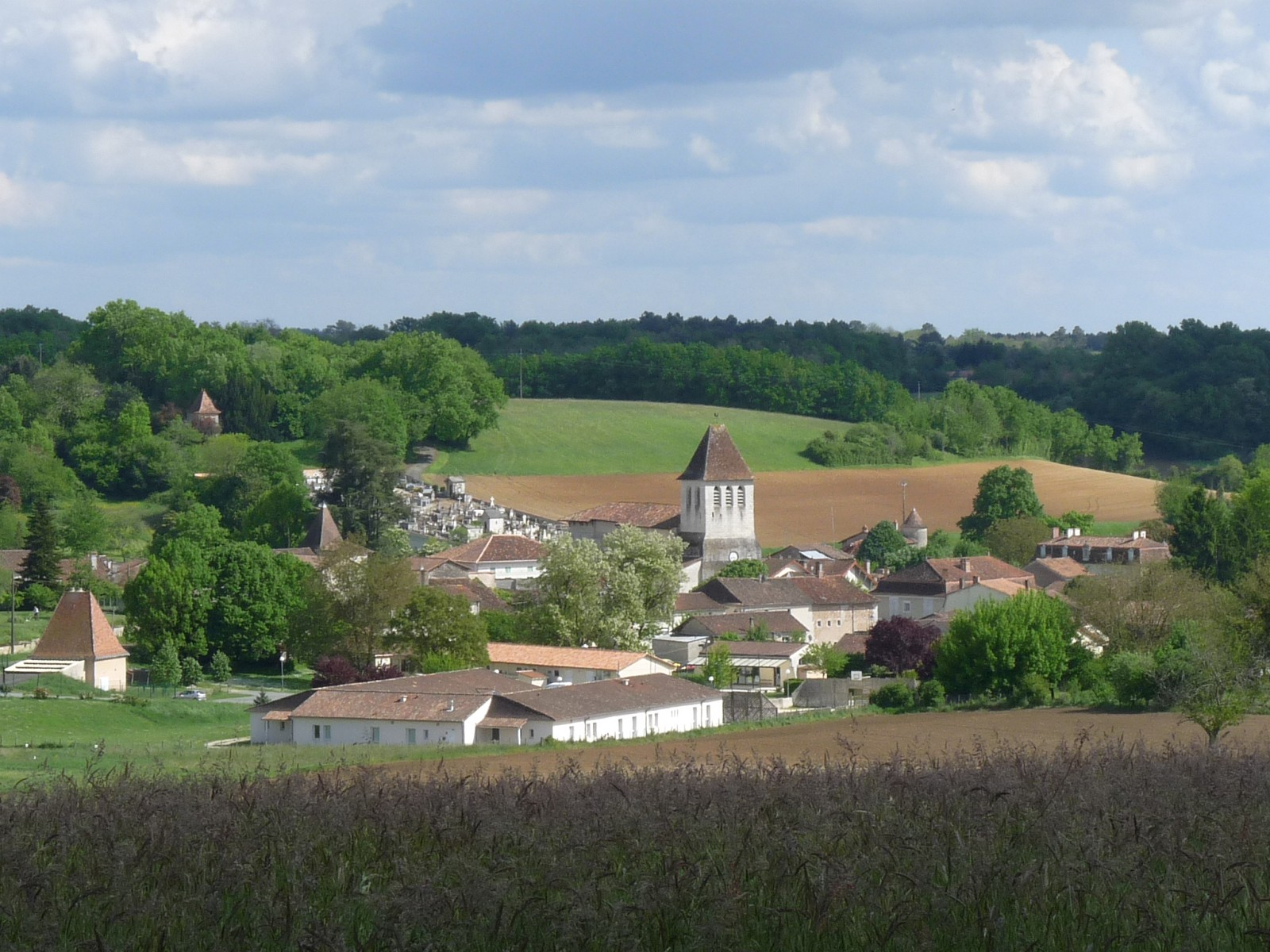
- A general view of Vanxains
- Location of Vanxains
- Location within France Location within Nouvelle-Aquitaine
- Coordinates: 45°13′00″N 0°17′17″E
- Country: France
- Region: Nouvelle-Aquitaine
- Department: Dordogne
- Arrondissement: Périgueux
- Canton: Ribérac
- Intercommunality: Périgord Ribéracois

Government
  - Mayor (2020–2026): Joëlle Saintmartin
- Area^{1}: 35.89 km^{2} (13.86 sq mi)
- Elevation: 110 m (360 ft)
- Highest elevation: 161 m (528 ft)
- Lowest elevation: 52 m (171 ft)
- Population (2023): 689
  - Density: 19.2/km^{2} (49.7/sq mi)
- Time zone: UTC+01:00 (CET)
  - Summer (DST): UTC+02:00 (CEST)
- INSEE/Postal code: 24564 /24600
- ^{1} French Land Register data, which excludes lakes, ponds, glaciers > 1 km^{2} (0.386 sq mi or 247 acres) and river estuaries.

Vanxains (French pronunciation: [vɑ̃ksɛ̃]; Occitan: Vansens) is a commune in the Dordogne department in Nouvelle-Aquitaine in southwestern France. The Château de la Brangelie is located just southeast of the village.

== Population ==
Historical population
Year	Pop.	±% p.a.
1968	641	—
1975	556	−2.01%
1982	591	+0.88%
1990	665	+1.49%
1999	665	+0.00%
2007	751	+1.53%
2012	705	−1.26%
2017	700	−0.14%
2023	689	−0.26%
Source: INSEE

== Sights ==
- Château de la Brangelie
- Château Trompette

== See also ==
- Communes of the Dordogne department
