= Le Haut-Soultzbach =

Commune in Grand Est, France

- Commune
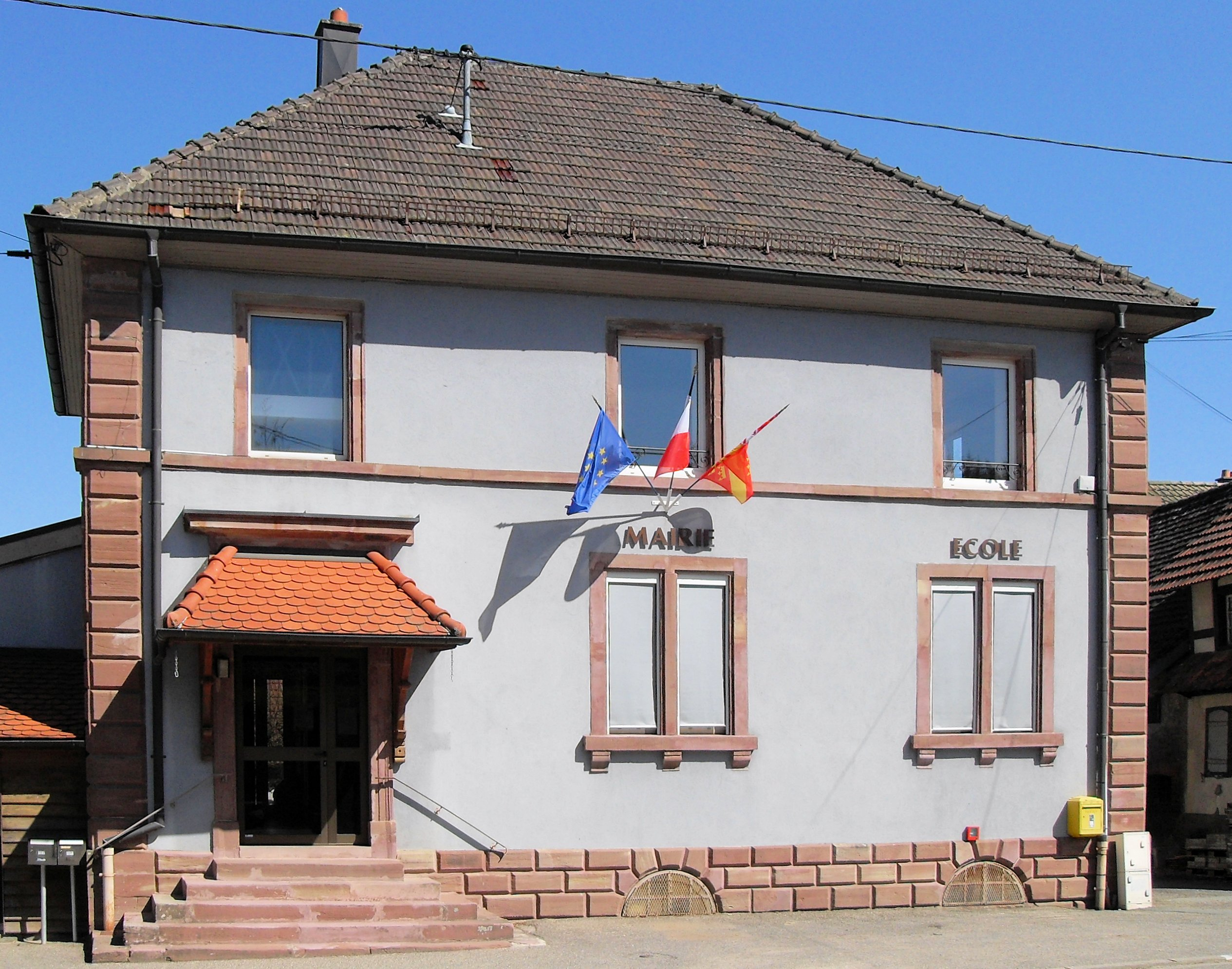
- The town hall and school in Mortzwiller
- Location of Le Haut-Soultzbach
- Location within France Location within Grand Est
- Coordinates: 47°44′28″N 7°02′17″E
- Country: France
- Region: Grand Est
- Department: Haut-Rhin
- Arrondissement: Thann-Guebwiller
- Canton: Masevaux-Niederbruck

Government
  - Mayor (2020–2026): Franck Dudt
- Area^{1}: 11.60 km^{2} (4.48 sq mi)
- Population (2023): 879
  - Density: 75.8/km^{2} (196/sq mi)
- Time zone: UTC+01:00 (CET)
  - Summer (DST): UTC+02:00 (CEST)
- INSEE/Postal code: 68219 /68780
- ^{1} French Land Register data, which excludes lakes, ponds, glaciers > 1 km^{2} (0.386 sq mi or 247 acres) and river estuaries.

Le Haut-Soultzbach is a commune in the Haut-Rhin department of northeastern France. The municipality was established on 1 January 2016 and consists of the former communes of Mortzwiller and Soppe-le-Haut.

== See also ==
- Communes of the Haut-Rhin department
