= Soppe-le-Haut =

Part of Le Haut-Soultzbach in Grand Est, France

- Part of Le Haut-Soultzbach
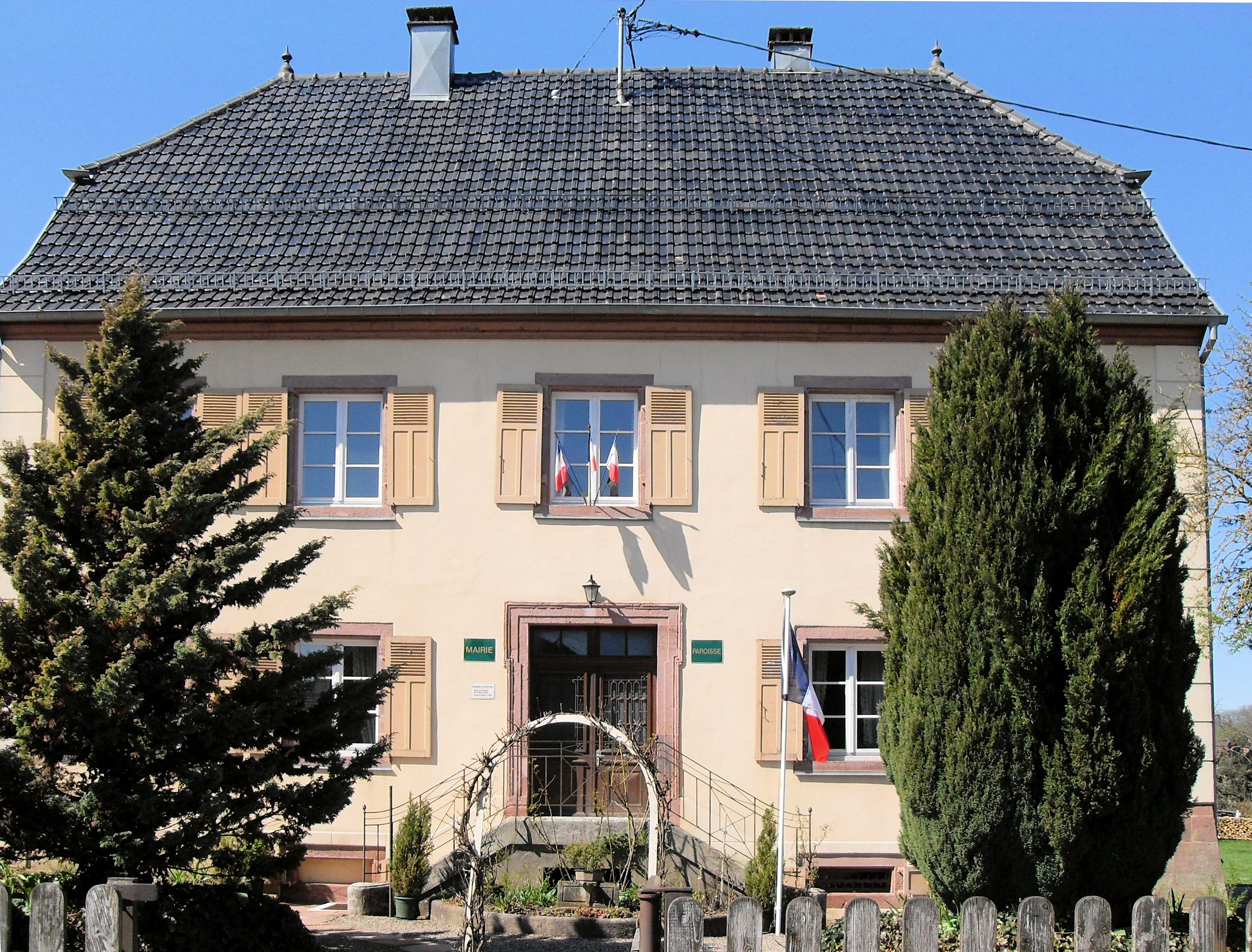

- Coat of arms
- Location of Soppe-le-Haut
- Location within France Location within Grand Est
- Coordinates: 47°43′58″N 7°03′42″E
- Country: France
- Region: Grand Est
- Department: Haut-Rhin
- Arrondissement: Thann-Guebwiller
- Canton: Masevaux-Niederbruck
- Commune: Le Haut-Soultzbach
- Area^{1}: 7.37 km^{2} (2.85 sq mi)
- Elevation: 335 m (1,099 ft)
- Highest elevation: 403 m (1,322 ft)
- Lowest elevation: 317 m (1,040 ft)
- Population (2022): 528
  - Density: 71.6/km^{2} (186/sq mi)
- Time zone: UTC+01:00 (CET)
  - Summer (DST): UTC+02:00 (CEST)
- Postal code: 68780
- ^{1} French Land Register data, which excludes lakes, ponds, glaciers > 1 km^{2} (0.386 sq mi or 247 acres) and river estuaries.

Soppe-le-Haut (French pronunciation: [sɔp lə o]; German: Obersulzbach; Alsatian: Ewersulzbàch) is a former commune in the Haut-Rhin department in north-eastern France. On 1 January 2016, it was merged into the new commune Le Haut-Soultzbach.

== See also ==
- Communes of the Haut-Rhin department
