= Étang d'Aureilhan =

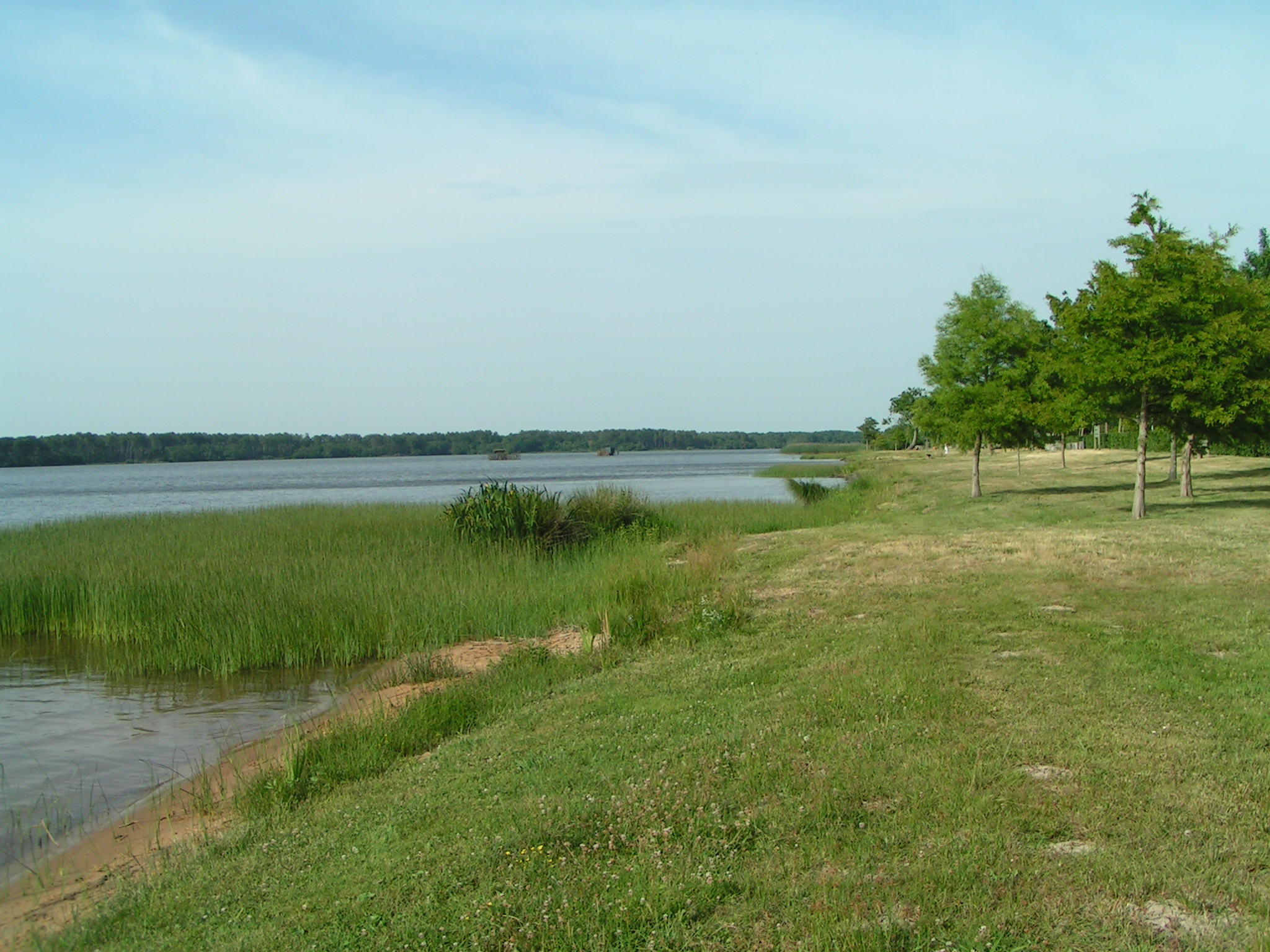

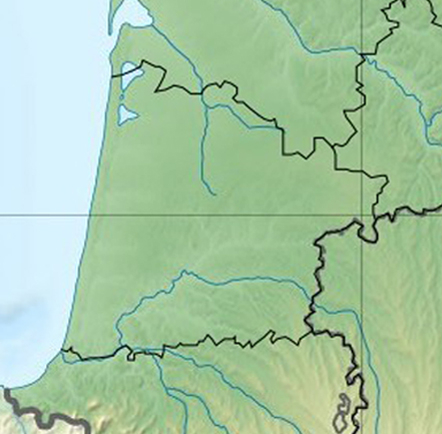
- Location within Landes (department)
- Location: Landes
- Coordinates: 44°13′35″N 1°12′30″W
- Primary outflows: courant de Mimizan
- Basin countries: France
- Surface area: 3.4 km^{2} (1.3 sq mi)
- Max. depth: 8 m (26 ft)
- Surface elevation: 10 m (33 ft)

Étang d'Aureilhan or Lac d'Aureilhan is a lake at Aureilhan in the Landes department, France. At an elevation of 10 m, its surface area is 3.4 km^{2}.
