= Joël Le Tac =

French politician and journalist (1918–2005)

Joel Le Tac in France

Joël Andre Le Tac (15 February 1918 – 8 October 2005) was a member of the Free French Forces (FFF) during the Second World War.

Le Tac played a prominent role in Operation Savanna and then in Operation Josephine B. He set up the Overcloud network in Brittany and carried out a number of operations. Le Tac, along with members of his family, were captured, interrogated and imprisoned in a succession of concentration camps.

He served in a French UN battalion during the Korean War.

He later had a career as a journalist and as a politician.

== Early years ==
Joël Le Tac was born 15 February 1918 in Paris.

== WWII ==
In 1939, Le Tac was studying law. Just after the outbreak of war, on 16 September, while he was preparing for the entrance examination for the School of Engineering at Versailles, he was mobilized. He requested, and was granted, a transfer to an infantry platoon as a reserve officer.

When France fell to the German advance, he refused the armistice and with some friends, including Henri Karcher, went to Saint-Jean-de-Luz. The tiny fishing port in the southwestern corner of the Bay of Biscay was crowded with civilians and French and Polish troops trying to get away from German forces. Here, the fishermen used their sardine boats to ferry passengers through heavy seas to any of a number of larger vessels that had gathered there. On 24 June, Le Tac boarded the cargo vessel Baron Nairn.

Arriving in Liverpool, Le Tac joined the Free French Forces and was soon assigned to Captain Georges Bergé. Bergé was attached to the Special Operations Executive (SOE), a British organisation that had been created by Minister of Economic Warfare Hugh Dalton on 22 July 1940. The SOE was formed to conduct espionage, sabotage and reconnaissance in occupied Europe against the Axis powers, and to aid local resistance movements.

On 20 December 1940, Bergé mentioned in an interview that there would be advantages to parachuting into France on moonlit nights. As a direct result of this interview, in February 1941, Bergé and ten of his men received special training. This included being sent to Station XVII, the British Secret Service's sabotage and assassination training school at Brickendon. The commandant, Major CV Clarke, was responsible for the training of SOE agents in sabotage. Clarke was a creative explosives expert who had invented novel weapons including the limpet mines that SOE would find so useful. While he was there, Bergé was invited to carry out an important mission: Operation Savanna, a plan to kill German pathfinder pilots who operated near Vannes in Brittany.

=== Operation Savanna ===
Savanna was a mission to ambush and kill as many pilots as possible of the Kampfgeschwader 100, a German Pathfinder formation stationed at Meucon airfield which spearheaded night raids on Britain. Le Tac was one of five Free French selected for the operation.

Initial planning called for men to be deployed from the sea, but this was changed to a parachute drop that inevitably involved the Royal Air Force (RAF). Sir Charles Portal, Chief of the Air Staff objected when he learned that "what one can only call assassins" (Note: Portal quoted by Keene.) were to be parachuted while wearing civilian clothes. Eventually, the SOE's chief executive Gladwyn Jebb persuaded Portal that Savanna should go ahead, but the operation had by then been delayed by some weeks.

The Savanna team was dropped on the moonlit night of 15 March 1941. They buried their equipment and reconnoitred. Soon they discovered that their plan was out of date: the pathfinder pilots were no longer being transported en masse by bus as they had planned for, rather they now travelled by car in groups of just two or three. Prevarication had cost the SOE the opportunity to make a dramatic surgical strike. Unable to complete the operation, the team was ordered to disperse. Bergé took the opportunity to slip into the unoccupied zone of France to meet the father of a girl who worked for General de Gaulle in London and whom he meant to marry.

Bergé, Le Tac, and Adjutant Jean Forman got to a remote beach near Sables d'Olonne in the Vendee to rendezvous with the submarine HMS Tigris. On the first pickup night, Major Geoffrey Appleyard and André Desgrange set off from the submarine towards the shore. Desgrange's canoe was holed and damaged on the rocks and had to be abandoned. They searched in vain for the Savanna team, but in fact they were on the wrong beach. By prior agreement, another pickup was attempted four nights later. As the two remaining canoes were being prepared a large wave washed over the submarine and one of the canoes was lost; only Appleyard's canoe remained. Appleyard pulled away from the submarine in the heavy swell only to be capsized into the freezing water several times before he made it away from the submarine. Appleyard paddled three miles to the shore and, in a desperate bid to make contact quickly, he ran up and down the shoreline shouting and waving his torch until, at last, he saw an answering flashlight. With time running out – Tigris would dive at 0300 hours regardless – the Savanna team faced a stark choice: there was only room in the canoe for two passengers and there was no time for a second trip. Le Tac chose to stay ashore. Appleyard took Bergé and Forman, they struggled through the heavy sea just reaching the submarine in time. Appleyard was awarded the Military Cross for his "gallant and distinguished services in the field" for his part in the operation.

Although Savanna failed in its main mission it proved the viability of dropping men into, and extracting them from, occupied France. Also, the men who returned to Britain brought with them a mass of valuable intelligence about aspects of everyday life under occupation: curfew rules, transport regulations, rations, prices and examples of identity papers.

Le Tac made his way to Paris and made contact with the resistance there. Le Tac and his brother made two more reconnaissances in an attempt to attack the pathfinder pilots, but nothing developed from his efforts.

=== Operation Josephine B ===
In May 1941, Forman returned to France for Operation Josephine B, a plan to break into a transformer station in Pessac, near Bordeaux, and destroy it with bombs and incendiaries. He was accompanied by sub-Lieutenants Raymond Cabard and André Varnier. The party, who had been trained and equipped by SOE, including – just as for Savanna – at Station XVII under CV Clarke, (Note: Clarke was prepared to flout military convention in order to provide realistic training. One dark night, he took a team to Luton Power Station where they used scaling ladders to get over the walls, evaded the guards, placed dummy explosives on transformers and made their getaway. Clarke then used a forged pass to perform an on-the-spot inspection, quickly found the dummy explosives and said to the subaltern in charge of the Guard: "Alright old man, you say nothing about this and I'll say nothing about it. But you've learned your lesson.") dropped by parachute into the Bordeaux region. The men hid their equipment and reconnoitred the target. They were dismayed to discover a high tension wire just inside the top of the 9-foot-high (2.7 m) perimeter wall and the sound of people moving about inside. They also failed to obtain bicycles on which they had planned to make a silent get-away. Discouraged, they lost heart and abandoned their mission. Having missed their pick-up to return to Britain, Forman made his way to Paris where he met Le Tac – he had been given a couple of possible addresses before he left England. Le Tac would not hear of giving up the Josephine attack and he led the SOE party back to the Bordeaux region.

In the night, they seized a truck to go up to Pessac; the truck broke down, so they resorted to bicycles. They quickly found their explosives where they had hidden them on the first night: in ferns a hundred meters from the transformer station. Varner verified that the detonators would still work in spite of the moisture. On the night of 7 June 1941, Forman climbed the perimeter wall and jumped down into the yard while carefully avoiding any contact with the high voltage cable. Then he simply opened the door to his comrades who brought in all their equipment. In less than half an hour plastic explosive contained in boxes and connected to magnetic incendiary bombs was placed on each of the eight main transformers. The four men made their get-away, pedaling with all their might, as explosions sounded and flames rose into the sky. Searchlights vainly probed the sky for bombers.

The Josephine attack destroyed six of the eight transformers. This was a significant success: badly hampering rail traffic, local armaments factories, and, most significantly, operations at the Bordeaux U-boat base. LeTac and the rest of the Josephine party headed south and crossed the Pyrenees into Spain and then made their way back to Britain via Gibraltar.

The [Josephine] saboteurs missed a Lysander that called for them, and set out for Spain at their leisure; they got through a quarter of a million francs (about £1,400 (Note: Equivalent to £22,772 today.)) in two months, and left a trail of broken glass if not of broken hearts behind them.

— M.R.D. Foot

The success of Operation Josephine B raised SOE's reputation and, as a direct result, SOE set up its own RF (République Française) or Gaullist section.

=== Overcloud network ===
Le Tac volunteered to go back to France to build up an organization through which people could covertly be passed into and out of the country. Le Tac's parents were both teachers and they had a holiday villa at Saint-Pabu, a village on the north-western tip of the Breton peninsula. Consequently, the family knew the area well. It had three rocky islets (Guennoc, Tariec and Rosservor) which were not permanently occupied by the Germans. Tariec and Rosservor had the further advantage that they could be reached on foot at low tide and all three islets were used for clandestine landings. The Le Tac family were enthusiastic resistors, but the British did not know that they had already come to the attention of the Germans: Madame Le Tac and her future daughter-in-law Andrée had been briefly detained for trying to help a British pilot who had come down in the sea.

On 14 October 1941 Joël Le Tac crossed by small boat with radio operator Comte de Kergorlay. They came ashore on a pair of canoes lashed together as an improvised catamaran. This gave the stability needed to carry the heavy, precious radio set and it allowed Le Tac to concentrate on navigation while de Kergorlay, who had no natural skill with boats, simply paddled. Together with his brother Yves (and with some help from their mother) they set up the Overcloud network around the northwest of Breton. An attempt was made to drop arms to them, but the consignment was found by peasants who told the police. The network was able to maintain contact with a number of bodies of resisters.

Joël Le Tac made arrangements for his brother and himself to be returned to Britain to report back. As the pick-up boats approached the coastline at 2300 on 31 December 1941 the sky was suddenly filled with rockets, flares and anti-aircraft tracer ammunition. The crew, which included Brooks Richards, thought that there must be a major air-raid. When they made contact with a canoe from the shore, it contained Yves Le Tac and Fred Scamaroni, they explained that the earlier pyrotechnics had simply been the Germans celebrating the New Year which came one hour before midnight by British time. Yves asked Richards to take Scamaroni to Britain (Scamaroni had come from Dakar and was on his way to report to General De Gaulle) and to return in a week's time to collect Joël, himself, and a number of other passengers. Yves returned by canoe taking with him Moureau, a new radio operator, and his new radio.

Would be travellers gathered at the Le Tac villa: Joël and Yves Le Tac, Forman (Operations Savanna and Josephine B), Labit (previously twice parachuted into France), Chenal (lieutenant of the French air force), Peulevé (intelligence agent of Austrian Jewish origin) and Paul Simon (head of the Valmy circuit). On 6 January 1942, they heard a code message broadcast on the BBC French Service, this indicated that the pick up would be that night. Joël and Yves ferried the passengers to Guennoc islet where they all sheltered. Exactly on time, they made contact with the MGB sent to collect them, they were taken aboard and they were in England by dawn.

The Le Tac brothers and Peulevé went back to France in early February 1942 but disaster struck and they were all in German hands within a matter of days. A student at Rennes had been working with a Polish intelligence group that had been betrayed. When he was arrested, the student had on his person a written account of the Overcloud circuit – this led directly to the arrest of de Kergorlay and the entire Le Tac family. The Germans used de Kergorlay and his wireless set to send misinformation to the British, but de Kergorlay omitted his security checks and the British immediately realized that he was a prisoner.

=== Incarceration ===
Joël Le Tac was kept at Fresnes Prison until July 1943 when he was sent to the Struthof camp in Alsace. He was deported as Nacht und Nebel – Night and Fog – a statute that required all prisoners held for more than a few days to be handed over to the Gestapo in whose care they would be executed or transported to Germany while their friends and family would know nothing of their fate. He was kept at Struthof until the advance of Allied troops forced an evacuation in September 1944. Le Tac was sent to Dachau concentration camp, then to Neuengamme and then to Gross-Rosen in Silesia. During the "convoy of death" in January 1945, he was the only survivor of a car for 100 people. He was then sent to Dora where he was put to work in the tunnels and finally to Bergen-Belsen, where he was liberated by the British 15 April 1945.

Joël's mother (Yvonne Le Tac) and his father (André) were arrested in Saint-Pabu; his brother Yves and his brother's wife Andrée were stopped in Paris;. They all survived until they were released at the end of the war in Europe. De Kergorlay was put on trial and sentenced to life imprisonment for cooperating with the enemy – a member of RF's staff who knew this was false managed to get the sentence reduced.

== After the war ==
Le Tac worked as an inspector for a large Anglo-French firm that exported perfumes and fashion, he then worked as the manager of the sales department of a power company in Nancy.

In March 1951 he was recalled to active duty and served as a captain in Indochina. He chose to serve in the Korean War and joined the French Battalion of United Nations forces in January 1952. He served as an intelligence officer and then as commander of the 3rd Company and takes part in the battles of Kumwha, Iron Triangle and T Bone.

In 1953 he started work as freelance journalist for Paris-Presse and Paris Match. He came to specialise in issues relating to radio and television broadcasting.

In 1954 he became Grand Reporter in Paris-Match in 1956 before entering the Paris bureau chief of Time as "North Africa".

In 1956 he was mobilised as a press officer in charge of the expeditionary force landed at Port Said in what became known as the Suez Crisis. He was in the staff of General Massu before going back to Paris-Match in December 1956.

In 1958 he was elected to the National Assembly for Paris's 26th constituency. In 1959, he became general secretary of the Union for the New Republic. He was re-elected repeatedly until 1981, when he was beaten by Bertrand Delanoë with 46.4% of votes, against 53.6% for Delanoë.

In 1981–1983, he was president of the Institut national de l'audiovisuel [INA] – a repository of all French radio and television audiovisual archives. He was president of the International Radio and Television Council of French Expression (CIRTEF). He defended public service broadcasting.

Le Tac kept in touch with his resistance friends and regularly attended reunions of old resisters.

He died on 8 October 2005 at Maisons-Laffitte in the Yvelines.

== Deputy mandates ==
Le Tac was deputy in the National Assembly for Paris's 26th constituency from 30 November 1958 to May 1981, elected for the following parties:

- 30 November 1958 to 9 October 1962: Union for the New Republic
- 25 November 1962 to 2 April 1967: Union for the New Republic-UDT
- 12 March 1967 to 30 May 1968: Democratic Union for the Fifth Republic
- 23 June 1968 to 1 April 1973: Union of Democrats for the Republic
- 2 April 1973 to 2 April 1978: Union of Democrats for the Republic
- 19 March 1978 to 22 May 1981: Rally for the Republic

== Awards and recognition ==
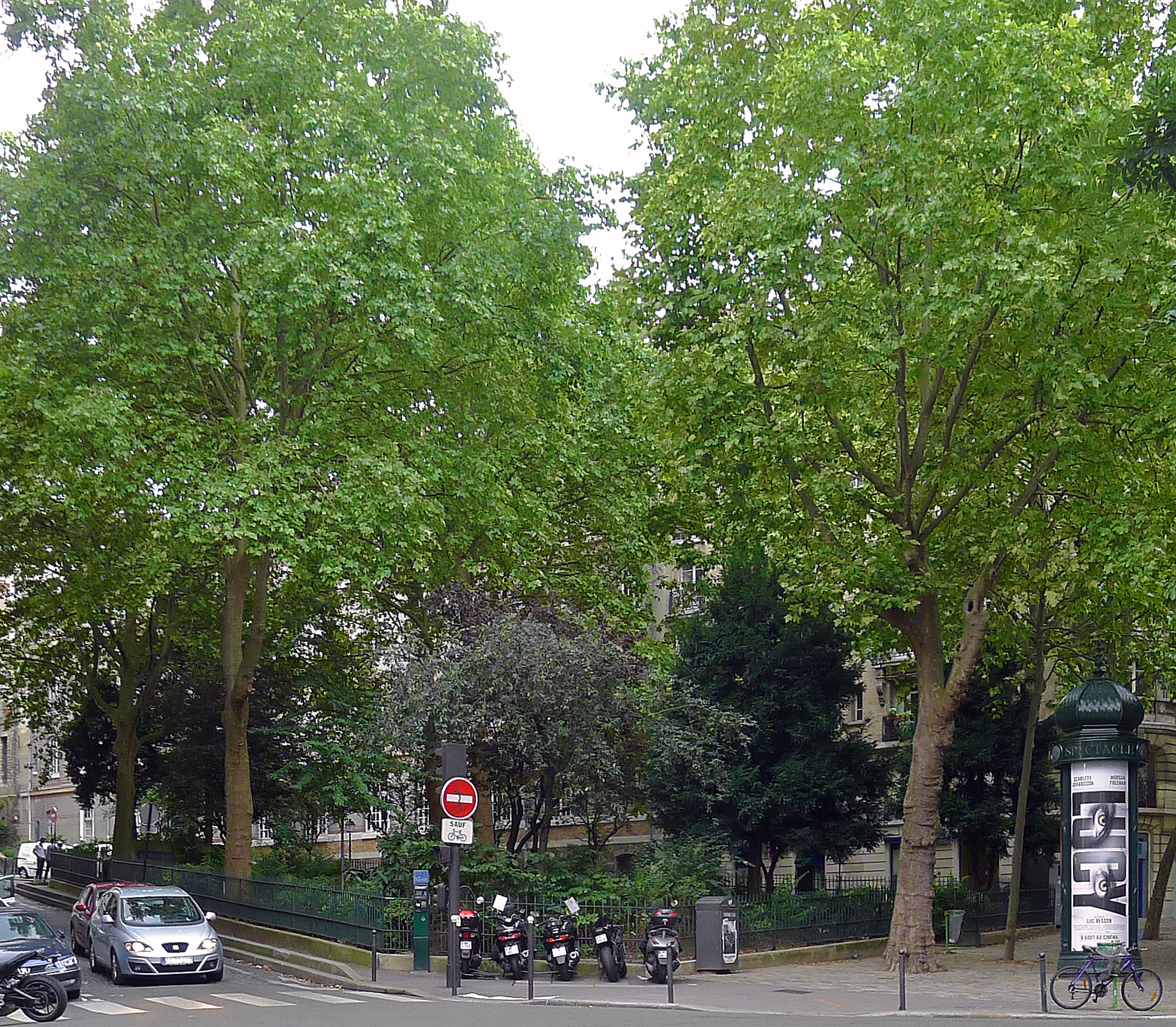
View of Joël-Le Tac Square from Caulaincourt Street.

France
Grand Officer of the Legion of Honour
Companion of the Liberation
Croix de guerre 1939–1945
Resistance Medal with rosette
Volunteers Services Medal in Free France
United Kingdom
Military Medal

Since 2 February 2012, the square located Constantin Pecqueur Place in the 18th arrondissement of Paris is named Square Joël Le Tac.
