= Operation Savanna =

WW2 SOE operation in German-occupied France

- Location: 47.7181°N 2.7628°W
- Planned by: Special Operations Executive
- Objective: Killing German pathfinder pilots.
- Date: 15 March – 5 April 1941
- Executed by: United Kingdom; Free France
- Outcome: Main Allied objective failed
- Location within France

Operation Savanna (or Operation Savannah) (Note: Sources vary, but MRD Foot and the National Archive have the spelling Savanna.) was the first insertion of SOE trained Free French paratroops into German-occupied France during World War II.

This SOE mission, requested by the Air Ministry, was to ambush and kill as many pilots as possible of the Kampfgruppe 100, a German Pathfinder formation stationed at Meucon airfield which spearheaded night raids on Britain.

Setting off from an RAF Whitley on the moonlit night of 15 March 1941, five paratroops made a blind drop at midnight, landing some eight miles east of the town of Vannes (where the Pathfinder crew billeted), and five miles off target. The following day they discovered the pilots no longer commuted between Vannes and Meucon by bus, but had taken to travelling on an ad hoc basis by cars. Hence the grand ambush and assassination had to be aborted.

Seeking to gain something from the mission, Captain Georges Bergé instructed his men to disperse and go on general reconnaissance and meet at Sables d'Olonne at the end of the month for extraction by sea.

One of the men was already missing and another failed to make the rendezvous. After several nights watching from the sand dunes, on 4/5 April, Bergé saw Geoffrey Appleyard of the SOE's Small Scale Raiding Force paddling ashore after launching from the submarine HMS Tigris. The two other kayaks were damaged being launched so only Bergé and Forman could be extracted. Joël Le Tac remained behind and made his way to a safehouse in Paris and continued as an SOE operative.

The Free French paratroops went on to later form the French SAS and Bergé took part in some early raids in the near east, eventually rising to the rank of general.

== See also ==
- Operation Josephine B
