= Army Special Forces (disambiguation) =

The United States Army Special Forces are the foundational branch of the larger elite special operations forces.

Army Special Forces may also refer to:

- Army of the Republic of Vietnam Special Forces, the elite military units of the Army of the Republic of Vietnam
- French Army Special Forces Brigade, the French Army's special forces unit
- People's Liberation Army Special Operations Forces, the sub-branch of the Chinese People's Liberation Army Ground Force that specialises in rapid reaction combat
- Sri Lanka Army Special Forces Regiment, the elite special forces unit of the Sri Lanka Army
