= 1st Marine Infantry Parachute Regiment =

- 1^{er} Régiment de Parachutistes d'Infanterie de Marine
- Regimental beret badge
- Active: September 15, 1940 – present
- Country: France
- Branch: French Army
- Type: Special Forces
- Size: 865 authorized personnel (2017)
- Part of: French Army Special Forces Command
- Garrison/HQ: Bayonne, France
- Mottos: Qui Ose Gagne (Who Dares Wins)
- Anniversaries: Saint-Michel Day
- Engagements: World War II; First Indochina War; Lebanese Civil War; Operation Desert Storm; Operation Enduring Freedom; Opération Licorne; Operation Serval

Commanders
- Current commander: Colonel Cutajar

Insignia
- Identification symbol
- Abbreviation: 1^{er} R.P.I.Ma

The 1st Marine Infantry Parachute Regiment SAS (French: 1^{er} Régiment de Parachutistes d'Infanterie de Marine SAS) or 1^{er} RPIMa SAS is a unit of the French Army Special Forces Command, and therefore part of the Special Operations Command.

Heirs to the Free French paratroopers of the 3rd and 4th squadrons of the Special Air Service (SAS) founded in the United Kingdom during WWII, the 1er RPIMa is sometimes referred to as the "French SAS" and still uses the same motto as their British counterparts to this day: Qui ose gagne (French for "Who Dares Wins").

== Origins ==
Unusually for the French Armed Forces, this unit's affiliations are varied, unrelated, and numerous. The regiment is simultaneously the heir to formations of the French Air Force, mainland infantry, Troupes coloniales, and Troupes de marine.

=== World War II ===
==== 1940 ====
- September 15, 1940, the 1st Air Infantry Company (Free French) (1^{re} Compagnie d'Infanterie de l'Air: 1^{re} CIA) was created in the United Kingdom by Captain Georges Bergé.

==== 1941 ====
- March 15, 1941: Operation Savanna, the first operation of the Special Operations Executive (SOE) in France, an ambush in Brittany.
- On April 10, 1941 the 1^{re} CIA was reattached to the Free French forces and renamed 1^{re} Compagnie Parachutiste (1st Parachute Company).
- May 1941: Operation Josephine B (destruction of 6 transformers at the electric plant in Pessac).
- Divided into one section assigned to the BCRA intelligence unit, and two other sections sent to the Middle East.
- July 21, 1941: embarked for the Middle East, garrisoned in Beirut, then Damascus.
- On September 25, 1941, the 1st Parachute Company became the Peloton Parachutiste du Levant (Parachute Platoon of the Levant) and was attached to the French Air Force.
- On October 15, 1941, the unit's name changed again to the 1^{re} Compagnie de Chasseurs Parachutistes (1^{re} CCP) (1st Parachute Chasseur Company).

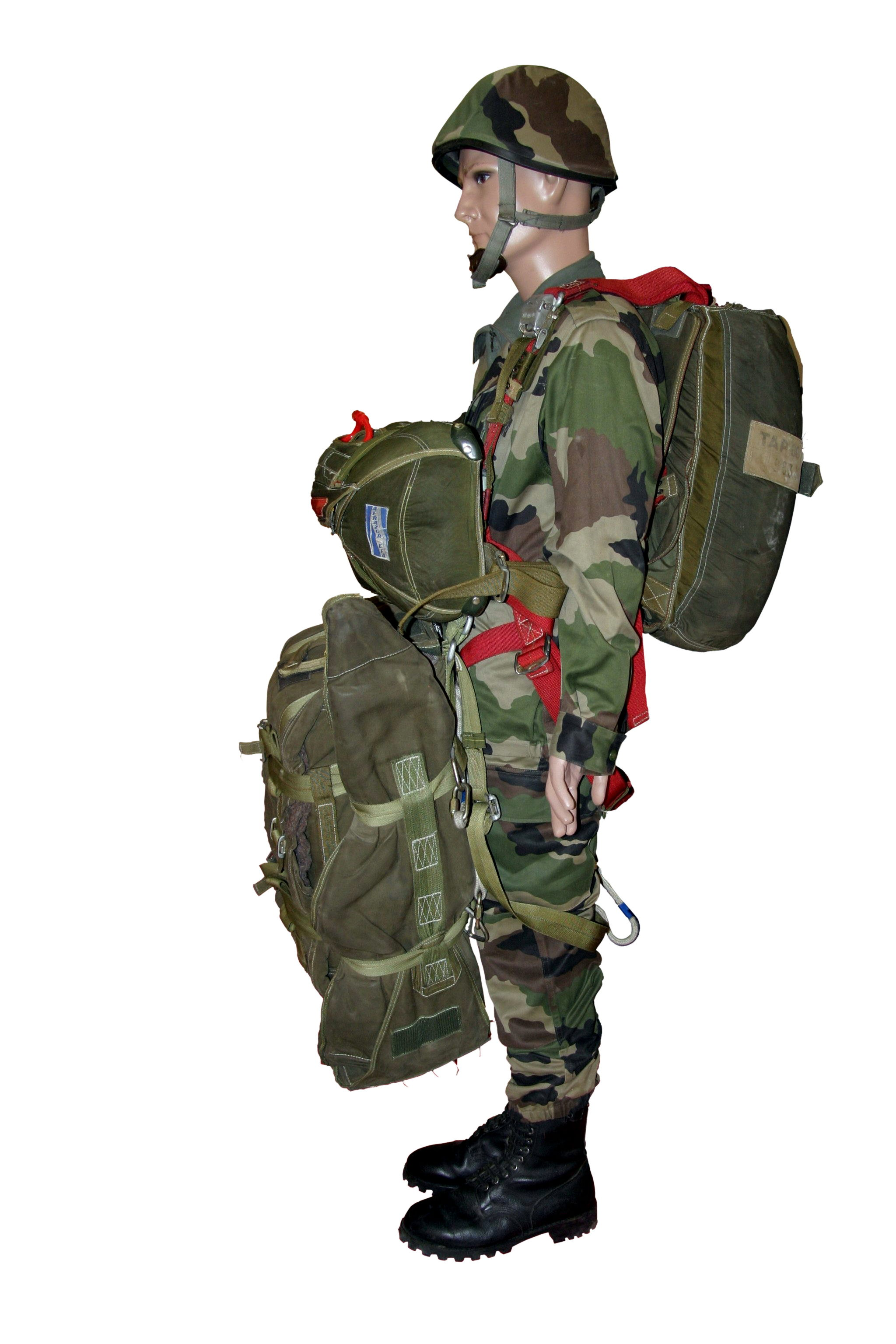
Parachute equipment

==== 1942 ====
- On January 1, 1942, the unit became the French Squadron of the Special Air Service under Major David Stirling, a special forces unit garrisoned at Kibrit Air Base on the Suez Canal.
- June 1942: the French SAS destroyed 20 German aeroplanes in Crete, then attacked the airports in Matouba-Derna, Benina, Barce and Benghazi on the Libyan front.
- July 1942: operations in Cyrenaica.

==== 1943 ====
- January 1943: harassed the German rear-guard in Tunisia.
- Spring 1943: rest and training at Camberley (England).
- On July 1, 1943, the unit became the 1^{er} Bataillon d'Infanterie de l'Air (1^{er} BIA) (1st Air Infantry Battalion).
- In November 1943, the 1st Battalion was renamed 4^{e} Bataillon d'Infanterie de l'Air (4^{e} BIA) (4th Air Infantry Battalion).

==== 1944 ====
- Beginning 1944: training of French SAS in Scotland. The battalion was assigned to the Special Air Service.
- Night of June 5–6: parachuted into Brittany, 36 paratroopers of the FFL in four groups (two over Plumelec, two over Duault). The sole battle casualty in Plumelec (on June 6 at 0 h 40), caporal Emile Bouétard, was probably the first casualty of the Normandy Landing.
- June 1944: combined forces with the French Forces of the Interior (FFI) and the 2nd U.S. Division.
- June 1944: fighting along with the maquis de Saint-Marcel, Morbihan and maquis of Duault in Côtes-d'Armor; a battalion (450 men) parachuted in with the French Forces of the Interior (FFI) 3,000 total, tied up 85,000 Germans in Brittany, preventing them from reaching Normandy, and joined two divisions of George Patton's army on August 6.
- On July 1, 1944 the 4th Battalion was renamed 2^{e} RCP SAS (2nd SAS Parachute Chasseur Regiment) of the 4th SAS Regiment.
- August 1944: operations and SAS participation in the Liberation of Paris.
- September 11, 1944: one company took 3,000 Germans prisoner.
- Autumn: rest leave in Champagne.
- November 11, 1944: the two regiments of the French SAS marched up the Champs-Élysées in Paris before General Charles de Gaulle and British Prime Minister Winston Churchill after the 2^{e} RCP was awarded the Compagnon de la Libération designation (Companion of the Liberation).
- December 23, 1944: provided reinforcement in the Ardennes.

==== 1945 ====
- February 1945: regrouped in England.
- Night of April 7–8, 1945: Operation Amherst, parachuted into the Netherlands. Fighting until the 18th.
- On August 1, 1945, the Parachute Chasseur Regiments merged completely into the French Army. The 3rd Parachute Chasseur Regiment (3^{e} RCP), or 3rd SAS Regiment, was dissolved, and its components were transferred to the 2^{e} RCP.

=== Indochina war ===
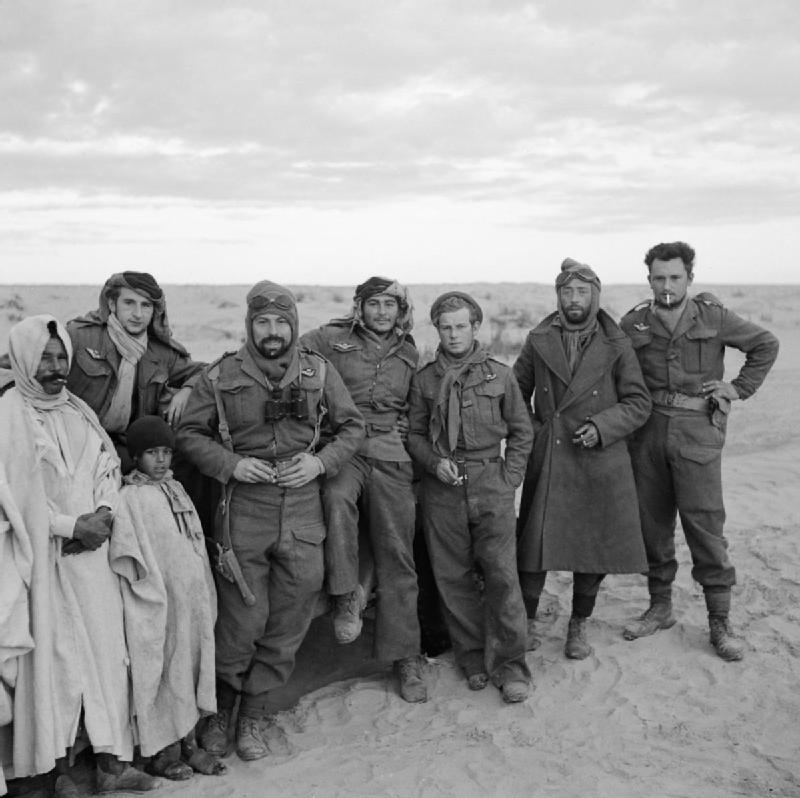
Members of the French Squadron of the SAS (1st Parachute Chasseur Company, 1^{re} Compagnie de Chasseurs Parachutistes, 1^{re} CCP) during the link-up between advanced units of the 1st and 8th Armies in the Gabes-Tozeur area of Tunisia. Previously a Free French paratrooper company, the French SAS were the first of a range of units 'acquired' by Major Stirling as the SAS expanded.

==== Colonial battalions ====
===== 1946 =====
- On February 1, 1946 the 1^{er} Bataillon de Choc S.A.S (1^{er} BC-SAS) (1st SAS Shock Battalion) was created from elements of the 1st Parachute Chasseur Regiment (1^{e} RCP) and the 2nd Parachute Chasseur Regiment (2^{e} RCP).
- On February 23, 1946 the battalion became the 1^{er} Bataillon Parachutiste S.A.S (1^{er} BP-SAS) (1st SAS Parachute Battalion).
- On March 1, 1946, the 2^{e} Bataillon de Choc S.A.S (2^{e} BC-SAS) (2nd SAS Shock Battalion) was created from elements of the 1^{e} RCP and the 1st Shock Parachute Infantry Regiment (1^{e} RICAP).

===== 1947–1948 =====
- On September 25, 1947, the two SAS para battalions regrouped and became the 1^{er} Bataillon Parachutiste SAS (1^{e} BP-SAS) (1st SAS Parachute Battalion).
- On January 1, 1948 the battalion became the 1^{er} Bataillon Colonial de Commandos Parachutistes (1^{e} BCCP) (1st Colonial Parachute Commando Battalion).
- On July 4, 1948, the 1^{e} BCCP was dissolved.

===== 1949–1953 =====
- On December 7, 1949 another 1st Colonial Parachute Commando Battalion (1^{e} BCCP) was created.
- On October 1, 1950, the colonial parachute commandos became the 1^{er} Groupe Colonial de Commandos Parachutistes (1^{e} GCCP) (1st Colonial Parachute Commando Group).
- On March 1, 1951, the parachute commando group became the 1^{er} Bataillon de Parachutiste Coloniaux, (1^{e} BPC) (1st Colonial Parachute Battalion).
- On January 19, 1952 the 1st Colonial Parachute Battalion, (1^{e} BPC) was dissolved.
- On June 20, 1953 another 1st Colonial Parachute Battalion, (1^{er} BPC) was created.

==== Colonial brigades ====
- On July 1, 1946 the 1^{er} Demi-Brigade de Parachutistes SAS (1^{er} DBPSAS) (1st SAS Parachute Demi-Brigade) was created in Indochina from the 1st and 2nd SAS Parachute Battalions.
- On October 1, 1947, the Demi-Brigade Coloniale de Commandos Parachutistes (DBCCP) (Colonial Parachute Commando Demi-Brigade) was created in Brittany.
- On October 23, 1947, the SAS Demi-Brigade became the Demi-Brigade Coloniale de Commandos Parachutistes SAS, DBCCP-SAS (SAS Colonial Parachute Commando Demi-Brigade).
- In June 1948, the two demi-Brigades became: in Brittany, the 1^{e} DBCCP and the 2^{e} DBCCP in Indochina.
- On February 1, 1955: the 1^{e} DBCCP became the Colonial Parachute Brigade (BPC).
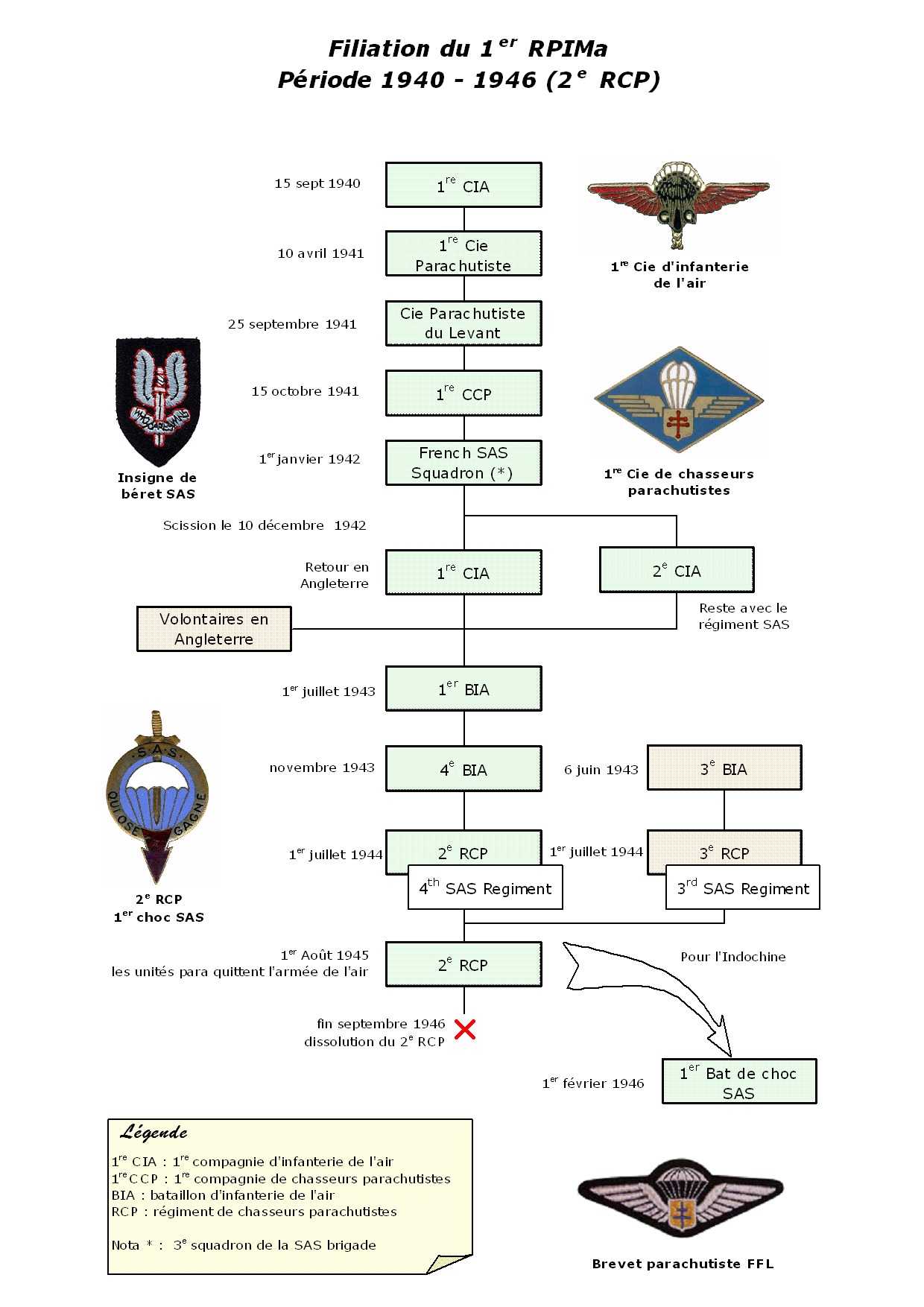
1940 to 1946

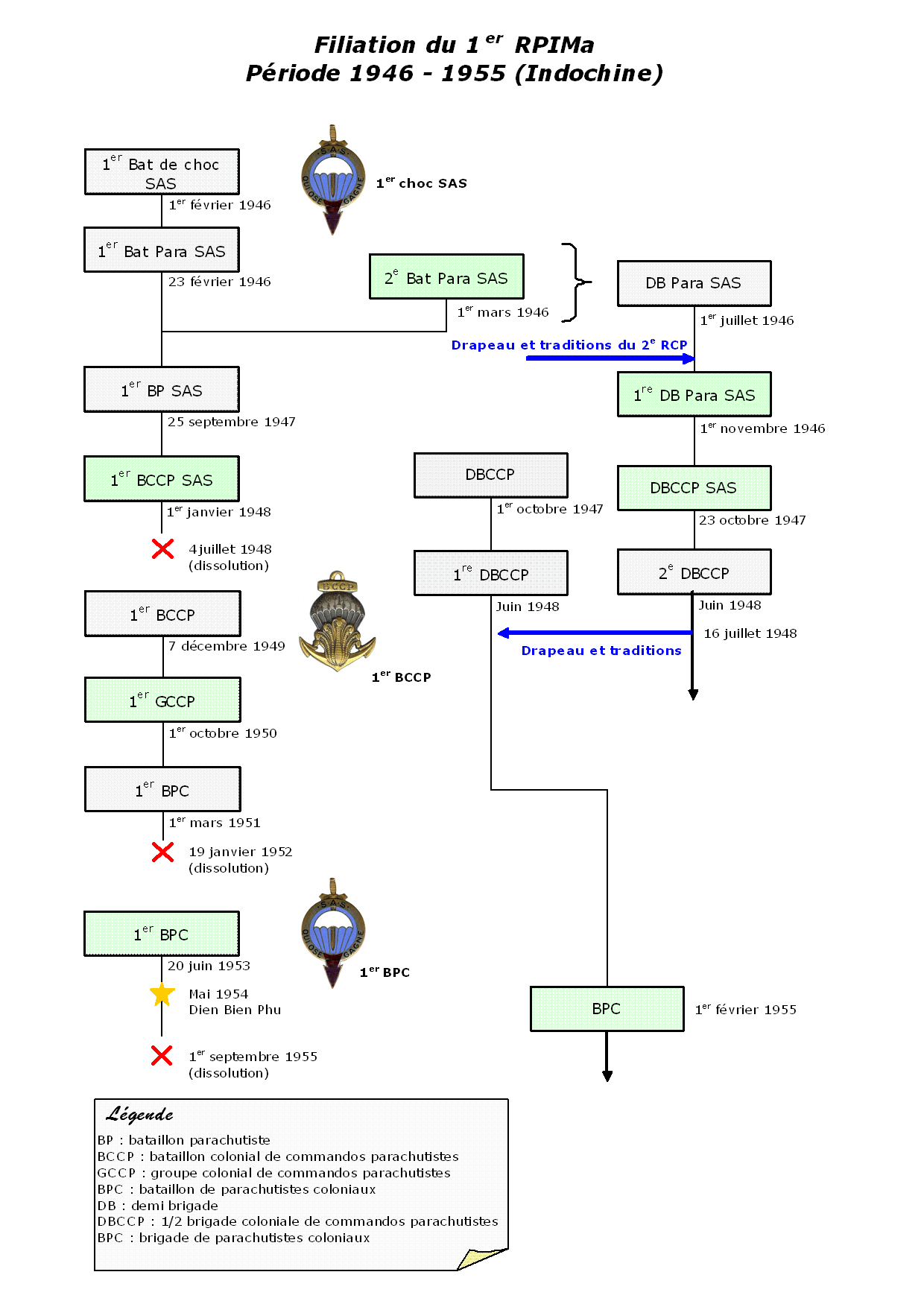
1946 to 1955

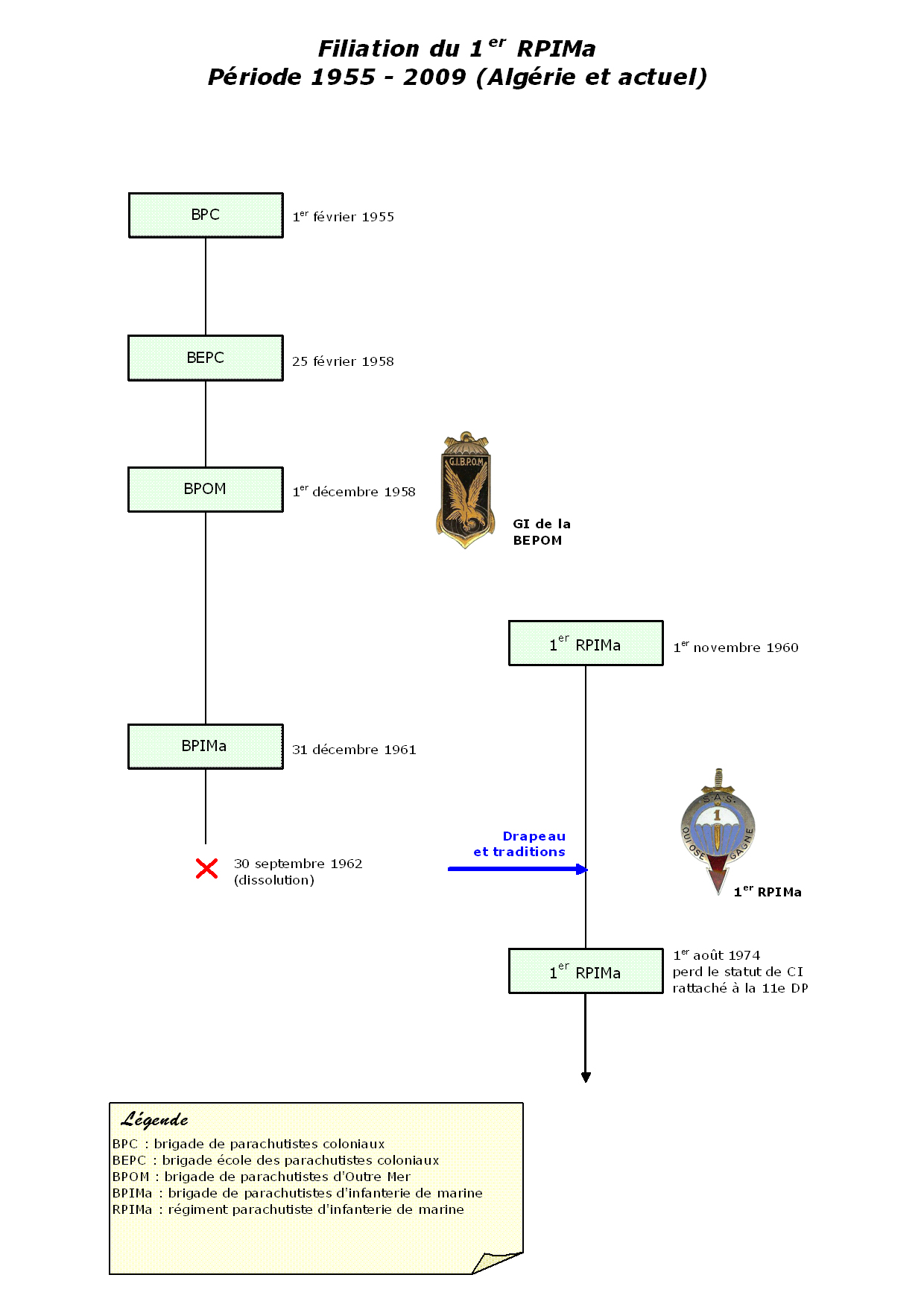
1955 to 2009

=== Post-Indochina ===
The brigade

- On February 25, 1958 the BPC became the Brigade école des Parachutistes Coloniaux, (BEPC) (Colonial Parachute Brigade Instruction Center).
- On December 1, 1958 the BEPC became the Brigade de Parachutistes d'Outre-Mer, (BPOM) (Overseas Parachute Brigade).
- On November 1, 1960 the BPOM became the Brigade Parachutiste d'Infanterie de Marine, BPIMa (Marine Infantry Parachute Brigade).
- On December 31, 1961, the BPIMa was dissolved.

The regiment

- On November 1, 1960, the Centre of Instruction of the 1st Marine Infantry Parachute Regiment was created at Bayonne.
- On January 1, 1973 the 1st Marine Infantry Parachute Regiment (1^{er} RPIMa) was assigned and tasked with special operations.

In 2026 uder decision no. 2026/2826/ARM/EMAT/SCORS/BOTG/NP 1st RPIMa changed ts namne to 1st RPIMa SAS [for Special Air Service]. Announced by President Macron this new name "recognizes the historical link with the Free French SAS paratroopers,".

== History, garrisons, campaigns and battles ==
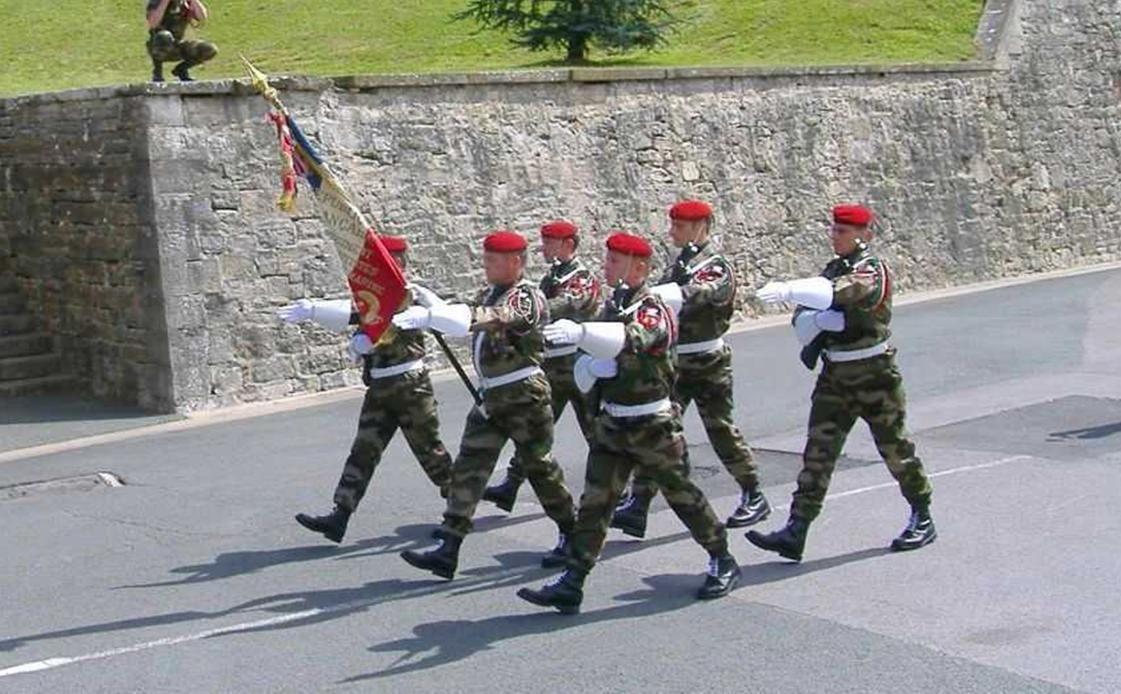
The Regimental Colour Guard of the 1^{er} R.P.I.Ma

Despite its name, the 1^{er} RPIMa is part of the French Army, like other Marine units. Its naval infantry heritage dates back to 1762, when units of the French Army were assigned to the French Navy for ship-borne and overseas duties.

The regiment is the successor to the 1st Colonial Parachute Commando Demi-Brigade, whose origins date back to World War II. Under the command of Captain Georges Bergé, the 1st Air Company was formed in England on 15 September 1940, incorporating parachute units of the Special Air Service (SAS). The 1^{re} CCP/SAS was established in Scotland in 1941. Between 1942 and 1944, the company operated in Crete, Libya, Tunisia, Brittany, Belgium and the Netherlands.

The company was subsequently disbanded and reconstituted under a series of designations. It became an SAS Parachute Demi-Brigade from 1946 to 1949, followed by the 1st Colonial Parachute Commando Demi-Brigade, which served in Indochina from 1949 to 1955. It was redesignated as a BPC in Algeria from 1955 to 1958. The BCCP was disbanded and reconstituted as the GIBPOM in 1959, before becoming the B.P.C.I.Ma in 1960. In 1962, it was redesignated the 1^{er} RPIMa, retaining the SAS emblem.

=== Successive garrisons ===
- September 1940: RAF Ringway, England
- 1941: Beirut, followed by Damascus
- 1942: Kabrit, on the Suez Canal
- 1943: Camberley, United Kingdom
- After the war: various locations in France
- 1960: Establishment of the 1^{er} RPIMa, based at Bayonne

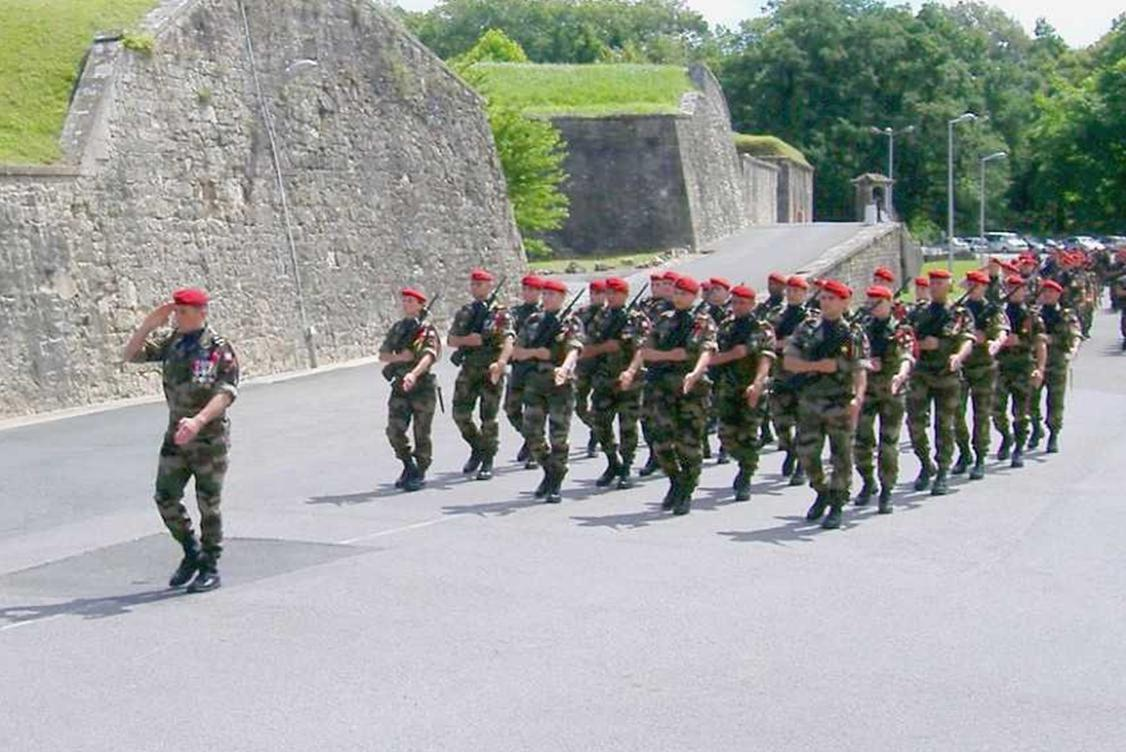
Companies of the 1^{er} RPIMa on parade.

=== World War II ===
The 1^{er} RPIMa inherited the traditions of the two Free French Special Air Service (SAS) regiments, which served with distinction alongside the British SAS Brigade during World War II.

On 15 September 1940, General Charles de Gaulle signed the order establishing the 1^{ère} Compagnie d'Infanterie de l'Air (1^{re} CIA), or 1st Free French Airborne Infantry Company, as part of the Free French Forces, under the command of Captain Bergé.

The 1^{re} CIA began operational missions in March 1941, parachuting into occupied France. The company was subsequently divided into two units: a covert action unit responsible for clandestine operations, and a conventional, uniformed company sent to North Africa in September 1941 to fight the Axis Powers alongside British forces.

Captain Bergé quickly established a close relationship with Major David Stirling, commander of the newly formed Special Air Service (SAS). The French detachment was soon incorporated into the SAS as the French Squadron. Between 1942 and 1943, the French SAS operated across the region, including in Crete, targeting Axis forces and destroying aircraft and supply dumps. In November 1943, the 3rd and 4th Air Infantry Battalions were formed and incorporated into the SAS Brigade alongside their British and Belgian counterparts, the 1st and 2nd SAS Regiments.

The Free French SAS played a significant role in the liberation of Europe. In Brittany, shortly after midnight on D-Day, 6 June 1944, Caporal Émile Bouétard (born in Brittany in 1915) became the first Allied soldier killed in action in the area, at Plumelec, Morbihan. On 1 August 1944, the 3rd and 4th Air Infantry Battalions were redesignated the 2nd and 3rd Chasseur Parachute Battalions. In recognition of their bravery, King George VI granted the Free French SAS permission to wear the red beret of the British SAS, replacing the black beret previously worn. As the war drew to a close, 52 French SAS 'sticks' (705 men) were parachuted into the Netherlands on 7 April 1945, causing considerable disruption behind German lines and easing pressure on the advance of the 2nd Canadian Army Corps.

The Free French SAS played a major role in SAS operations in Africa, France, Belgium, the Netherlands and Germany, earning numerous French and foreign decorations, including British DSOs, MCs and MMs. The regimental colours of the 1^{er} RPIMa have also been awarded the United States Bronze Star Medal, the Dutch Bronze Cross and the Belgian Croix de Guerre. Its SAS heritage remains evident in the regimental motto, Qui Ose Gagne ('Who Dares Wins'), and in the award of the RAPAS Wings. These are reminiscent of the wartime SAS Operational Wings and are awarded to 1^{er} RPIMa operators only after they have met stringent selection requirements, including operational deployments.

=== 1945–1974 ===
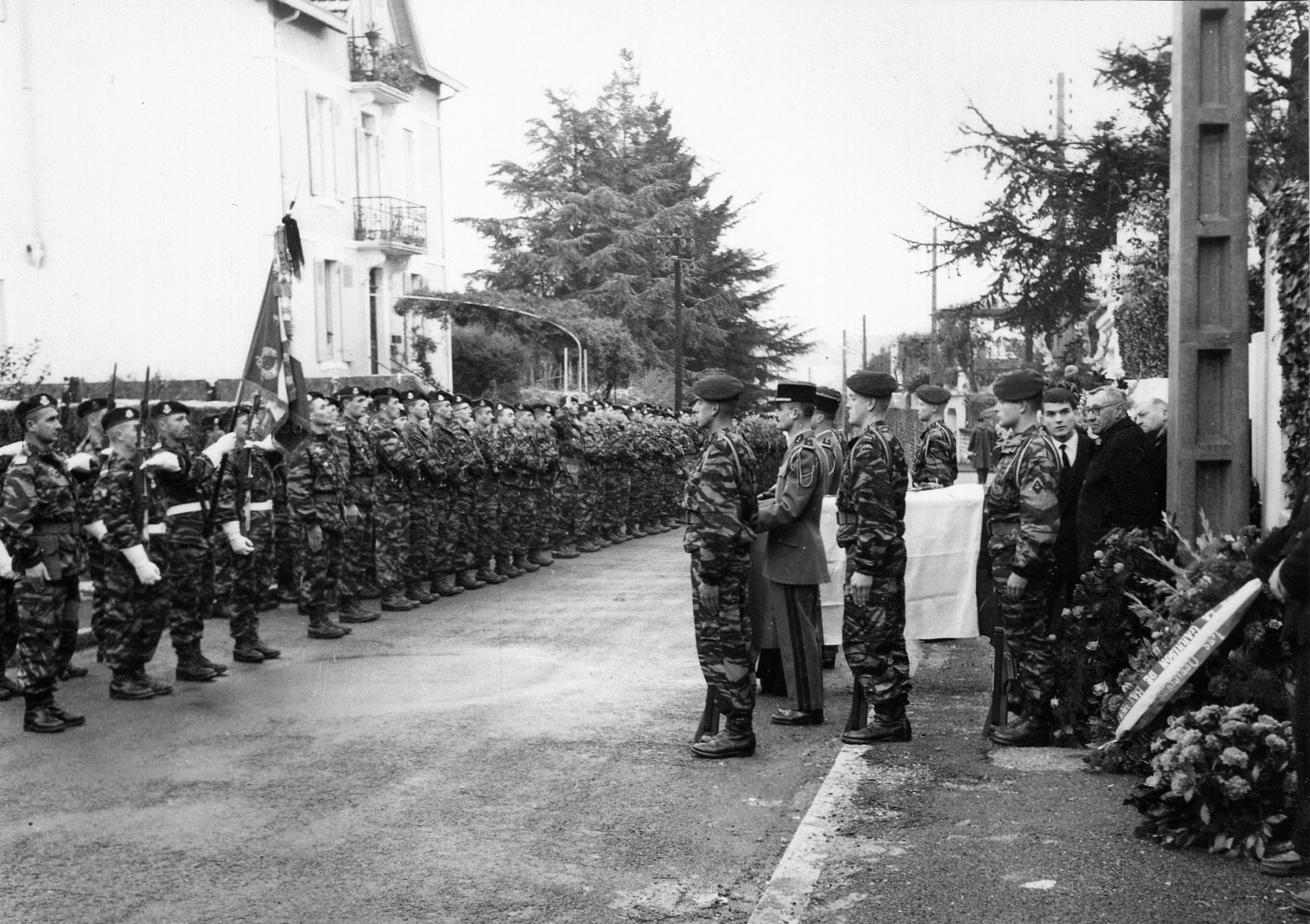
1^{er} RPIMa in Bayonne, 1962

Between 1945 and 1954, the unit that would eventually become the 1^{er} RPIMa, following several changes of designation, took part in the First Indochina War. During the conflict, it participated in some of the more than 160 combat parachute jumps carried out by French paratroopers. After the war, the unit underwent further organisational changes and became a training depot for the colonial airborne forces. It did not, therefore, participate in the Algerian War.

The 1^{er} RPIMa was established in 1960 and continued in a training role until 1974, when it was reorganised as a special forces unit, a role it retains today.

=== 1974–2006 ===
The regiment's principal mission during this period was to support French interests in Africa. Between 1974 and 1981, it underwent a further change of role, focusing on long-range reconnaissance patrols for almost a decade, while continuing to use its training expertise to support and train friendly forces overseas.

During the 1980s and 1990s, the regiment deployed on numerous occasions to areas of conflict around the world. During Operation Desert Storm, the 1^{er} RPIMa lost two personnel in Iraq in 1991.

In 1992, the establishment of the French Special Operations Command (Commandement des Opérations Spéciales, COS) prompted a major reorganisation of French special forces, incorporating lessons learned from the First Gulf War. As part of this process, the nucleus of the army's BFST (Brigade des Forces Spéciales Terre, or Land Special Forces Brigade) was established in 1997, with the 1^{er} RPIMa as its core unit. Throughout this period, the regiment also participated in operations in the Balkans and Africa. In Bosnia, it was specifically involved in tracking down war criminals, contributing to several successful arrests of individuals indicted for war crimes.

== Current deployment ==
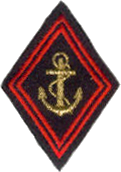
Shoulder insignia

The 1^{er} RPIMa is a modern, highly skilled, and experienced Special Forces unit organised along company lines and part of the French Army Special Forces Command (COM FST). The main strength of the regiment lies in its three RAPAS companies (RAPAS meaning Airborne Reconnaissance and Special Action), each specialised in a specific field such as HAHO/HALO, Counter-Terrorism, amphibious, jungle, mountain or motorised patrol operations and its RAPAS Signal company dedicated to C3 (Command, Control and Communications) support for Special Operations.

The 1^{er} RPIMa also fields a Training and Operations company tasked with providing selection, basic, and continuation training for the unit's manpower, and a logistics company that supports the regiment in its daily and operational missions. Inspired by the British Special Air Service, the unit still shares much with it, including missions and capabilities.

=== Unit specialisation ===
- CTLO (Counter-terrorism and hostage rescue teams)
- GDC (Garde du Corps)
- THP/TELD (Tireurs Haute Précision / Tireur d'élite longue distance, snipers)
- SCO (Paratrooper – SAS Chuteurs Opérationnels)
- PAT SAS (motorised patrols. Patrouilles SAS)
- SPO (SAS Plongeurs Offensifs, offensive divers)
- Mountain, arctic, desert, and jungle warfare
- Explosives and demolitions

== Organisation and structure ==
Because of its long history with the British Special Air Service, much of the 1^{er} RPIMA core is based on the British SAS. Each company specialises in a particular area.

- Four main RAPAS (Airborne Reconnaissance and Special Action) combat companies:
  - 1^{re} Compagnie: Paratroopers, HAHO HALO, counter-terrorism, and bodyguards
  - 2^{e} Compagnie: Mountain, Arctic, desert and jungle warfare
  - 3^{e} Compagnie: Motorized patrols
  - 4^{e} Compagnie: Counter terrorism, hostage rescue, and reconnaissance in urban areas

There is also a command and logistics company and a training and operations company, which handle recruiting and initial and ongoing training.

Each company is split into RAPAS sections. Each section includes 30 men.

The 1^{er} RPIMa is based in Bayonne, which enables amphibious and mountain training. This location is also ideal due to its proximity to the Centre d'Entraînement Adapté (CTA), Europe's largest and most modern Close Quarters Battle (CQB) facility and to the dedicated assets of the French Army's Special Forces Aviation Detachment (DAOS) and airborne school (ETAP), both establishments that are essential to its training and operations.

== Weapons and equipment ==
The 1^{er} RPIMa's main weapon is the HK416A5 5.56x45mm assault rifle. Besides this, SIG 550, M4 and FN SCAR assault rifles are also used by French Army Special Forces. Sometimes M203 or HK69 grenade launchers are also used. For CQB, the MP5 series and FN P90 are the main weapons; the 10.4-inch version of the HK416 is also sometimes used. The Glock 17 and H&K USP are the standard sidearms carried by the soldiers. The ARWEN 37 mm grenade launcher is used in CQB work to launch CS gas into buildings. The Benelli M4 shotgun is also used in CQB to breach doors. FN Minimi is used as light machine gun, 5.56mm and 7.62mm, and snipers use the HK417 or Hecate II rifles. Sometimes MILAN missiles have been used in combat to provide fire support.

They wear standard French camouflage and webbing, except during CT/HR/CQB operations. CQB kit includes a black balaclava, black Nomex coveralls, non-slip boots, special webbing and holsters, a medical kit for team medics, gas masks, and special communications equipment.

The VPS Panhard VPS (Véhicule Patrouille SAS), based on the Mercedes-Benz 270 CDI G-Class 4x4 light tactical vehicle, is used by French Army Special Forces. It is a rapidly deployable vehicle capable of long-duration missions in extreme climates. An armoured floor provides the crew with anti-landmine protection, and the VPS is air transportable by C-160 Transall or C-130 Hercules. In the French Army, the VPS has a 360° ring mount over the rear body, armed with a Browning 12.7mm heavy machine gun or Gatling machine gun. Another 7.62mm machine gun is mounted on a swivel station at the front of the crew compartment and operated by the vehicle commander.

== Skills ==
The 1^{er} RPIMa performs several roles. These include bodyguard duty for VIPs in conflict areas, direct action, reconnaissance, sabotage, unconventional warfare, and hostage rescue. While their name states they are Marine Infantry, they are in fact Army.

The 1^{er} RPIMa relies on several skills to successfully carry out its missions. Most skills are either regiment- or brigade-specific and need constant honing to maintain the desired level of proficiency. They can be divided into several generic fields:

- The RAPAS (Airborne Reconnaissance and Special Action) basic skills
  - RAPAS skill training is given to enlisted men and NCOs after they have completed a series of organic and basic regimental courses
  - Basic training leading to the first rung of the RAPAS ladder is the elementary RAPAS technical certificate, which takes six months to earn.
  - RAPAS training covers all the basics of special forces functions and is complemented by specific courses (marking out drop zones (DZ) and landing zone (LZ), basic and advanced close quarters combat, sniping...)
  - A RAPAS group is led by a senior non-commissioned officer or a lieutenant. NCOs are generally former enlisted men who rose from the ranks of the regiment, while officers come from various specialised schools (mostly Infantry, Armour and Engineer) before following a specific course complemented by on-the-job training.
  - When fully qualified and operational, a RAPAS team member reaches the rank of Caporal-chef (Master Corporal), has been in the regiment for five years and spent more than two-thirds of that taking classes, and has been deployed in real-world operations, probably once a year.
- Air insertion
  - Parachute operations: each member of the regiment is static-line parachute qualified using some specific low-altitude (125 meters) dropping techniques. The 1er RPIMa can also field different teams proficient in both HAHO and HALO techniques. Each company has HALO capability.
  - Helicopter operations: Fast-roping and helicopter rappelling, special purpose infiltration and extraction rigs, LZ marking, special operation procedures, helicopter fire support, helicopter-borne sniper support, light helicopter insertion and extraction
  - Air delivery: the 1^{er} RPIMa is unique in the way it has integrated an air delivery component with teams able to rig and airdrop light to heavy loads and pallets in support of special operations from cargo aircraft of the dedicated special operations division of the French air force.
- Amphibious operations
  - Open circuit breathing apparatus: the 1^{er} RPIMa can field a complete open-circuit (SCUBA) team for beach recce or riverine operations using light crafts, including kayaks
  - Closed-circuit breathing apparatus: the 1^{er} RPIMa can field a complete closed-circuit team for covert underwater missions. This team is not a combat diver team; it uses waterways as another infiltration method.
- Motorised operations
  - True to their SAS ancestors, the 1^{er} RPIMa has always maintained a motorized patrol capability. It currently centres on PATSAS patrols that are tasked with developing and refining the methods and equipment needed for such operations. In addition to the PATSAS, each RAPAS company fields several motorised RAPAS groups. The mounts of motorised patrols are modified Peugeot P4s, Mercedes VPS and ACMAT VLRA trucks, all fitted with machine guns, automatic cannons, mortars, AGLs or ATGWs.
  - The Special Recce Patrols (PRS): Having understood with time and experience that it is always better to act on intelligence which had been gathered and analysed by operators that intimately know which method of operation would be best used by the action groups, the 1^{er} RPIMa has decided to include in its specialised teams the PRS concept. The PRS are infiltrated ahead of the action teams and provide real-time intelligence on the target area. The PRS then transmit the information gathered by a variety of secure means to the command level, which disseminates it to the action groups.
- Counter Terrorism
  - The 1^{er} RPIMa can field several CT teams, all backed by specialised sniper teams proficient in calibres ranging from 5.56 mm to 12.7 mm (.50 cal)
  - All ranks of the company are CT trained
  - The Regiment benefits from proximity to the Centre d'Entraînement Adapté (CTA), Europe's largest and most modern CQB facility (CQB = Close Quarters Battle or Killing House). The CTA is located in Pau and offers unmatched live-firing capabilities for all sorts of CT scenarios.
  - The CTA keeps CQB skills honed through regular training and cross-training with French and Allied CT units.
- Bodyguard teams
  - The 1^{er} RPIMa has been involved in bodyguard duties for the last 25 years.
  - The Regiment only provides Bodyguard teams to high-ranking officials at theatre level.
  - A fully qualified RAPAS team member is also Bodyguard qualified
- Jungle, desert and mountain operations
  - So as to prepare RAPAS units of the 1er RPIMa for operations over difficult terrain, it can use French and foreign training centres around the world
  - Mountain, jungle and desert training exercises are scheduled every year
  - RAPAS team members are sent regularly as permanent instructors to jungle and desert schools in French Guiana or friendly African countries
  - Every year, the Regiment sends some of its members to foreign schools to improve its tactics and procedures in hostile environments (jungle, bush...)
  - A regular influx of experienced NCOs volunteering from the French 27th Mountain Infantry Brigade keeps the Regiment up-to-date on modern mountaineering techniques

== Selection and training ==
Officers and NCOs joining the regiment have to attend the same selection and training as enlisted personnel.

Enlisted soldiers in the French Army can try to join super RPIMA between their first and third years of active duty.

The first step is profile selection: Candidates are selected based on unit requirements and their personal file (e.g., if the regiment needs mountain specialists, it will ask more mountain troopers to attend selection). Selected candidates must attend two weeks of basic airborne training before SF training, unless they are already enlisted in an airborne regiment.

The second step of selection is "adaptation training" and "stage commando", lasting twelve weeks. Candidates must be above average to continue the training. Most failures and RTUs occur during this phase.

The last step of selection is the "stage CTE RAPAS" lasting six months. After completion of this "stage", candidates are fully assigned to the regiment as a special forces soldier. They will attend additional training to become specialists (bodyguards, pathfinders, etc.)

== Traditions ==
=== Anniversary of the Troupes de Marine ===
The anniversary is celebrated on the day of the Battle of Bazeilles, a village which was taken and abandoned four consecutive times under orders, on September 1, 1870.

Et au Nom de Dieu, vive la coloniale !

In the Name of God, long live the colonial !

This war-calling concludes intimate ceremonies which part life in the regiments. Often also originated as an act of grace to Charles de Foucauld.

=== Patron Saint ===
Saint-Michael: As a paratrooper regiment, the 1^{er} RPIMa celebrates each year on September 29, the Patron-Saint of Paratroopers. This celebration includes various events with veterans.

=== Motto ===
Who Dares Wins is the general motto of the British SAS, translated in French to Qui Ose Gagne.

=== Insignia ===
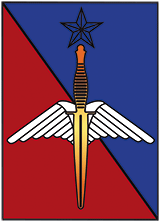
Insignia French Army Special Forces Brigade
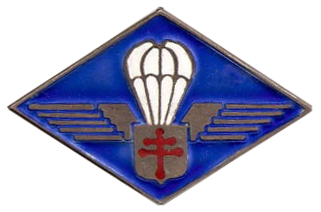
Insignia of the 1st Parachute Chasseur Company 1^{er} C.C.P

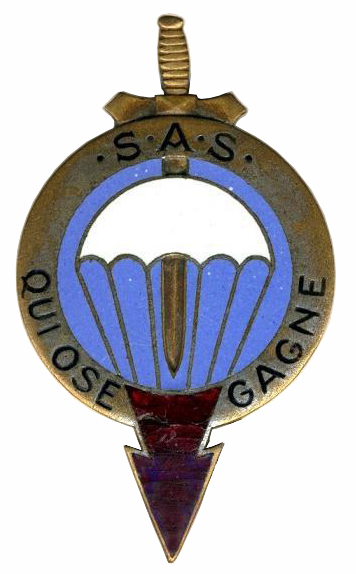
Insignia of the
2^{e} R.C.P, 1^{e} B.C.C.P S.A.S, 1^{e} B.P.C

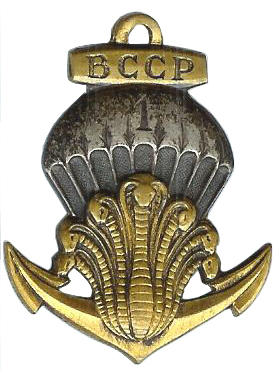
Insignia of the 1^{e} B.C.C.P

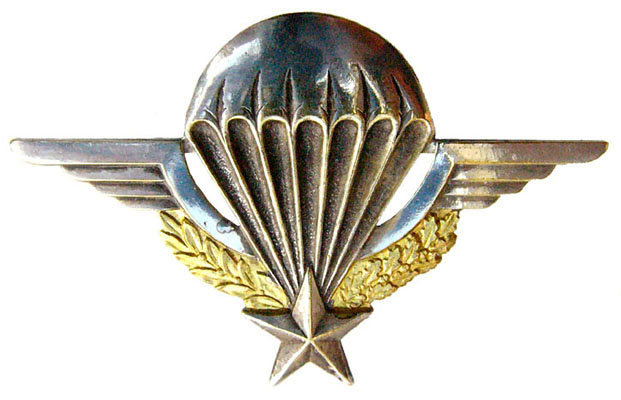
Parachute Brevet

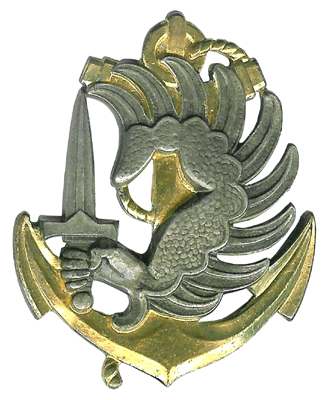
Beret insignia of para T.D.M

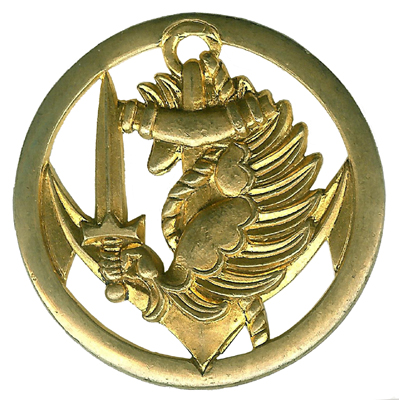
Previous beret insignia of para T.D.M

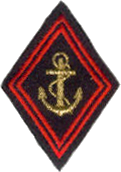
Shoulder Insignia

=== Regimental Colors ===
The unit is the only parachute regiment of the Marines to wear Maroon berets as opposed to the standard red beret of other units.

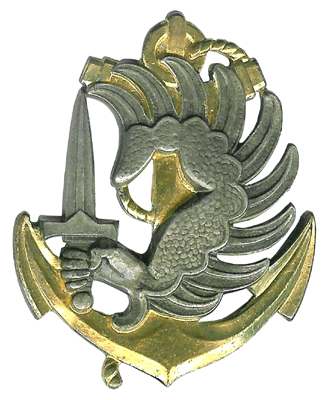

Regimental Colors of the 1^{e}R.P.I.Ma

=== Honors ===
==== Battle honours ====
The list of operations shows a worldwide commitment since it ranges from Afghanistan to Africa and the Balkans.

- Crete 1942
- Libye 1942
- Sud Tunisien 1943
- France 1944
- Ardennes Belges 1945
- Hollande 1945
- Indochine 1946-1954
- Koweït 1990–1991
- 2011 Libyan civil war

=== Decorations ===
The most decorated French and allied unit of the Second World War

- Croix de la Légion d'honneur.
- Ordre de la Libération as heir to the 2nd Parachute Chasseur Regiment of the Air Force, the regiment bears the decoration bestowed on November 11, 1944 by général Charles de Gaulle, under the Arc de Triomphe at Paris to the 2nd Parachute Chasseur Regiment 2^{e} R.C.P of the Air Force.
- Croix de guerre 1939-1945 with 6 palms.
- Croix de guerre des Théâtres d'opérations extérieurs (T.O.E) with 3 palms.
- Croix de la Valeur militaire avec 3 palms.
- Bronze Lion.

The officers and members of this regiment wear one of four Fourragères:

- The Fourragère bearing colors of the Légion d'Honneur 1^{re} Brigade de Parachutistes Coloniaux
- The fourragère bearing the colours of the Croix des T.O.E
- The fourragère bearing the colours of the Valeur Militaire
- The fourragere bearing colors of the Croix de la libération (since June 18, 1996). ( that of the 2^{e} R.C.P).
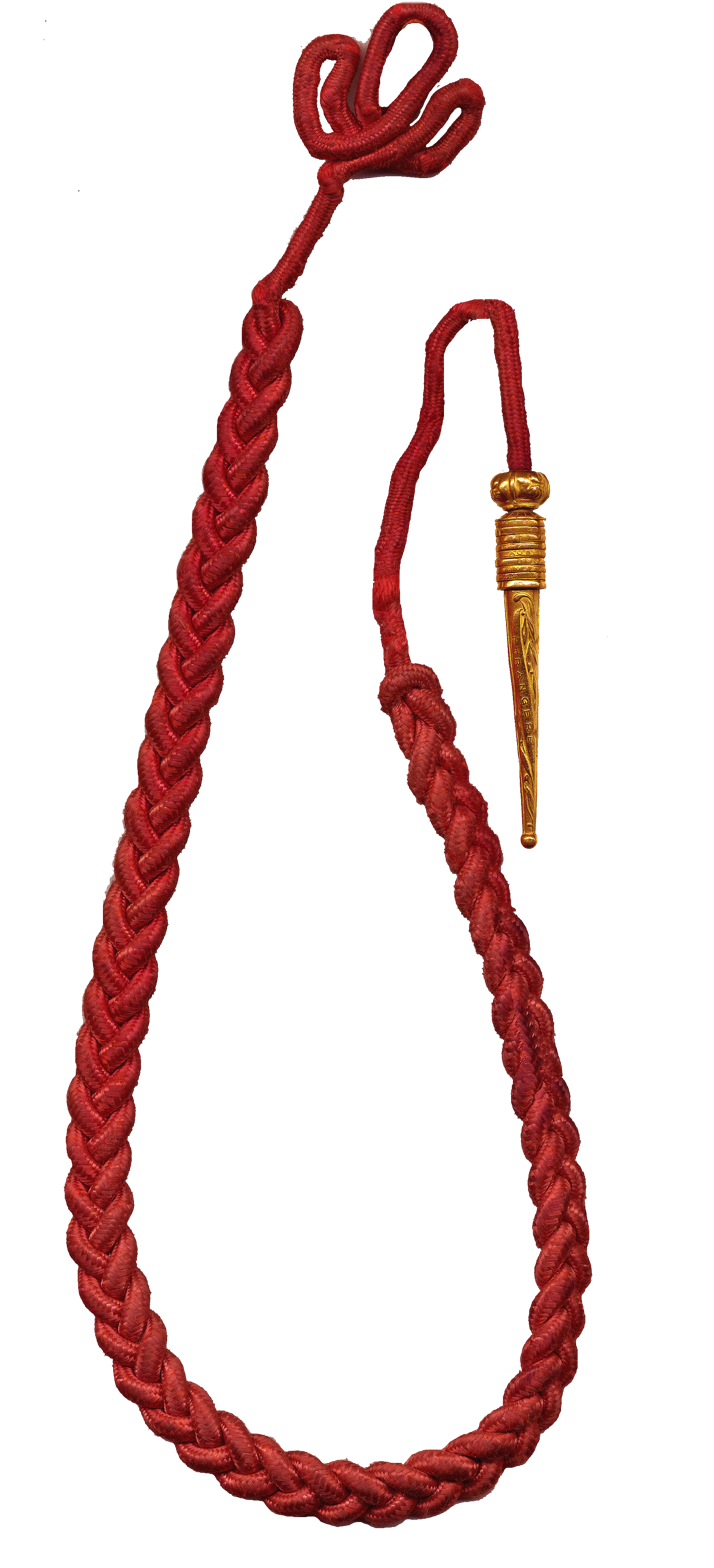
Fourragère bearing colors of the légion d'honneur

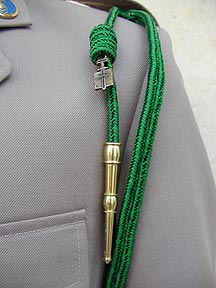
Fourragère bearing of the Ordre de la Libération

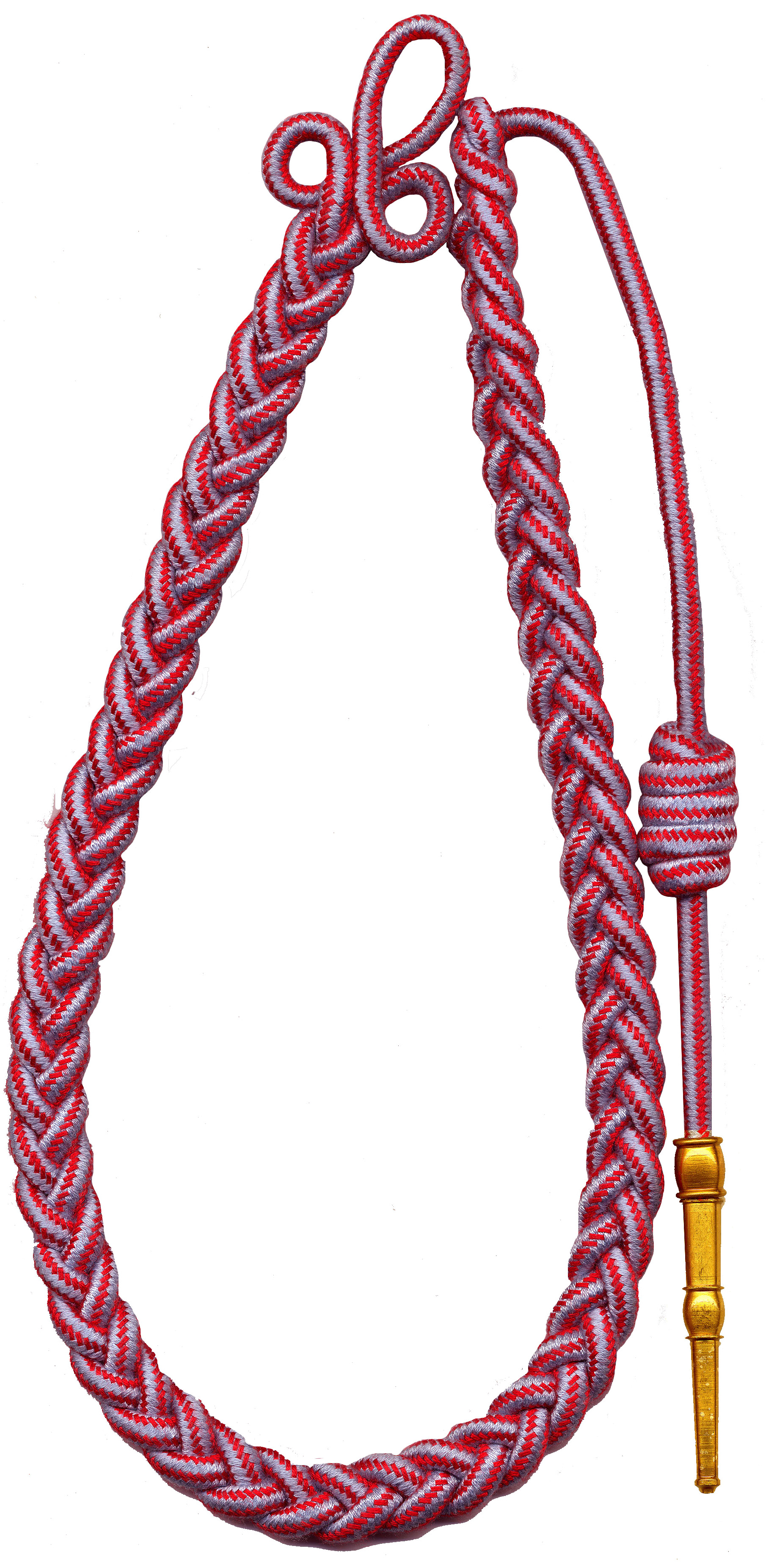
Fourragère bearing colors of the Croix de guerre des T.O.E

== Regimental Commanders ==
=== World War 2 ===
- 1940–1942 Capitaine Bergé (1^{re} CIA / 1^{re} CCP)
- 1942–1943 Capitaine Lambert (1^{re} CIA)
- 1942–1943 Capitaine Jordan (2^{e} CIA)
- 1943–1943 Lieutenant-colonel Fourcault (1^{er} BIA)
- 1943–1944 Commandant Bourgouin (4^{e} BIA)
- 1944–1944 Lieutenant-colonel Bourgoin
- 1944–1945 Commandant Puech-Samson
- 1945–1945 Lieutenant-colonel Jacques Pâris de Bollardière
- 1945–1946 Lieutenant-colonel Reyniers

=== Indochina ===
- 1946 Lieutenant-colonel Jacques Pâris de Bollardière
- 1947–1949 Colonel Jacques Massu
- 1949–1951 Colonel Jean Gilles
- 1951–1953 Lieutenant-colonel Pierre Langlais
- 1953–1954 Lieutenant-colonel Fritsch
- 1954–1955 Lieutenant-colonel Fourcade
- 1946–1947 Chef d'escadron Mollat
- 1947–1948 Capitaine Ducasse
- 1946–1947 Commandant de Maurepas
- 1949–1950 Chef de bataillon Portal
- 1950–1951 Chef de bataillon Dubois
- 1951–1951 Chef de bataillon Fourcade
- 1951–1952 Capitaine Moretti
- 1953–1954 Chef de bataillon Souquet
- 1954–1954 Capitaine Penduff
- 1954–1954 Capitaine Bazin de Bezons
- 1954–1954 Capitaine Cogno Bourdieu
- 1954–1954 Chef de bataillon Charlet
- 1954–1955 Chef de bataillon Moniez
- 1954–1954 Capitaine Ferrano

=== Algeria War ===
- 1955 Colonel Gracieux
- 1957 Lieutenant-colonel Pierre Château-Jobert
- 1958 Lieutenant-colonel Pierre Château-Jobert
- 1958 Lieutenant-colonel Fossey-François
- 1958 Colonel Fourcade
- 1960–1961 Colonel Lemire
- 1961–1961 Colonel Cabestan
- 1960–1962 Colonel Moulié

=== From 1962 ===
- 1962–1965 colonel Florentin
- 1965–1967 colonel Mantes
- 1967–1970 colonel de Braquilanges
- 1970–1972 colonel Dorandeu
- 1972–1974 colonel Hovette
- 1974–1976 colonel Jouslin de Noray
- 1976–1978 colonel Franceschi
- 1978–1980 colonel Briançon-Rouge
- 1980–1982 lieutenant colonel Norlain
- 1982–1984 colonel Messana
- 1984–1986 colonel Huchon
- 1986–1988 colonel Landrin
- 1988–1990 colonel Rigot
- 1990–1992 colonel Rosier
- 1992–1994 colonel Tauzin
- 1994–1996 colonel Cherreau
- 1996–1998 colonel Stoltz
- 1998–2000 colonel Nebout
- 2000–2002 colonel de Turckheim
- 2002–2004 colonel Rastouil
- 2004–2006 colonel Grégoire de Saint-Quentin
- 2006–2008 colonel Harivongs
- 2008–2010 colonel Vidaud
- 2010–2012 colonel Baratz
- 2012–2014 colonel Laurentin
- 2014–2016 colonel Michel Delpit
- 2016–2018 colonel Bos
- 2018–2020 colonel Cutajar
- 2020–2022 colonel de Monicault
- 2022–2024 colonel Foudriat
- 2024–present colonel Lavisse

== See also ==
- List of French paratrooper units
- 1st Parachute Chasseur Regiment
- Long Range Desert Group
