= Madge Addy =

Marguerite Nuttall Addy OBE (16 February 1904 – 1970), also known under her married names Lightfoot, Holst and Hansen, was a British woman who worked as a nurse during the Spanish Civil War and as a spy during World War II.

== Early life ==
She was born, one of five children, in Rusholme, Manchester. In 1930 she married Arthur W Lightfoot in Manchester and is believed to have worked in a hairdressing business in the Chorlton area. She was also a registered nurse.

In 1937 she arrived in Spain during the Spanish Civil War and worked with the International Brigade as head nurse in a monastery near Uclés in Castile. At the end of the war in 1939 she was rounded up as a foreigner and imprisoned, but eventually allowed to leave after a petition by the English government.

== Second World War ==
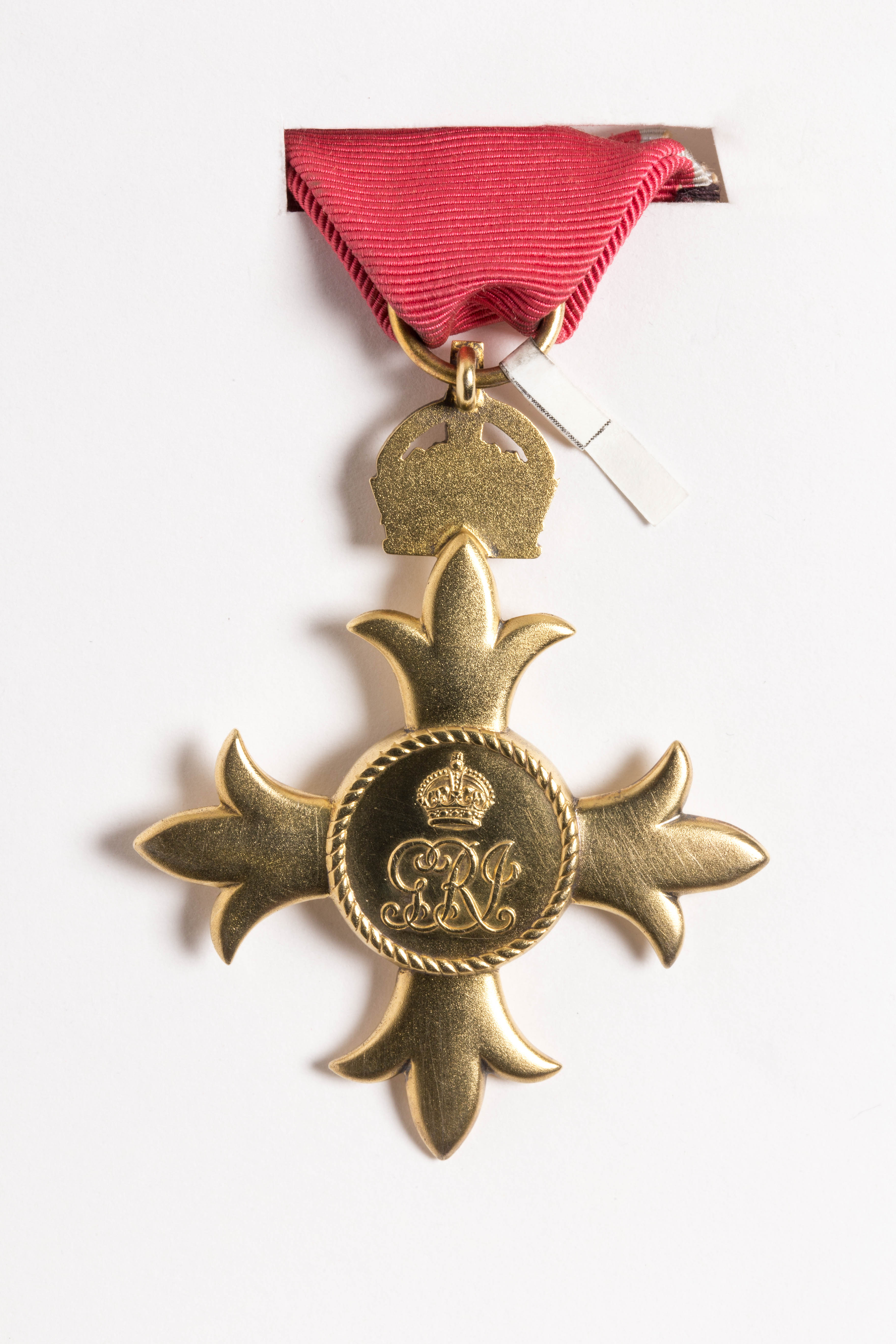
OBE medal

When Madge arrive in France summer 1939, she appears to be married to the Norwegian businessman Wilhelm Holst, whom she had met in Spain. The marriage seems to be a setup by the Intelligence Service and was annulled in 1945. Both joined the Special Operations Executive and made their way to Marseilles to work for MI9, a department of the British War Office. Marguerite was involved in setting up the "Garrow-O'Leary" escape line with Ian Garrow and Pat O'Leary.

She was appointed Officer of the Order of the British Empire (OBE) in January 1946. The citation reads:

"Mrs. Holst was in Paris, where her Norwegian husband Wilhelm Holst was engaged on relief work, when the Germans broke through in 1940, and subsequently moved from there to Marseilles. Here she got in touch with Captain Garrow, who had organised the first British escape route from France to Spain. At this time Garrow was living in Marseilles and it was necessary for his work that he should avoid contact with the French police. In this he was greatly helped by Mrs. Holst, who sheltered him and helped financially. Thanks to various other contacts of Mrs. Holst, Garrow was able to expand his organisation considerably. Mrs. Holst also assisted Lieutenant-Commander O’Leary on his arrival in France to work with Garrow. On the latter’s arrest, Mrs. Holst maintained contact with him in prison and sent his food. In the Spring of 1941, Mrs. Holst visited Lisbon with her husband and brought important information from the organisation. On subsequent trips, travelling as a Norwegian subject, she was obliged to fly by German civil aircraft, carrying information sewn in the lining of her coat. During one of her visits to Lisbon, Mrs. Holst was taught the use of secret inks for communication by post, and by this method continued to send from France regular despatches regarding the escape organisation. Demonstrating great coolness and bravery in conducting her dangerous work, Mrs. Holst never hesitated to undertake any task assigned to her. An English woman operating in enemy-occupied territory, she fully understood what would be the penalty if she was discovered. It was largely thanks to her that the original “Garrow-O’Leary” organisation was able to get established in Southern France, whereby several hundred escapers from Dunkirk days were enabled to return to the United Kingdom."

== Later life ==
After the war she was married a third time, to Thorkil A. D. Hansen in London in 1955. She died as Marguerite Hansen in Hendon in 1970. Thorkil had died in 1966.

On 12 May 2018 The Lord Mayor of Manchester, Councillor Eddy Newman, along with representatives of the Royal British Legion and the International Brigade Memorial Trust, unveiled a blue plaque on Manchester Road, Chorlton.
