= Operation Josephine B =

WW2 SOE operation in German-occupied France

- Location: 44.8067°N 0.6311°W
- Planned by: Special Operations Executive
- Objective: Destruction of an electrical transformer station in Pessac.
- Date: 11 May 1941 – 7 June 1941
- Executed by: United Kingdom; Free France
- Outcome: Allied success
- Location within France

Operation Josephine B (or Operation Josephine) was a military mission in June 1941 during the Second World War. The mission was organised jointly by the Free French and the British Special Operations Executive (SOE), together with the Royal Air Force for air drops. The operation was initially stalled by a lack of up-to-date information, but ultimately succeeded in its main objective, the destruction of an electrical transformer station in Pessac, near Bordeaux.

== Background ==
The transformer station in Pessac, near Bordeaux, had long been recognized by the SOE as a target of particular interest but difficult to reach by air. The plan was to drop a team of saboteurs by parachute; they were to break into the transformer station, attach bombs and incendiaries with delay timers. The bombs would wreck the transformers and the incendiaries would set fire to the transformer cooling oil to complete the destruction.

A team of six Polish volunteers was trained and equipped. They set off from RAF Tangmere; but a technical fault released their two containers of equipment over the lower Loire, and they had to turn back. The aircraft crashed on landing, killing some of the crew and seriously wounding all the soldiers.

The SOE then turned to its Free French (RF) section. Sergeant Jean Forman, Sub-lieutenant Raymond Cabard and Sub-Lieutenant André Varnier (aka Jacques Leblanc) were briefed for the operation. Forman had recently returned from Operation Savanna, the first attempt to insert SOE trained Free French paratroops into German-occupied France. That mission had failed leaving behind some of the agents including Joël Letac who had then travelled to Paris. The sabotage team were sent to SOE's Station XVII for training in industrial sabotage by Cecil Vandepeer Clarke.

The Norwegian Wilhelm Holst, an early recruited Special Operations Executive in DF section and Chef de Reseau Billet (Alexandre) in Free France, living in France, was asked to be their local contact after crossing the demarcation line, on their escape route out of France. The subject of the contact was for SOE to remain in communication with these individuals until they would find means of leaving France, or SOE could assist them to do so. SOE asked Mr Holst for any help or indication he could give them in this direction.

Operation Josephine B - equipment carried (Note: The figures in the table come directly from a document in the National Archive. For some small items it is not specified whether the item was carried on the person or in the container.)
	On man 1 (Forman)	In container for man 1	On man 2 (Cabard)	In container for man 2	On man 3 (Varnier)	In container for man 3
Automatic pistol	1	-	1	-	1	-
Spare clips	4	-	2	-	2	-
Rounds pistol ammunition	40	-	24	-	24	-
Fighting knife	1		1		1	
Torch	1		1		1	
Field dressing	1		1		1	
Grenades		4		2		2
Rope ladder		1				
Wire cutters		1		1		1
Rubber gloves		1		1		1
Days emergency ration		2		2		2
3.5 lb charges				4		4
Incendiary bombs				4		4
1 lb PE charge				1		1

Forman also had a compass, a watch and a whistle.

== Execution ==
The team was parachuted into France on the night of 11/12 May 1941; a full moon. They hid their container of equipment and reconnoitred their target. They were dismayed to discover a high tension wire just inside the top of the 9-foot-high (2.7 m) perimeter wall and the sound of people moving about inside. They also failed to obtain bicycles on which they had planned to make a silent getaway. Discouraged, they lost heart and gave up.

The team missed their 20 May rendezvous with the submarine sent to retrieve them and so set out for Paris. Forman had been given a couple of possible addresses before he left England; at one of these he met Joël Letac. Letac had been forced to abandon Operation Savanna, but he would not hear of giving up on Josephine B. Letac rallied the team and travelled with them back to the Bordeaux region.

In the night they seized a truck to go up to Pessac; the truck broke down, so they resorted to bicycles. They quickly found their explosives where they had hidden them on the first night - 100 metres from the transformer station. Varner quickly verified that the detonators would still work in spite of the moisture.

On the night of 7/8 June 1941, Forman climbed the perimeter wall and jumped down into the yard while carefully avoiding any contact with the high voltage cable. Then he simply opened the door to his comrades who brought in all their equipment. In less than half an hour plastic explosive in boxes and connected to magnetic incendiary bombs was placed on each of the eight main transformers. The four men made their get-away, pedalling with all their might, as explosions sounded and flames rose into the sky. Searchlights vainly probed the sky for bombers.

The team asked for evacuation by Lysander. This was not provided and instead they were ordered to return to England via Spain. The sabotage team made for Spain at a leisurely pace; they spent a quarter of a million francs (about £1,400 in 1941 roughly equivalent to £61,000 in 2025) over a period of two months and "...left a trail of broken glass, if not hearts, behind them". Cabard was arrested just before they crossed the Pyrenees. The other three made it back to England during August. Cabard later escaped and was back with SOE by November.

== Aftermath ==
Six of the eight transformers were destroyed, resulting in the Italian submarine base at Bordeaux being hampered for weeks and a variety of other problems for the Italian and German occupiers. The operation was SOE's first success in occupied France and it considerably enhanced the organisation's standing. It was assumed that the explosives on two of the transformers must have slipped off – they were all very wet. Work in the Bordeaux submarine base and in numerous factories was held up for weeks. The all-electric trains from south-western France had to be withdrawn and replaced with steam locomotives.

All the spare transformer oil in France was needed to effect repairs, and these were not completed for a whole year.

The commune of Pessac was fined one million francs, 250 local people were imprisoned and a curfew was imposed from 9:30 pm to 5 am. Twelve German soldiers were shot for failing to protect the station against the saboteurs.

News of the attack reached Britain on 19 June. Hugh Dalton, then Minister for Economic Warfare passed the news to Churchill on 25 June; Dalton wrote: "We may therefore take it as practically certain that three [sic] men, dropped from an aeroplane, have succeeded in destroying an important industrial target ... This strongly suggests that many industrial targets, especially if they cover only a very small area, are more effectively attacked by SOE methods than by air bombardment." (Note: Hugh Dalton quoted by Lyman.) This was SOE's first operational success in occupied France and it considerably enhanced the organisation's standing.

General de Gaulle named Joel Letac, who survived many exploits, Compagnon de la Liberation (Companion of the Liberation), the highest honour of the French Resistance.

== See also ==
- List of SOE agents
- List of SOE establishments
- List of Special Operations Executive operations in World War II
- High-voltage transformer fire barriers
