= Wilhelm Holst =

Norwegian businessman (1895–1949)

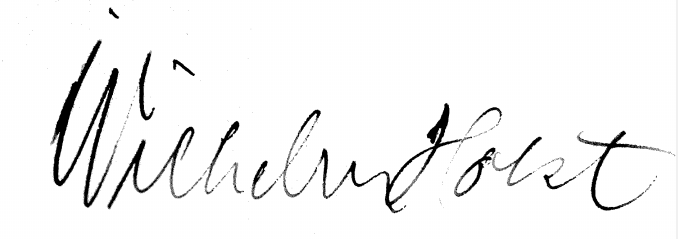

Wilhelm Christopher Holst (born 27 October 1895 in Drammen – Norway, died 2 November 1949 in Oslo – Norway) was a Norwegian businessman who worked for the French resistance movement Free France during World War II, as a P2 agent and Chef de Reseau Billett (Alexandre) in France.

After the German invasion of Norway April 9 1940, and the execution of his two sons (15 and 16 years old) by the Germans on April 15 1940, he mobilized a strong dislike for the nazis and founded the secret circuit Billet, based in Paris and Marseille, on memorial day 1941. Prior to this, he worked for MI9 and was related to the operation of the Pat O'Leary Line in Marseille. In spring 1941 he was recruited through the Norwegian Ministry of Defense's intelligence office in London, as one of the first five Special Operations Executive (SOE) in the DF section for France, Clandestine & Communications.

In May 1941 Holst was asked to be the local contact for the agents carrying out the Operation Josephine B in France. When the agents had to cross the demarcation line separating Vichy and German occupied France, he was their local contact on their escape route out of France. The subject of the contact was for SOE to remain in communication with these individuals until they would find means of leaving France, or SOE could assist them to do so. SOE asked Holst for any help or indication he could give them in this direction.

Wilhelm Holst was awarded several French awards for his efforts during the German occupation of France. He was the first Scandinavian to be awarded the Resistance Medal, a French award for his efforts in the French resistance movement, des Forces Francaises Combattantes. He was group leader of one of 60 resistance groups, and was responsible for an important sabotage operation on the battery foundations in the coastal fortifications at Marseille before the Battle of Marseille in August 1944.

Wilhelm Holst was awarded the French Legion of Honor, with the rank of knight, as well as the Croix de Guerre with palm and the Honneur Patrie for his efforts in the French resistance movement.

On February 27, 1948, Wilhelm Holst was appointed as a knight of the 1st class of the Order of Saint Olav for merits for Norwegian interests in France before and during the war.
