= Georges Bergé =

French Army general (1909–1997)

- Born: 3 January 1909; Belmont, Gers, France
- Died: 15 September 1997 (aged 88); Mimizan, France
- Military career
- Allegiance: Free France; France
- Branch: French Airborne
- Service years: 1929–1930; 1933–1962
- Rank: Brigadier general (1961)
- Commands: 1ère Compagnie de Chasseurs Parachutistes (1e CCP); French Squadron SAS; 14e Régiment d'infanterie parachutiste de Choc (RIPC)
- Conflicts: World War II; Suez Crisis; Algerian War
- Awards: Commander of the Légion d'honneur Companion of the Liberation; Grand Officier of the National Order of Merit; Croix de Guerre 1939-1945; Croix de la Valeur militaire Officer of the Order of the British Empire (UK); Military Cross (UK); Commander of the Order of George I (GR)

Georges Roger Pierre Bergé (3 January 1909 – 15 September 1997) was a French Army general who served during World War II. He enlisted in the Free French Forces, where he took command of the 1re compagnie de chasseurs parachutistes (1st Parachute Chaser Company). He is mentioned by David Stirling as one of the co-founders of the Special Air Service (SAS). In Britain and Egypt, he organised the training for Allied agents sent to France and led the first airborne mission in occupied France, named Operation Savannah. He fought in Syria and Crete. After his capture by the Germans, he was imprisoned in Colditz Castle.

== Biography ==
=== Youth ===
Georges Bergé was born in January 1909 in Belmont, in the Gers département, France. He was drafted in 1929, and incorporated in the 24th infantry regiment in Mont-de-Marsan, where he trained as a reserve officer. In April 1930, he demobilised as a second lieutenant. In 1933, he eventually chose a military career and integrated l'école de l'Infanterie et des Chars (Infantry and tanks school) in Saint-Maixent. He became a lieutenant in 1934.

== Second World War ==
=== 1940 ===
- May. He fought on the frontline. On 18th, while leading a successful counter-attack near Bousies in the North, he was wounded twice and transported to Arras. After hospitalisation in Caen, he was evacuated further south.
- June.

17 - While visiting his parents in Mimizan, Landes, he heard marshal Pétain's radio-broadcast speech.
21 - Refusing the armistice, Georges Bergé embarked on a Polish boat in Saint-Jean-de-Luz and sailed for England.
24 - Joining the Free French forces in London, he met general Charles de Gaulle at Saint Stephen's House and suggested that he form an airborne battalion.

- He integrated the air force staff of the Free French forces.
- September. The 1re Compagnie d'Infanterie de l'Air or 1re CIA (1st Airborne Infantry regiment) was formed with Bergé as its commanding officer.
- He trained in the Ringway school (Manchester).
- December. Bergé and his men were now paratroopers.

=== 1941 ===
- March.

15 - He parachuted in France as leader of the first Free French mission in occupied France, Operation Savannah, planned by the SOE.
22- He joined Mimizan and contacted friends to form a resistance network.

- April. On the 5th, he came back to England by submarine. Mission Savannah was over.
- Under the supervision of the Deuxième Bureau (then the Bureau Central de Renseignements et d'Action, the Free French external military intelligence agency) and the SOE, he established a special agents school – 36th station of the SOE, Inchmery House, New Forest – where most of the agents sent in France in 1941 and 1942 were trained.
- July. On the 25th, with the 1re CIA, he was allocated in Damascus (Meze airfield)

=== 1942 ===
- January. Allocated in Kabrit in the Combined Training Center, west bank of the Suez Canal, he formed the French SAS squadron. As the SAS expanded, the French squadron would be the first of a range of units to be 'acquired' by David Stirling.
- June.

His unit was tasked to attack enemy airfields in the Mediterranean zone. Bergé chose the Heraklion airfield, in Crete (Operation Albumen). With a group of four men, he managed to destroy 20 enemy planes.

19 - He was captured at the conclusion of his mission. He was imprisoned in XC Oflag in Lübeck, from which he tried in vain to escape.

=== 1943 ===
- January. Transferred in Colditz Castle (Oflag IV-C), he found there Major Stirling, captured in a 1943 raid in Tunisia, and Captain Augustin Jordan.

=== 1945 ===
- April. On 16, he was set free by Patton's army.

== Post war ==
Lieutenant-colonel Bergé was successively allocated to the Parachute inspection administration, to the military cabinet of the Provisional Government of the French Republic, to the National Defense' staff. He was then the military attaché for the French embassy in Rome.

- August 1951 – July 1953. He commanded the 14th Régiment d'infanterie parachutiste de Choc (RIPC) in Toulouse.
- 1953–1957. Colonel Bergé was the assistant of General Pierre Barjot, commander of the French airborne forces during the Suez Crisis.

== Honours and awards ==
France

- Commander of the Legion of Honour
- Companion of the Liberation (17 November 1945)
- Grand Officer of the Order of Merit
- Croix de Guerre 1939-1945, 4 citations
- Cross of Military Valour, with palm
- Aeronautics Medal

Foreign

- Officer of the Order of the British Empire
- Military Cross (United Kingdom)
- Cruz Militar (Spain)
- Commander of the Order of George I (Greece)
- Commander of the Order of Ouissam Alaouite (Morocco)

== Sources ==
- Forgeat, Raymond (1999). Ils ont choisi de vivre la France libre: Georges Bergé, Jean Le Gall, Louis Le Goff, Jacques Mouhot, Michel Legrand, François Martin, André Zirnheld. Atlante.
- Georges Bergé on the Order of the Liberation's website
