= Saint-Pabu =

Saint-Pabu Sant-Pabu
- Commune
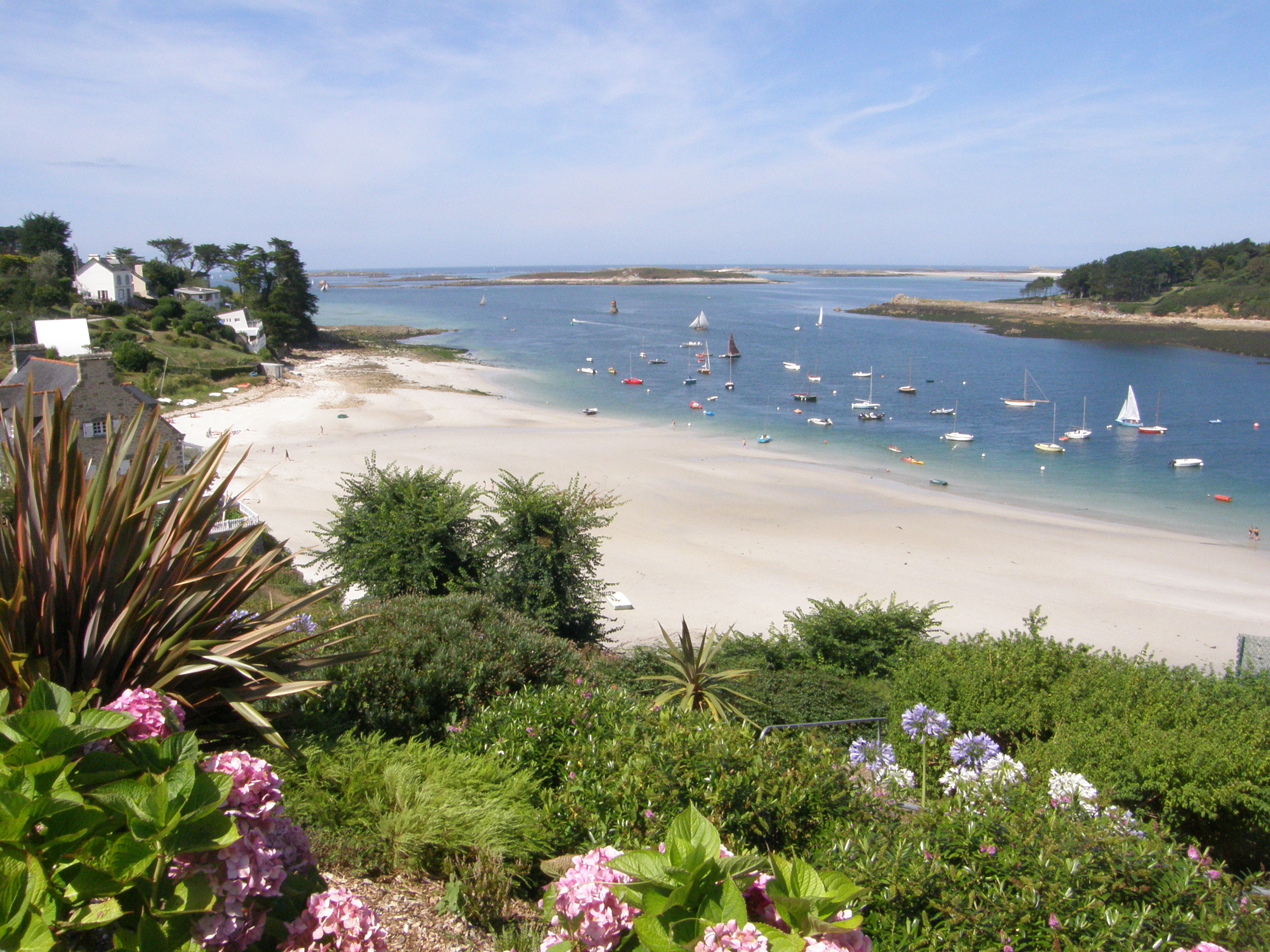
- The small beach on the left bank of the Aber-Benoît in Saint-Pabu

- Coat of arms
- Location of Saint-Pabu
- Location within France Location within Brittany
- Coordinates: 48°33′55″N 4°35′47″W
- Country: France
- Region: Brittany
- Department: Finistère
- Arrondissement: Brest
- Canton: Plabennec

Government
  - Mayor (2020–2026): David Briant
- Area^{1}: 9.94 km^{2} (3.84 sq mi)
- Highest elevation: 56 m (184 ft)
- Lowest elevation: 0 m (0 ft)
- Population (2023): 2,087
  - Density: 210/km^{2} (544/sq mi)
- Time zone: UTC+01:00 (CET)
  - Summer (DST): UTC+02:00 (CEST)
- INSEE/Postal code: 29257 /29830
- Website: www.saint-pabu.bzh
- ^{1} French Land Register data, which excludes lakes, ponds, glaciers > 1 km^{2} (0.386 sq mi or 247 acres) and river estuaries.

Saint-Pabu (French pronunciation: [sɛ̃ paby]; Breton: Sant-Pabu) is a commune in the Finistère department of Brittany in north-western France.

== Population ==
Inhabitants of Saint-Pabu are called in French Saint-Pabusiens.

Historical population
Year	Pop.	±% p.a.
1968	1,283	—
1975	1,278	−0.06%
1982	1,380	+1.10%
1990	1,392	+0.11%
1999	1,479	+0.68%
2007	1,774	+2.30%
2012	2,051	+2.94%
2017	2,074	+0.22%
2023	2,087	+0.10%
Source: INSEE

== Toponymy ==
The name Pabu comes from one of the names of Saint Tugdual.

== Breton language ==
The municipality launched a linguistic plan concerning the Breton language through Ya d'ar brezhoneg on 14 January 2006.

== See also ==
- Communes of the Finistère department
