= French Army Special Forces Command =

French Army command charged with overseeing special forces units

French Army Special Actions Command
- Commandement des actions spéciales Terre
- Badge of the BFST
- Active: 1 July 2002–30 June 2016 (brigade); 1 July 2016 (Command)
- Country: France
- Branch: French Army
- Type: Special Forces
- Garrison/HQ: Pau, Pyrénées-Atlantiques France
- Colors: Blue and Red
- Abbreviation: COM FST

The Army Special Actions Command (French: Commandement des actions spéciales terre (CAST)) regroups the various special operations forces units of the French Army and is the command charged with overseeing them. It is based in Pau, Pyrénées-Atlantiques.

== History ==
The CAST is the heir of the Independent Special Grouping (Groupement Spécial Autonome, GSA) created in 1997 and then commanded the 1er RPIMa and a special operations flight belonging to the 4th command and manoeuvre helicopters regiment (4e Régiment d'Hélicoptères de Commandement et de Manœuvre, 4e RHCM) of the ALAT.

In 1998, the Détachement ALAT des Opérations Spéciales (DAOS, ALAT detachment for special operations) was created.

The brigade des forces spéciales Terre (BFST) was activated on 1 July 2002 and included the 13e RDP. The BFST conduct an annual exercise called Gorgones (gorgons) to ensure interoperability of the three units. The name Gorgones refers to the three units, as the three mythological figures.

The BFST has supported the peacekeeping operation in Côte d'Ivoire (Opération Licorne) and Afghanistan (Mission Héraclès).

The brigade des forces spéciales Terre became the commandement des forces spéciales Terre (COM FST, division level) on 1 July 2016. It became the commandement des actions spéciales Terre (CAST) as of January 2024.

== Structure ==
- Army Special Actions Command
  - Special Forces Command and Signals Company, in Pau (Compagnie de Commandement et de Transmissions des Forces Spéciales (CCTFS))
  - 1st Marine Infantry Parachute Regiment, in Bayonne (1^{er} Régiment de Parachutistes d'Infanterie de Marine (1^{er} RPIMa))
  - 13th Parachute Dragoon Regiment, in Martignas-sur-Jalle (13^{e} Régiment de Dragons Parachutistes (13^{e} RDP))
  - 4th Special Forces Helicopter Regiment, in Pau (4^{e} Régiment d'Hélicoptères des Forces Spéciales (4^{e} RHFS))
  - Special Operations Support Group, in Pau (Groupement d'Appui aux Opérations Spéciales (GAOS))
  - Special Forces Academy, in Pau (Académie des Forces Spéciales (Académie FS))

== See also ==
- List of French paratrooper units
