= Meucon =

Meucon Meukon
- Commune
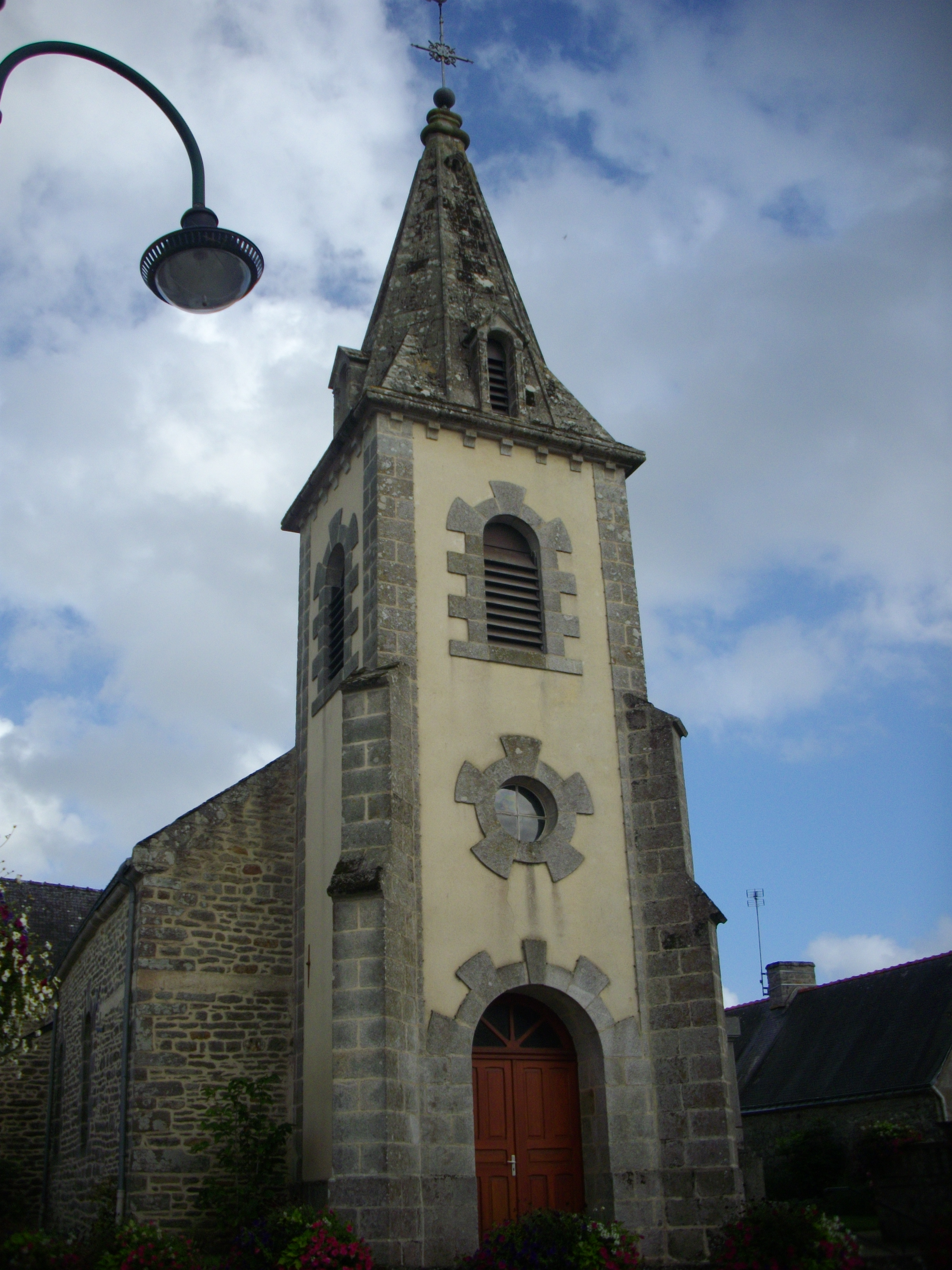
- The church in Meucon
- Location of Meucon
- Location within France Location within Brittany
- Coordinates: 47°43′05″N 2°45′46″W
- Country: France
- Region: Brittany
- Department: Morbihan
- Arrondissement: Vannes
- Canton: Vannes-3
- Intercommunality: Golfe du Morbihan - Vannes Agglomération

Government
  - Mayor (2026–32): Pierrick Messager
- Area^{1}: 5.73 km^{2} (2.21 sq mi)
- Highest elevation: 132 m (433 ft)
- Lowest elevation: 45 m (148 ft)
- Population (2023): 2,280
  - Density: 398/km^{2} (1,030/sq mi)
- Time zone: UTC+01:00 (CET)
  - Summer (DST): UTC+02:00 (CEST)
- INSEE/Postal code: 56132 /56890
- ^{1} French Land Register data, which excludes lakes, ponds, glaciers > 1 km^{2} (0.386 sq mi or 247 acres) and river estuaries.

Meucon (French pronunciation: [møkɔ̃]; Breton: Meukon) is a commune in the Morbihan department of Brittany in north-western France.

== Population ==
Historical population
| Year | Pop. | ±% p.a. |
|---|---|---|
| 1968 | 506 | — |
| 1975 | 606 | +2.61% |
| 1982 | 794 | +3.94% |
| 1990 | 1,100 | +4.16% |
| 1999 | 1,268 | +1.59% |
| 2007 | 2,011 | +5.93% |
| 2012 | 2,212 | +1.92% |
| 2017 | 2,248 | +0.32% |
| 2023 | 2,280 | +0.24% |
Source: INSEE

Inhabitants of Meucon are called in French Meuconais.

== See also ==
- Communes of the Morbihan department
