= 2016 in the United States =

- Decades: 1990s; 2000s; 2010s; 2020s; 2030s
- See also: History of the United States (2016–present); Timeline of United States history (2010–present); List of years in the United States

Events in the year 2016 in the United States.

== Incumbents ==
=== Federal government ===
- President: Barack Obama (D-Illinois)
- Vice President: Joe Biden (D-Delaware)
- Chief Justice: John Roberts (Maryland)
- Speaker of the House of Representatives: Paul Ryan (R-Wisconsin)
- Senate Majority Leader: Mitch McConnell (R-Kentucky)
- Congress: 114th

==== State governments ====
Governors and lieutenant governors

=== Governors ===
- Governor of Alabama: Robert J. Bentley (Republican)
- Governor of Alaska: Bill Walker (Independent)
- Governor of Arizona: Doug Ducey (Republican)
- Governor of Arkansas: Asa Hutchinson (Republican)
- Governor of California: Jerry Brown (Democratic)
- Governor of Colorado: John Hickenlooper (Democratic)
- Governor of Connecticut: Dan Malloy (Democratic)
- Governor of Delaware: Jack Markell (Democratic)
- Governor of Florida: Rick Scott (Republican)
- Governor of Georgia: Nathan Deal (Republican)
- Governor of Hawaii: David Ige (Democratic)
- Governor of Idaho: Butch Otter (Republican)
- Governor of Illinois: Bruce Rauner (Republican)
- Governor of Indiana: Mike Pence (Republican)
- Governor of Iowa: Terry Branstad (Republican)
- Governor of Kansas: Sam Brownback (Republican)
- Governor of Kentucky: Matt Bevin (Republican)
- Governor of Louisiana: Bobby Jindal (Republican) (until January 11), John Bel Edwards (Democratic) (starting January 11)
- Governor of Maine: Paul LePage (Republican)
- Governor of Maryland: Larry Hogan (Republican)
- Governor of Massachusetts: Charlie Baker (Republican)
- Governor of Michigan: Rick Snyder (Republican)
- Governor of Minnesota: Mark Dayton (Democratic)
- Governor of Mississippi: Phil Bryant (Republican)
- Governor of Missouri: Jay Nixon (Democratic)
- Governor of Montana: Steve Bullock (Democratic)
- Governor of Nebraska: Pete Ricketts (Republican)
- Governor of Nevada: Brian Sandoval (Republican)
- Governor of New Hampshire: Maggie Hassan (Democratic)
- Governor of New Jersey: Chris Christie (Republican)
- Governor of New Mexico: Susana Martinez (Republican)
- Governor of New York: Andrew Cuomo (Democratic)
- Governor of North Carolina: Pat McCrory (Republican)
- Governor of North Dakota: Jack Dalrymple (Republican) (until December 15), Doug Burgum (Republican) (starting December 15)
- Governor of Ohio: John Kasich (Republican)
- Governor of Oklahoma: Mary Fallin (Republican)
- Governor of Oregon: Kate Brown (Democratic)
- Governor of Pennsylvania: Tom Wolf (Democratic)
- Governor of Rhode Island: Gina Raimondo (Democratic)
- Governor of South Carolina: Nikki Haley (Republican)
- Governor of South Dakota: Dennis Daugaard (Republican)
- Governor of Tennessee: Bill Haslam (Republican)
- Governor of Texas: Greg Abbott (Republican)
- Governor of Utah: Gary Herbert (Republican)
- Governor of Vermont: Peter Shumlin (Democratic)
- Governor of Virginia: Terry McAuliffe (Democratic)
- Governor of Washington: Jay Inslee (Democratic)
- Governor of West Virginia: Earl Ray Tomblin (Democratic)
- Governor of Wisconsin: Scott Walker (Republican)
- Governor of Wyoming: Matt Mead (Republican)

=== Lieutenant governors ===
- Lieutenant Governor of Alabama: Kay Ivey (Republican)
- Lieutenant Governor of Alaska: Byron Mallott (Independent)
- Lieutenant Governor of Arkansas: Tim Griffin (Republican)
- Lieutenant Governor of California: Gavin Newsom (Democratic)
- Lieutenant Governor of Colorado: Joseph Garcia (Democratic)
- Lieutenant Governor of Connecticut: Nancy Wyman (Democratic)
- Lieutenant Governor of Delaware: vacant
- Lieutenant Governor of Florida: Carlos López-Cantera (Republican)
- Lieutenant Governor of Georgia: Casey Cagle (Republican)
- Lieutenant Governor of Hawaii: Shan Tsutsui (Democratic)
- Lieutenant Governor of Idaho: Brad Little (Republican)
- Lieutenant Governor of Illinois: Evelyn Sanguinetti (Republican)
- Lieutenant Governor of Indiana:
  - until March 2: Sue Ellspermann (Republican)
  - March 2 – 3: vacant
  - starting March 3: Eric Holcomb (Republican)
- Lieutenant Governor of Iowa: Kim Reynolds (Republican)
- Lieutenant Governor of Kansas: Jeff Colyer (Republican)
- Lieutenant Governor of Kentucky: Jenean Hampton (Republican)
- Lieutenant Governor of Louisiana: Jay Dardenne (Republican) (until January 11), Billy Nungesser (Republican) (starting January 11)
- Lieutenant Governor of Maryland: Boyd Rutherford (Republican)
- Lieutenant Governor of Massachusetts: Karyn Polito (Republican)
- Lieutenant Governor of Michigan: Brian Calley (Republican)
- Lieutenant Governor of Minnesota: Tina Smith (Democratic)
- Lieutenant Governor of Mississippi: Tate Reeves (Republican)
- Lieutenant Governor of Missouri: Peter Kinder (Republican)
- Lieutenant Governor of Montana: Angela McLean (Democratic) (until January 3), Mike Cooney (Democratic) (starting January 3)
- Lieutenant Governor of Nebraska: Mike Foley (Republican)
- Lieutenant Governor of Nevada: Mark Hutchison (Republican)
- Lieutenant Governor of New Jersey: Kim Guadagno (Republican)
- Lieutenant Governor of New Mexico: John Sanchez (Republican)
- Lieutenant Governor of New York: Kathy Hochul (Democratic)
- Lieutenant Governor of North Carolina: Dan Forest (Republican)
- Lieutenant Governor of North Dakota: Drew Wrigley (Republican) (until December 15), Brent Sanford (Republican) (starting December 15)
- Lieutenant Governor of Ohio: Mary Taylor (Republican)
- Lieutenant Governor of Oklahoma: Todd Lamb (Republican)
- Lieutenant Governor of Pennsylvania: Michael J. Stack III (Democratic)
- Lieutenant Governor of Rhode Island: Daniel McKee (Democratic)
- Lieutenant Governor of South Carolina: Henry McMaster (Republican)
- Lieutenant Governor of South Dakota: Matt Michels (Republican)
- Lieutenant Governor of Tennessee: Ron Ramsey (Republican)
- Lieutenant Governor of Texas: Dan Patrick (Republican)
- Lieutenant Governor of Utah: Spencer Cox (Republican)
- Lieutenant Governor of Vermont: Phil Scott (Republican)
- Lieutenant Governor of Virginia: Ralph Northam (Democratic)
- Lieutenant Governor of Washington: Brad Owen (Democratic)
- Lieutenant Governor of Wisconsin: Rebecca Kleefisch (Republican)

== Events ==
=== January ===
- January 1 – The following laws go into effect:
  - Hawaii becomes the first state to raise the legal smoking age to 21.
  - Texas allows the open carry of guns in public places.
  - Tennessee launches the nation's first statewide registry of animal abusers.
  - Washington, D.C., and Montgomery County, Maryland, ban the storage of food in Styrofoam containers.
- January 2–26 – The 3 Percenters and several other armed militia organizations take over the headquarters of the United States Fish and Wildlife Service's Malheur National Wildlife Refuge in Harney County, Oregon, in a series of incidents stemming from the 2014 Bundy standoff. The Federal Bureau of Investigation (FBI) ends the occupation with a shootout, killing one militiaman and arresting five others, including leader Ammon Bundy.
- January 5 – President Obama introduces executive orders to expand the enforcement of federal gun laws.
- January 6 – Star Wars: The Force Awakens becomes the highest-grossing film in North America, beating previous record-holder Avatar's lifetime gross of $760 million in just 20 days of release.
- January 8 – The Obama administration announces an alliance with tech companies—including Apple, Google, Facebook, Microsoft, and Twitter—to block the recruitment of Americans to Islamic extremist groups, specifically the Islamic State of Iraq and the Levant (ISIL), via social media.
- January 9 – For the first time in its history, the national Powerball lottery prize surpasses $1 billion.
- January 10 – 73rd Golden Globe Awards: The Revenant wins the Golden Globe Award for Best Motion Picture – Drama, with Leonardo DiCaprio winning the award for Best Actor – Motion Picture Drama and Alejandro G. Iñárritu winning Best Director. The Martian wins the award for Best Motion Picture – Musical or Comedy, and Matt Damon wins Best Actor – Motion Picture Musical or Comedy. Brie Larson wins Best Actress in a Motion Picture – Drama for Room, and Jennifer Lawrence wins Best Actress – Motion Picture Comedy or Musical for Joy. Mr. Robot wins Best Television Series – Drama; Mozart in the Jungle wins Best Television Series – Musical or Comedy; and Wolf Hall wins Best Miniseries or Television Film.
- January 12 – President Obama gives his final State of the Union Address to the 114th United States Congress.
- January 14 – The nominees for the 88th Academy Awards are announced at the Samuel Goldwyn Theater in Beverly Hills, California. The nominees for Best Picture are The Big Short, Bridge of Spies, Brooklyn, Mad Max: Fury Road, The Martian, The Revenant, Room, and Spotlight. The nominees are criticized for their lack of diversity, resulting in boycotts by celebrities like Will Smith and Spike Lee, an official motion by the Academy of Motion Picture Arts and Sciences to increase diversity in its membership. Chris Rock decides to stay on as Awards host and address the issue during the ceremony.
- January 15 – Myloh Jaqory Mason, a fugitive on the FBI's Ten Most Wanted list, is arrested in Thornton, Colorado, after being added to the list on December 17, 2015, for two bank robberies and two attempted murders.
- January 16
  - President Obama announces a federal state of emergency in Flint, Michigan, allowing additional support from the Federal Emergency Management Agency and the Department of Homeland Security in response to the ongoing contamination of tap water in the city.
  - The United States lifts several economic sanctions against Iran in accordance with a multinational agreement made in July 2014 concerning Iran's nuclear program. Sanctions concerning Iran's human rights abuses, missile activity, and support for terrorism remain in effect.
- January 21–24 – A crippling winter storm hits the central and eastern United States, producing several feet of snow and ice (as well as strong winds and tornadoes in some areas) and killing 55 people.
- January 25 – A Texas grand jury finds no wrongdoing on the part of Planned Parenthood after a series of undercover videos made by the Center for Medical Progress (CMP), an anti-abortion organization, purported to show Planned Parenthood employees selling fetal tissue and organs. The grand jury indicts CMP founder David Daleiden and another videographer.
- January 30 – During a brawl between rival motorcycle clubs, gunfire and stabbings kill one person and injure seven at the National Western Complex in Denver, Colorado.

=== February ===
- February 1
  - The February 2016 North American storm complex causes power outages for more than 70,000 people in Southern California.
  - The Iowa caucuses are held, beginning the Democratic and Republican nomination processes for the 2016 presidential election. Senator Ted Cruz (R-Texas) wins the Republican caucuses, and former Secretary of State Hillary Clinton wins the Democratic caucuses. After poor showings in Iowa, Democratic candidate Martin O'Malley and Republican candidate Mike Huckabee suspend their campaigns.
- February 3 – Senator Rand Paul (R-Kentucky) and former Senator Rick Santorum (R-Pennsylvania) suspend their presidential candidacies.
  - Barack Obama becomes the first U.S. president to visit a U.S. mosque in Baltimore, Maryland.
- February 4 – Six people are found dead, five from stab wounds and one from gunshot wounds, at a house in Chicago.
- February 7
  - Super Bowl 50 is played at Levi's Stadium in Santa Clara, California. The Denver Broncos defeat the Carolina Panthers by a score of 24–10.
- February 9 – The New Hampshire primaries are held. Donald Trump wins the Republican primary, and Bernie Sanders wins the Democratic primary.
- February 10 – New Jersey Governor Chris Christie and former Hewlett-Packard CEO Carly Fiorina suspend their campaigns for the Republican nomination.
- February 12 – Former Virginia Governor Jim Gilmore suspends his campaign for the Republican presidential nomination.
- February 13 – Supreme Court Justice Antonin Scalia dies at the age of 79.
- February 14 – The 2016 North American cold wave causes record low temperatures in New England.
- February 15 – 58th Annual Grammy Awards: "Uptown Funk" by Mark Ronson, featuring Bruno Mars, wins the Grammy Award for Record of the Year. Taylor Swift wins Album of the Year for 1989, Meghan Trainor wins Best New Artist, and Song of the Year is awarded to "Thinking Out Loud", by Ed Sheeran and Amy Wadge.
- February 18 – 106-year old civil rights activist, Virginia McLaurin, visits Barack Obama at the White House, becoming the oldest known-person and first centenarian to the visit the White House.
- February 20 – A man kills six people and injures two in Kalamazoo, Michigan, before being apprehended by the police.
- February 21 – Denny Hamlin wins the Daytona 500 in the closest finish in the race's 58-year history, beating Martin Truex Jr. by 11 thousandths of a second.
- February 25 – A disgruntled former employee opens fire in an office building in Hesston, Kansas, killing three people and injuring fourteen others.
- February 27 – Three people are stabbed at a Ku Klux Klan rally in Anaheim, California, and several people are arrested.
- February 28 – 88th Academy Awards: The ceremony, hosted by Chris Rock, is held at Dolby Theatre in Hollywood. Tom McCarthy's Spotlight wins the Academy Award for Best Picture. Leonardo DiCaprio wins Best Actor for his performance in The Revenant, his first acting Oscar in five nominations. Brie Larson wins Best Actress for her performance in Room, her first acting Oscar and first nomination. Alejandro G. Iñárritu wins his second Best Director award for The Revenant, becoming the first director to win back-to-back Oscars since Joseph L. Mankiewicz in 1949 and 1950. George Miller's Mad Max: Fury Road wins six awards, the most for the evening. The telecast garners over 34.4 million viewers.
- February 29 – H2, History's secondary network, becomes Viceland, a lifestyle channel aimed at millennials which will include programming about music, cooking, sports, technology and hard-hitting documentaries. The change comes after A&E Networks purchased a 10% stake in Vice Media, Inc. in August 2014.

=== March ===
- March 1 – Super Tuesday: Hillary Clinton and Donald Trump each win seven states on the Democratic and Republican sides, respectively. In the Democratic primaries, Clinton takes Alabama, Arkansas, Georgia, Massachusetts, Tennessee, Texas, and Virginia; Bernie Sanders takes Colorado, Minnesota, Oklahoma, and Vermont. In the Republican primaries, Trump wins Alabama, Arkansas, Georgia, Massachusetts, Tennessee, Vermont, and Virginia; Ted Cruz wins Alaska, Oklahoma, and Texas; and Senator Marco Rubio (R-Florida) wins Minnesota.
- March 3 – 2012 Republican nominee Mitt Romney condemns GOP frontrunner Donald Trump in a speech at the University of Utah.
- March 4
  - Retired neurosurgeon Ben Carson suspends his campaign for the Republican presidential nomination.
  - Walt Disney Animation Studios' 55th feature film, Zootopia, is released in theatres to acclaim as the studio's most critically well-received film since 1994's The Lion King. It is, at that point, Disney's second-most commercially successful animated film behind 2013's Frozen and the second to cross the billion-dollar mark.
- March 9
  - Pablo Antonio Serrano-Vitorino, an illegal immigrant from Mexico, is arrested on suspicion of killing five men in a shooting spree.
  - The death toll in the country's largest outbreak of Elizabethkingia meningoseptica rises to 18 in Wisconsin, with 44 more infected.
  - Six people are killed and three others injured in a mass shooting at a house in Wilkinsburg, Pennsylvania.
- March 11 – At least four people are injured and five are arrested in Chicago when protesters demonstrating against Donald Trump scuffle with Trump supporters at a canceled Trump rally.
- March 14 – Abu Omar al-Shishani, a commander for the Islamic State, dies after being wounded in a U.S. airstrike near Al-Shaddadah, Syria, on March 4.
- March 15 – Marco Rubio suspends his campaign for the Republican presidential nomination after losing the primary in his home state, Florida.
- March 16 – President Obama nominates Merrick Garland to replace Antonin Scalia on the Supreme Court.
- March 21 – President Obama lands in Cuba for a meeting with Cuban President Raúl Castro, becoming the first U.S. president to visit Cuba since 1928.
- March 25 – Batman v Superman: Dawn of Justice, directed by Zack Snyder, is released as the second film in the DC Extended Universe and a follow-up to 2013's Man of Steel. An extended cut, dubbed the "Ultimate Edition", is later released digitally on June 28.
- March 28
  - The Department of Justice announces that it has unlocked the iPhone of a suspect in the 2015 San Bernardino attack without the help of Apple, after a heated public debate over the department's handling of encryption software in counter-terrorism efforts.
  - The United States Capitol is placed under lockdown after a man opens fire near the Capitol Visitor Center. The suspect is shot by police and taken into custody.
- March 31–April 1 – The 2016 Nuclear Security Summit is held at the Walter E. Washington Convention Center in Washington, D.C., with 58 participants in attendance. It is the fourth edition of the conference, following the 2014 Nuclear Security Summit.

=== April ===
- April 2
  - A coalition of progressive groups begins a ten-day march from Philadelphia to Washington, D.C., with the goal of revealing corruption in campaign finance and "rigged voting laws". The group also demands a Senate hearing on President Obama's Supreme Court nomination. Participants include political commentator Cenk Uygur, actress Rosario Dawson, law professor Lawrence Lessig, and Ben & Jerry's co-founders Ben Cohen and Jerry Greenfield. As of April 18, more than 1,200 protesters had been arrested.
  - The United States Air Force deploys twelve F-15 Eagles and 350 personnel to Iceland and the Netherlands to deter further Russian aggression in Europe.
  - A Lancair IV monoplane crashes into a parked car along a highway 50 miles north of San Diego, injuring five people and killing one.
- April 3 – An Amtrak passenger train on the Palmetto route, traveling from New York City to Savannah, Georgia, with 341 passengers and seven crew members on board, derails in Chester, Pennsylvania, after striking a backhoe on the tracks, injuring 35 and killing two.
- April 4 – The Villanova Wildcats defeat the North Carolina Tar Heels, 77–74, in the NCAA Men's Championship.
- April 5
  - Pharmaceutical companies Pfizer and Allergan terminate a planned $160 billion merger because of the Obama administration's new regulations on tax inversion. Pfizer will have to pay $400 million to Allergan for expenses in relation to the deal.
  - Mississippi Governor Phil Bryant signs a bill allowing private businesses and religious groups to deny services to gay, lesbian, bisexual, and transgender (LGBT) people. The law is later blocked by federal judge Carlton W. Reeves.
  - The Connecticut Huskies defeat the Syracuse Orange, 82–51, in the NCAA Women's Championship.
  - The Wisconsin primaries are held. Ted Cruz beats Donald Trump and Ohio Governor John Kasich to win the Republican race. Bernie Sanders defeats Hillary Clinton in the Democratic race.
  - Disappearance of Arianna Fitts in San Francisco, California. The two-year-old child and her mother went missing together, the girl's mother was found dead on April 8. No trace of Arianna Fitts has ever been found.
- April 7 – American Idol concludes its 15-season run on Fox, with Trent Harmon being declared the final winner of the reality competition series' original run. (Idol would be revived on ABC after a two-year hiatus in March 2018.)
- April 8
  - An airman shoots and kills a squadron commander and then himself at Lackland Air Force Base in San Antonio, Texas.
  - Bernie Sanders accepts an invitation by Pope Francis to visit the Vatican, becoming the first American presidential candidate to receive such an invitation.
  - SpaceX successfully launches its Falcon 9 rocket from Cape Canaveral, Florida, on a NASA cargo run to the International Space Station, and lands its reusable main-stage booster on an autonomous spaceport drone ship.
- April 9 – The United States Air Force deploys B-52 bombers to Al Udeid Air Base in Doha, Qatar, to join the fight against the Islamic State in Iraq and Syria.
- April 11 – John Kerry becomes the first Secretary of State to visit the Hiroshima Peace Memorial Museum, where he and other Group of Seven (G7) members lay wreaths. Before Kerry's trip, Representative Nancy Pelosi (D-California)—then the Speaker of the House of Representatives—was the highest-ranking U.S. official to visit the memorial.
- April 12 – Two unarmed Russian Sukhoi Su-24 jets fly simulated attacks against the U.S. Navy destroyer Donald Cook in the Baltic Sea. Later, a Russian Kamov Ka-27 naval helicopter is seen making seven passes around the warship while taking pictures.
- April 13
  - Louisiana Governor John Bel Edwards signs an order banning discrimination against the LGBT community. The order reverses the policies of his predecessor, Bobby Jindal, who signed laws limiting same-sex marriage and the ability of transgender people to use the public restrooms of their choice.
  - The Centers for Disease Control and Prevention confirms that the Zika virus causes birth defects.
  - Kobe Bryant plays his final NBA game for the Los Angeles Lakers. Bryant, who played his entire 20-year career with the Lakers, sets a new points record for a final game, scoring 60 against the Utah Jazz.
  - The Golden State Warriors basketball team win their record 73rd regular season game. Surpassing the 1995-96 Chicago Bulls.
- April 14
  - The top pick for the WNBA draft is UConn's Breanna Stewart, followed by her teammates Moriah Jefferson and Morgan Tuck. This is the first time in any major North American sports draft that a single school produced the top three selections.
  - Microsoft files a lawsuit against the United States, stating that it has been prevented from disclosing information to its customers when the government obtains a warrant to read emails or access data through the cloud.
  - A Russian Sukhoi Su-27 fighter jet intercepts and threatens a U.S. Air Force Boeing RC-135 reconnaissance aircraft in international airspace over the Baltic Sea.
- April 18
  - 2016 Pulitzer Prizes: The Associated Press wins the Pulitzer Prize for Public Service, and the Los Angeles Times wins the Pulitzer for Breaking News Reporting. Lin-Manuel Miranda's Hamilton wins the Pulitzer Prize for Drama, and The Sympathizer by Viet Thanh Nguyen wins the Pulitzer Prize for Fiction.
  - Severe flooding in Houston, Texas, causes damage to 1,000 homes, leaves 147,000 residents without power, and kills eight people.
  - The 120th Boston Marathon is held with 30,000 runners. Ethiopian runners Lemi Berhanu Hayle and Atsede Baysa win the marathon.
- April 19 – The New York primary is held, with Donald Trump winning the Republican race and Hillary Clinton winning the Democratic race.
- April 20
  - Secretary of the Treasury Jack Lew announces that former slave and abolitionist Harriet Tubman will replace Andrew Jackson on the twenty-dollar bill.
  - Four people are killed when a small plane crashes in Anchorage, Alaska.
  - CIA programmer Joshua Schulte allegedly stole backup files from a program called Confluence prior to the program's hacking tools being leaked.
- April 21 – Music legend Prince dies at the age of 57. To celebrate his legacy, cities across the U.S. hold vigils and light buildings, bridges, and other venues in purple.
- April 22
  - Eight family members are shot to death at four locations in Pike County, Ohio. Three children survive the attacks.
  - Five people are killed in two separate shootings in Appling, Georgia.
- April 25
  - John Kasich and Ted Cruz announce that they will coordinate strategies to stop Donald Trump from winning the Republican presidential nomination: Kasich's campaign will ensure Cruz a "clear path" in Indiana, while Cruz's campaign will cut campaigning in New Mexico and Oregon.
  - A court settlement calls for the city of Cleveland, Ohio, to pay $6 million to the family of Tamir Rice, a 12-year-old boy who was shot and killed by two police officers in November 2014 after his toy gun was mistaken for a real one.
  - CRF Frozen Foods recalls more than 300 products.
- April 26 – Super Tuesday III: Donald Trump wins all five states holding Republican primaries (Connecticut, Delaware, Maryland, Pennsylvania, and Rhode Island). In the Democratic primaries, Hillary Clinton takes Connecticut, Delaware, Maryland, and Pennsylvania, while Bernie Sanders takes Rhode Island.
- April 27
  - The bodies of American climber Alex Lowe and photographer David Bridges, who were killed and buried during an avalanche in 1999, are discovered on the Himalayan mountain Shishapangma.
  - Dennis Hastert, a former Speaker of the House, is sentenced to 15 months in prison for breaking banking laws through the payment of "hush money" to victims whom he had sexually abused.
  - Ted Cruz announces that Carly Fiorina will be his running mate if he wins the Republican presidential nomination.
- April 28 – Comcast's NBCUniversal purchases DreamWorks Animation for $3.8 billion.
- April 29
  - The United States Air Force lands two F-22 Raptors in Lithuania for the first time in a show of support for Lithuania and surrounding countries, which have been worried over Russia's involvement in Ukraine.
  - China denies a Hong Kong port call from Carrier Strike Group 3, which includes the USS John C. Stennis and other escorting vessels.
  - The Centers for Disease Control and Prevention reports the first U.S.-related death from the Zika virus, an elderly man in Puerto Rico.
- April 30
  - President Obama attends his final White House Correspondents' Dinner, where comedian Larry Wilmore is the featured performer.
  - Six people are killed in a car crash on Interstate 95 in Jupiter, Florida.

=== May ===
- May 1
  - A cruise ship sets sail from Miami to Havana, Cuba, with more than 700 passengers on board, becoming the first in more than half a century to make the trip. The ship, Carnival Cruise Line's Adonia, was able to depart after a policy banning Cuban-born citizens from returning to the United States by sea was loosened. It docks in Havana on May 2.
  - May Day: Protesters in Seattle begin to riot and attack law enforcement, injuring five police officers. Nine people are arrested.
  - The Ringling Bros. and Barnum & Bailey Circus officially retires its elephants after a final show in Providence, Rhode Island.
  - The Serbian Orthodox Cathedral of St. Sava in New York City is almost destroyed in a four-alarm fire.
  - Fourteen of 175 cars of a CSX freight train derail in Washington, D.C., leaking three chemicals that are deemed hazardous to the public.
- May 2 – The Loud House premieres on Nickelodeon and becomes the number-one children's animated series on television within its first month on the air.
- May 3
  - A city bus is hijacked in Washington, D.C., and the suspect crashes it into a gas station, killing a pedestrian.
  - ISIL fighters ambush and kill Charles Keating IV, a Navy SEAL who was assisting Kurdish Peshmerga forces in the area. Keating is later identified as the grandson of financier Charles Keating Jr., who was known for his involvement in a 1980s savings and loan scandal. Arizona Governor Doug Ducey orders all state flags to be flown at half-staff on May 4.
  - The Indiana primary is held, and Donald Trump wins the Republican race.
  - Ted Cruz suspends his campaign for the Republican presidential nomination.
  - Three people are killed in a plane crash on Long Island.
- May 4
  - John Kasich suspends his presidential campaign, leaving Donald Trump the presumptive Republican nominee.
  - The Department of Justice informs North Carolina Governor Pat McCrory that a new state law limiting restroom access for transgender people violates the Civil Rights Act of 1964. It demands a response by May 9 on whether the state will correct the violations.
  - California raises the legal smoking age from 18 to 21 and restricts the use of electronic cigarettes in public places.
- May 5 – A warehouse burns down during a four-alarm fire in Houston.
- May 6
  - Three people are killed and three others injured during a two-day shooting spree in Potomac, Maryland. The suspect is believed to be a former police officer.
  - Captain America: Civil War, directed by the Russo brothers, is released by Marvel Studios as the 13th film of the Marvel Cinematic Universe (MCU), the first film of its "Phase Three" slate and the sequel to 2011's Captain America: The First Avenger and 2014's Captain America: The Winter Soldier. At release, it becomes the twelfth-highest-grossing film of all time (now the 22nd).
- May 7 – Nyquist, ridden by Mario Gutierrez, wins the Kentucky Derby.
- May 10
  - Three women are arrested at O'Hare International Airport in Chicago after being caught trying to smuggle 70 pounds ($3 million worth) of opium into the U.S.
  - The West Virginia primary is held, with Donald Trump winning the Republican race and Bernie Sanders winning the Democratic race. Trump wins the Republican primary in Nebraska.
  - NASA confirms the discovery of more than 1,284 exoplanets by its Kepler space observatory.
  - Four people are stabbed, two of them fatally, at a home and a shopping mall in Taunton, Massachusetts. The assailant is shot and killed by an off-duty sheriff.
- May 12
  - Susannah Mushatt Jones, the world's oldest person and the last surviving American born in the 1800s, dies in New York at age 116.
  - CBS cancels CSI: Cyber, the last active TV series in the CSI franchise.
- May 13
  - The Department of Education and Department of Justice advise public school districts across the country to allow transgender students to use bathrooms that match their gender identity, rather than the gender assigned to them at birth.
  - Michael Strahan makes his final appearance as co-host on Live! with Kelly and Michael.
- May 14
  - Eight people are killed and 44 others injured after a charter bus rolls over on Route 83 north of Laredo, Texas.
  - A pilot is killed when his stunt plane crashes during an air show at DeKalb-Peachtree Airport in DeKalb County, Georgia.
- May 20 – The Angry Birds Movie is released in theaters.
- May 21 – A U.S. airstrike kills Mullah Akhtar Mansour, leader of the Taliban in Afghanistan.
- May 22
  - A skydiving tour plane crashes in Hawaii, killing five people.
  - The U.S. lifts its embargo on arms trade in Vietnam.
- May 25 – An audit by the State Department Inspector General finds that Hillary Clinton violated directives from the department in her use of a private email server for government business during her time as Secretary of State. The Inspector General says that Clinton did not request approval to use the private server, and that such a request would have been denied because of security risks.
- May 27
  - President Obama becomes the first U.S. president to visit Hiroshima, Japan, where the United States dropped an atomic bomb in 1945.
  - A P-47 Thunderbolt crashes in the Hudson River, killing the pilot.
- May 28
  - Harambe, a 17-year-old, 440 lb male western lowland gorilla, is fatally shot by officials at the Cincinnati Zoo after a three-year-old boy falls into his enclosure.
- May 29 – 24-year-old rookie Alexander Rossi wins the 100th Indianapolis 500 mile race in front of a record crowd of 350,000. His car runs out of fuel coming to the finish line.
- May 30 – Former Stanford University student Brock Turner is sentenced to six months in prison for raping an unconscious woman behind a dumpster. The short sentence, as well as statements by Turner's parents in the following weeks, draw significant controversy.
- May 31 – Major flooding occurs in Texas and Oklahoma.

=== June ===
- June 1 – A gunman opens fire at the University of California, Los Angeles, killing an associate professor and his wife in an apparent murder–suicide.
- June 3 – American boxing legend and conscientious objector Muhammad Ali dies of septic shock at a hospital in Scottsdale, Arizona, at the age of 74.
- June 7 – The final major state primaries are held for the 2016 presidential election, with Hillary Clinton and Donald Trump emerging as the presumptive nominees for the Democratic and Republican races, respectively.
- June 10
  - President Barack Obama formally endorses Hillary Clinton for the Democratic presidential nomination.
  - 22-year-old singer–songwriter Christina Grimmie is shot dead while signing autographs at a concert venue in Orlando, Florida.
- June 12
  - 29-year-old Omar Mateen opens fire at Pulse, a gay dance club in Orlando, killing 49 people and leaving another 53 wounded. The attack surpassed the 2007 Virginia Tech shootings as the deadliest mass shooting in U.S. history until the 2017 Las Vegas shooting. The shooting is investigated as a domestic terrorist attack.
  - The 70th annual Tony Awards are presented, the cultural icon musical Hamilton wins 11 awards including Best Musical from a record 16 nominations. The performance of the cast of Hamilton was introduced by a filmed message from President and First Lady Obama and Chance the Rapper calling the show "one of the greatest pieces of art ever made."
  - In the NHL, the Eastern Conference champion Pittsburgh Penguins defeat the Western Conference champion San Jose Sharks in six games to win the Stanley Cup, the Penguins' fourth championship in franchise history.
- June 13 – Lightning Rod, the world's first launched wooden roller coaster, opens at the Dollywood amusement park in Pigeon Forge, Tennessee, United States.
- June 15–16 – In response to the attack in Orlando, Senator Chris Murphy (D-Connecticut) holds a filibuster for nearly fifteen hours, demanding new gun control laws from Congress. The filibuster ends when the Senate agrees to vote on two measures: one that would require universal background checks for gun sales, and another that would ban the sale of weapons to individuals on government watch lists of suspected terrorists.
- June 17 – Pixar Animation Studios' 17th feature film, Finding Dory, the sequel to 2003's Finding Nemo, is released in theaters.
- June 18 – A 19-year-old man is arrested after attempting to pull a gun from a policeman's holster at a Donald Trump rally in Las Vegas. He later admits he was planning to use it to kill Trump.
- June 19 – In the NBA, the Eastern Conference champion Cleveland Cavaliers defeat the Western Conference champion Golden State Warriors in seven games to win their first NBA Finals title in the Cavaliers' 45-year history. It is the first major professional sports championship won by a team based in Cleveland since 1964.
- June 22–23 – Members of the House Democratic Caucus, led by Representative John Lewis (D-Georgia) and Representative Katherine Clark (D-Massachusetts), declare their intention to remain on the floor of the House of Representatives until its Republican Speaker, Paul Ryan, allows votes on gun control legislation in the aftermath of the Orlando nightclub shooting. The sit-in is staged by about 60 legislators.
- June 24 – At least 23 people are killed after a huge flood hits areas of West Virginia.
- June 25 – Dylan Mark Noble, a 19-year-old unarmed white man with suicidal thoughts was fatally shot by Fresno police after shouting that he hates his life, and his death sparked massive outrage with multiple protests across both Fresno and the metropolitan area.
- June 26 – Ten people are hospitalized, five with stab wounds, after a group of counter-protesters attack a white supremacist gathering in Sacramento, California.
- June 27 – In a 5–3 decision, the Supreme Court strikes down a 2013 Texas law that imposed restrictions on abortion clinics.
- June 28 – Pat Summitt the all-time winningest women's basketball coach in NCAA history dies of dementia at the age of 64, in Summit's 38-year coaching career with Tennessee she won 1,098 games the most of any men's or women's coach.

=== July ===
- July 1
  - The U.S. military officially lifts its ban on transgender people serving openly in the armed forces.
  - Attorney General Loretta Lynch announces that she will leave it up to the FBI to decide whether to bring charges against Hillary Clinton for her use of a private email server as Secretary of State.
  - Vermont's GMO labeling law goes into effect—the first in the U.S.
- July 3 – The Fort Bragg Game becomes the first professional sporting event to ever be held on an active military base, and the first Major League Baseball regular season game ever held in the state of North Carolina when the Miami Marlins play the Atlanta Braves.
- July 4 – Juno successfully enters the orbit of Jupiter.
- July 5
  - Gypsy Rose Blanchard pleads guilty of the murder of her mother Dee Dee Blanchard who had abused her for many years, forcing her to use a wheelchair and to pretend to be ill. She is sentenced to 10 years in prison.
  - Multiple cellphone video recordings capture the police shooting of Alton Sterling, a man selling CDs outside a convenience store in Baton Rouge, Louisiana, sparking wide outrage. The Department of Justice opens a federal investigation.
- July 6
  - After FBI Director James Comey recommends against indicting Hillary Clinton, Attorney General Loretta Lynch announces that the federal investigation of Clinton will be closed with no charges.
  - A police officer shoots and kills 32-year-old Philando Castile during a routine traffic stop in Falcon Heights, Minnesota, sparking further public outcry and protests regarding police brutality. Minnesota Governor Mark Dayton requests an investigation by the Justice Department.
- July 7 – During a Black Lives Matter protest in Dallas, Texas, a sniper later identified as Micah Xavier Johnson opens fire, killing five Dallas police officers and injuring another eleven people in the deadliest incident for U.S. law enforcement since September 11, 2001. Johnson is later found to have targeted white people (specifically white police officers) and to have been interested in several black nationalist groups. He is killed by a C-4 bomb delivered by a robot, the first use of lethal force by a robot by an American police department.
- July 8 – Despite the conclusions of the FBI and attorney general, the State Department reopens its investigation into Hillary Clinton's use of a private email server.
- July 9 – The government of the Bahamas releases a rare advisory to Bahamian citizens traveling to the United States to be non-confrontational and cooperative with police after recent racial tensions in the country.
- July 16 – Donald Trump announces Indiana Governor Mike Pence as his running mate for the Republican ticket in the 2016 presidential election.
- July 17 – Three police officers are shot dead and three others are injured in Baton Rouge, Louisiana. The shooter has been killed and an investigation is underway.
- July 18–21 – The Republican National convention is held in Cleveland, Ohio with Donald Trump accepting the nomination.
- July 22 – Hillary Clinton announces Virginia United States Senator Tim Kaine as her running mate for the Democrat ticket in the 2016 presidential election.
- July 25–28 – The Democratic National Convention is held in Philadelphia, Pennsylvania with Hillary Clinton accepting the nomination. She becomes the first woman to accept the nomination of a major party for president.
- July 30
  - All 16 occupants of a hot air balloon are killed – the deadliest incident of its kind in U.S. history – after hitting power lines and crashing near Austin, Texas.
  - Skydiver Luke Aikins sets a new world record for the highest altitude jump without a parachute, falling 25,000 ft into a safety net.
- July 31
  - The 2016 Maryland flood in Ellicott City, Maryland, caused significant damage to the historic downtown area of the municipality
  - Sharknado: The 4th Awakens airs for the first time on Syfy.

=== August ===
- August 2 – A charter bus crashes on Highway 99 in Merced County, California, killing four people.
- August 4 – A wildfire occurs in California, Montana, Nevada, Oregon, Washington and Wyoming.
- August 5 – Suicide Squad, directed by David Ayer, is released as the third film in the DC Extended Universe.
- August 5–21 – The United States compete at the Summer Olympics in Rio de Janeiro, Brazil and win 46 gold, 37 silver, and 38 bronze medals.
- August 7 – Caleb Schwab, the 10-year-old son of Kansas state representative Scott Schwab, is killed while riding Verrückt—the world's tallest water slide—at the Schlitterbahn Water Park in Kansas City, Kansas.
- August 8 – A power outage causes hundreds of Delta Air Lines flights to be delayed or cancelled.
- August 10 – Police in Dallas, Texas kill Tony Timpa, who had schizophrenia and depression, after he asked for help. The police laughed as he asked for help 30 times while they pinned his shoulders, knees, and neck to the ground.
- August 12–19 – The 2016 Louisiana floods submerge over 146,000 homes across south Louisiana, killing 13 people. The Red Cross characterized the floods as the worst natural disaster in the U.S. since Hurricane Sandy in 2012 and President Obama visited the Baton Rouge area to survey the damage.
- August 16 – The Blue Cut Fire occurs in California, displacing more than 82,000 residents, burning over 37,000 acres (150 km^{2}) and threatening at least 34,500 structures.
- August 17–21 – The 74th World Science Fiction Convention is held at the Bartle Hall Convention Center in Kansas City, Missouri.
- August 20 – The U.S. Air Force deploys the B-1, B-2, and B-52 bombers in Guam to conduct exercises.
- August 26 – Barack Obama expands the Papahānaumokuākea Marine National Monument, making it the world's largest marine protected area in the United States. Barack Obama surpasses Theodore Roosevelt as the most water and land protected by a U.S. president.
- August 31 – The US conducts its first commercial flight to Cuba in 50 years

=== September ===
- September 6 – The Federal Bureau of Investigation arrests Israeli rabbi Aharon Goldberg and divorce mediator Shimen Liebowitz, two planners of a contract killing on an estranged Jewish man, at a hotel in Central Valley, New York.
- September 10 – John Hinckley Jr., the man who tried to assassinate US President Ronald Reagan in 1981, is released from a psychiatric hospital after 35 years.
- September 11
  - Hillary Clinton becomes overheated and faints at a 9/11 memorial service in New York City, and is later revealed to have been diagnosed with pneumonia in the days prior.
  - Savvy Shields, Miss Arkansas 2016, wins the 90th Miss America pageant.
- September 16 – Michael Blackmore, a police officer with the police department in Columbia, South Carolina, rescues a man attempting to commit suicide.
- September 17
  - A pipe bomb explodes near a U.S. Marine Corps charity 5K run in Seaside Park, New Jersey. This is followed by an explosion in New York City that injures 29.
  - A man dressed in a private security company uniform stabs and wounds nine people in a St. Cloud, Minnesota mall before being shot and killed by an off-duty police officer.
- September 18
  - Following explosions in Seaside Park, New Jersey, and Manhattan, New York, on the previous day, another explosive device was discovered at a transit station in Elizabeth. The device was accidentally detonated in the early hours of September 19 when operated on by a bomb squad robot.
  - The 68th Primetime Emmy Awards are held at the Microsoft Theater in Los Angeles, California, with Game of Thrones winning the best drama and Veep winning the best comedy.
- September 19 – Ahmad Khan Rahami is identified as a suspect for the bombings in New York and New Jersey the previous two days. He is captured in a shootout.
- September 21 – A state of emergency is declared in Charlotte, North Carolina, after protests over the police killings of three black men in a single week.
- September 23 – A gunman opens fire at a mall in Burlington, Washington, killing 5 people. The shooter, Arcan Cetin, is arrested the next day.
- September 24 – The National Museum of African-American History and Culture, the biggest museum towards black history, opens in Washington D.C.
- September 26 – Presidential candidates Donald Trump and Hillary Clinton take part in their first live televised debate, with an estimated audience of up to 100 million viewers.
- September 28 – Congress votes to override President Obama's veto of the Justice Against Sponsors of Terrorism Act, which would effectively allow the families of victims of the September 11 attacks to sue the Kingdom of Saudi Arabia for their part in the attacks.
- September 29 – A commuter train crashes in Hoboken, New Jersey, killing one person and injuring 114 others.

=== October ===
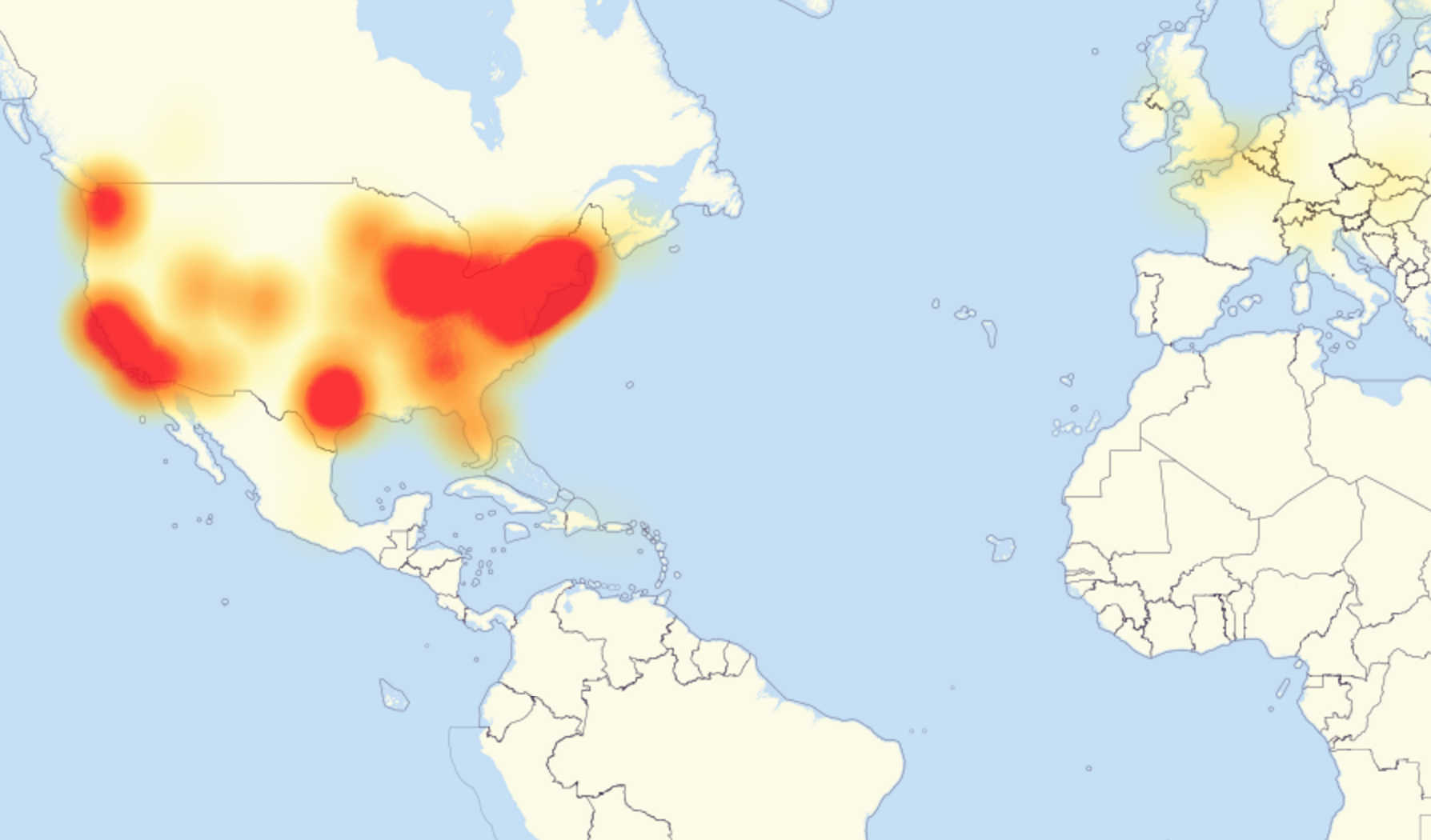
October 21: The Dyn cyberattack

- October 1
  - The New York Times publishes parts of Donald Trump's 1995 tax records, which show that he suffered a $916 million loss during that year, which would have given him the ability to avoid paying income taxes for up to 18 years. This occurs while Trump is under intense scrutiny by Hillary Clinton and other political opponents to release his current tax records as is tradition in modern presidential elections.
  - The Alabama Court of the Judiciary formally suspends Chief Justice of the Alabama Supreme Court Roy Moore until the end of his term for directing probate judges to enforce the state's ban on same-sex marriage, which had been ruled unconstitutional in federal court.
- October 4 – Tim Kaine and Mike Pence participate in the vice presidential debate at Longwood University.
- October 6 – Hurricane Matthew strengthens to a Category Four storm as it approaches Florida.
- October 7
  - The Obama administration accuses the government of Russia of hacking the computer network of the Democratic National Committee.
  - The Washington Post releases a 2005 videotape of Donald Trump making lewd comments to Access Hollywood host Billy Bush about a married woman and commenting on how he can grab women "by the pussy" without repercussions because he is "a star". The comments are met with reactions of disgust and disbelief from the media and mainstream Republicans, as well as numerous Republicans rescinding their endorsements of his campaign. Speaker of the House Paul Ryan disinvites Trump from a Wisconsin campaign event in response. Trump issues an apology video online shortly after.
- October 9 – Martha Raddatz and Anderson Cooper host the second presidential debate at Washington University in St. Louis.
- October 10 – Samsung announces an official discontinuation of the Samsung Galaxy Note 7 smartphone after reports of the phone overheating and combusting, posing a severe health risk.
- October 11 – President Obama presents details of a human mission to the planet Mars.
- October 15 – A firebomb is set off inside the Republican Party headquarters building in Orange County, North Carolina. No injuries are reported and a suspect has not been found.
- October 19 – Chris Wallace hosts the final presidential debate at the University of Nevada, Las Vegas.
- October 21 – A currently unknown attacker launches multiple distributed denial-of-service (DDos) attacks on networks operated by DNS provider Dyn, making numerous sites difficult or impossible to access for a period of time, including Twitter, Reddit, Netflix, Spotify, The New York Times, BBC News, and PayPal. The Department of Homeland Security opens an investigation.
- October 27 – Seven defendants, including Ammon and Ryan Bundy, are acquitted of all federal charges by a federal jury in relation to their occupation of the Malheur National Wildlife Refuge in January.
- October 28
  - FBI Director James Comey informs Congress that the bureau has chosen to reopen its investigation into Democratic presidential nominee Hillary Clinton's use of a private email server after discovering some emails that, while not from Clinton herself or withheld during the investigation, may be "pertinent" to the investigation. The emails were discovered on a device belonging to Anthony Weiner during an investigation into one of his sexting scandals.
  - 36-year-old Ryan Collins is sentenced to 18 months in prison after pleading guilty to the 2014 hacking and distributing of numerous celebrities' nude photos.

=== November ===
- November 2 – Major League Baseball: In Game 7 of the World Series, the Chicago Cubs defeat the Cleveland Indians 8–7 in 10 innings, winning the Series 4–3 and claiming their first MLB title since 1908.
- November 4 – Doctor Strange, directed by Scott Derrickson, is released by Marvel Studios as the 14th film of the Marvel Cinematic Universe (MCU).
- November 6 – In a second letter to Congress, FBI Director James Comey announces that the newest investigation of emails related to Hillary Clinton's use of a private server had not changed the conclusion the FBI reached in July.

November 8: Donald Trump is elected president

- November 8
  - The 2016 presidential election is held. Donald Trump is elected as the 45th president of the United States and Mike Pence is elected the 48th vice president, with Trump becoming the oldest man elected president at the age of 70 as well as the first president in history to take the office without any prior political or military experience. The win is considered one of the most shocking upsets in U.S. history, with most news outlets and experts considering a Trump victory unlikely. The result is also highly controversial due to Hillary Clinton's popular vote lead of nearly 3 million votes over Trump, who won via the Electoral College.
  - Four states – California, Nevada, Maine and Massachusetts – vote to legalize the use, sale, and consumption of recreational marijuana.
  - Faith Spotted Eagle becomes the first Native American to receive an electoral vote.
  - The U.S. senate elects the most diverse cast yet. Catherine Cortez Masto becomes the first Latina senator, Kamala Harris becomes the first Asian-American, and the second black woman into the senate, and Ilhan Omar becomes the first Somali-American lawmaker.
  - In the 2016 Senate and House elections, the Republican Party maintains its majority of seats in Congress.
- November 9 – Anti-Trump protests are held in several cities across the nation over the next week after Trump's election win.
- November 10 – John Kerry makes a trip to Antarctica, becoming the first Secretary of State to visit all seven continents.
- November 18 – Donald Trump agrees to pay a $25 million settlement to two class action lawsuits and a New York state civil lawsuit regarding his now defunct unlicensed Trump University.
- November 20 – More than 300 people are injured, 26 seriously, after police use water cannons, tear gas, rubber bullets, and concussion grenades on a peaceful protest against the proposed construction of the Dakota Access Pipeline on the Standing Rock Indian Reservation.
- November 21 – A school bus crashes in Chattanooga, Tennessee, killing at least six children and injuring another 22.
- November 25
  - The state elections commission of Wisconsin agrees to a statewide recount of its ballots in the 2016 presidential election after requests by Green Party candidate Jill Stein and independent candidate Rocky De La Fuente.
  - After multiple hearings, Dylann Roof, the suspected perpetrator of the 2015 Charleston church shooting, is declared by federal judge Richard Gergel to be mentally competent enough to stand trial.
- November 28 – Eleven people are hospitalized with injuries after 18-year-old Abdul Razak Ali Artan attacks students on the campus of Ohio State University with his car and a butcher knife before being fatally shot by police. An investigation later shows that Artan was inspired by terrorist propaganda from the Islamic State of Iraq and the Levant and radical Muslim cleric Anwar al-Awlaki.

=== December ===
- December 2
  - Donald Trump becomes the first US president or president-elect since 1979 to make direct contact with the president of Taiwan, upsetting Chinese diplomats and sparking concern over whether Trump will uphold the "One China policy" at the foundation of China-U.S. relations.
  - A fire at an Oakland, California warehouse, which was hosting a music event, kills at least 36 people, the deadliest fire in Oakland history.
- December 4
  - The United States Army Corps of Engineers under the Obama administration denies the easement of the Dakota Access Pipeline through Lake Oahe in the Standing Rock Indian Reservation and will look for alternative routes.
  - A man from Salisbury, North Carolina briefly opens fire with an AR-15 style rifle inside Comet Ping Pong, a pizzeria in Washington, D.C., wishing to "self-investigate" the establishment implicated in a false conspiracy theory that claims the restaurant is used by members of the Democratic Party for a child-sex ring. No injuries are reported, and the man is arrested without incident and immediately charged with assault with a dangerous weapon.
- December 5 – The murder trial of white police officer Michael Slager in the 2015 shooting death of Walter Scott in South Carolina ends in a mistrial after a hung jury cannot reach a verdict, resulting in no charges on Slager.
- December 8 – John Glenn, former astronaut, Colonel, and Senator, and the first American to orbit the Earth, dies of presently undisclosed conditions at the OSU Wexner Medical Center in Columbus, Ohio, at the age of 95.
- December 9
  - The CIA tells U.S. legislators that the United States Intelligence Community has "high confidence" that Russia conducted operations during the 2016 presidential election to assist Donald Trump in winning the presidency. Intelligence agencies have concluded that the Kremlin had orchestrated the Democratic National Committee cyber attacks. Both Democrats and Republicans in Congress call for a full-scale investigation. Trump writes off the report as "ridiculous".
  - The Supreme Court of Michigan rejects Jill Stein's request for a recount of votes in the state, upholding Donald Trump's victory in the state.
- December 12
  - After the recount is completed in Wisconsin and Pennsylvania rejects Jill Stein's request, both states reaffirm Donald Trump as winner of the states in the 2016 election.
  - Block Island Wind Farm becomes the first commercial offshore wind farm in the United States.
- December 14
  - Yahoo discloses that a data breach in 2013 compromised more than 1 billion user accounts' information, such as names, passwords, and unencrypted messages, making it the largest data breach in the history of the Internet. Yahoo already disclosed a smaller 2014 data breach in September 2016.
  - The Federal Reserve raises its benchmark interest rate by 0.25%, only the second increase in a decade, citing strong economic growth and rising employment, though Chairwoman Janet Yellen says the outlook for the US economy going forward is "uncertain".
- December 16 – Rogue One: A Star Wars Story is released in theaters.
- December 19
  - The Electoral College elects Donald Trump as the next president of the United States, with 304 electoral votes cast for Trump versus 227 for Hillary Clinton.
  - North Carolina Governor-elect Roy Cooper announces that the controversial HB2 law passed in March limiting the rights of the LGBT community will be repealed.
- December 20 – President Obama, in a joint agreement with Prime Minister of Canada Justin Trudeau, permanently bans oil and gas drilling in most of the Arctic and Atlantic Ocean.
- December 23 – In a departure from its previous policy, the Obama administration chooses to not use its veto power and instead abstains from voting on United Nations Security Council Resolution 2334, allowing its passage. The resolution demands an end to the construction of Israeli settlements in the West Bank and East Jerusalem. Both Israeli Prime Minister Benjamin Netanyahu and President-elect Donald Trump imply that the decision will result in a reassessment of relations with the United Nations.
- December 24 – Donald Trump announces that he will be dissolving his foundation to avoid potential conflicts of interest in his presidency. New York Attorney General Eric Schneiderman asserts that Trump will not be able to do so until an ongoing investigation into the foundation has completed.
- December 27 – Carrie Fisher, known for playing the iconic character Princess Leia in the Star Wars film series, as well as being a noted script doctor and mental health advocate, dies at the age of 60 after having a cardiac arrest on a transatlantic flight four days earlier. Her mother, actress Debbie Reynolds dies the next day, after having a stroke while preparing for Fisher's funeral.
- December 29 – The Obama administration imposes sanctions against the leaders of the Russian intelligence agency GRU and expels 35 Russian operatives from the United States in response to Russia's interference in the 2016 presidential election. President-elect Donald Trump urges the country "move on" from the issue, but nonetheless announces that he will be meeting with the United States Intelligence Community for an update on the situation.
- December 31 – Federal judge Reed O'Connor in Texas blocks the enforcement of a policy seeking to extend Affordable Care Act anti-discrimination protections for transgender health and abortion-related services.
- December 31 – United States troops withdraw from Afghanistan, leaving behind 8,400 troops stationed at 4 garrisons (Kabul, Kandahar, Bagram, and Jalalabad).

== Deaths ==
=== January ===
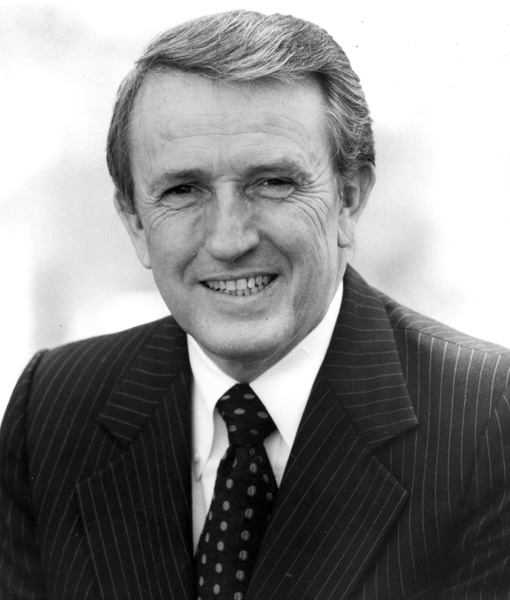
Dale Bumpers

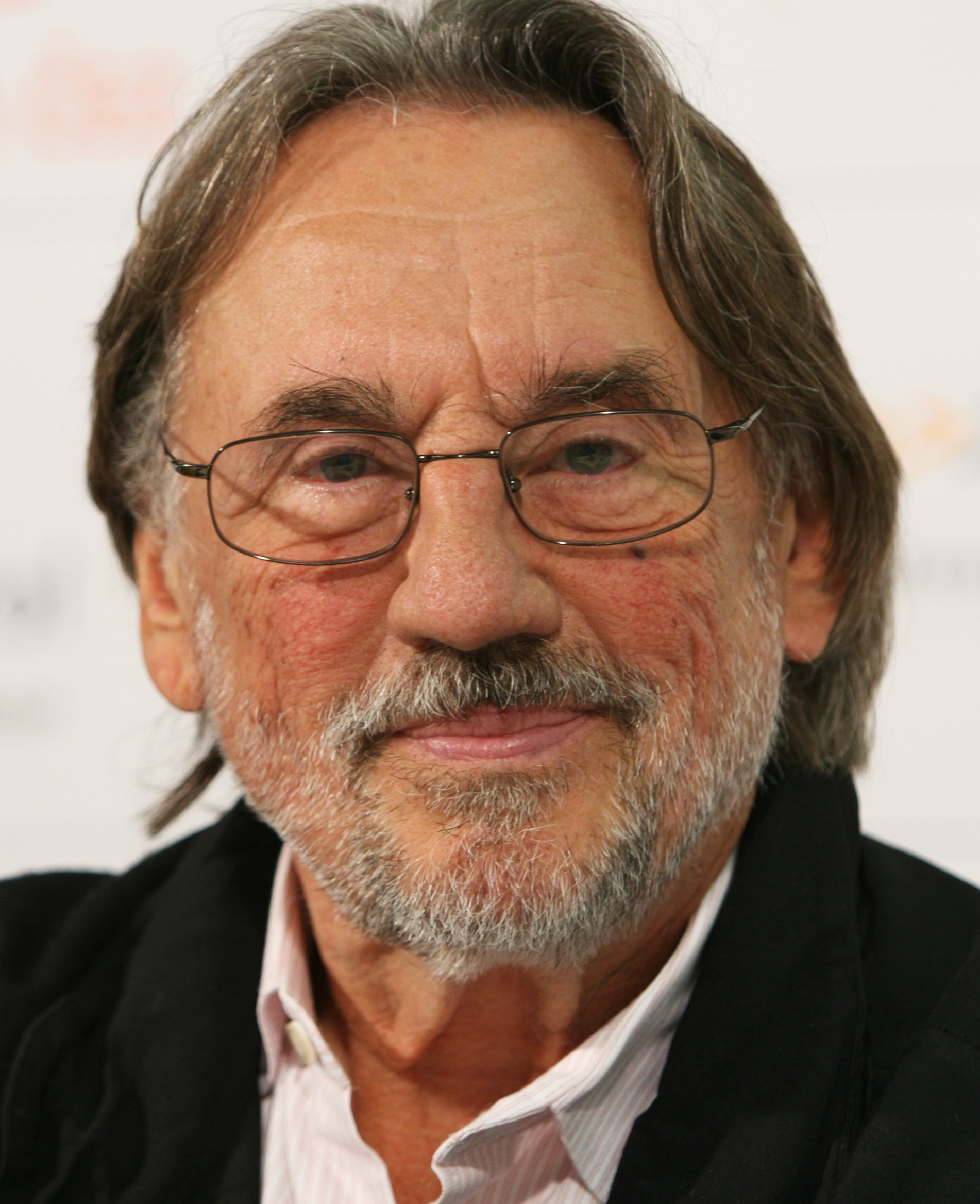
Vilmos Zsigmond

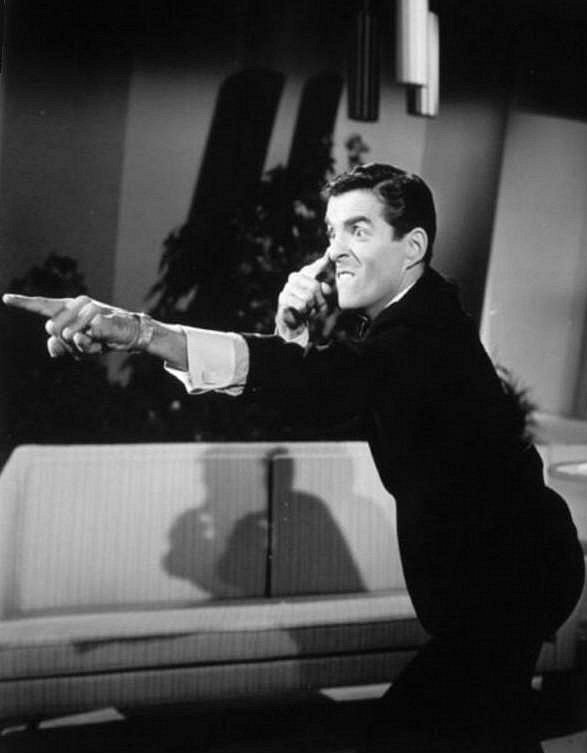
Pat Harrington Jr.

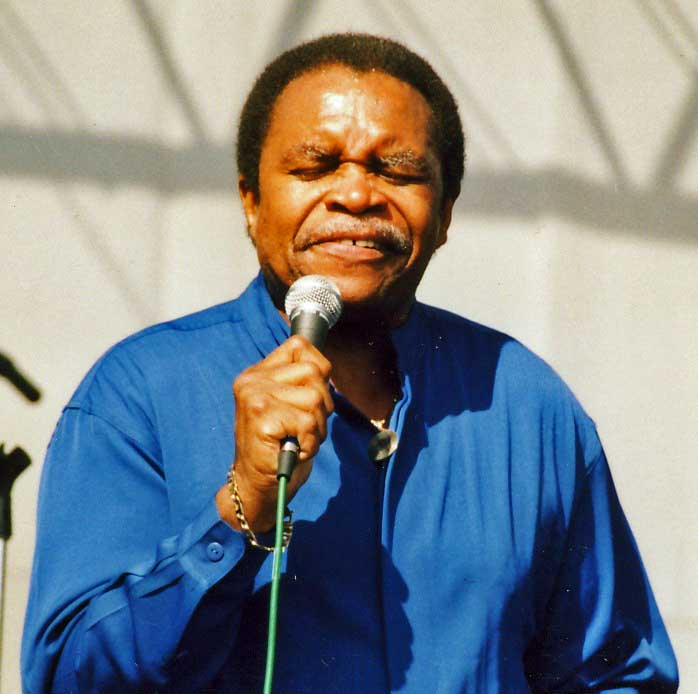
Otis Clay

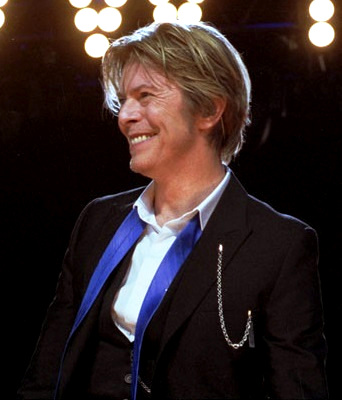
David Bowie

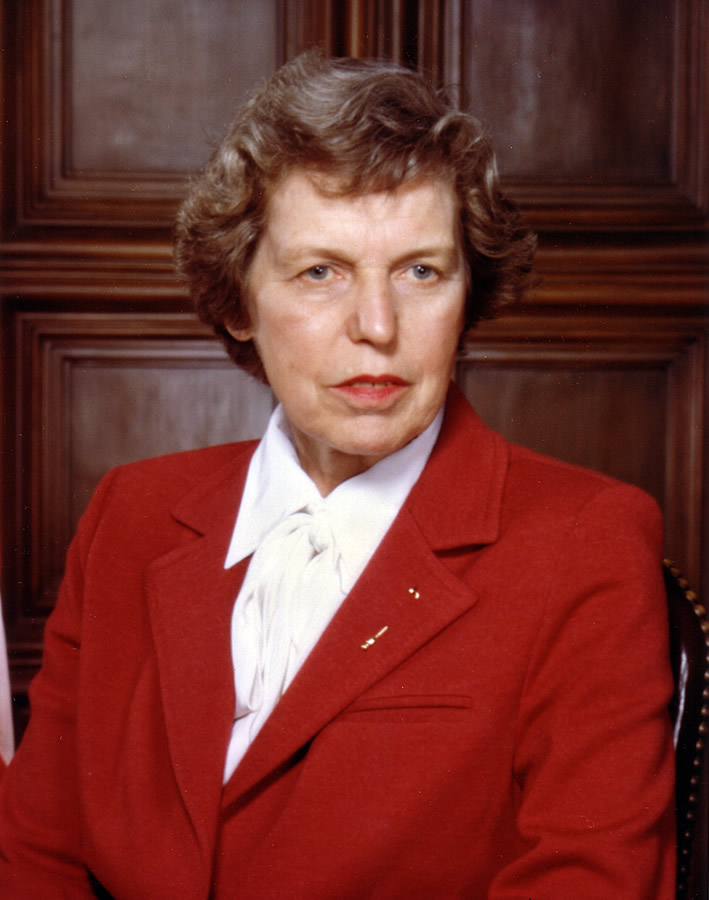
Ann Z. Caracristi

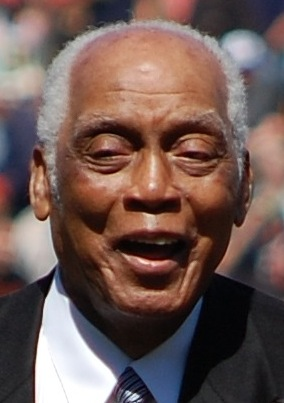
Monte Irvin

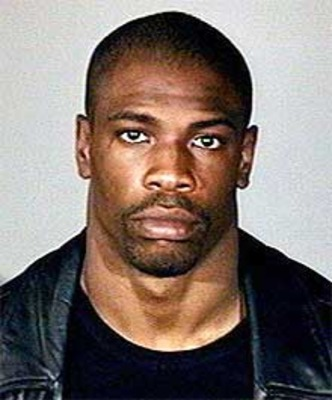
Lawrence Phillips

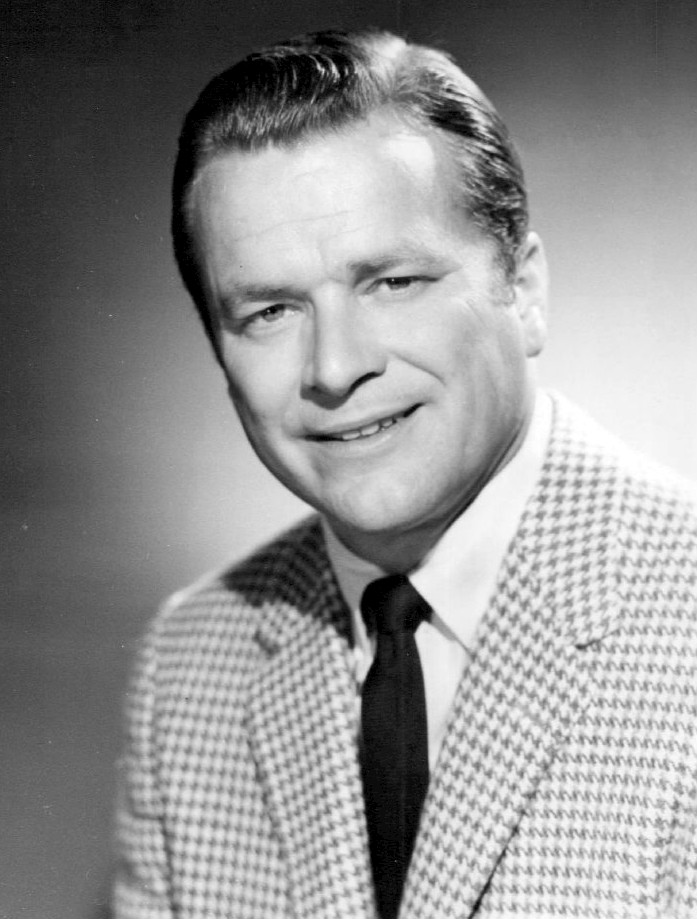
Jim Simpson

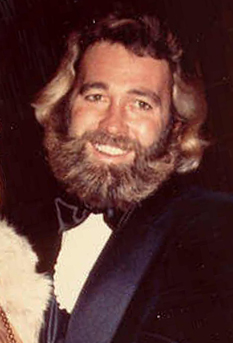
Dan Haggerty

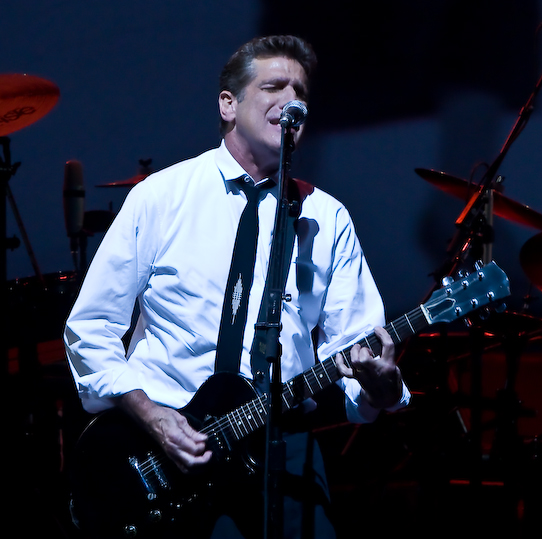
Glenn Frey

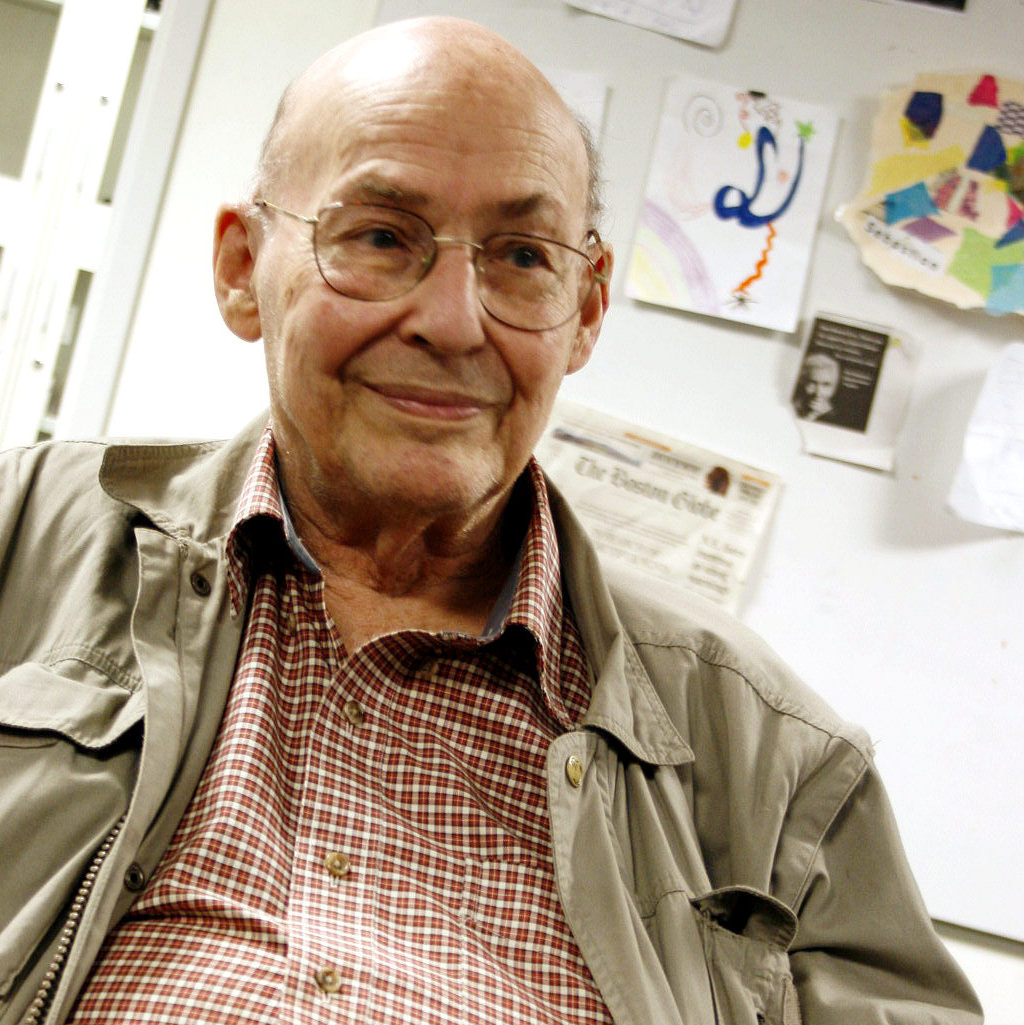
Marvin Minsky

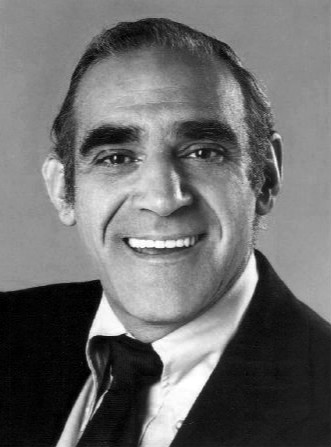
Abe Vigoda

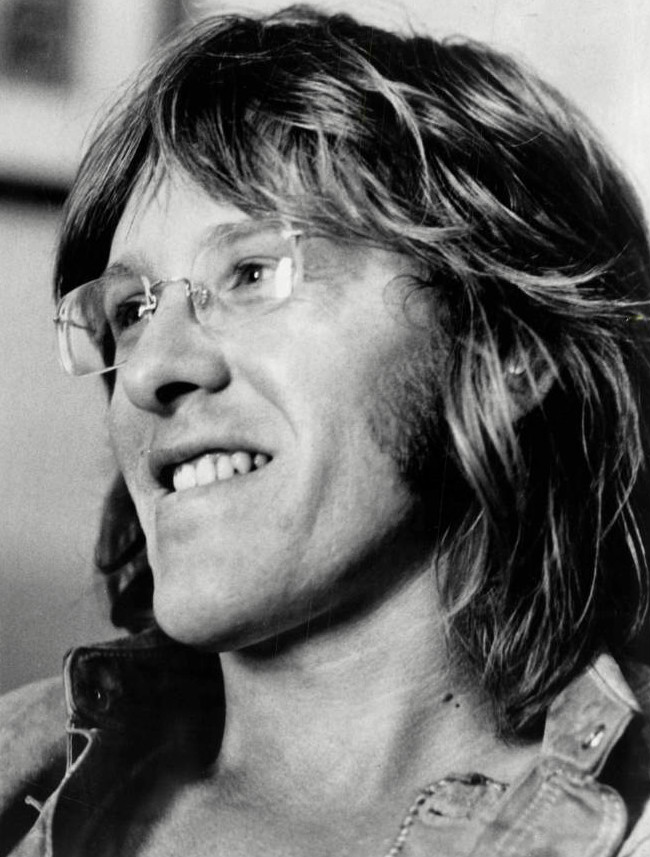
Paul Kantner

- January 1
  - Lennie Bluett, actor (born 1919)
  - Dale Bumpers, politician; 38th Governor of Arkansas and U.S. Senator (1975–1999) (born 1925)
  - Gilbert Kaplan, businessman, publisher, and amateur conductor (born 1941)
  - Tony Lane, graphic designer (born 1944)
  - John Coleman Moore, mathematician (born 1923)
  - Mike Oxley, politician (born 1944)
  - Vilmos Zsigmond, Hungarian-born cinematographer (born 1930)
- January 2
  - Brad Fuller, video game composer and audio engineer (born 1953)
  - Stanley Siegel, radio reporter and talk show host (born 1936)
  - Frances Cress Welsing, psychiatrist and author (born 1935)
- January 3
  - Leonard Berkowitz, social psychologist (born 1926)
  - Gary Flakne, politician (born 1934)
  - John McDade Howell, university chancellor (born 1922)
  - Raymond W. Lessard, Roman Catholic prelate (born 1930)
  - Andy Maurer, football player (born 1948)
  - Ted Stanley, entrepreneur and philanthropist (born 1931)
- January 4
  - Robert Balser, animator (born 1927)
  - Stephen W. Bosworth, diplomat; U.S. Ambassador to South Korea (1997–2001) (born 1939)
  - Long John Hunter, blues musician (born 1931)
  - Red Parker, football coach (born 1931)
  - Joseph Ritz, author, playwright, and journalist (born 1929)
  - Leo Rucka, football player (born 1931)
- January 5
  - Bob Armstrong, basketball player (born 1933)
  - Nicholas Caldwell, R&B singer and musician (born 1944)
  - Christine Lawrence Finney, animator and painter (born 1968)
  - George MacIntyre, football player and coach (born 1939)
  - Jay Ritchie, baseball player (born 1936)
- January 6
  - Robert D. Acland, surgeon (born 1941)
  - Douglas Greer, child actor (born 1921)
  - Pat Harrington Jr., actor (born 1929)
  - Florence King, writer (born 1936)
  - Serena Sinclair Lesley, journalist (born 1926)
  - Sol Polansky, diplomat (born 1926)
  - Robert D. Timm, businessman and politician (born 1921)
- January 7
  - Bill Foster, basketball coach (born 1929)
  - John Johnson, basketball player (born 1947)
  - Kitty Kallen, singer (born 1921)
  - Richard Libertini, actor (born 1933)
  - Troy Shondell, singer (born 1939)
- January 8
  - Otis Clay, R&B and soul singer (born 1942)
  - Royal Parker, television personality (born 1929)
  - Red Simpson, singer and songwriter (born 1934)
  - Brett Smiley, singer and songwriter (born 1955)
- January 9
  - Barbara Allyne Bennet, actress and union executive (born 1939)
  - Myra Carter, actress (born 1929)
  - Lawrence H. Cohn, cardiac surgeon (born 1937)
  - Lance Rautzhan, baseball player (born 1952)
  - Angus Scrimm, actor and author (born 1926)
  - Beau St. Clair, film producer (born 1952)
  - Peggy Willis-Aarnio, ballet choreographer and historian (born 1948)
- January 10
  - David Bowie, English singer, songwriter and actor (b. 1947)
  - Alton Brown, baseball player (born 1925)
  - Ann Z. Caracristi, cryptanalyst and intelligence official (born 1921)
  - Charles Congden Carpenter, naturalist and herpetologist (born 1921)
  - Jeanne Córdova, German-born American LGBT activist and writer (born 1948)
  - Carolyn Denning, pediatrician (born 1927)
  - Michael Galeota, actor (born 1984)
  - Ralph Hauenstein, business and philanthropist (born 1912)
  - Francis Thomas Hurley, Roman Catholic prelate (born 1927)
  - Arthur S. Obermayer, entrepreneur and philanthropist (born 1931)
  - Dick Spady, restaurateur (born 1923)
- January 11
  - Monte Irvin, baseball player (born 1919)
  - David Margulies, actor (born 1937)
  - Don Strauch, politician; Mayor of Mesa, Arizona (born 1926)
- January 12
  - Meg Mundy, British-born American actress and model (born 1915)
  - Andrew Smith, basketball player (born 1990)
- January 13
  - Luis Arroyo, baseball player (born 1927)
  - Brian Bedford, English actor (born 1935)
  - Lawrence Phillips, football player (born 1975)
  - Jim Simpson, sportscaster (born 1927)
  - Tera Wray, pornographic actress (born 1982)
- January 14
  - George Carroll, American lawyer and politician (b. 1921)
  - James Hannah, American attorney (b. 1944)
  - Al Hart, American radio host (b. 1927)
  - Ellen Meiksins Wood, American historian (b. 1942)
- January 15
  - Noreen Corcoran, actress and dancer (born 1943)
  - Dan Haggerty, actor (born 1942)
- January 16
  - Bob Harkey, race car driver (born 1930)
  - Gary Loizzo, singer and musician (born 1945)
  - Ted Marchibroda, football player and coach (born 1931)
  - Lloyd Rudolph, political scientist and author (born 1927)
- January 17
  - Blowfly, musician and producer (born 1939)
  - Mic Gillette, brass player (born 1951)
  - Ramblin' Lou Schriver, musician and broadcaster (born 1929)
- January 18 – Glenn Frey, singer-songwriter and musician (born 1948)
- January 19
  - Richard Levins, mathematical ecologist (born 1930)
  - Forrest McDonald, historian (born 1927)
  - William Y. Smith, general (born 1925)
  - Frank Sullivan, baseball player (born 1930)
- January 20
  - Ronald Greenwald, rabbi and businessman (born 1934)
  - David G. Hartwell, editor, literary critic and publisher (born 1941)
  - Edward Yourdon, software engineer, computer consultant, author and lecturer (born 1944)
- January 21
  - Bill Johnson, alpine skier (born 1960)
  - Derrick Todd Lee, serial killer (born 1968)
- January 22
  - Tom Aidala, American architect (b. 1933)
  - Eugene Borowitz, American rabbi and philosopher (b. 1924)
  - Fred Bruney, American football player (b. 1931)
  - Pete Carmichael, American football coach (b. 1941)
  - Waymond C. Huggins, American politician (b. 1927)
  - Mikhail Odnoralov, Russian-born American painter (b. 1944)
  - Robert Pickus, American activist (b. 1923)
  - Sarah, American zoo cheetah (b. 2000)
  - Storm Flag Flying, American thoroughbred racehorse (b. 1999)
  - Rik Wilson, American ice hockey player (b. 1962)
- January 23 – Marie Mahoney, baseball player (born 1924)
- January 24 – Marvin Minsky, computer scientist (born 1927)
- January 25
  - Thornton Dial, artist (born 1928)
  - Concepcion Picciotto, Spanish-born peace and social activist (born 1936)
- January 26
  - Tommy Kelly, actor (born 1925)
  - Abe Vigoda, actor (born 1921)
- January 27 – Barbara Berger, baseball player (born 1930)
- January 28
  - Signe Toly Anderson, singer (born 1941)
  - Buddy Cianci, politician; 32nd and 34th Mayor of Providence, Rhode Island (born 1941)
  - Paul Kantner, singer and musician (born 1941)
- January 30 – Georgia Davis Powers, civil rights activist and politician (born 1923)

=== February ===
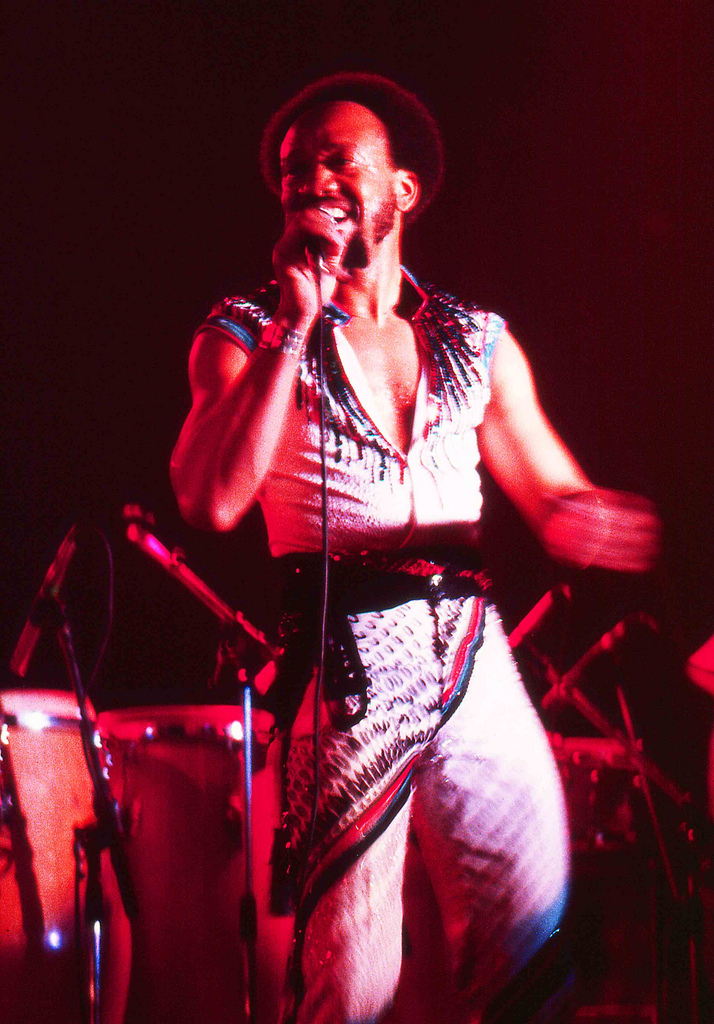
Maurice White

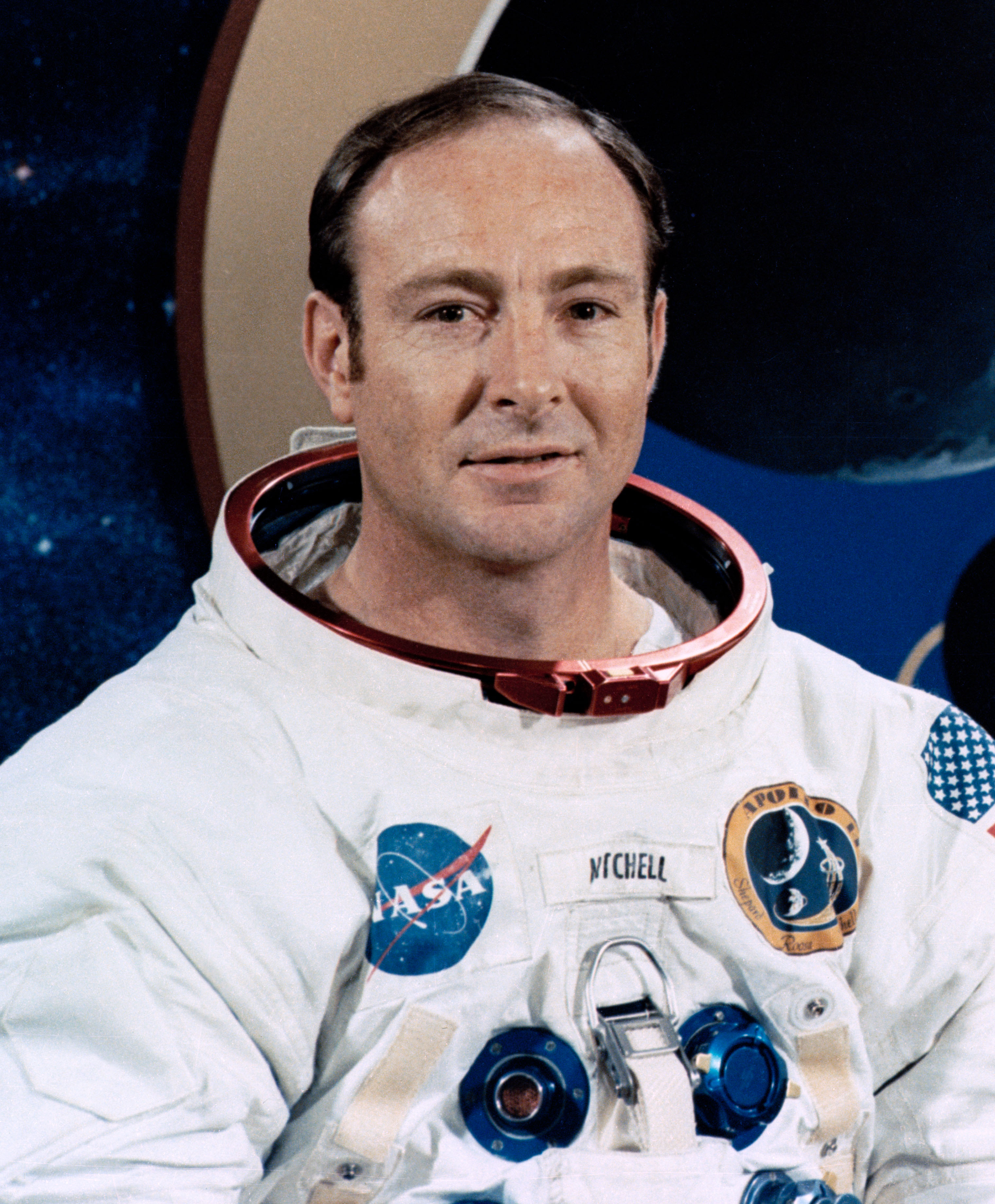
Edgar Mitchell

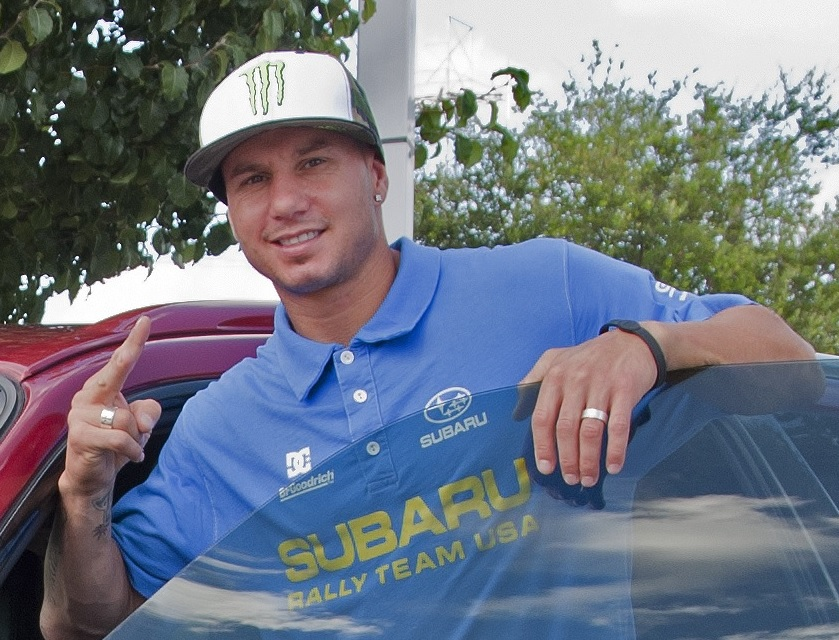
Dave Mirra

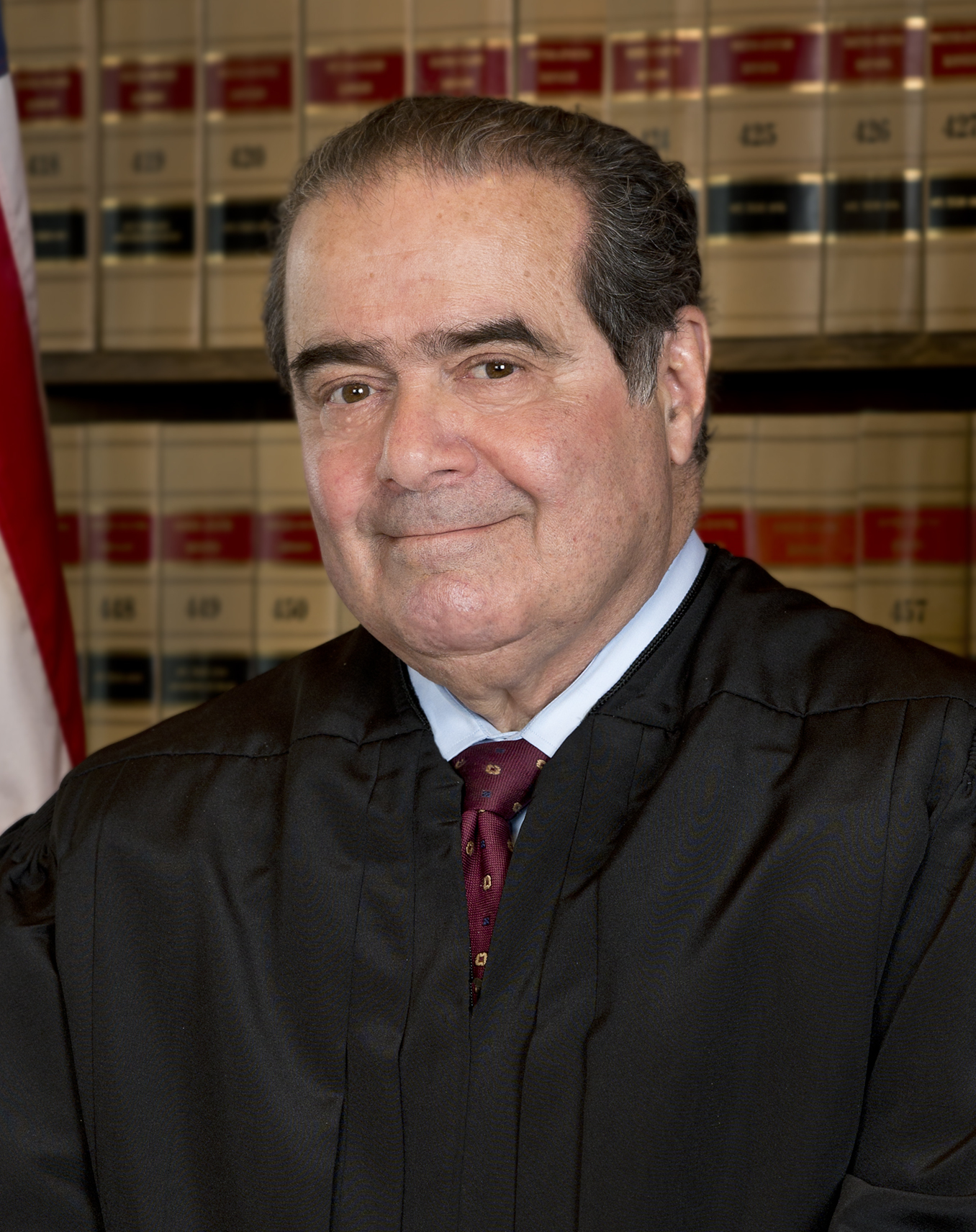
Antonin Scalia

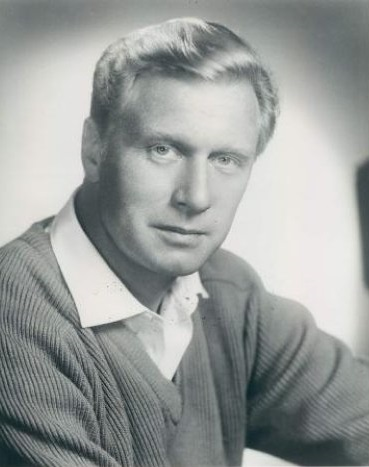
George Gaynes

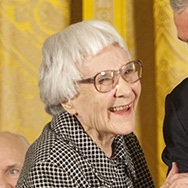
Harper Lee

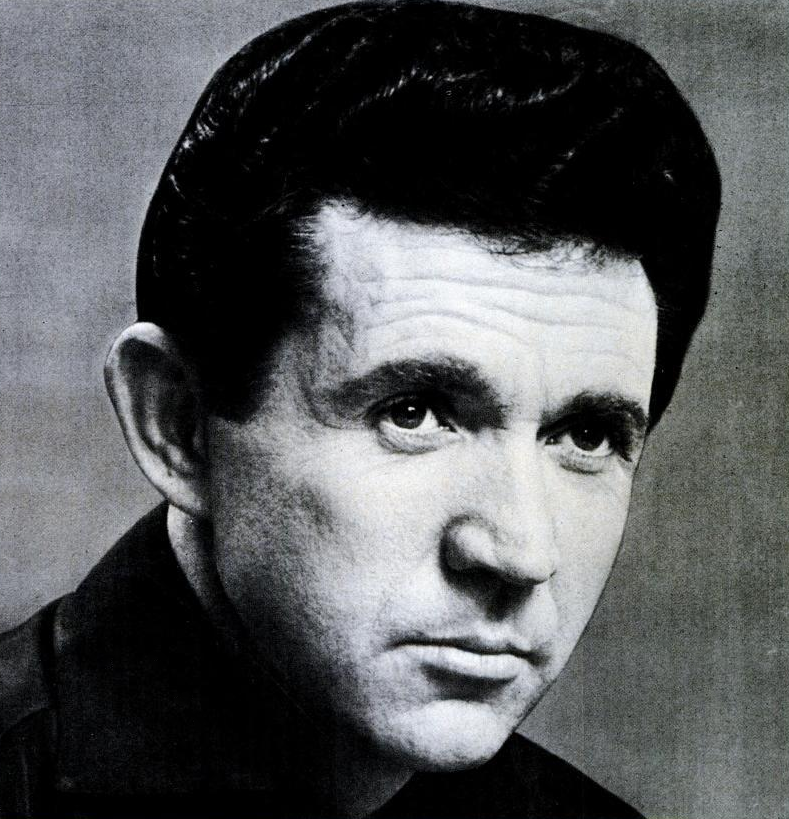
Sonny James

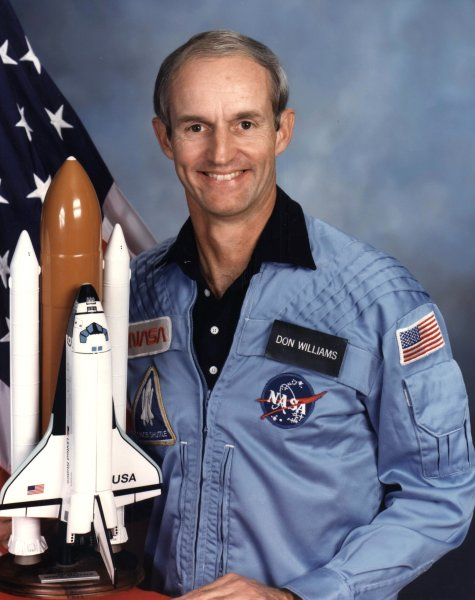
Donald E. Williams

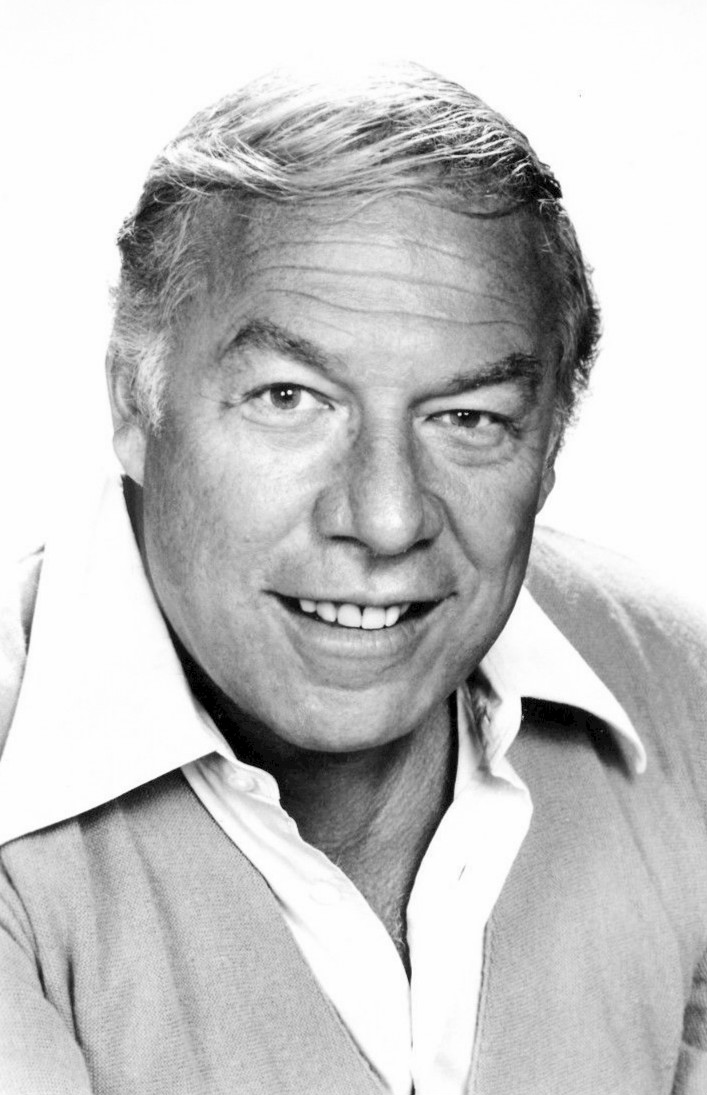
George Kennedy

- February 1
  - Jon Bunch, singer-songwriter (born 1970)
  - Thomas Tigue, politician (born 1945)
- February 2
  - Robert Beiner, television sports director (b. 1950)
  - Abram Cohen, Olympic fencer (b. 1924)
  - Bob Elliott, comedian and actor (born 1923)
  - Jim Goode, restaurateur (b. 1944)
  - Halling, racehorse (b. 1991)
  - Mike Oehler, author (b. 1937)
- February 3
  - Joe Alaskey, voice actor (born 1952)
  - John P. Riley Jr., ice hockey player (born 1920)
- February 4
  - Marlow Cook, politician; U.S. Senator (1968–1974) (born 1926)
  - Jimmie Haskell, composer and arranger (born 1936)
  - Dave Mirra, BMX rider (born 1974)
  - Edgar Mitchell, astronaut (born 1930)
  - Axl Rotten, professional wrestler (born 1971)
  - Edgar Whitcomb, 43rd Governor of Indiana (born 1917)
  - Maurice White, singer-songwriter (born 1941)
- February 5
  - Bill Birchfield, politician and lawyer (born 1935)
  - Miriam Goldman Cedarbaum, jurist (born 1929)
  - Ray Colcord, film and television composer (born 1949)
- February 6
  - Dan Gerson, screenwriter (born 1966)
  - Dan Hicks, singer-songwriter (born 1941)
- February 7
  - Andrew Glaze, poet, playwright and novelist (born 1920)
  - Redding Pitt, attorney and politician (b. 1944)
  - Thomas Rea, dermatologist and leprosy researcher (b. 1929)
- February 8
  - Charles C. Campbell, general (born 1948)
  - Johnny Duncan, actor (born 1923)
- February 9
  - Edwin McDonough, actor (b. 1943)
  - Donald E. Thorin, cinematographer (b. 1934)
- February 10
  - Andrew L. Lewis Jr., 7th United States Secretary of Transportation (born 1931)
  - Lennie Pond, race car driver (born 1940)
  - Christopher Rush, illustrator (born 1965)
  - Richard Unis, judge (born 1928)
- February 11
  - Philip A. Kuhn, British-born historian (born 1933)
  - Kevin Randleman, mixed martial artist (born 1971)
  - John Keith Wells, U.S. Marine platoon commander (born 1922)
- February 12
  - Eddie Barry, ice hockey player (born 1919)
  - Robert Frederick Froehlke, 10th United States Secretary of the Army (born 1922)
- February 13
  - Nathan Barksdale, drug dealer, dramatized in The Wire (born 1961)
  - Johnny Lattner, football player (born 1932)
  - Antonin Scalia, jurist; Associate Justice of the Supreme Court of the United States (born 1936)
- February 14 – Steven Stucky, classical music composer (born 1949)
- February 15
  - Edward T. Foote II, academic and educator; 4th president of the University of Miami (born 1937)
  - George Gaynes, Finnish-American actor (born 1917)
  - Vanity, Canadian singer (born 1959)
- February 16
  - Alisa Bellettini, television producer (born 1954)
  - Lex McAllister, reality show contestant (born 1984)
  - Robert Walker, sailor (born 1929)
- February 17 – Tony Phillips, baseball player (born 1959)
- February 18
  - Jim Davenport, baseball player (born 1933)
  - Rosario Ferré, First Lady of Puerto Rico (born 1938)
  - Tom Mullica, magician and impressionist (born 1948)
  - Angela Raiola, television personality (born 1960)
  - John Reinhardt, diplomat; U.S. Ambassador to Nigeria (1971–1975) (born 1920)
- February 19
  - Humbert Allen Astredo, actor (born 1929)
  - Harper Lee, writer (born 1926)
  - Charlie Tuna, radio personality (born 1944)
- February 20
  - Kevin Collins, baseball player (born 1946)
  - Dave Needle, computer engineer (born 1947)
- February 21 – Richard Horner Thompson, general (born 1926)
- February 22
  - Wesley A. Clark, general and computer engineer (born 1927)
  - Sonny James, singer-songwriter (born 1928)
  - Cara McCollum, journalist and beauty queen (born 1992)
- February 23 – Donald E. Williams, astronaut (born 1942)
- February 25
  - Tony Burton, actor and comedian (born 1937)
  - Alfred E. Mann, entrepreneur and philanthropist (born 1925)
- February 26
  - C. L. Blast, soul singer (b. 1934)
  - William Y. Cooper, artist (b. 1933)
  - Juan Conway McNabb, American-born Peruvian Roman Catholic prelate (b. 1925)
  - Robert Palladino, calligrapher and academic (b. 1932)
  - Robert Struble Jr., historian and author (b. 1943)
- February 28
  - George Kennedy, actor (born 1925)
  - Jack Lindquist, businessman; President of Disneyland (1990–1993) (born 1927)
- February 29
  - Stuart Beck, diplomat and law practitioner (born 1946)
  - Helias Doundoulakis, spy and inventor (born 1923)
  - Gil Hill, police officer and actor (born 1931)
  - Lee Reherman, actor (born 1966)

=== March ===
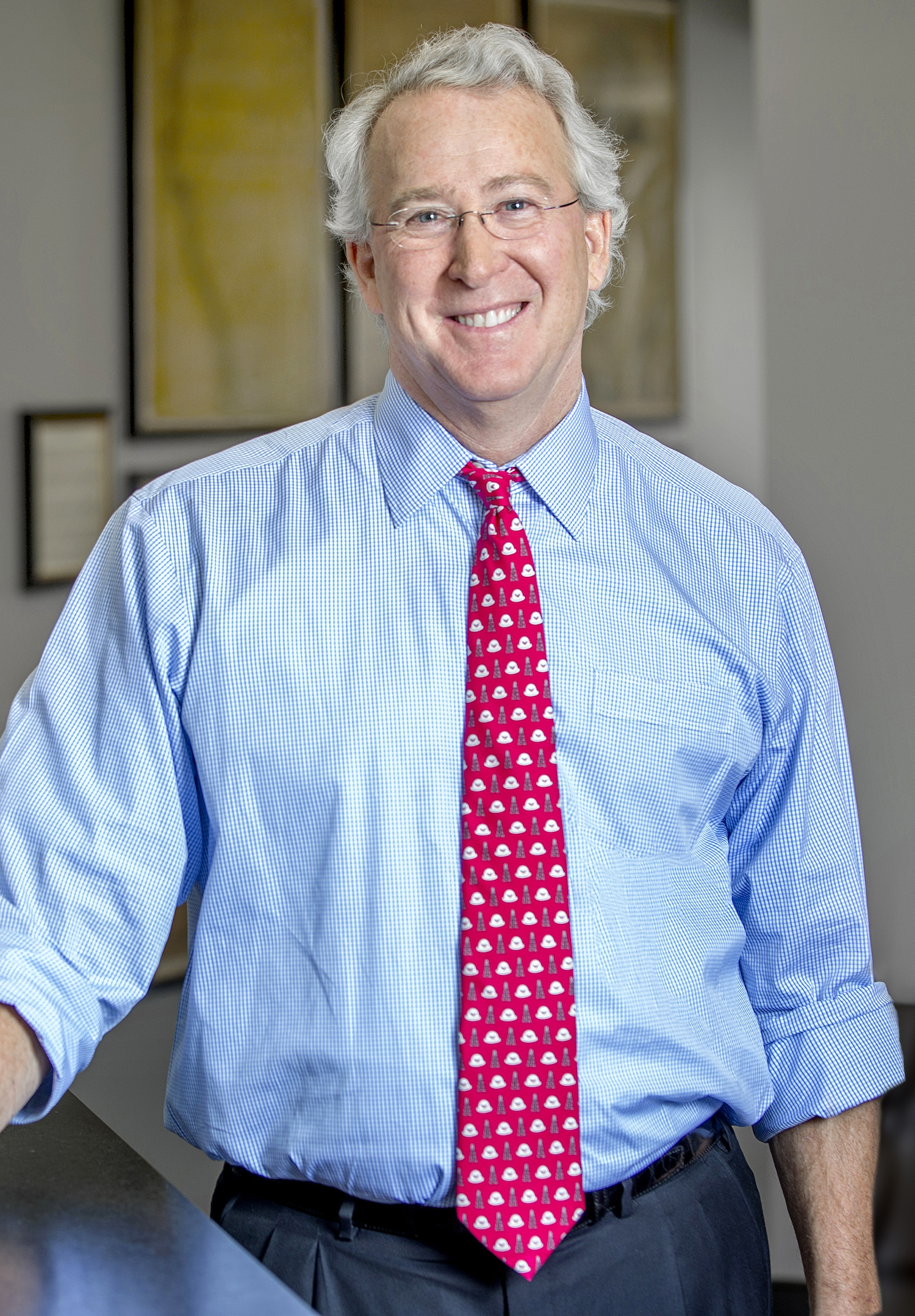
Aubrey McClendon

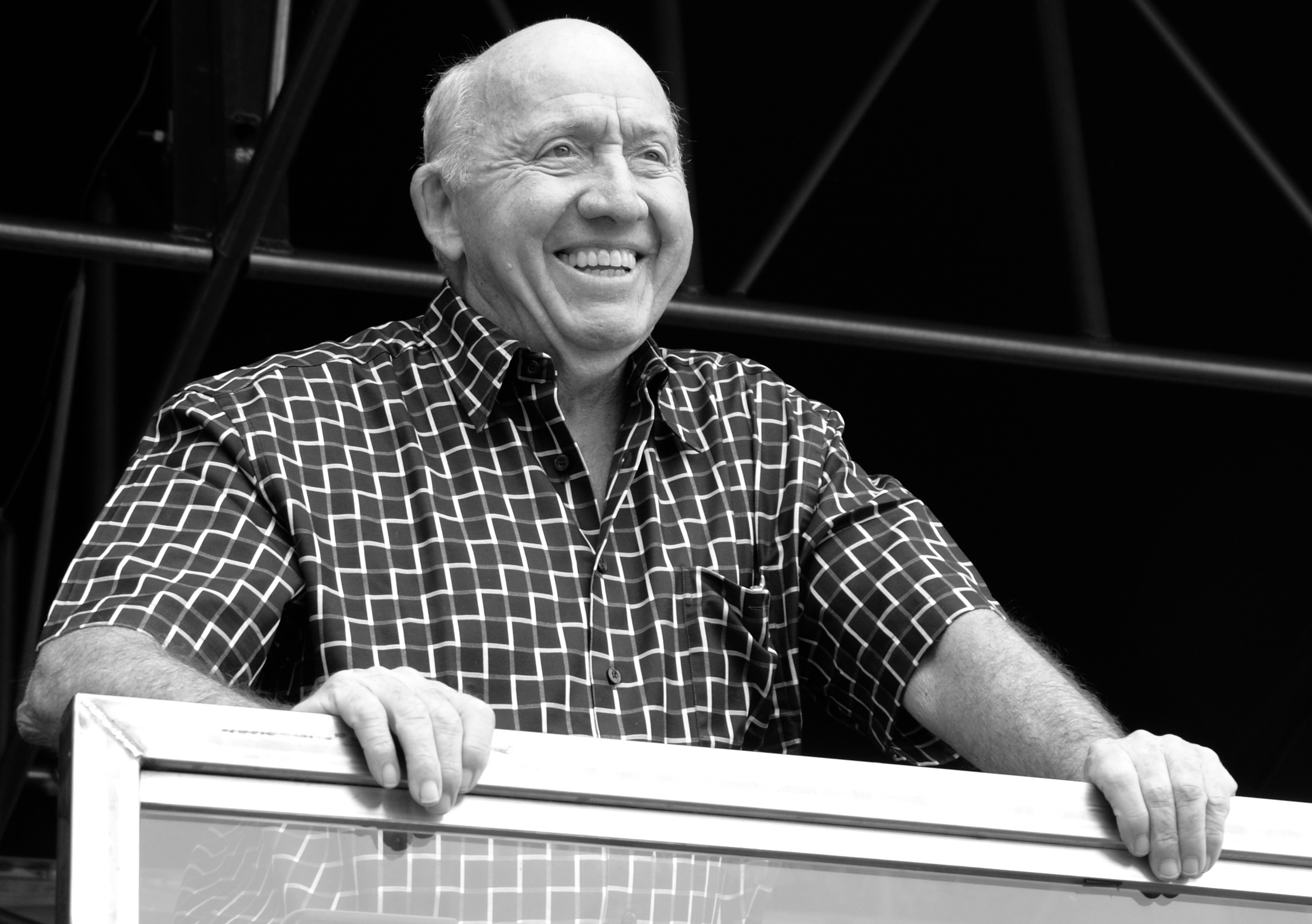
Bud Collins

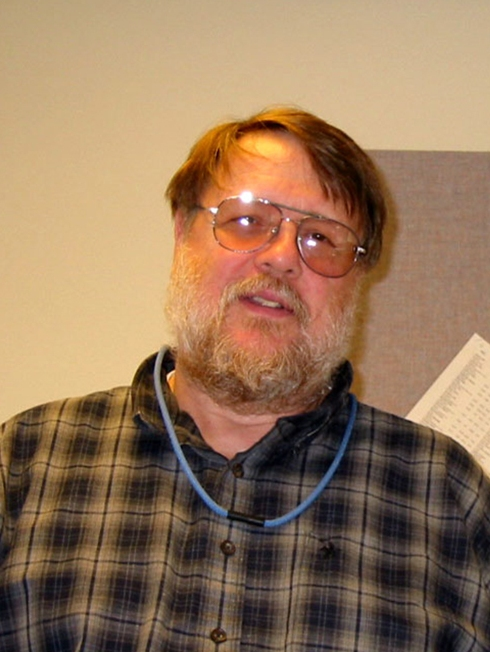
Ray Tomlinson

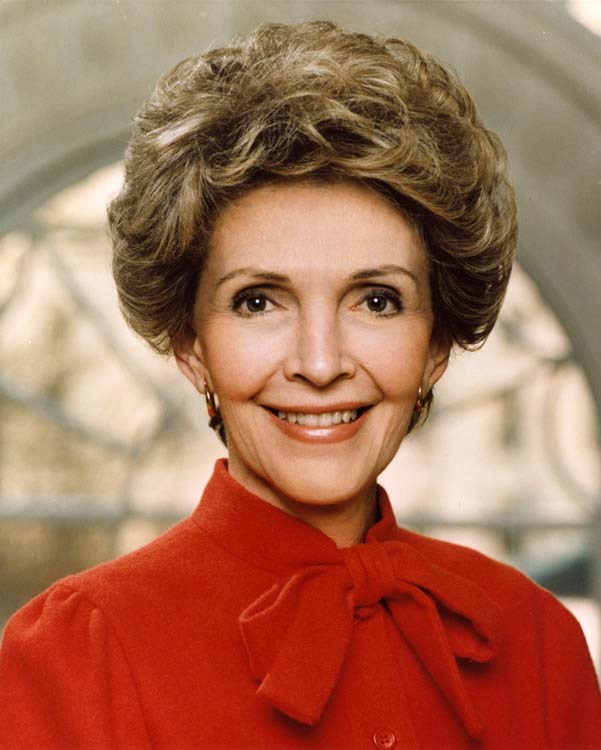
Nancy Reagan

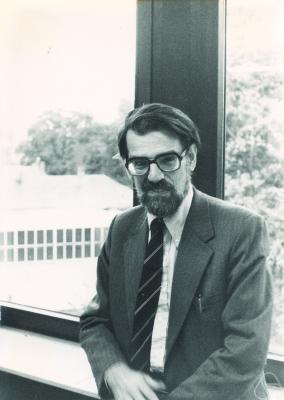
Lloyd Shapley

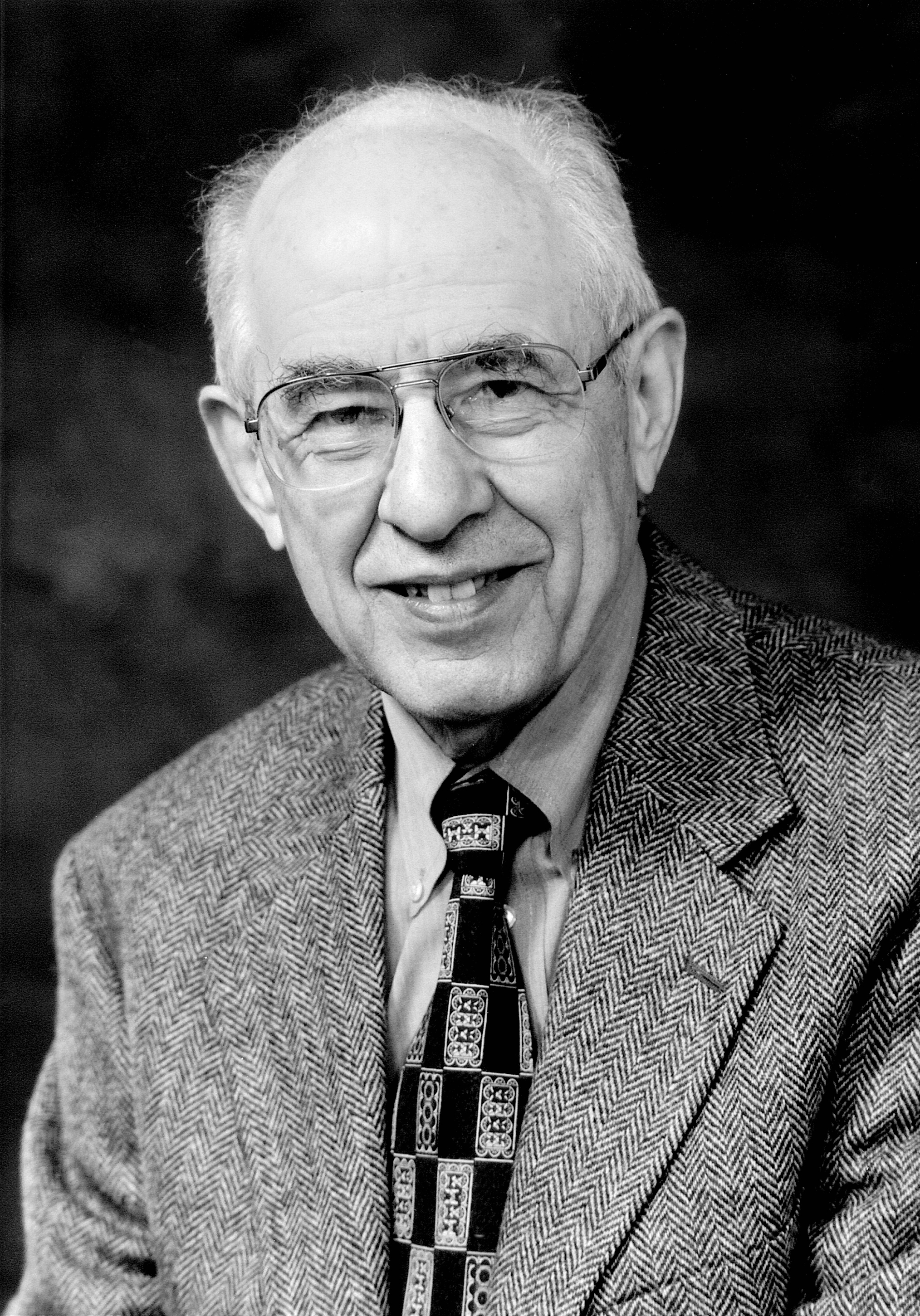
Hilary Putnam

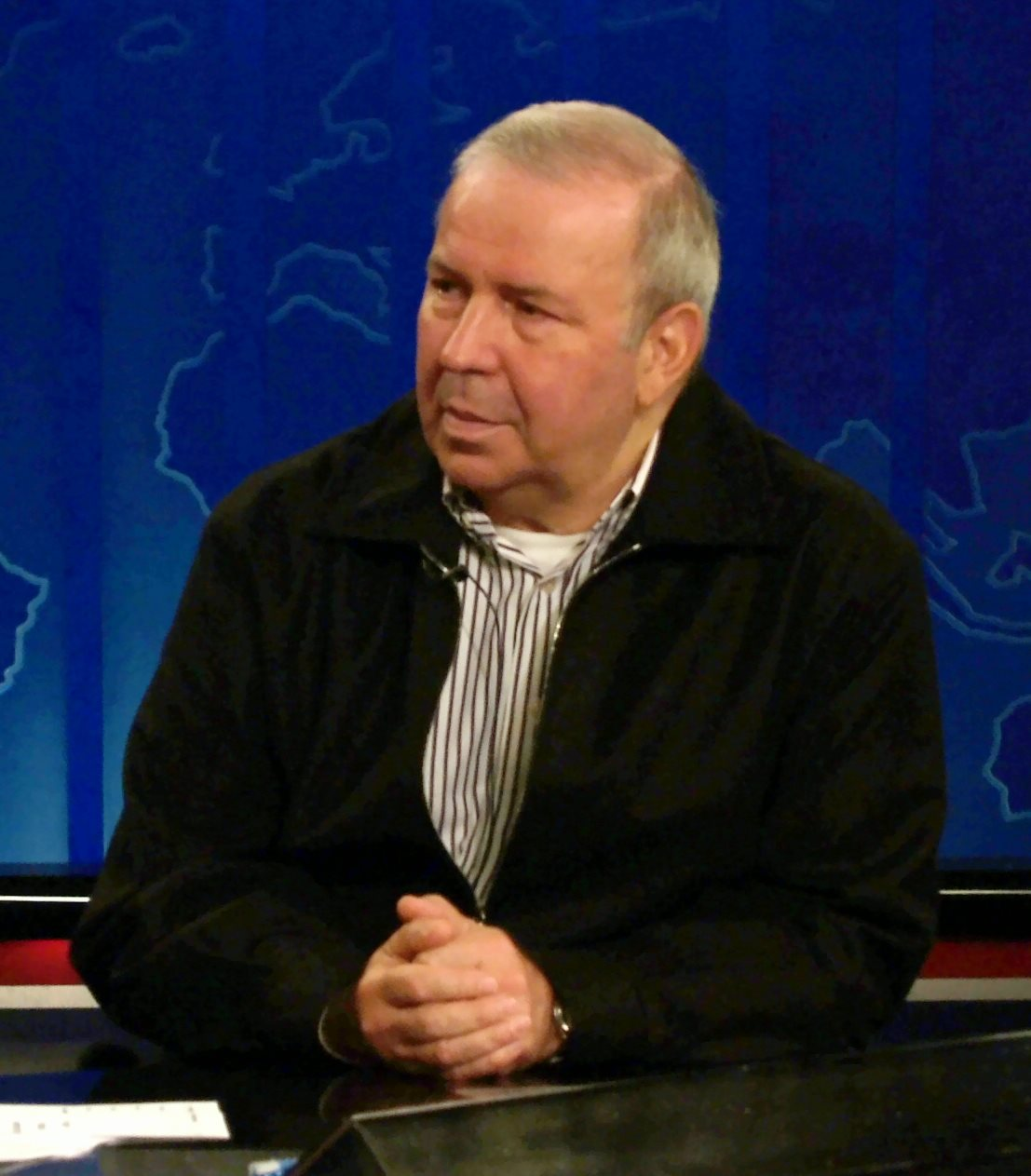
Frank Sinatra Jr.

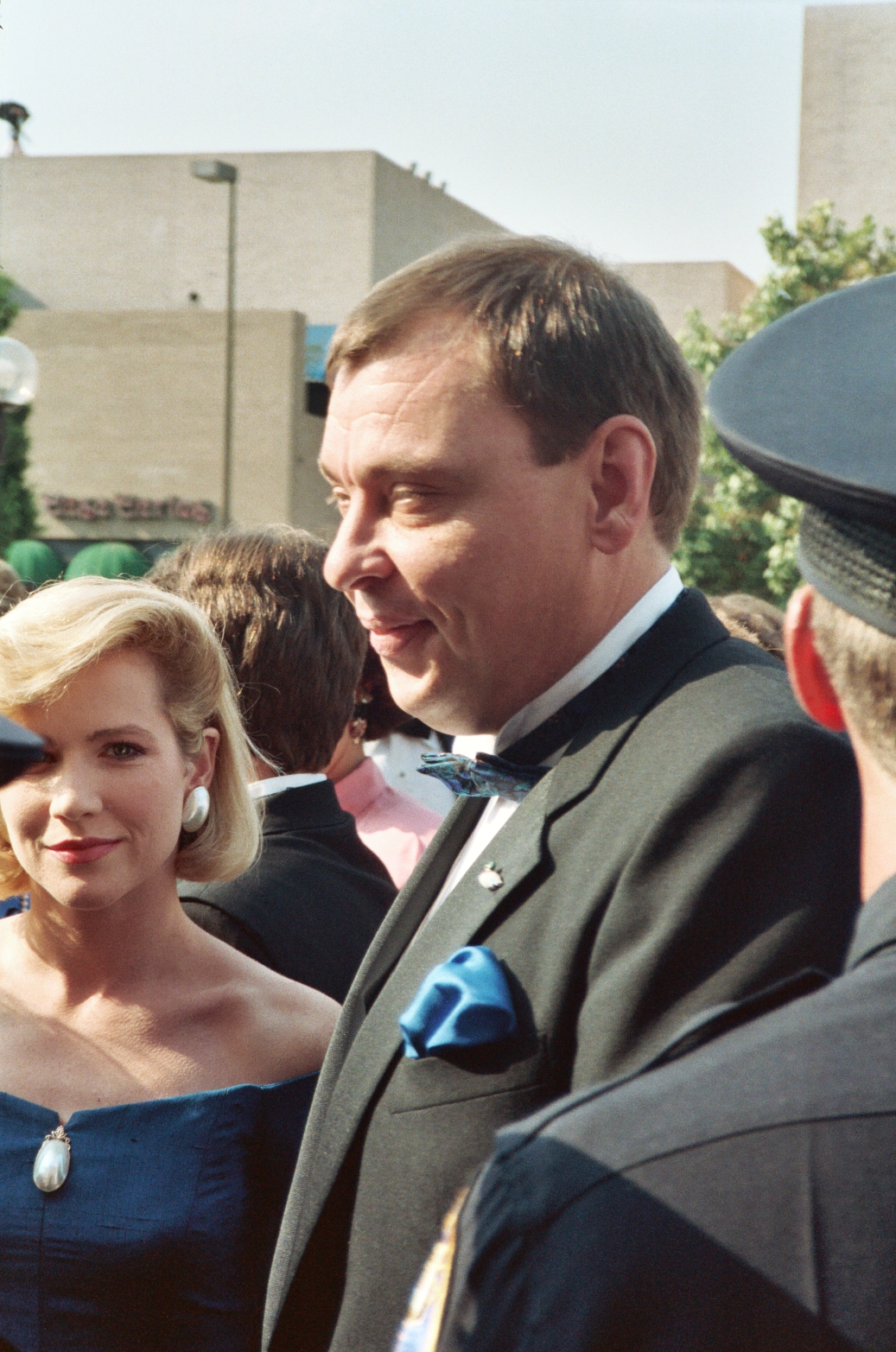
Larry Drake

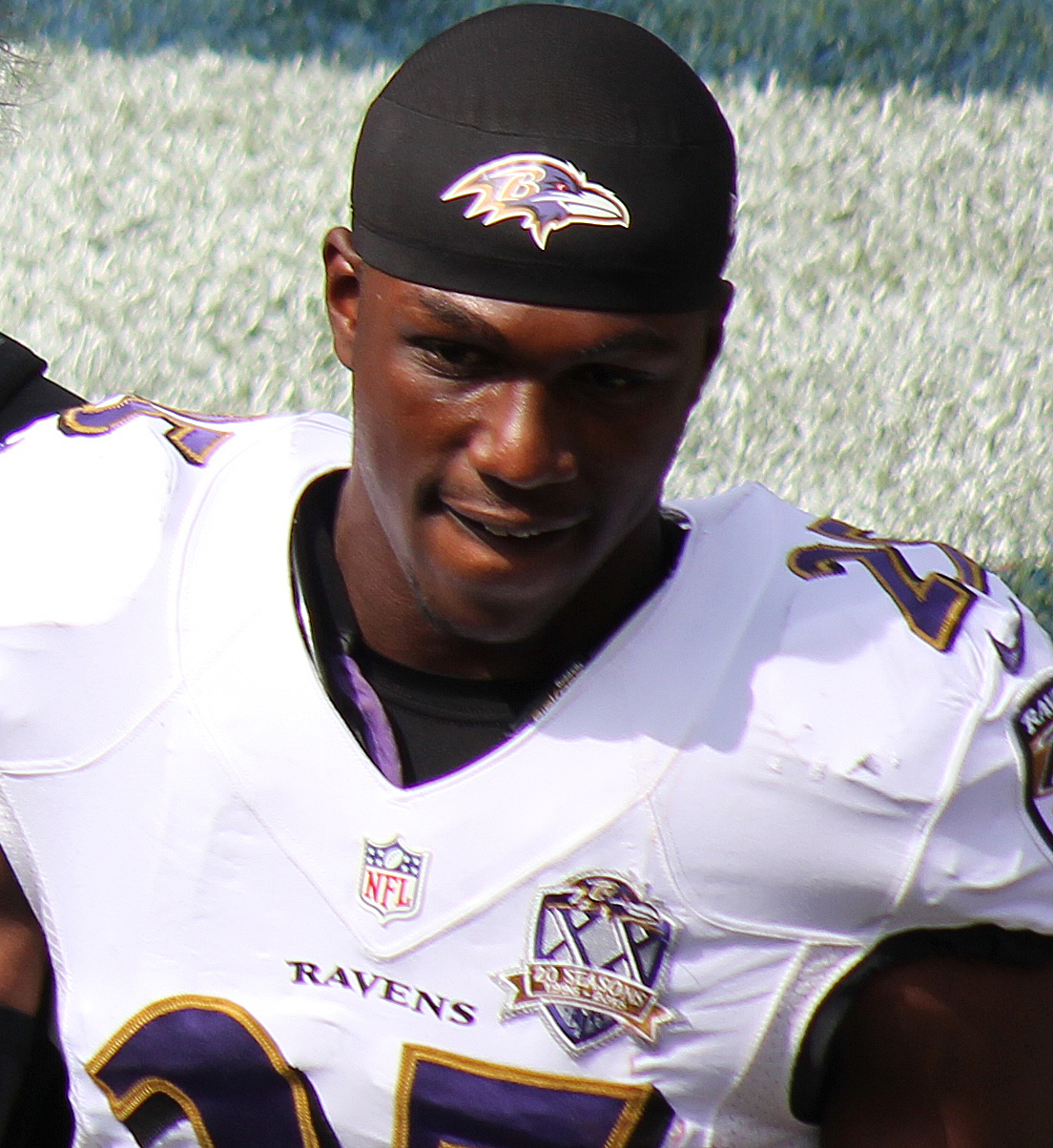
Tray Walker

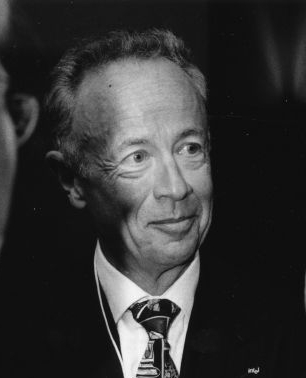
Andrew Grove

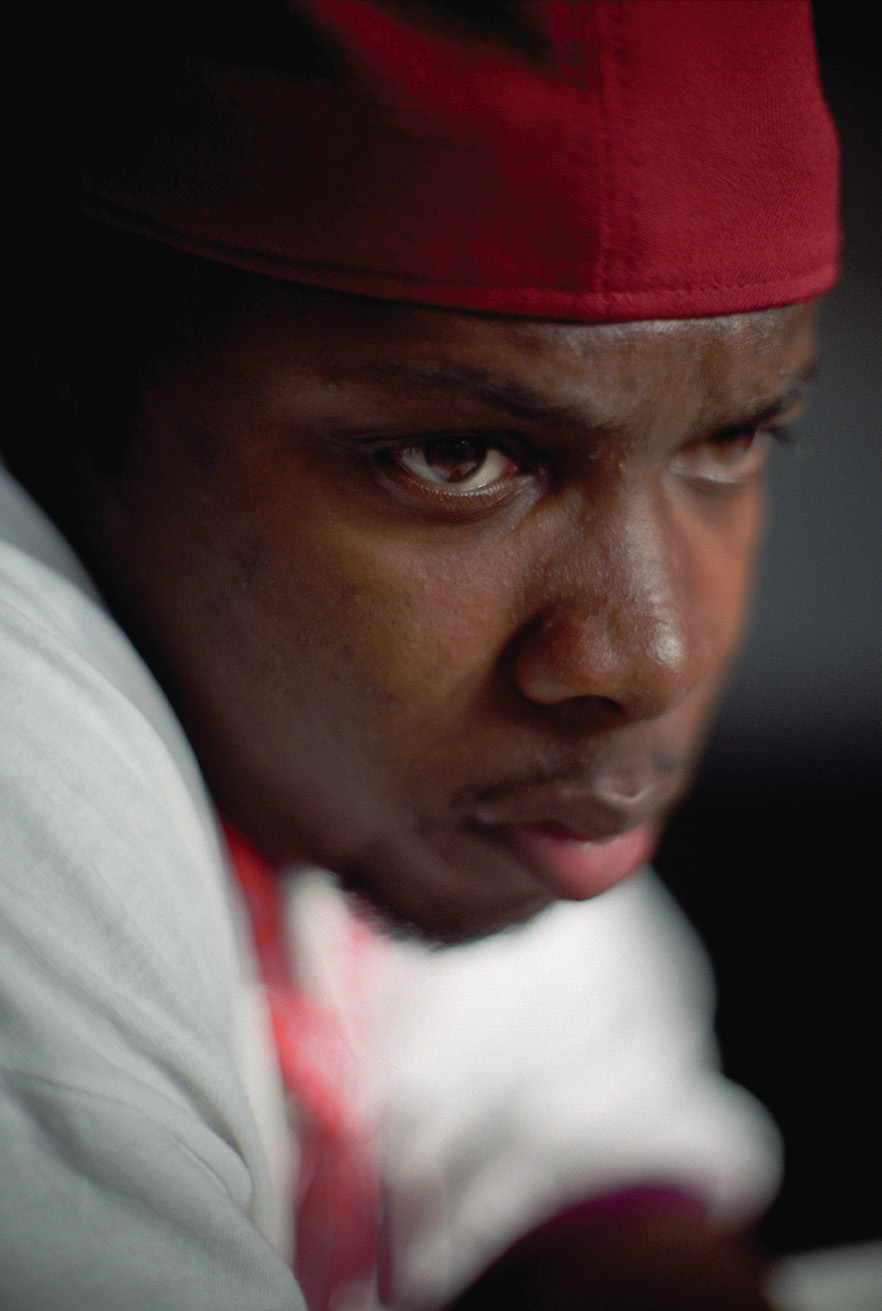
Phife Dawg

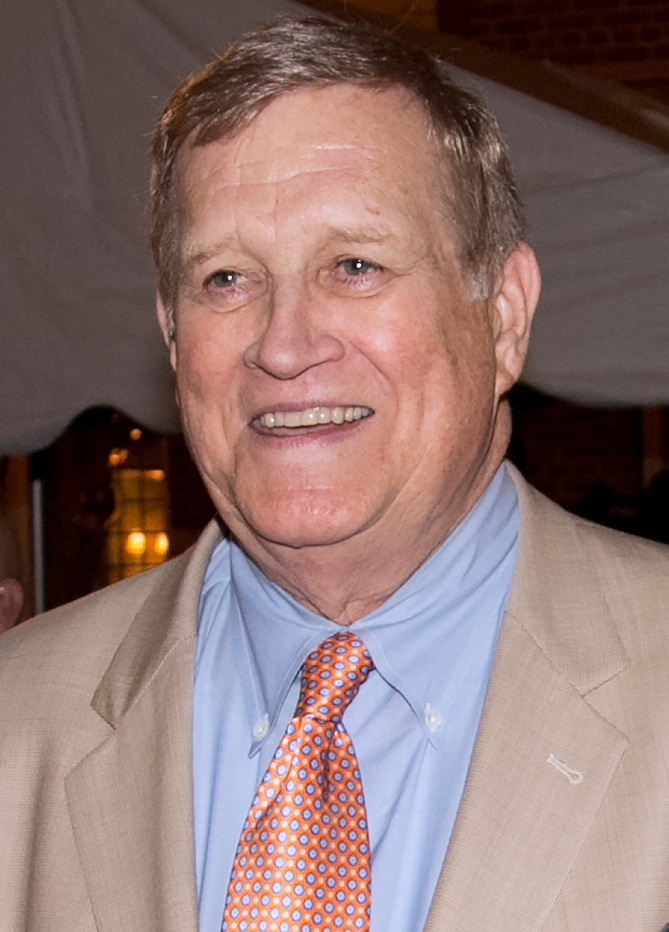
Ken Howard

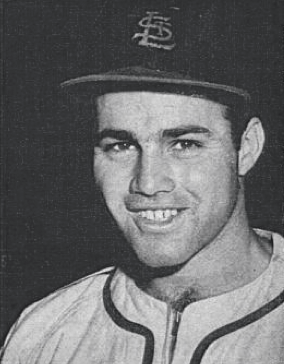
Joe Garagiola

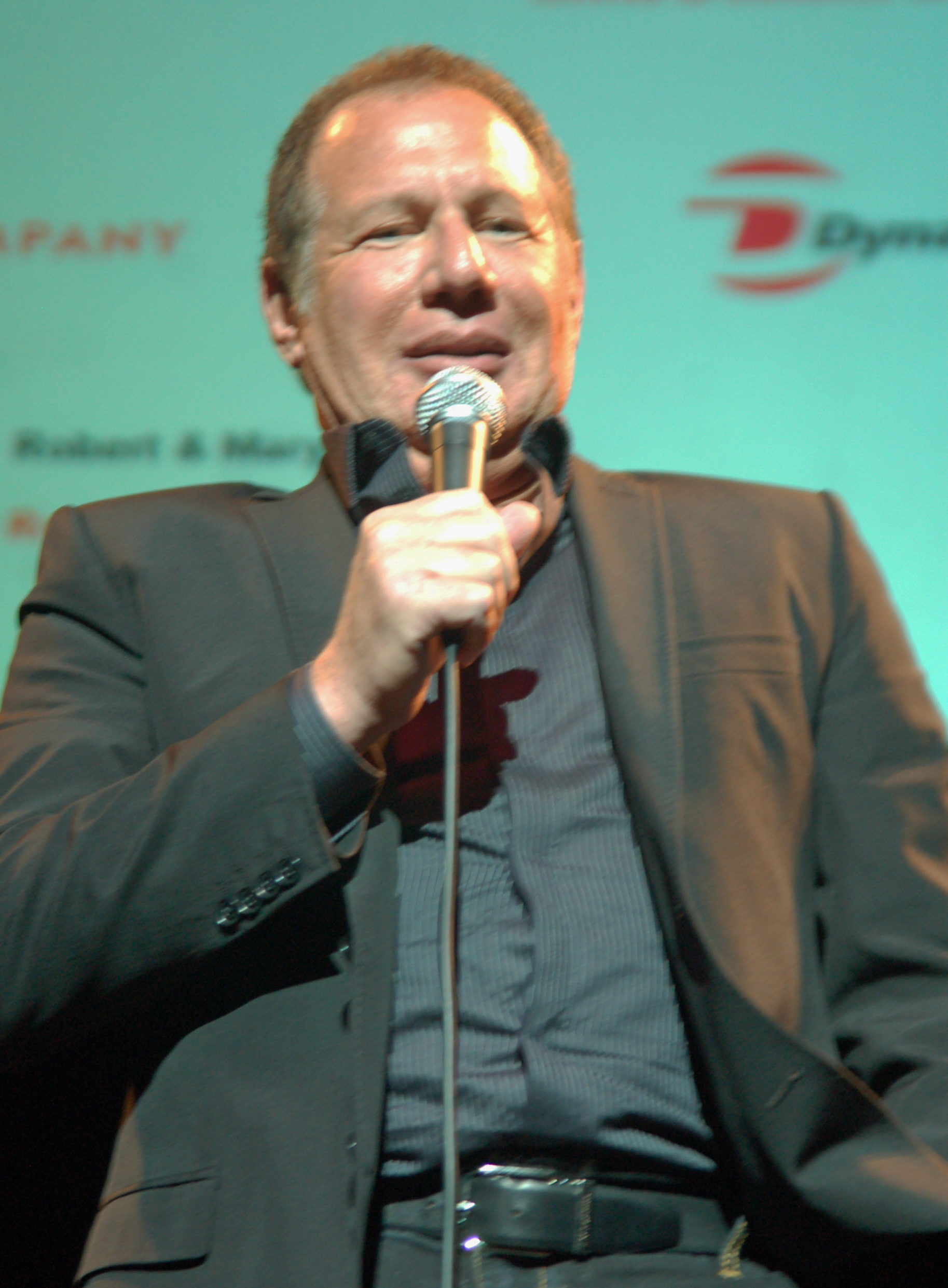
Garry Shandling

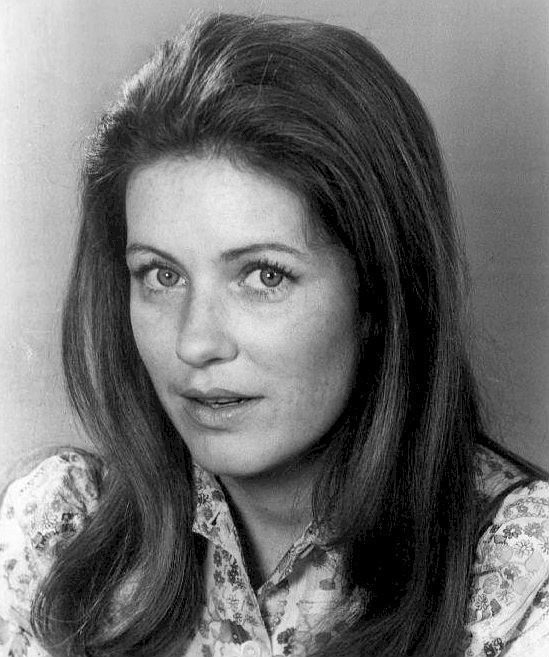
Patty Duke

- March 1
  - Martha Wright, actress and singer (born 1923)
  - Gayle McCormick, singer (born 1948)
  - Jim Kimsey, co-founder and CEO of AOL (born 1939)
  - Adam Dziewonski, Polish-born geophysicist (born 1936)
  - Coca Crystal, television personality (born 1947)
  - Stuart Beck, lawyer and diplomat (born 1946)
- March 2
  - R. Tom Zuidema, Dutch-born anthropologist (born 1927)
  - James Barrett McNulty, 26th Mayor of Scranton, Pennsylvania (born 1945)
  - Aubrey McClendon, businessman and part-owner of the Oklahoma City Thunder (born 1959)
  - Dick Hudson, football player (born 1940)
  - Rosemary Hinkfuss, politician (born 1931)
  - Robert Del Tufo, Attorney General of New Jersey (born 1933)
- March 3
  - Retta Ward, health official and educator (born 1953)
  - William O'Brien, police officer (born 1944)
  - Laura Knaperek, politician (born 1955)
  - Henry R. Horsey, judge (born 1924)
  - Gavin Christopher, singer, songwriter, musician and producer (born 1949)
  - Jack Buckalew, politician (born 1932)
  - Rooney L. Bowen, politician (born 1933)
  - Ralph Baruch, President of Viacom (born 1923)
- March 4
  - William H. Plackett, naval non-commissioned officer (born 1937)
  - Thomas G. Morris, politician (born 1919)
  - Joey Martin Feek, country singer (born 1975)
  - Pat Conroy, author (born 1945)
  - Bud Collins, journalist and sportscaster (born 1929)
- March 5
  - Al Wistert, football player (born 1920)
  - Ray Tomlinson, computer programmer (born 1941)
  - Robert Redbird, artist (born 1939)
  - Caesar Belser, football player (born 1944)
- March 6
  - Gary Smalley, family counselor and author (born 1940)
  - Harold H. Saunders, diplomat (born 1930)
  - Nancy Reagan, First Lady of the United States (born 1921)
  - Elizabeth Garrett, 13th president of Cornell University (born 1963)
  - Jerry Bridges, evangelist and author (born 1929)
  - Barbara Almond, psychiatrist (born 1938)
- March 7
  - Quentin Young, physician and activist (born 1923)
  - Paul Ryan, comic artist (born 1949)
  - Steve Kraly, baseball player (born 1929)
  - Bobby Johns, race car driver (born 1932)
  - Joe Cabot, jazz trumpeter and bandleader (born 1921)
  - Gary Braasch, photographer (born 1945)
- March 8
  - Alfred E. Senn, historian and academic (born 1932)
  - David S. Johnson, computer scientist (born 1945)
  - Ron Jacobs, broadcaster (born 1937)
  - Richard Davalos, actor (born 1930)
- March 9
  - Coy Wayne Wesbrook, convicted mass murderer (born 1958)
  - Bill Wade, football player (born 1930)
  - Clyde Lovellette, basketball player (born 1929)
  - Ralph S. Larsen, CEO of Johnson & Johnson (born 1938)
  - John Gutfreund, investor and CEO of Salomon Brothers (born 1929)
  - Robert Horton, actor (born 1924)
- March 10
  - Gogi Grant, pop singer (born 1924)
  - William Dyke, Mayor of Madison, Wisconsin (born 1930)
  - Ernestine Anderson, jazz singer (born 1928)
- March 11
  - Ruth Terry, singer and actress (born 1920)
  - Gerard Reedy, 30th president of the College of the Holy Cross (born 1939)
  - Louis Meyers, festival organizer, co-founder of SXSW (born 1955)
  - Shawn Elliott, actor and singer (born 1937)
  - Ben Bagdikian, educator and journalist (born 1920)
  - Joe Ascione, jazz drummer (born 1961)
  - Keith Emerson, English keyboardist, songwriter, composer, and record producer (born 1944)
- March 12
  - Bill Whitby, baseball player (born 1943)
  - Lloyd Shapley, mathematician and economist, Nobel Prize laureate (born 1923)
  - Morton Hunt, psychologist and science writer (born 1920)
  - Verena Huber-Dyson, mathematician (born 1923)
  - Donnie Duncan, football coach (born 1940)
  - Tommy Brown, singer (born 1931)
- March 13
  - Martin Olav Sabo, politician (born 1938)
  - Hilary Putnam, philosopher, mathematician and computer scientist (born 1926)
  - Sidney Mear, trumpeter (born 1918)
  - Darryl Hunt, justice reform activist (born 1965)
- March 14
  - Vic Schwenk, football player, coach and executive (born 1924)
  - June Peppas, baseball player (born 1929)
  - Lloyd R. Leavitt Jr., lieutenant general (born 1928)
  - Geoffrey Hartman, German-born literary theorist (born 1929)
  - Tamara Grigsby, politician and social worker (born 1974)
  - Virgilio Elizondo, Roman Catholic priest, theologian and civil rights activist (born 1935)
  - Patrick Cain, football player (born 1962)
  - John W. Cahn, German-born metallurgist (born 1928)
- March 15
  - Alice Pollitt, baseball player (born 1929)
  - Earline W. Parmon, politician (born 1943)
  - Ralph C. Johnson, politician and businessman (born 1953)
  - Daryl Coley, gospel singer (born 1955)
- March 16
  - Alexander Esenin-Volpin, Russian-born poet and mathematician (born 1924)
  - Frank Sinatra Jr., singer and actor (born 1944)
  - Gene Short, basketball player (born 1953)
  - William B. Bader, civil servant (born 1931)
- March 17
  - Steve Young, singer-songwriter (born 1942)
  - Charles Kaufman, music educator (born 1928)
  - Larry Drake, actor (born 1950)
  - Claudine K. Brown, museum director (born 1949)
  - E.L. Boteler, farmer and politician (born 1920)
  - Ralph David Abernathy III, politician and businessman (born 1959)
- March 18
  - Harold Zisla, painter (born 1925)
  - Tray Walker, football player (born 1992)
  - Joe Santos, actor (born 1931)
  - Fred Richards, baseball player (born 1927)
  - Cherylene Lee, actress and playwright (born 1956)
  - David Egan, singer-songwriter and pianist (born 1954)
- March 19
  - Jerry Taylor, politician and businessman (born 1937)
  - Bob Adelman, photographer (born 1930)
- March 20
  - Gayle Hopkins, long jumper (born 1941)
  - Robert J. Healey, political activist and attorney (born 1957)
- March 21
  - Carolyn Squires, nurse and politician (born 1940)
  - Andrew Grove, Hungarian-born electronic executive (born 1936)
  - Leon Charney, real estate investor, author, media personality and philanthropist (born 1938)
  - Peter Brown, actor (born 1935)
  - Leroy Blunt, politician (born 1921)
- March 22
  - Adam Kelly Ward, convicted murderer (born 1982)
  - Harold J. Morowitz, biophysicist (born 1927)
  - Rita Gam, actress (born 1927)
  - Santiago J. Erevia, soldier, Medal of Honor recipient (born 1946)
  - Glen Dawson, rock climber and mountaineer (born 1912)
  - Phife Dawg, rapper (born 1970)
  - Richard Bradford, actor (born 1934)
- March 23
  - John McKibbin, politician and businessman (born 1947)
  - Ken Howard, actor and president of SAG/SAG-AFTRA (2009–2016) (born 1944)
  - Ruth Inge Hardison, sculptor, artist and photographer (born 1914)
  - Joe Garagiola, baseball player and broadcaster (born 1926)
- March 24
  - Kevin Turner, football player (born 1969)
  - Garry Shandling, actor, comedian and writer (born 1949)
  - Nicholas Scoppetta, 31st Commissioner of the New York City Fire Department (born 1932)
  - Leonard L. Northrup Jr., engineer (born 1918)
  - Edgar G. "Sonny" Mouton Jr., politician (born 1929)
  - Tibor R. Machan, Hungarian-born philosopher (born 1939)
  - Earl Hamner Jr., television writer and producer (born 1923)
  - Maggie Blye, actress (born 1939)
- March 25
  - Shannon Bolin, actress and singer (born 1917)
  - David H. Porter, 5th president of Skidmore College (born 1935)
  - Lester Thurow, political economist (born 1938)
- March 26
  - Donald Stoltenberg, painter and author (born 1927)
  - Jim Harrison, author (born 1937)
  - David Baker, jazz composer (born 1931)
- March 27
  - Gilbert Horn Sr., soldier, politician and judge (born 1923)
  - Curtis Hertel, 64th Speaker of the Michigan House of Representatives (born 1953)
  - Toni Grant, psychologist and radio personality (born 1942)
  - Eric Engberg, news correspondent (born 1941)
  - Vince Boryla, basketball player, coach and executive (born 1927)
  - Mother Angelica, Franciscan nun and founder of EWTN (born 1923)
- March 28
  - W. Ward Reynoldson, lawyer and judge (born 1920)
  - James Noble, actor (born 1922)
  - Igor Khait, animator (born 1963)
  - Bogdan Denitch, Bulgarian-born sociologist (born 1929)
- March 29
  - John Wittenborn, football player (born 1936)
  - Steven Sample, 10th president of the University of Southern California (born 1940)
  - Patty Duke, actress and president of SAG (1985–1988) (born 1946)
  - Frank De Felitta, author, producer and director (born 1921)
- March 30
  - Bill Rosendahl, politician (born 1945)
  - J. Thomas Rosch, lawyer (born 1939)
  - Frankie Michaels, singer and actor (born 1955)
  - Shirley Hufstedler, 1st United States Secretary of Education (born 1925)
- March 31
  - Ward Wettlaufer, golfer (born 1935)
  - Terry Plumeri, musician, conductor and composer (born 1944)
  - Eugene E. Parker, sports agent (born 1956)
  - Werner Baer, economist (born 1931)

=== April ===
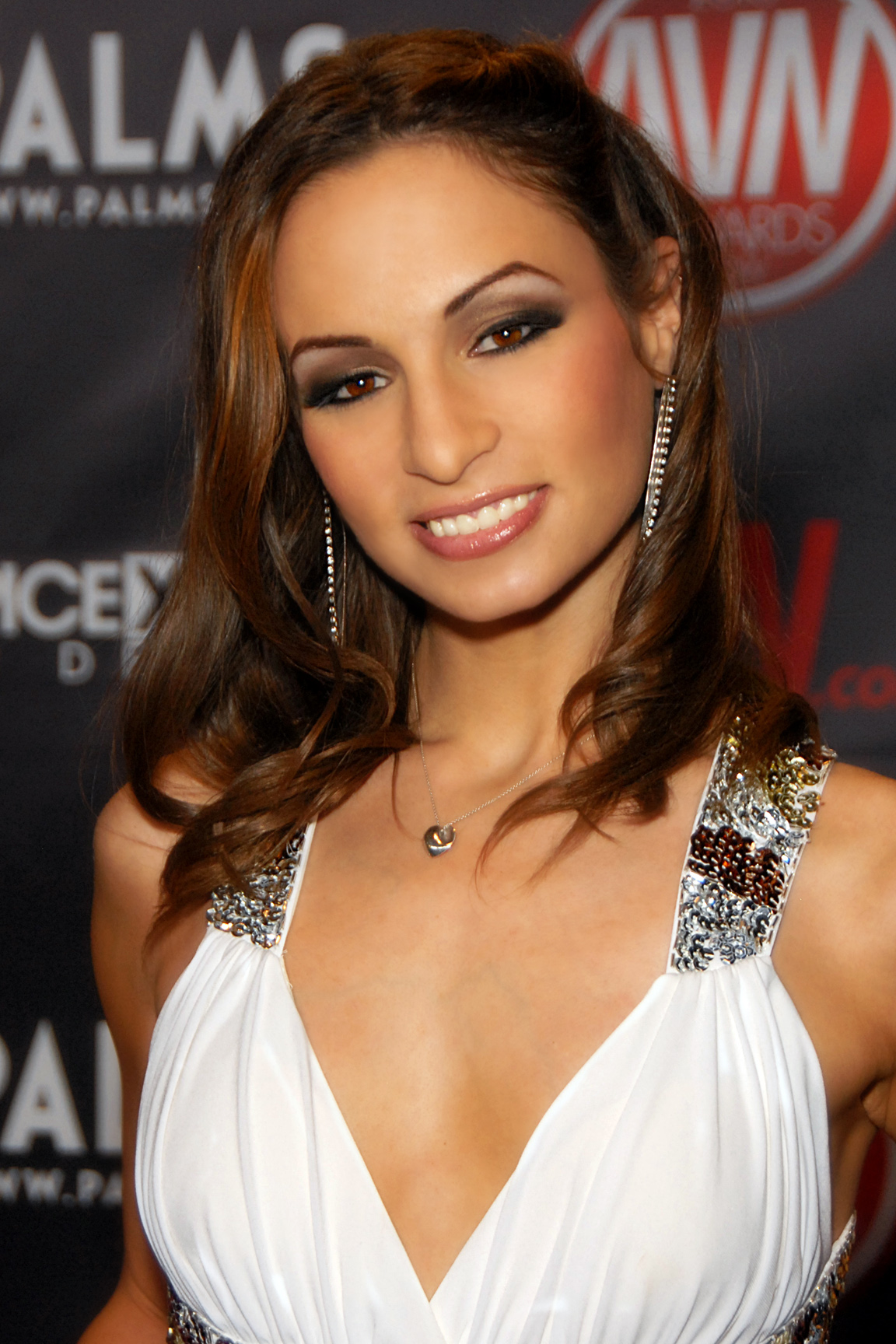
Amber Rayne

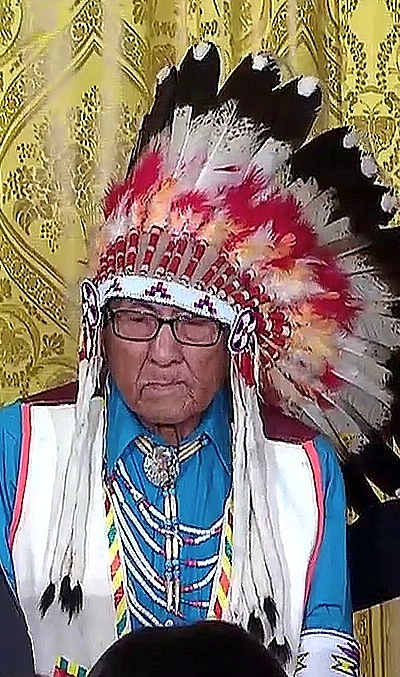
Joe Medicine Crow

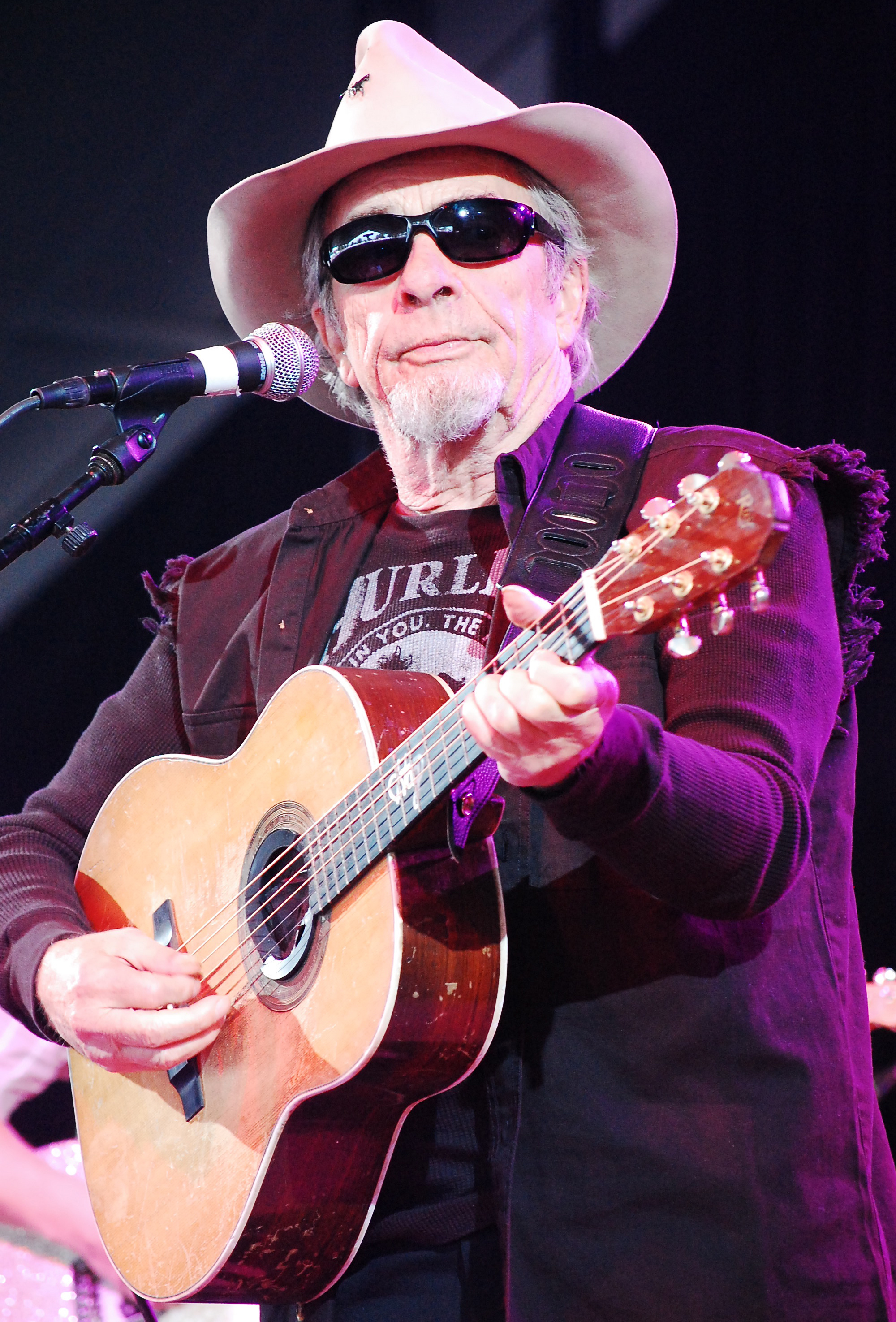
Merle Haggard

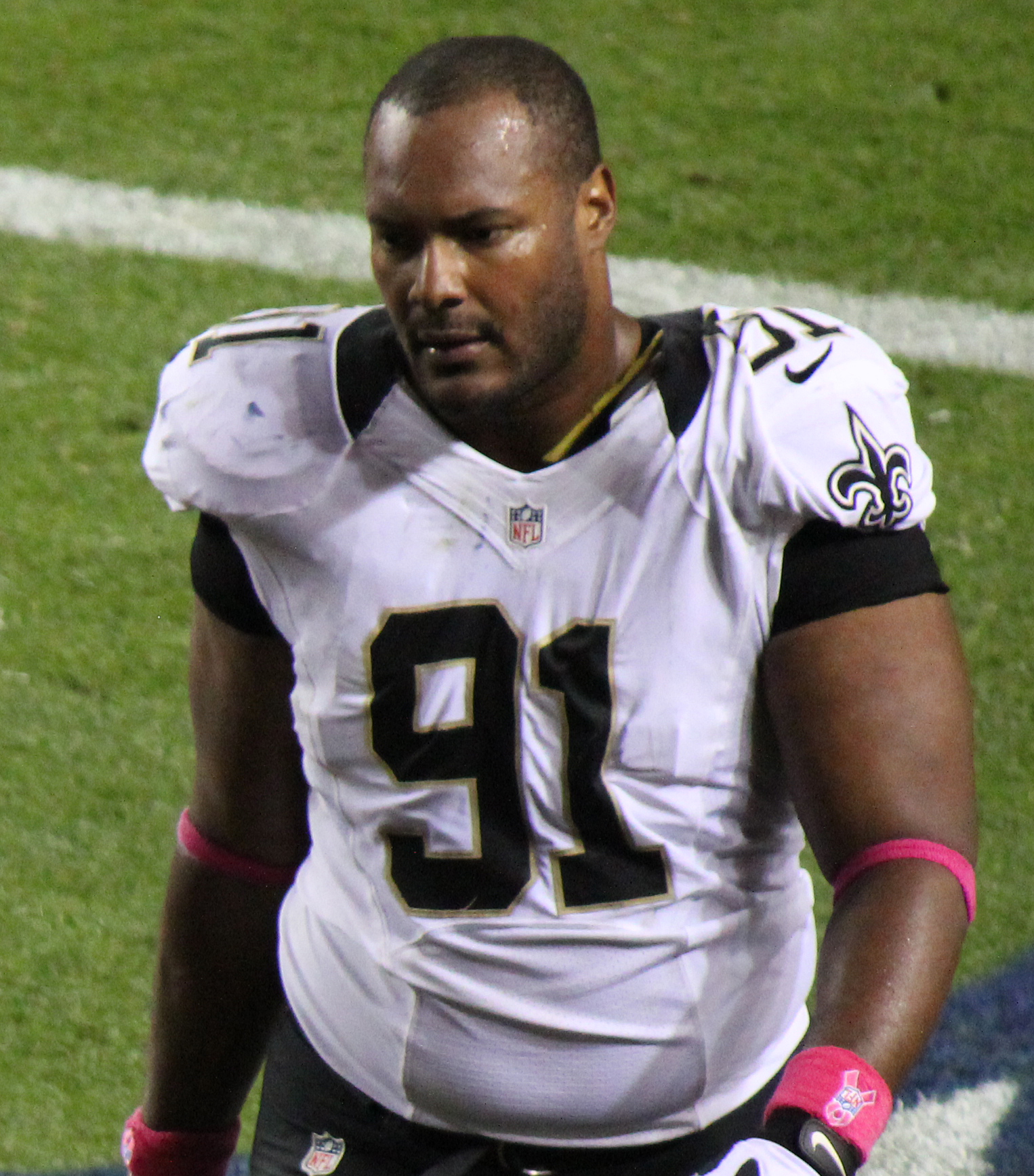
Will Smith

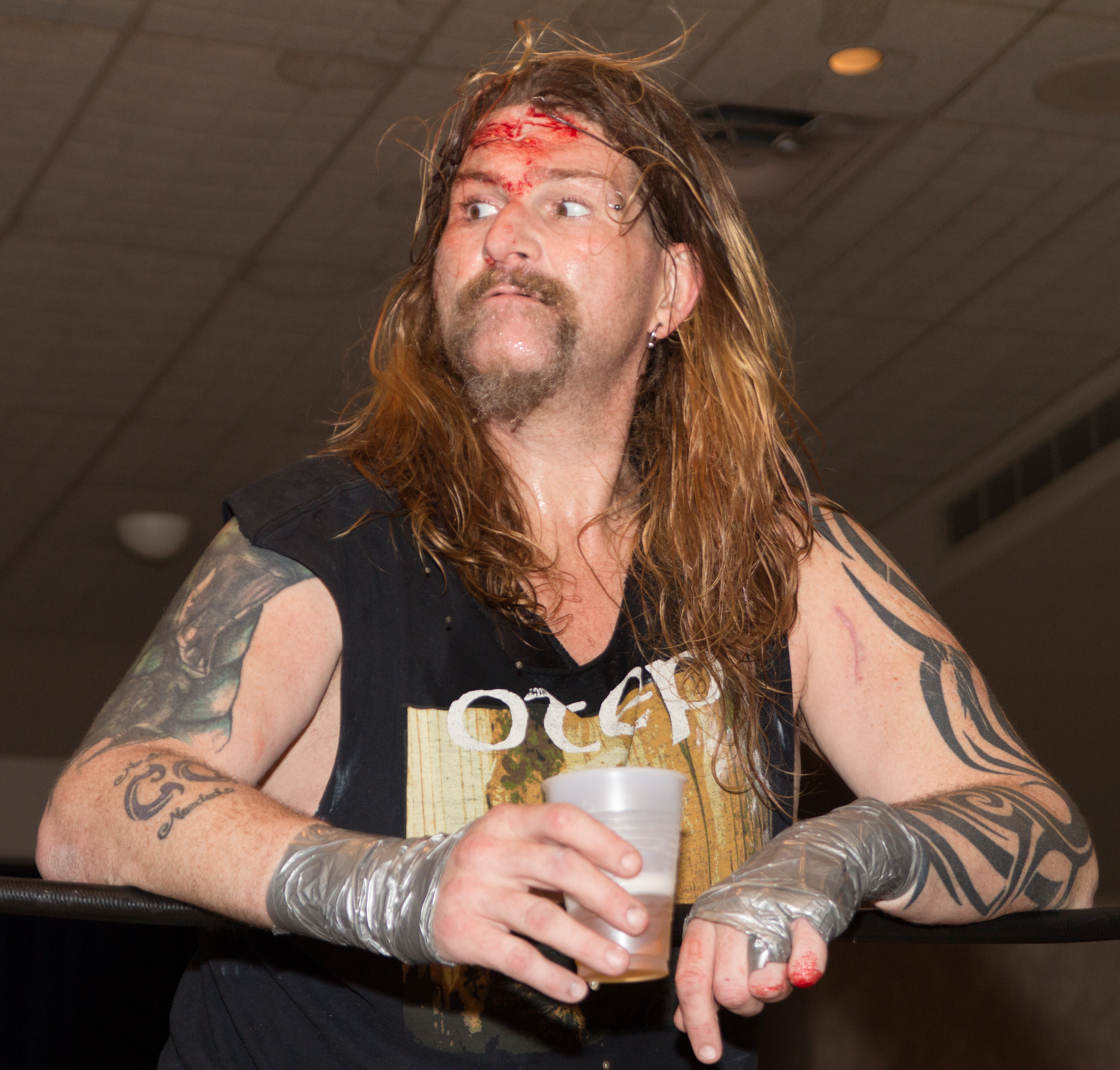
Balls Mahoney

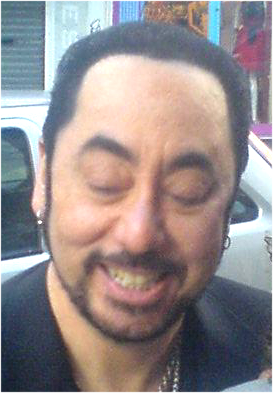
David Gest

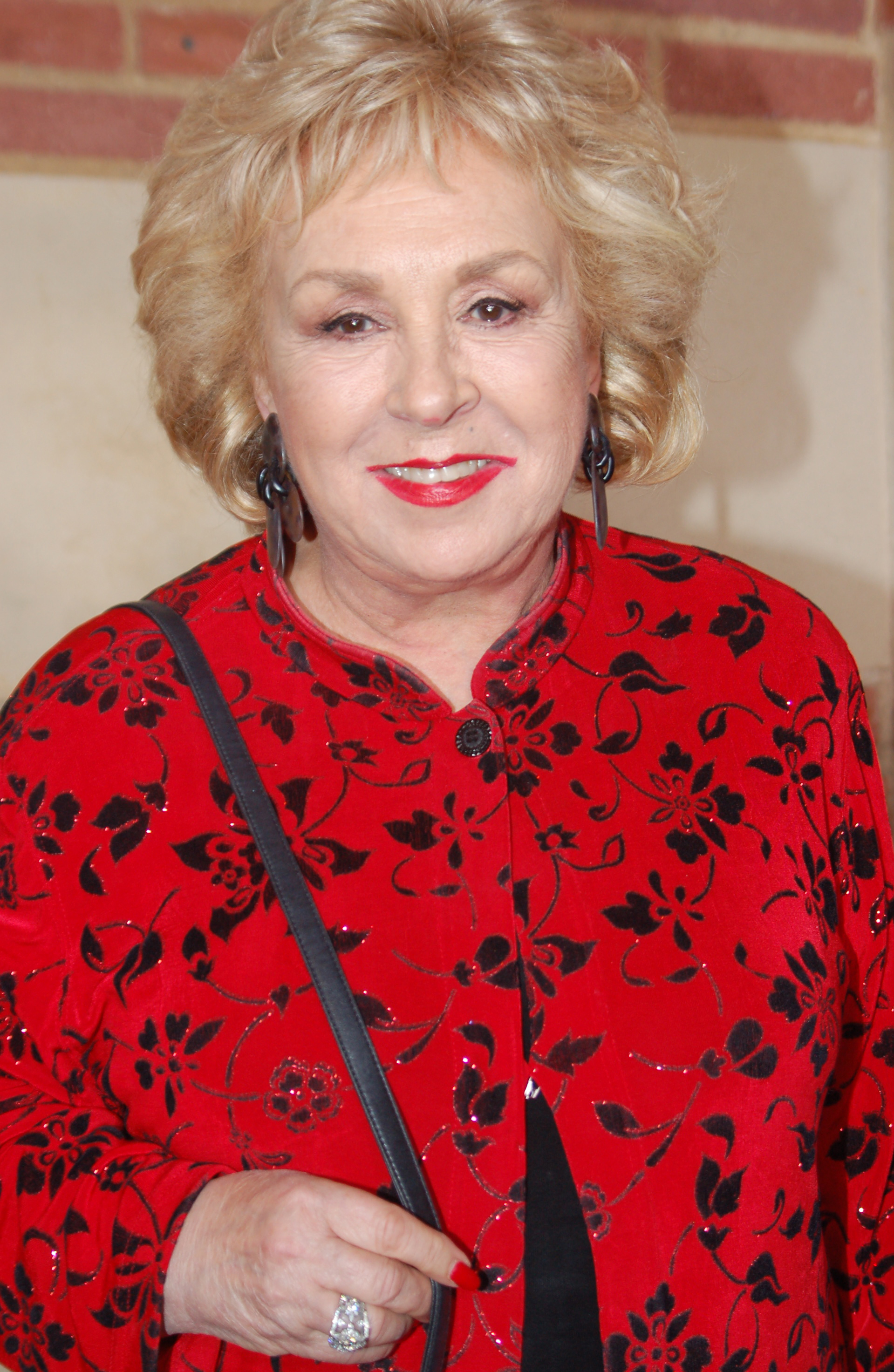
Doris Roberts

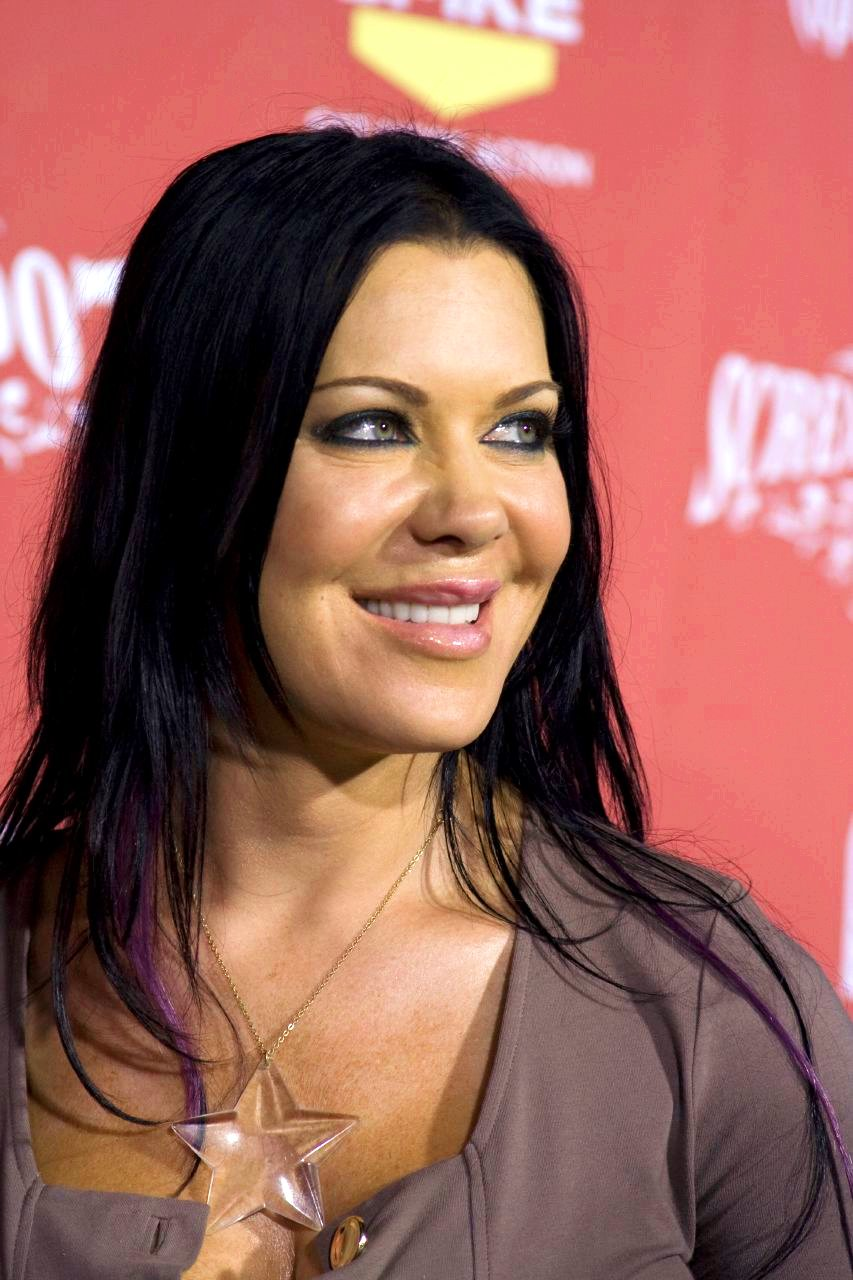
Chyna

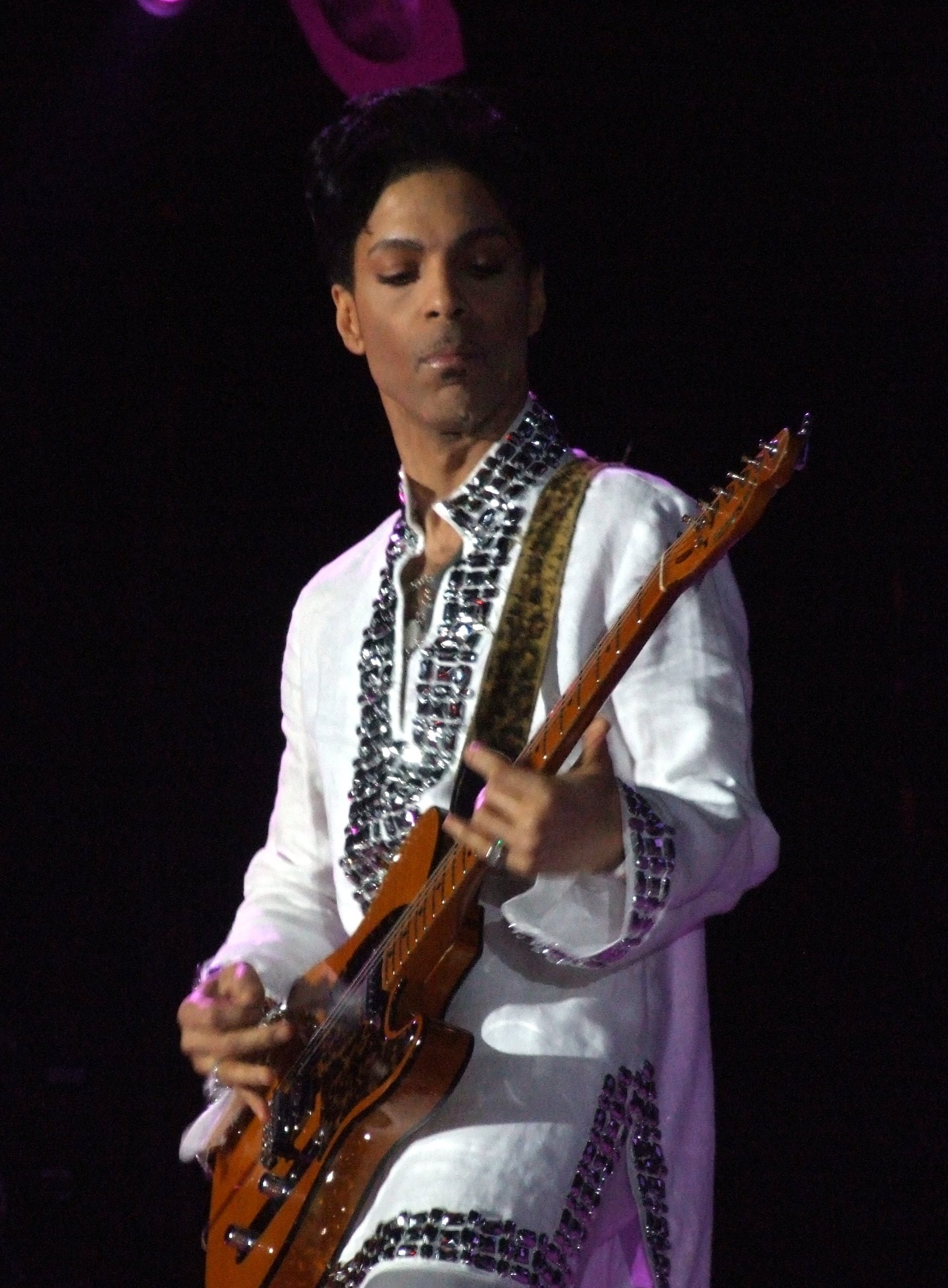
Prince

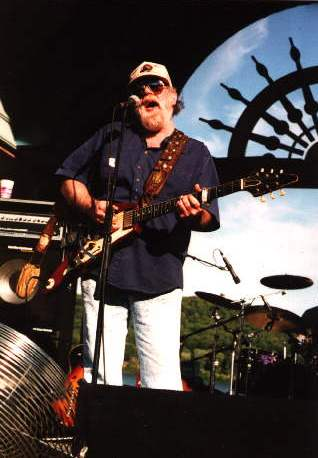
Lonnie Mack

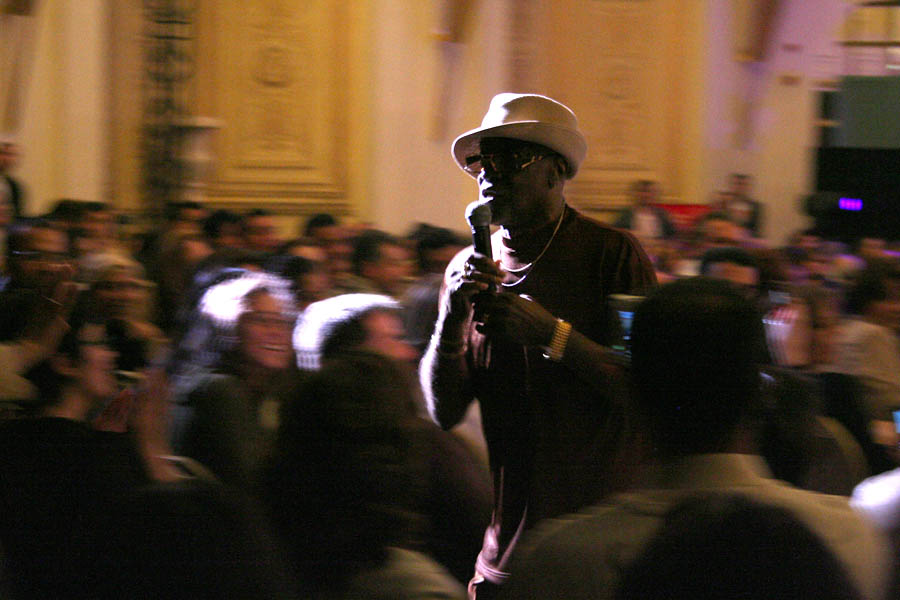
Billy Paul

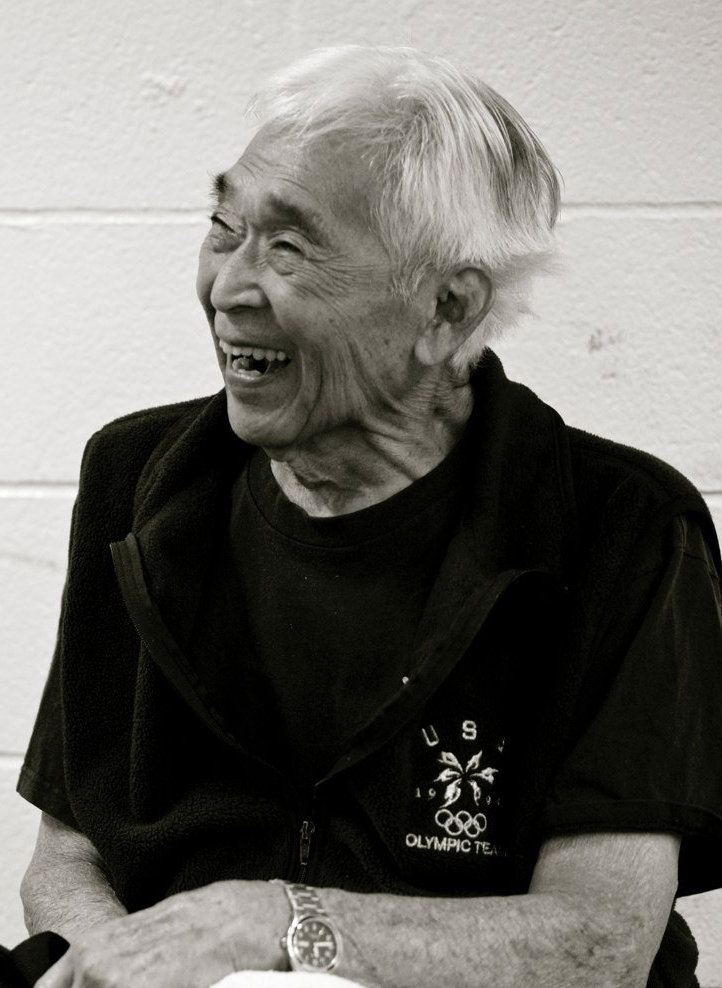
Tommy Kono

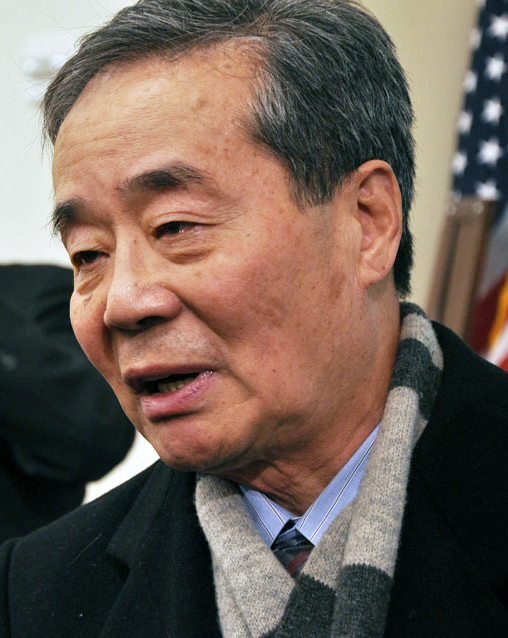
Harry Wu

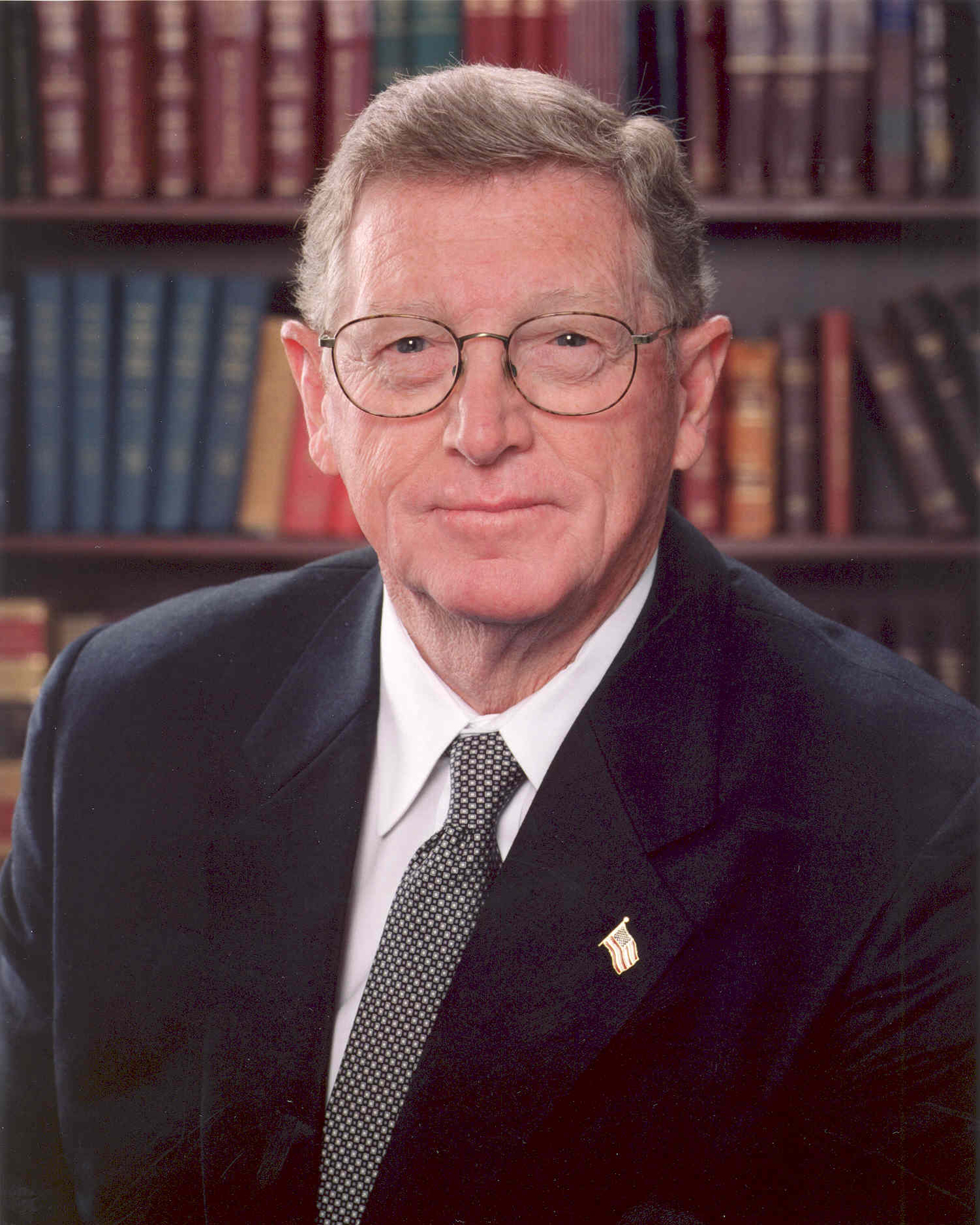
Conrad Burns

- April 1
  - Patricia Thompson, philosopher and author (born 1926)
  - Marjorie Peters, baseball player (born 1918)
  - Herbert Theodore Milburn, judge (born 1931)
  - Richard S. Kem, army general (born 1934)
  - Tom Coughlin, business executive and fraudster (born 1949)
- April 2
  - Amber Rayne, pornographic actress (born 1984)
  - Moreese Bickham, wrongfully convicted murderer and anti-death penalty activist (born 1917)
  - Rick Bartow, artist and sculptor (born 1946)
- April 3
  - Clarence Clifton Young, politician (born 1922)
  - Bill Henderson, jazz vocalist and actor (born 1926)
  - Henry Harpending, anthropologist (born 1944)
  - Robert Guinan, painter (born 1934)
  - Joe Medicine Crow, Crow historian and author (born 1913)
  - Ward Crutchfield, politician (born 1928)
  - Alex de Jesús, boxer (born 1983)
  - Erik Bauersfeld, radio dramatist and voice actor (born 1922)
- April 4
  - Mike Sandlock, baseball player (born 1915)
  - George Radosevich, football player (born 1928)
  - John Miller, politician (born 1947)
  - Carlo Mastrangelo, doo-wop singer (born 1937)
  - Archie Dees, basketball player (born 1936)
- April 5
  - Barbara Turner, screenwriter and actress (born 1936)
  - E. M. Nathanson, author (born 1928)
  - Leon Haywood, funk singer-songwriter and record producer (born 1942)
  - Roman Gribbs, 65th Mayor of Detroit, Michigan (born 1925)
- April 6
  - Murray Wier, basketball player (born 1926)
  - Pablo Lucio Vasquez, convicted murderer (born 1977)
  - Ogden Mills Phipps, financier, racehorse owner and breeder (born 1940)
  - Robert MacCrate, lawyer (born 1921)
  - Joel Kurtzman, economist (born 1947)
  - Merle Haggard, singer-songwriter and musician (born 1937)
  - Dennis Davis, drummer (born 1951)
- April 7
  - Blackjack Mulligan, professional wrestler (born 1942)
  - Vladimir Kagan, furniture designer (born 1927)
  - Frank E. Denholm, politician (born 1923)
  - Joe Freeman Britt, attorney and judge (born 1935)
- April 8
  - Daisy Lewellyn, reality television personality (born 1980)
  - Charles Hirsch, forensic pathologist (born 1937)
  - William Hamilton, cartoonist, playwright and novelist (born 1939)
  - Dick Alban, football player (born 1929)
- April 9
  - Will Smith, football player (born 1981)
  - Tony Conrad, experimental filmmaker and musician (born 1940)
  - Duane Clarridge, spy (born 1932)
  - Arthur Anderson, actor (born 1922)
- April 10
  - Wayne Southwick, surgeon and academic (born 1923)
  - Nicholas Hood, minister, politician and civil rights activist (born 1923)
  - Louis Gladstone, politician (born 1927)
- April 11
  - Ed Snider, sports executive (born 1933)
  - Anne Gould Hauberg, arts patron (born 1917)
  - Hokie Gajan, football player and broadcaster (born 1959)
  - Doug Banks, radio personality (born 1958)
- April 12
  - Spec Richardson, baseball executive (born 1923)
  - Balls Mahoney, professional wrestler (born 1972)
  - Bryce Jordan, 14th president of the Pennsylvania State University (born 1924)
  - Anne Jackson, actress, wife of Eli Wallach (born 1925)
  - David Gest, entertainer, producer and television personality (born 1953)
  - Paul Carey, broadcaster and sportscaster (born 1928)
  - Hector A. Cafferata Jr., soldier, Medal of Honor recipient (born 1929)
- April 13
  - Nera White, basketball player (born 1935)
  - Ray Thornton, politician and attorney (born 1928)
- April 14
  - Carl M. Vogel, politician (born 1955)
  - Dan Ireland, Canadian-born film director and producer (born 1958)
  - Fred Hayman, Swiss-born fashion retailer and entrepreneur (born 1925)
  - Francesco Guarraci, Italian-born mobster (born 1955)
- April 15
  - Frederick Mayer, German-born spy (born 1921)
  - Laura Liu, judge (born 1966)
- April 16
  - Maurice Kenny, Mohawk poet (born 1929)
  - William M. Gray, meteorologist (born 1929)
  - Rod Daniel, film and television director (born 1942)
  - Ron Bonham, basketball player (born 1942)
- April 17
  - Doris Roberts, actress (born 1925)
  - Clifton C. Garvin, businessman (born 1921)
- April 18
  - Scott Nimerfro, television writer and producer (born 1961)
  - Ben-Zion Gold, Polish-born rabbi (born 1923)
  - Bill Campbell, businessman and executive (born 1940)
  - Paul Busiek, physician and legislator (born 1923)
  - Brian Asawa, opera singer (born 1966)
- April 19
  - Pete Zorn, musician (born 1950)
  - Milt Pappas, baseball player (born 1939)
  - John McConathy, basketball player (born 1930)
  - Richard Lyons, musician (born 1959)
  - Walter Kohn, Austrian-born physicist, Nobel Prize laureate (born 1923)
- April 20
  - Dwayne Washington, basketball player (born 1964)
  - Harry Perkowski, baseball player (born 1922)
  - Velda González, actress and politician (born 1933)
  - Chyna, professional wrestler, bodybuilder and actress (born 1969)
  - Solomon Blatt Jr., judge (born 1921)
- April 21
  - Peter Ruckman, Independent Baptist pastor (born 1921)
  - Prince, singer, songwriter, musician and actor (born 1958)
  - Michelle McNamara, crime writer, wife of Patton Oswalt (born 1970)
  - Lonnie Mack, singer and guitarist (born 1941)
- April 22
  - Norman Kleiss, American naval officer and World War II veteran (b. 1916)
  - Jory Prum, audio engineer (born 1975)
- April 23
  - Gerald Crosier, 82, politician (born 1933).
  - Horace Ward, judge (born 1927)
  - Tom Muecke, football player (born 1963)
  - Ron Brace, football player (born 1986)
- April 24
  - George Alexis Weymouth, artist and conservationist (born 1936)
  - Terry Redlin, artist (born 1937)
  - Billy Paul, R&B singer (born 1934)
  - Lizette Parker, Mayor of Teaneck, New Jersey (born 1972)
  - Tommy Kono, weightlifter (born 1930)
  - Steve Julian, radio host (born 1958)
  - Perry O. Hooper Sr., jurist (born 1925)
  - Manuel de la Torre, Spanish-born golf instructor (born 1921)
- April 25 – Joe Blahak, football player (born 1950)
- April 26
  - Harry Wu, Chinese-born human rights activist (born 1937)
  - James H. Ware, biostatistician (born 1941)
  - Ozzie Silna, basketball executive (born 1932)
  - Winston Hill, football player (born 1941)
- April 27
  - Willie L. Williams, police commissioner (born 1943)
  - Harold Cohen, British-born digital artist (born 1928)
- April 28
  - Blackie Sherrod, sportswriter (born 1919)
  - Charles Gatewood, photographer (born 1942)
  - Joe Durham, baseball player (born 1931)
  - Conrad Burns, U.S. Senator (1989–2007) (born 1935)
- April 29 – Don White, race car driver (born 1926)
- April 30
  - Peter Thomas, television announcer and narrator (born 1924)
  - Tracy Scott, script supervisor (born 1969)
  - Marisol Escobar, French-born artist and sculptor (born 1930)
  - Wayne Crawford, actor, producer, director and screenwriter (born 1942)
  - Daniel Berrigan, Jesuit priest and peace activist (born 1921)
  - Daniel Aaron, writer and academic, co-founder of the Library of America (born 1912)

=== May ===
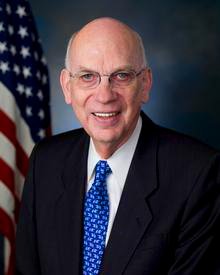
Bob Bennett

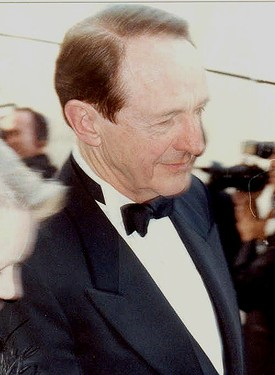
William Schallert

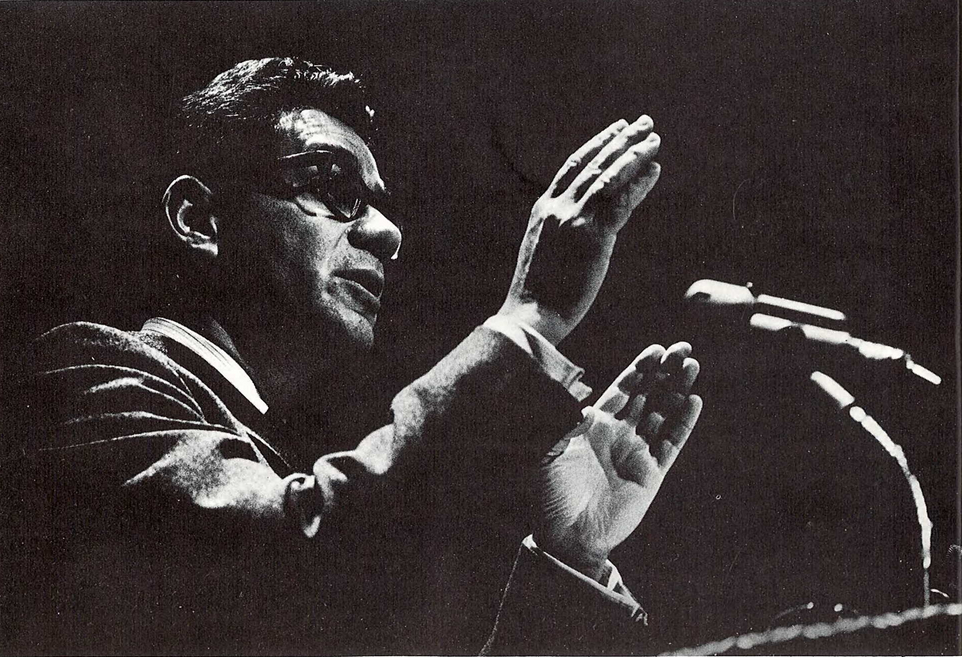
Mark Lane

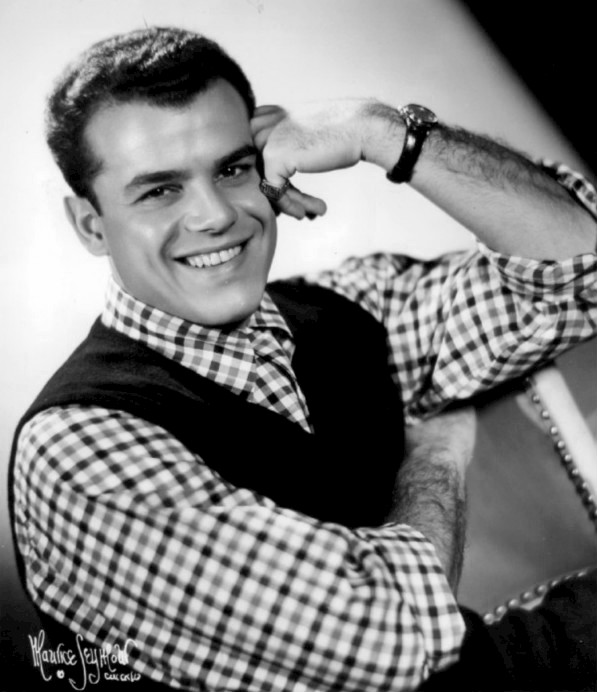
Julius La Rosa

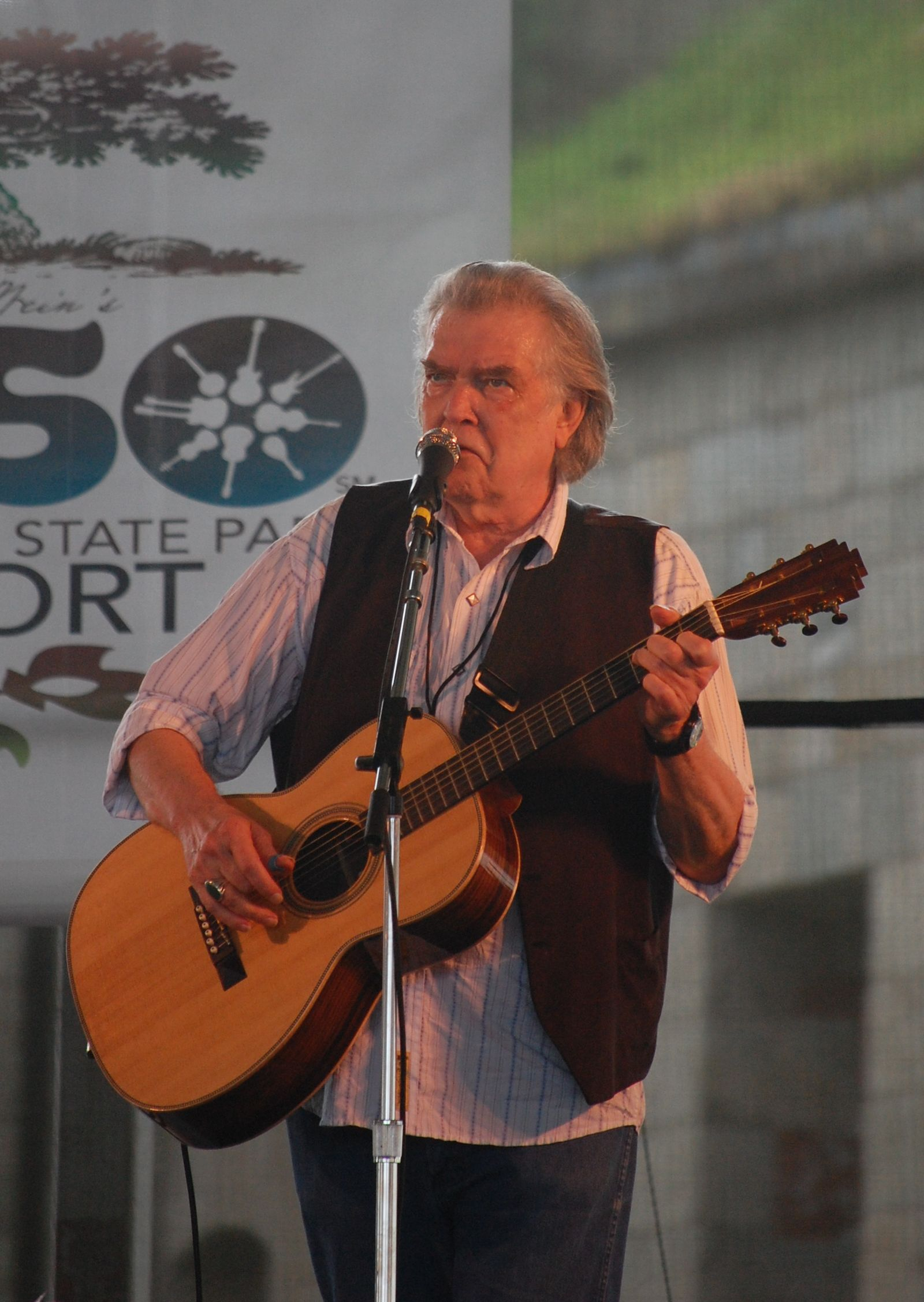
Guy Clark

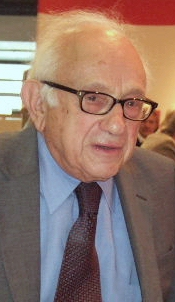
Fritz Stern

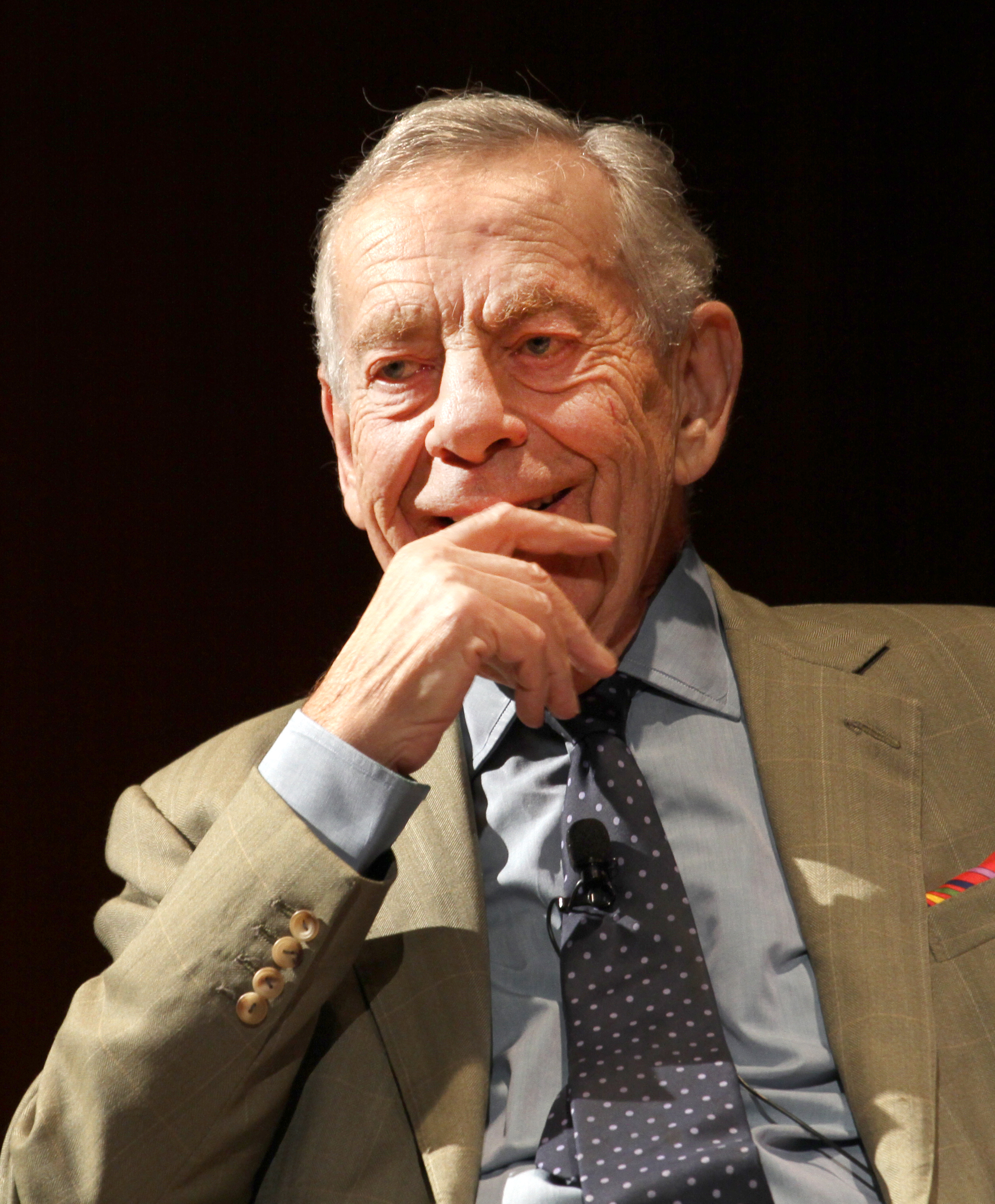
Morley Safer

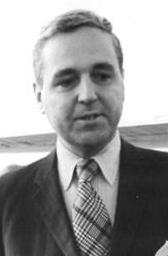
Brandon Grove

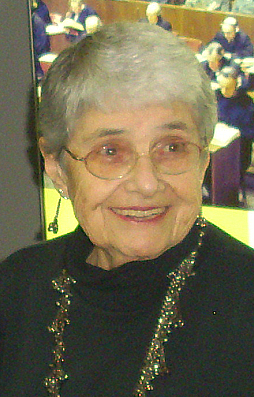
Hedy Epstein

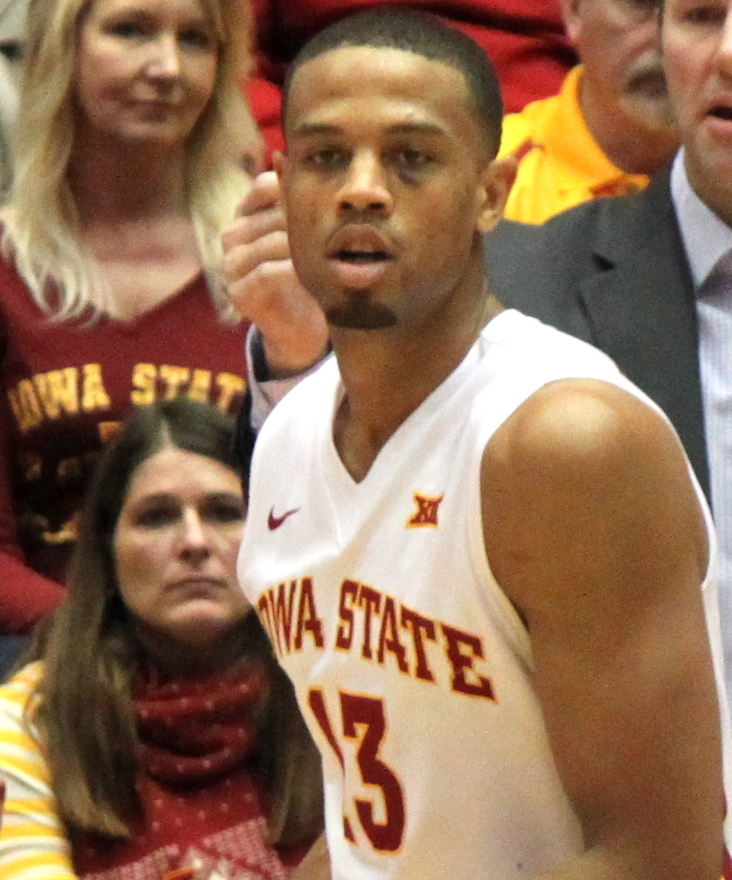
Bryce Dejean-Jones

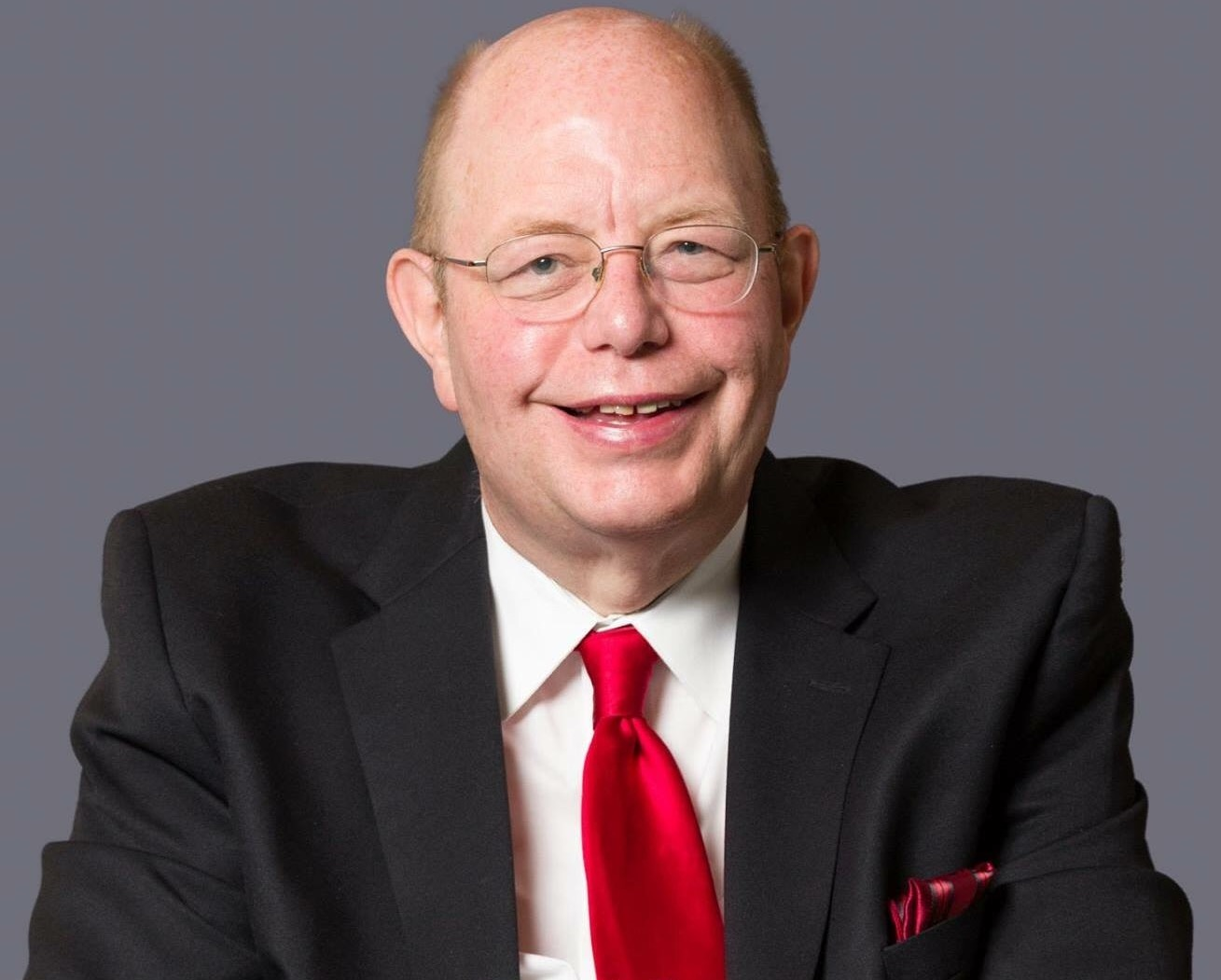
Don McNay

- May 1
  - Doug Raney, jazz guitarist, son of Jimmy Raney (born 1956)
  - Solomon W. Golomb, mathematician and engineer (born 1932)
- May 2
  - Gordie Sundin, baseball player (born 1937)
  - Afeni Shakur, political activist and businesswoman, mother of Tupac Shakur (born 1947)
  - Jacky Lee, football player (born 1938)
  - Al Ferrari, basketball player (born 1933)
  - Mel Bartholomew, inventor and businessman (born 1932)
- May 3
  - Ret Turner, costume designer (born 1929)
  - Ian Sander, film and television producer (born 1947)
  - Nicolas Noxon, documentary filmmaker (born 1936)
  - Thomas W. Libous, politician (born 1953)
  - Frank Levingston, supercentenarian (born 1905)
  - Abel Fernandez, actor (born 1930)
  - Paul Boutelle, politician (born 1934)
- May 4
  - Jordan Parsons, mixed martial artist (born 1990)
  - Ursula Mamlok, German-born composer (born 1923)
  - Howard King, public address announcer (born 1933)
  - Karl Butzer, German-born geographer (born 1934)
  - Bob Bennett, U.S. Senator (1993–2011) (born 1933)
  - Blas Avena, mixed martial artist (born 1983)
- May 5
  - Rollin Dart, CEO of Dart National Bank (born 1925)
  - Dick Estell, radio host (born 1920)
- May 6
  - Rickey Smith, singer and reality show contestant (born 1979)
  - Pierre, African penguin (born 1983)
  - Candye Kane, blues singer-songwriter and actress (born 1961)
  - Johnny Joannou, politician (born 1940)
  - David Hall, 20th Governor of Oklahoma (born 1930)
  - Christopher T. Carley, real estate developer (born 1943)
- May 7
  - John Stabb, punk vocalist (born 1961)
  - Michael S. Harper, poet (born 1938)
  - Ann Day, politician (born 1938)
- May 8
  - John Young, baseball player, scout and executive (born 1949)
  - Nick Lashaway, actor (born 1988)
  - William Schallert, actor and President of SAG (1979–1981) (born 1922)
  - Louisa Chase, Panamanian-born painter and printmaker (born 1951)
  - John Bradshaw, motivational writer and speaker (born 1933)
  - Tom M. Apostol, mathematician (born 1923)
- May 9
  - Ronald W. Walker, historian (born 1939)
  - Karl Maramorosch, Austrian-born virologist (born 1915)
  - Chuck Curtis, football coach (born 1935)
- May 10 – Mark Lane, lawyer, politician, civil rights activist and author (born 1927)
- May 11
  - Michael Ratner, attorney (born 1943)
  - Katherine Dunn, novelist (born 1945)
- May 12
  - Peter J. Liacouras, President of Temple University (born 1931)
  - Del Latta, politician (born 1920)
  - Julius La Rosa, singer (born 1930)
  - Susannah Mushatt Jones, supercentenarian, last known American born in the 19th century (born 1899)
- May 13
  - James M. Shuart, President of Hofstra University (born 1931)
  - Dick McAuliffe, baseball player (born 1939)
  - Rabbit Kekai, surfer (born 1920)
  - Sammy Ellis, baseball player (born 1941)
  - Buster Cooper, jazz trombonist (born 1929)
  - Bill Backer, advertising executive (born 1926)
  - Murray A. Straus, American sociologist and professor (University of New Hampshire), creator of the Conflict tactics scale (born 1926)
- May 14 – Monteagle Stearns, U.S. Ambassador to Greece (1981–1985) and Ivory Coast (1976–1979) (born 1924)
- May 16
  - Robert "Bobby" Freeman, politician (born 1934)
  - Jim McMillian, basketball player (born 1948)
  - Julia Meade, actress (born 1925)
  - Emilio Navaira, country and Tejano singer (born 1962)
  - Mamie Rallins, hurdler (born 1941)
  - Jack Unruh, commercial illustrator (born 1935)
- May 17 – Guy Clark, singer-songwriter, Grammy winner (2014) (born 1941).
- May 18
  - Elaine Abraham, Tlingit elder and nurse (born 1929)
  - Fritz Stern, German-born historian (born 1926)
  - Susan Tolchin, political scientist (born 1941)
- May 19
  - Irving Benson, actor and comedian (born 1914)
  - John Berry, musician (born 1963)
  - Jim Ray Hart, baseball player (born 1941)
  - Morley Safer, Canadian-born journalist (born 1931)
  - Alan Young, British actor, comedian, and host (born 1919)
- May 20
  - Patricia M. Derian, human rights activist (born 1929)
  - Brandon Grove, U.S. Ambassador to East Germany and Zaire (1984–1987) (born 1929)
  - Albert M. Sackett, Navy rear admiral (born 1920)
  - Wheelock Whitney Jr., sports executive (born 1926)
- May 21
  - Homeboykris, racehorse (born 2007)
  - Nick Menza, German-born drummer (born 1964)
- May 22
  - Tom DeLeone, football player (born 1950)
  - George Wildman, cartoonist (born 1927)
- May 23 – Joe Fleishaker, actor (born 1954)
- May 24
  - Suzanne Corkin, neuroscientist (born 1937)
  - Buck Kartalian, actor (born 1922)
  - Mell Lazarus, cartoonist (born 1927)
  - Hughes Oliphant Old, theologian (born 1933)
- May 25 – Nancy Dow, actress and model (born 1936)
- May 26
  - Cassandra Butts, lawyer (born 1965)
  - Hedy Epstein, German-born Holocaust survivor and political activist (born 1924)
  - Lou Grasmick, baseball player (born 1924)
  - Iana Kasian, Ukrainian-born prosecutor and murder victim (born 1986)
  - Gustav Meier, Swiss-born conductor (born 1929)
  - Angela Paton, actress (born 1930)
  - Coe Swobe, politician, member of the Nevada Senate (1966–1974) (born 1929)
  - Bob Williams, football player (born 1930)
- May 27
  - Michael Dann, television executive (born 1921)
  - Louise Erickson, baseball player (born 1929)
  - Frank Modell, cartoonist (born 1917)
  - Morton White, philosopher (born 1917)
- May 28
  - Bryce Dejean-Jones, basketball player (born 1992)
  - Peter DeTroy, attorney (born 1948)
  - M. Brendan Fleming, politician, Mayor of Lowell, Massachusetts (1982–1984) (born 1926)
  - Harambe, endangered gorilla (born 1999)
- May 29
  - T. Marshall Hahn, educator and executive (born 1926)
  - Ralph Ketner, businessman and philanthropist (born 1920)
  - Don McNay, financial author (born 1959)
- May 30 – C. Michael Harper, executive (born 1927)
- May 31
  - Fred Catona, business founder and chief marketing strategist (born 1946)
  - Jan Crouch, televangelist and broadcasting executive (born 1928)
  - David Tod Roy, sinologist and translator (born 1933)

=== June ===
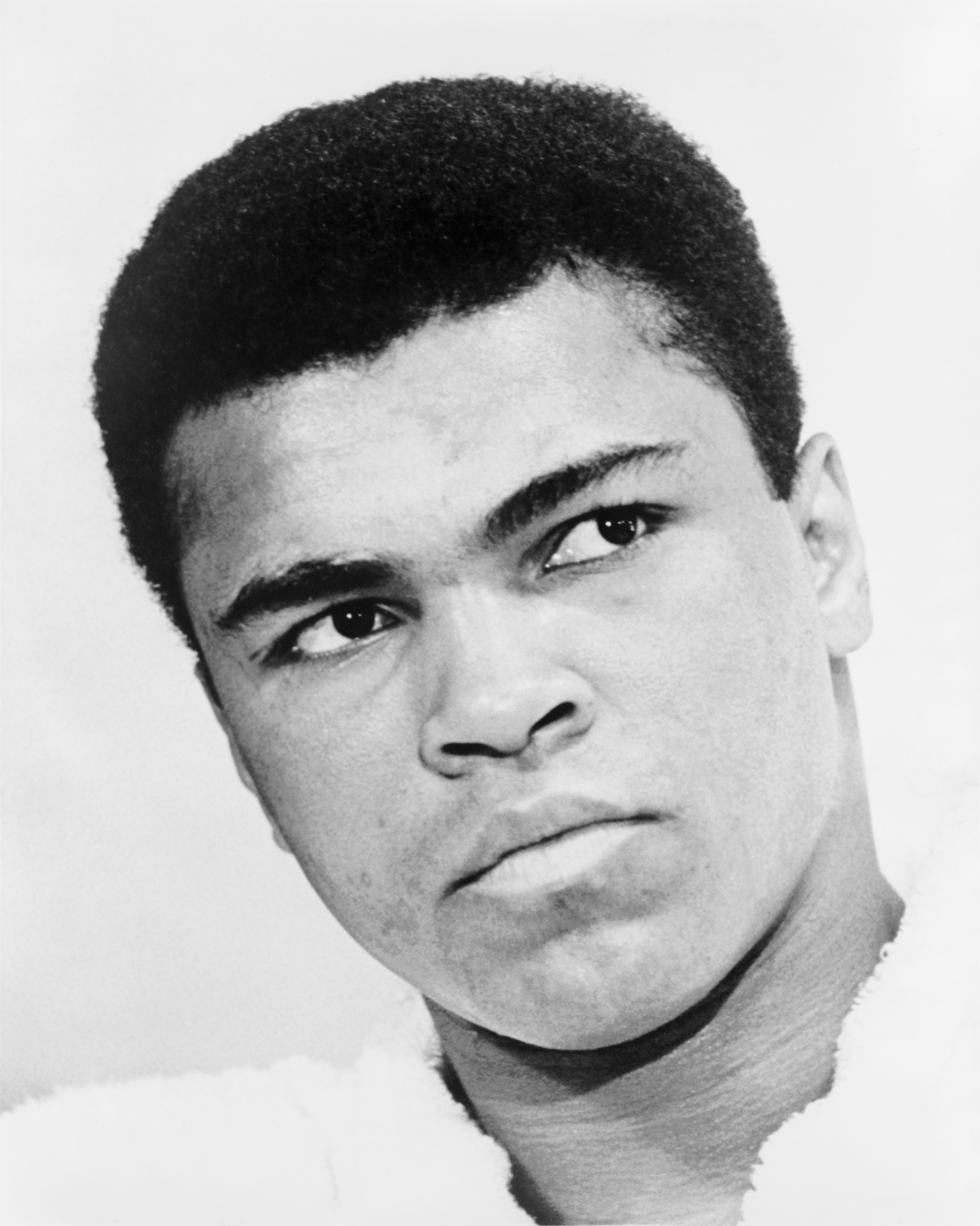
Muhammad Ali

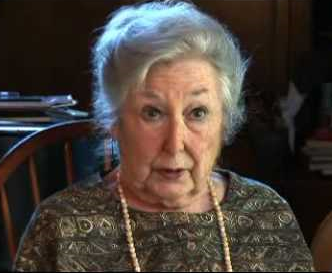
Phyllis Curtin

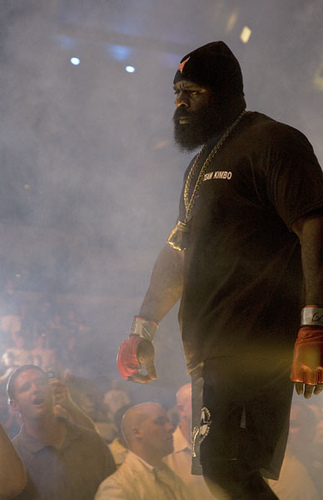
Kimbo Slice

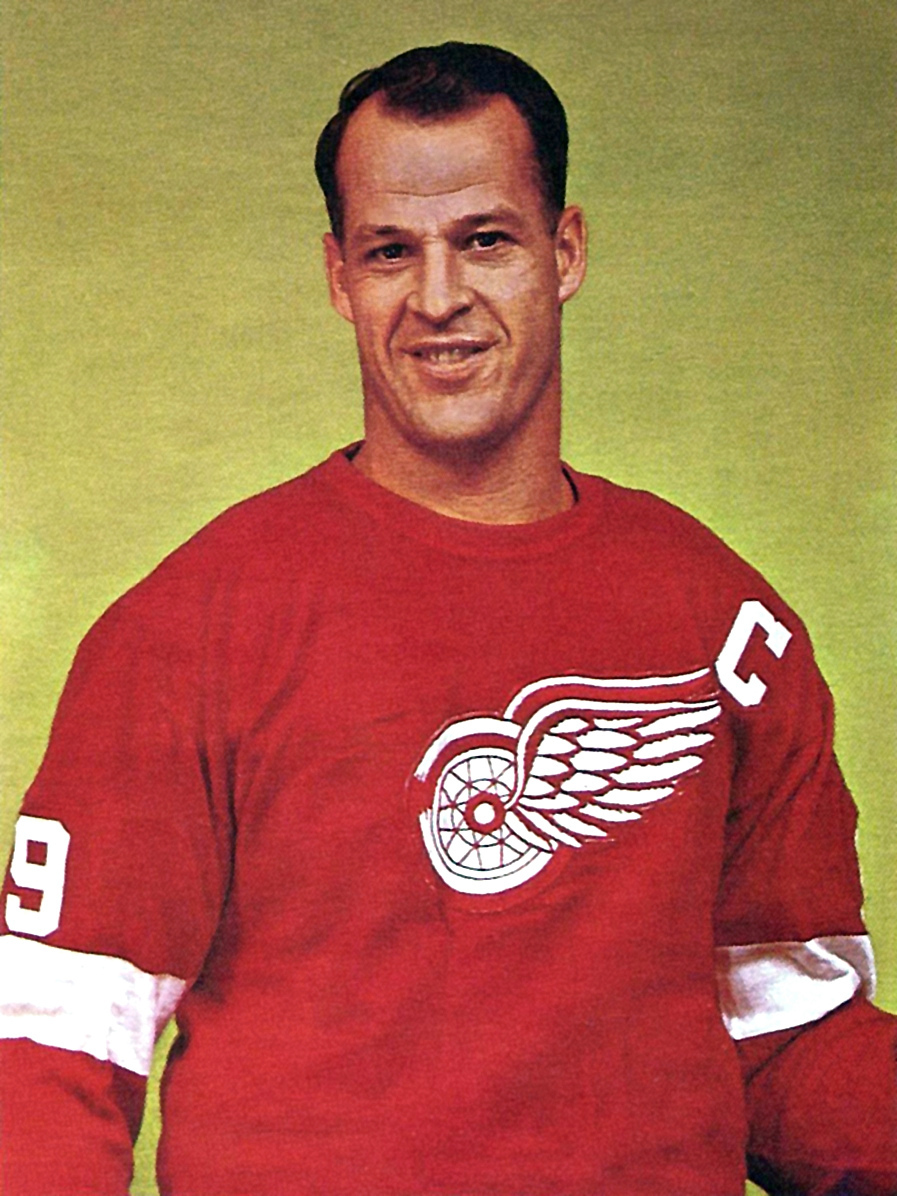
Gordie Howe

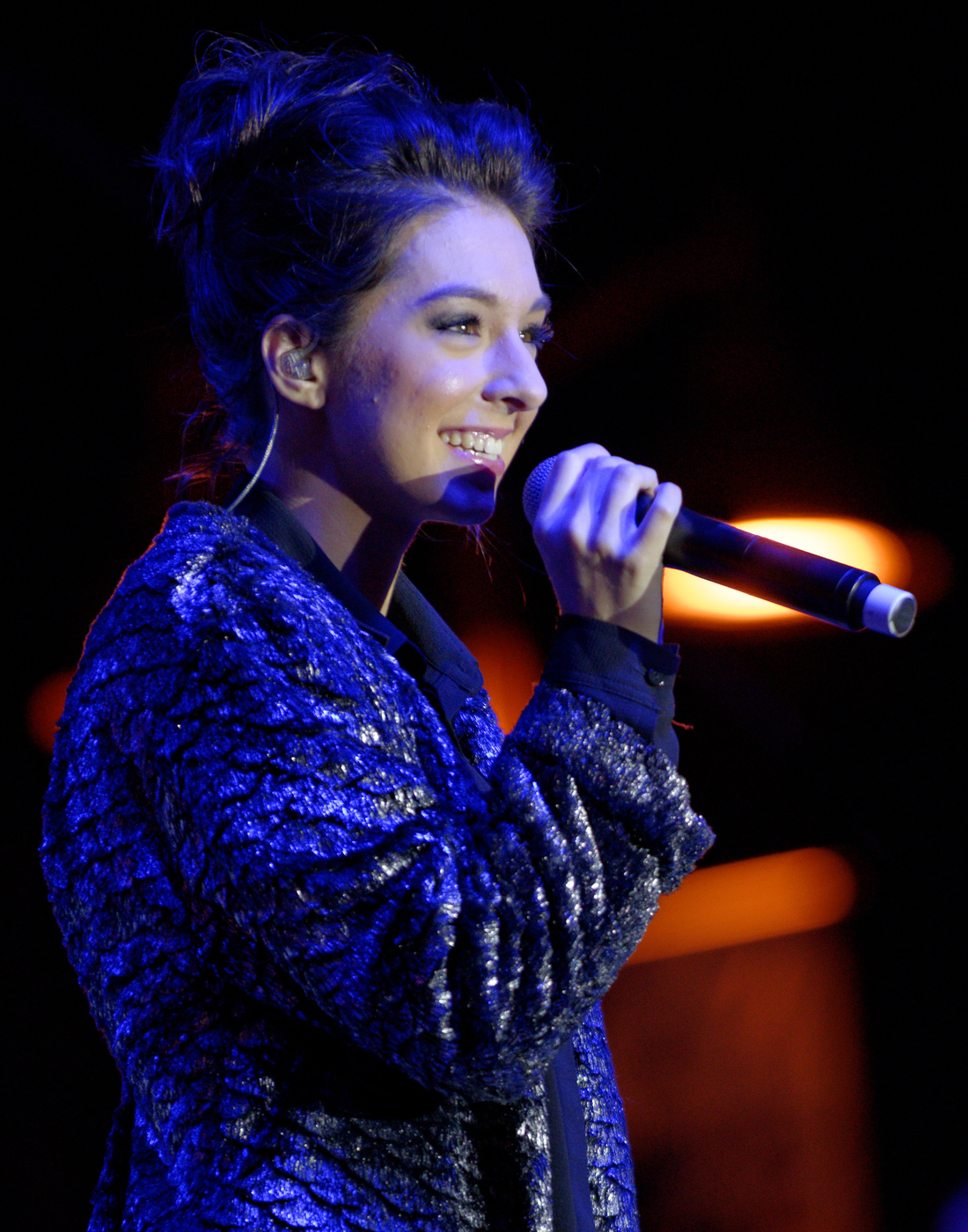
Christina Grimmie

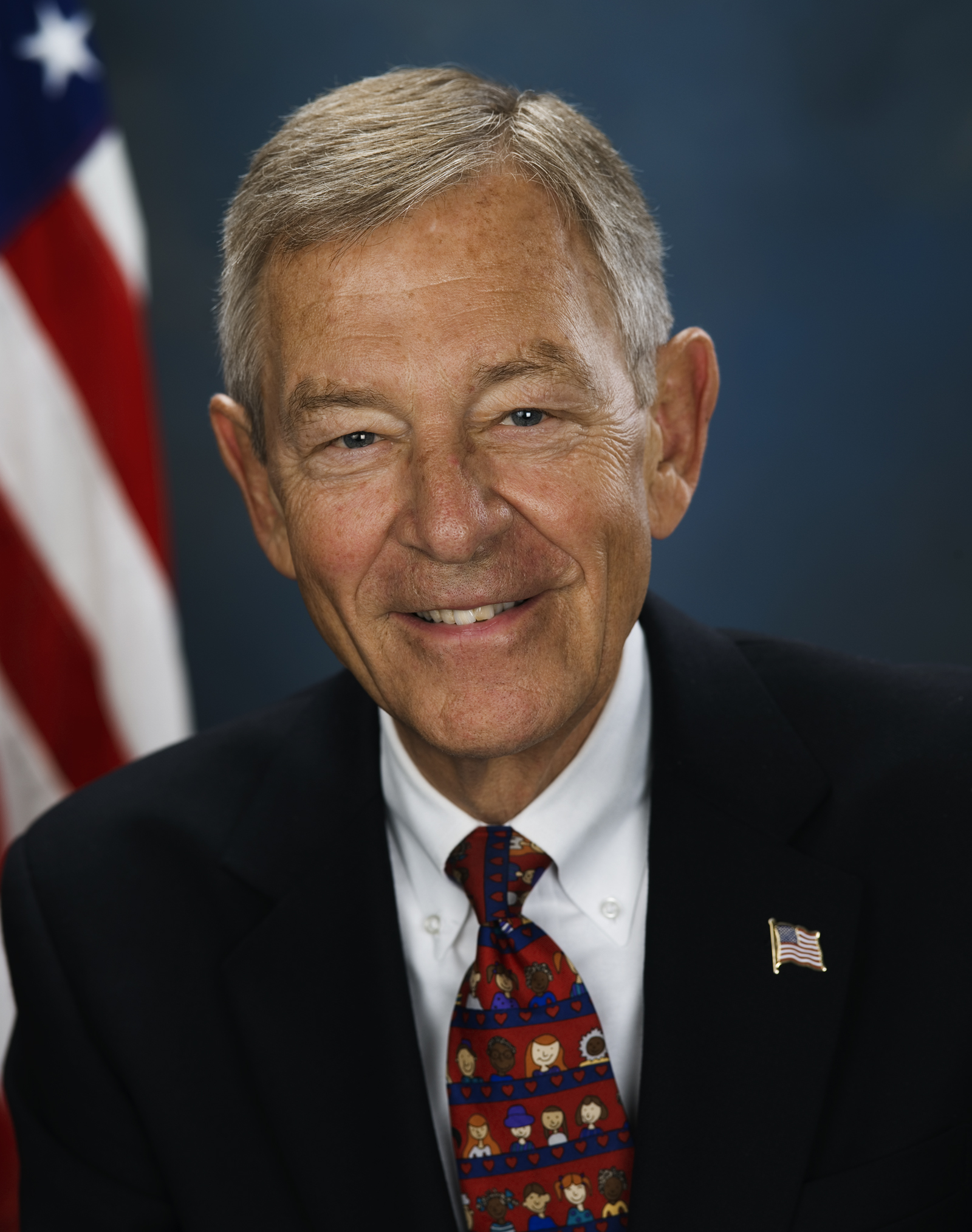
George Voinovich

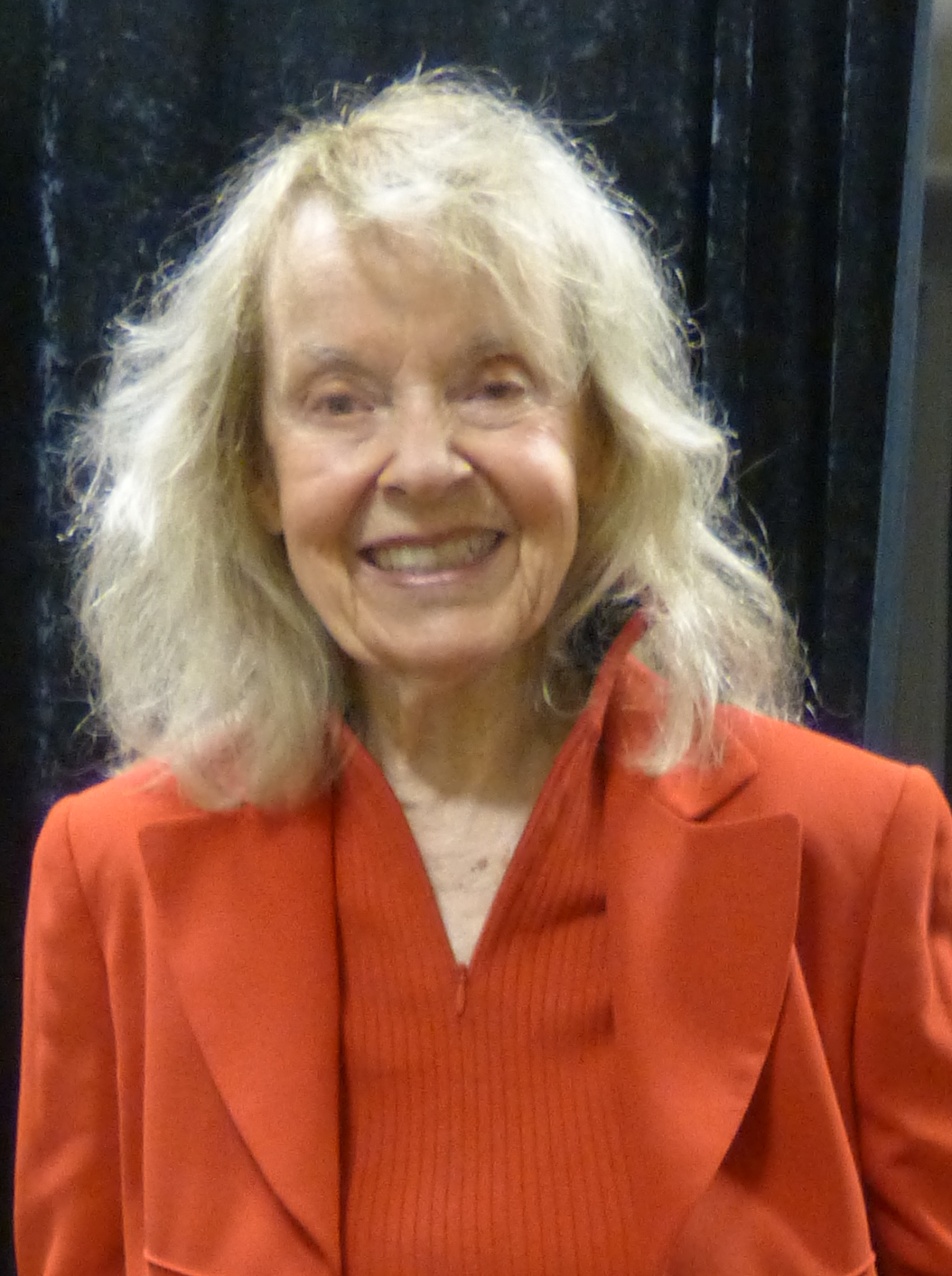
Janet Waldo

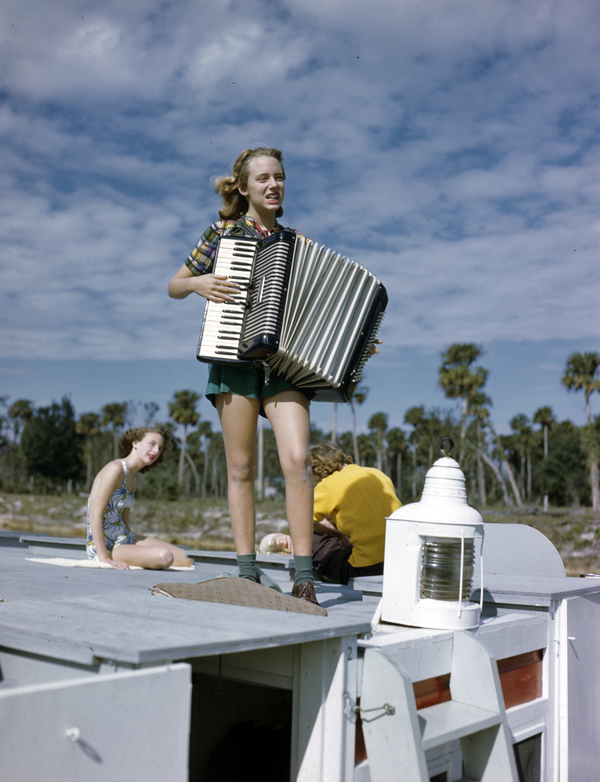
Lois Duncan

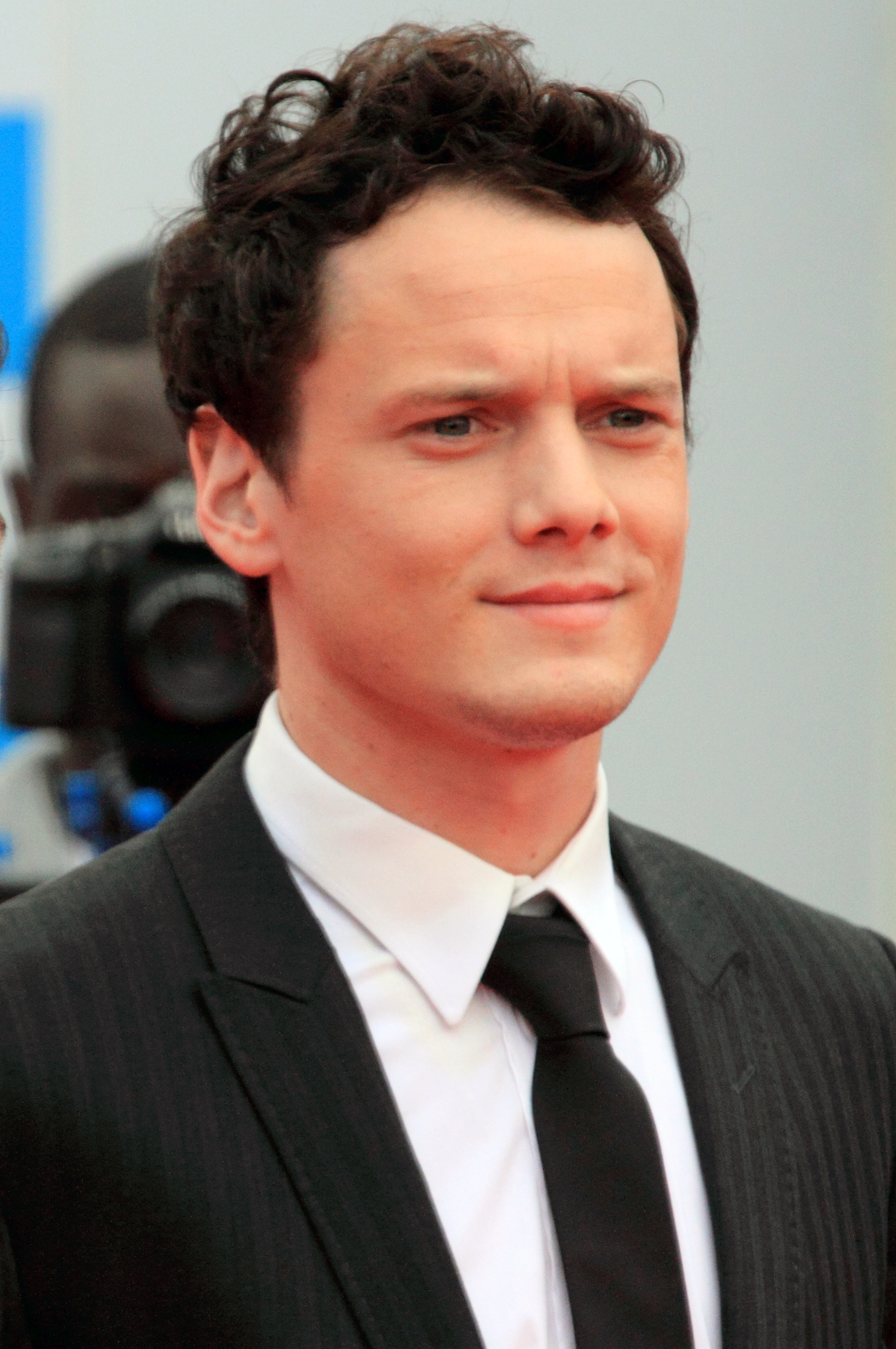
Anton Yelchin

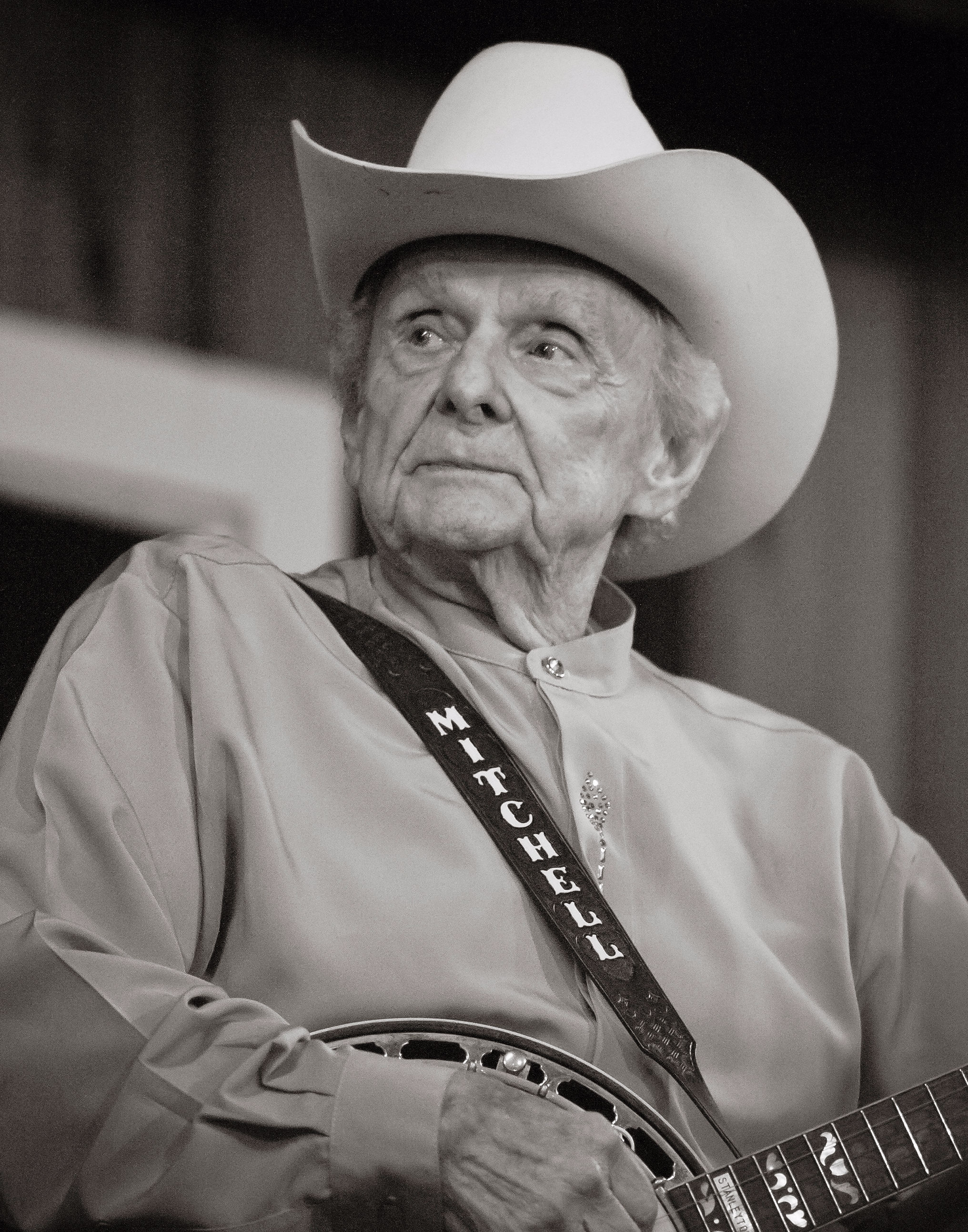
Ralph Stanley

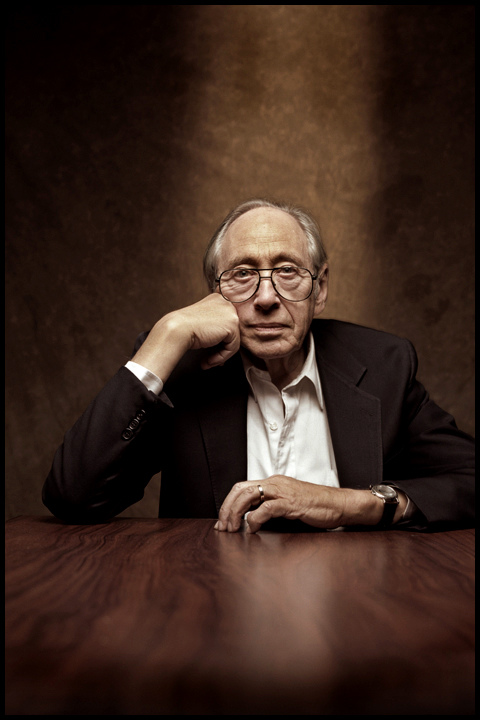
Alvin Toffler

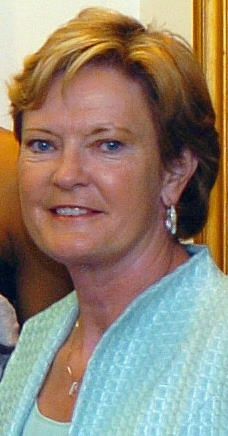
Pat Summitt

- June 1
  - Roger Enrico, businessman (born 1944)
  - Boyce F. Martin Jr., judge, Chief Judge of the United States Court of Appeals for the Sixth Circuit (1996–2003) (born 1935)
- June 2
  - Donny Everett, baseball player (born 1997)
  - Wayne Kingery, football player (born 1927)
  - Lee Pfund, baseball player and college baseball and basketball coach (born 1919)
- June 3
  - Muhammad Ali, boxer (born 1942)
  - Henry Childs, football player (born 1951)
- June 4
  - Phyllis Curtin, operatic soprano (born 1921)
  - Bill Richmond, film and television writer and producer (born 1921)
  - William Wright, author, editor, and playwright (born 1930)
- June 5
  - Jerome Bruner, psychologist (born 1915)
  - David Lamb, journalist (born 1940)
  - Cedric Robinson, political scientist and activist (born 1940)
  - Eleanor Zelliot, writer and educator (born 1926)
- June 6
  - Helen Fabela Chávez, labor unionist and activist (born 1928)
  - Theresa Saldana, actress (born 1954)
  - Kimbo Slice, Bahamian-born mixed martial artist and boxer (born 1974)
- June 7
  - Leonard Hill, television producer and real estate developer (born 1947)
  - Thomas Perkins, businessman (born 1932)
  - Sean Rooks, basketball player and coach (born 1969)
  - Bryan Wiedmeier, football executive (born 1959)
- June 9
  - J. Reilly Lewis, choral conductor and organist (born 1944)
  - Brooks Thompson, basketball player and coach (born 1970)
- June 10
  - Mary Feik, aviator (born 1924)
  - Gordie Howe, hockey player (b.1928)
- June 11
  - Gilbert Blue, Catawba Nation chief (1973–2007) (born 1933)
  - Stacey Castor, convicted murderer (born 1967)
  - Christina Grimmie, singer and songwriter (born 1994)
  - Bryan Robinson, football player (born 1974)
- June 12
  - Michelle Cliff, Jamaican-born author (born 1946)
  - Earl Faison, football player (born 1939)
  - Curley Johnson, football player (born 1935)
  - Danny Kopec, chess player (born 1954)
  - Omar Mateen, terrorist and mass murderer (born 1986)
  - George Voinovich, Governor of Ohio (1991–98) and Senator from Ohio (1999–2011) (born 1936)
  - Janet Waldo, actress and voice artist (born 1920)
  - 49 victims of the Pulse nightclub massacre
- June 13
  - Anahid Ajemian, violinist (born 1924)
  - Michu Meszaros, Hungarian-born actor (born 1939)
  - Chips Moman, record producer, guitarist, and songwriter (born 1937)
  - Robert T. Paine, ecologist (born 1933)
  - Gregory Rabassa, literary translator (born 1922)
- June 14
  - Melvin Dwork, interior designer and LGBT rights activist (born 1922)
  - Ronnie Claire Edwards, actress (born 1933)
  - Ann Morgan Guilbert, actress (born 1928)
- June 15
  - Lois Duncan, author (born 1934)
  - Richard Selzer, surgeon and author (born 1928)
- June 16
  - Irving Moskowitz, businessman and philanthropist (born 1928)
  - Bill Berkson, poet and literary critic (born 1939)
- June 17
  - Thomas Ashley Graves Jr., academic (born 1924)
  - Ron Lester, actor (born 1970)
  - David Morgenthaler, businessman (born 1919)
- June 18
  - Curt Hofstad, politician (born 1946)
  - Kitty Rhoades, politician (born 1951)
  - Joe Schaffernoth, baseball player (born 1937)
- June 19
  - David Johnson, Australian-born businessman (born 1933)
  - Anton Yelchin, Soviet-born actor (born 1989)
- June 20
  - Frank Chapot, equestrian (born 1932)
  - Alvin Endt, educator and politician (born 1933)
  - Bill Ham, music manager and record producer (born 1937)
  - Rich Olive, politician (born 1949)
  - Chayito Valdez, Mexican-born singer and actress (born 1945)
- June 21
  - Dan Daniel, radio personality (born 1934)
  - Jack Fuller, journalist, novelist, and publisher (born 1946)
  - Wayne Jackson, R&B trumpeter (born 1941)
  - Kenworth Moffett, art curator and museum director (born 1934)
- June 22
  - Joan Acker, sociologist and women's rights activist (born 1924)
  - Jim Boyd, singer-songwriter (born 1956)
- June 23
  - Mike Flynn, online journalist and conservative activist (born 1968)
  - James Green, labor historian and activist (born 1944)
  - Michael Herr, author and war correspondent (born 1940)
  - Stuart Nisbet, actor (born 1934)
  - Ralph Stanley, bluegrass singer and banjoist (born 1927)
- June 24
  - Chaim Avrohom Horowitz, Polish-born rabbi (born 1933)
  - Bernie Worrell, funk keyboardist (born 1944)
- June 25
  - Raymond Bateman, politician (born 1927)
  - Bill Cunningham, street and fashion photographer (born 1929)
  - Jim Hickman, baseball player (born 1937)
  - Peter Hutton, experimental filmmaker (born 1944)
  - Hal Lear, basketball player (born 1935)
- June 26
  - Jona Goldrich, Polish-born real estate developer and philanthropist (born 1927)
  - Barbara Goldsmith, author, journalist, editor, and philanthropist (born 1931)
  - John J. Santucci, lawyer and politician (born 1931)
- June 27
  - Simon Ramo, engineer, businessman, and author (born 1913)
  - Mack Rice, singer and songwriter (born 1933)
  - Alvin Toffler, writer and futurist (born 1928)
- June 28
  - Scotty Moore, rock and roll guitarist (born 1931)
  - Buddy Ryan, football coach (born 1934)
  - Pat Summitt, women's basketball coach (born 1952)
  - Zurlon Tipton, football player (born 1990)
- June 29
  - Stanley Gault, businessman and philanthropist (born 1929)
  - Irving Gottesman, psychologist (born 1930)
  - Carl Haas, auto racing driver and owner (born 1929)
  - Edward L. Salmon Jr., Episcopal bishop (born 1934)
  - Rob Wasserman, rock double-bassist (born 1952)
- June 30
  - Don Friedman, jazz pianist (born 1935)
  - Joe Scott, football player (born 1926)

=== July ===
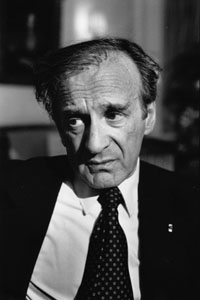
Elie Wiesel

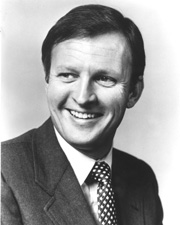
William L. Armstrong

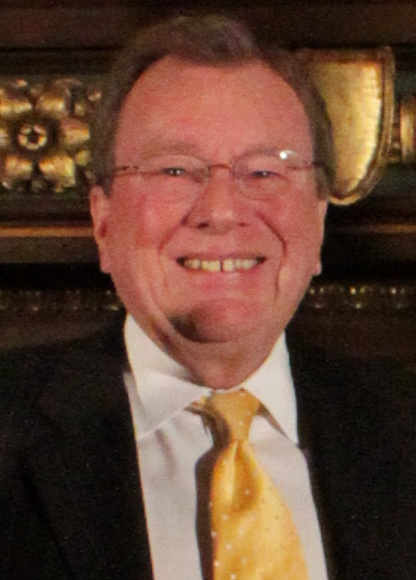
Jim Metzen

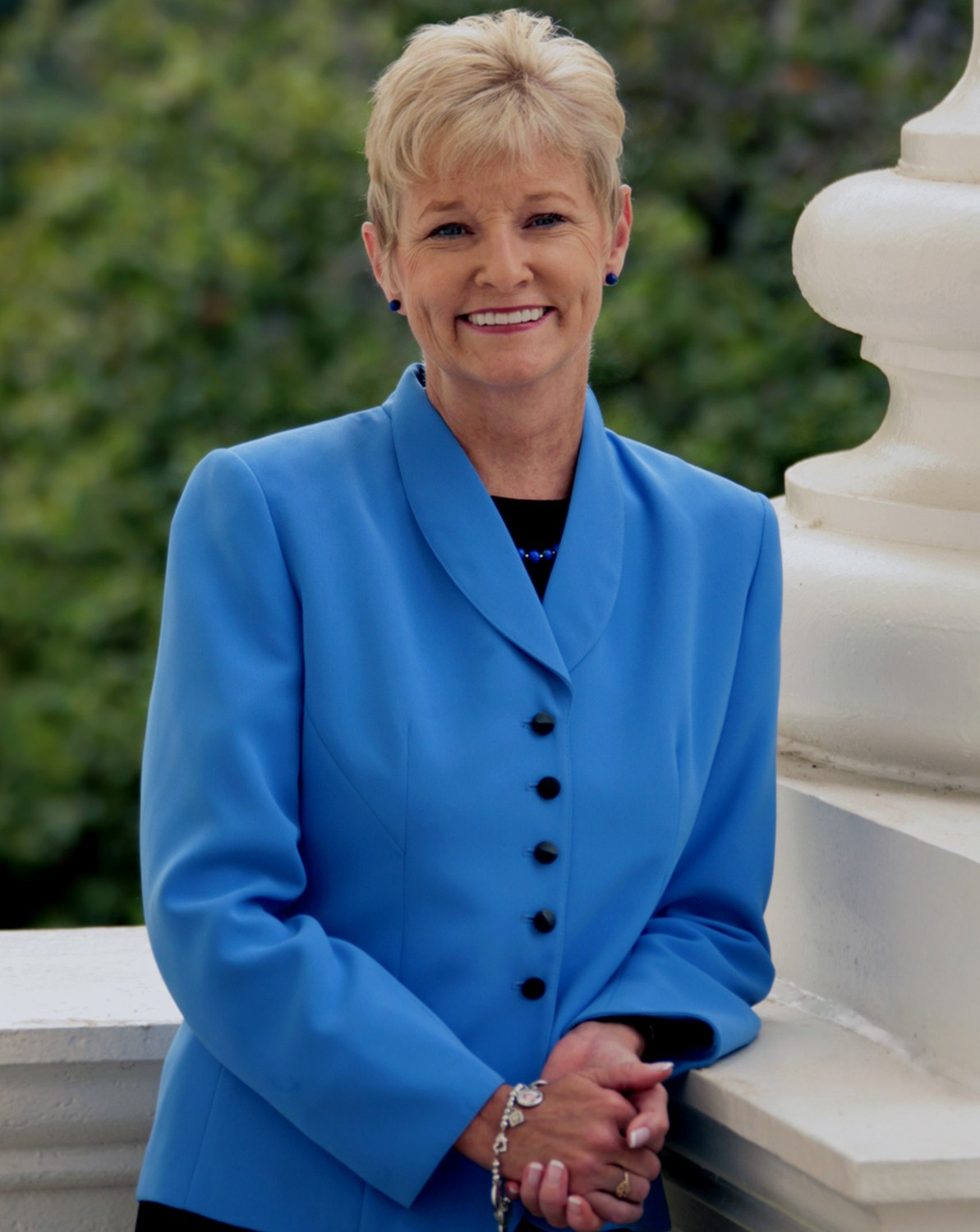
Sharon Runner

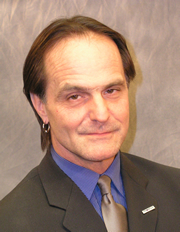
Jeffrey Montgomery

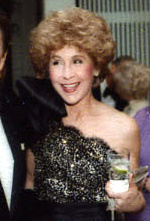
Betsy Bloomingdale

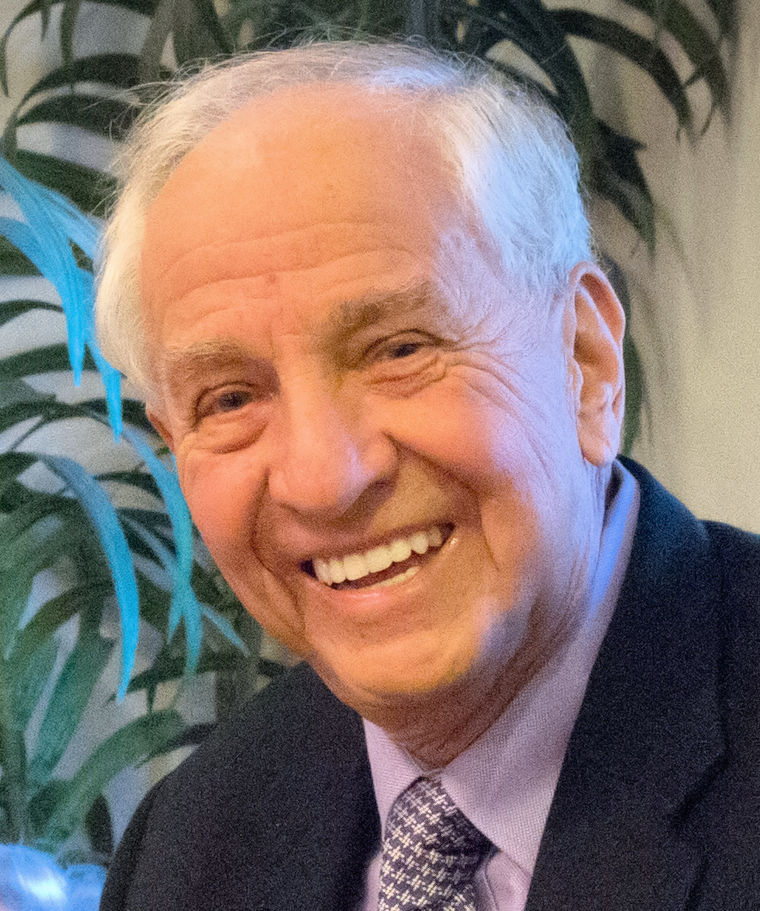
Garry Marshall

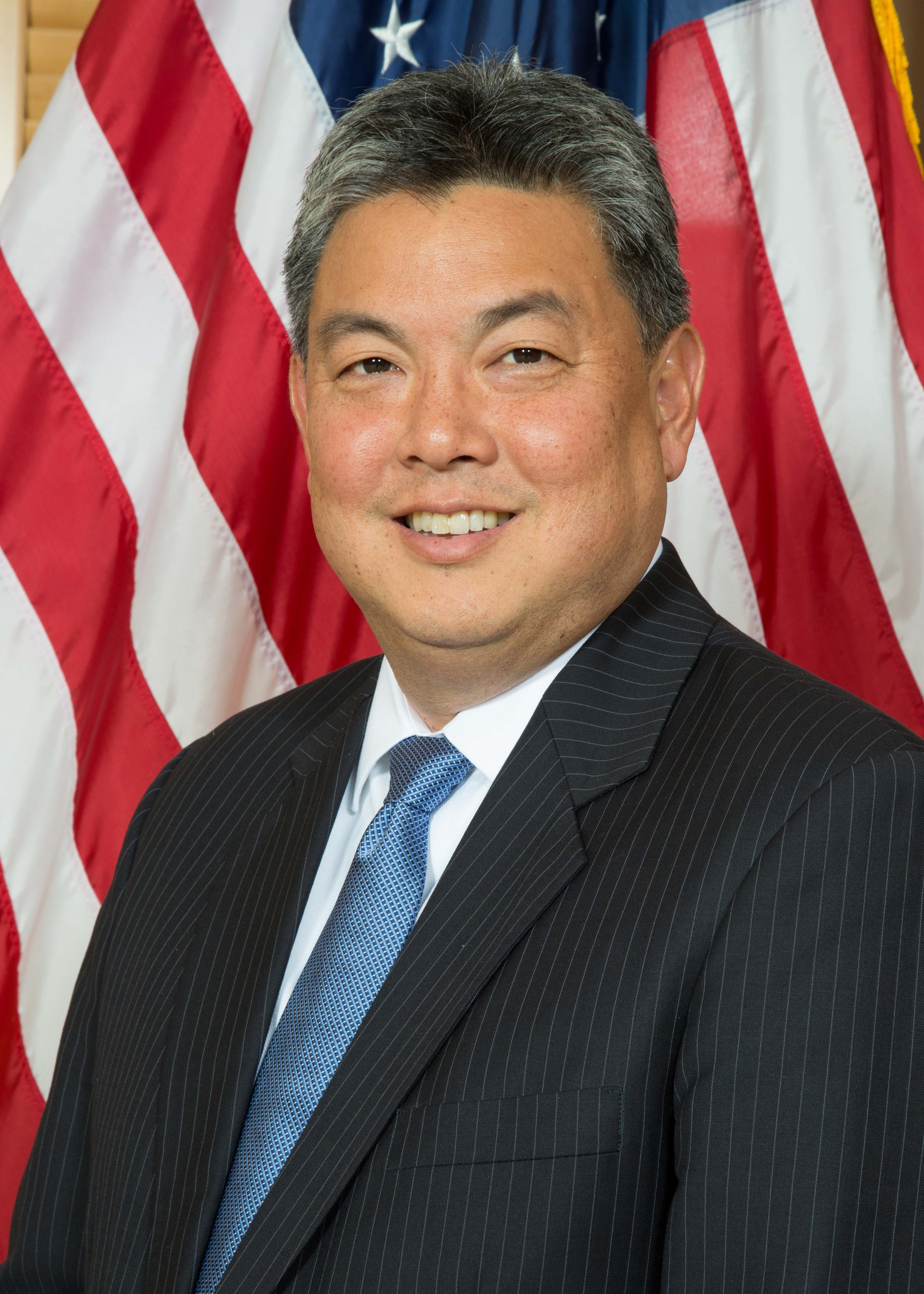
Mark Takai

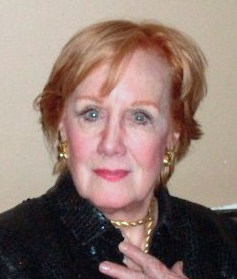
Marni Nixon

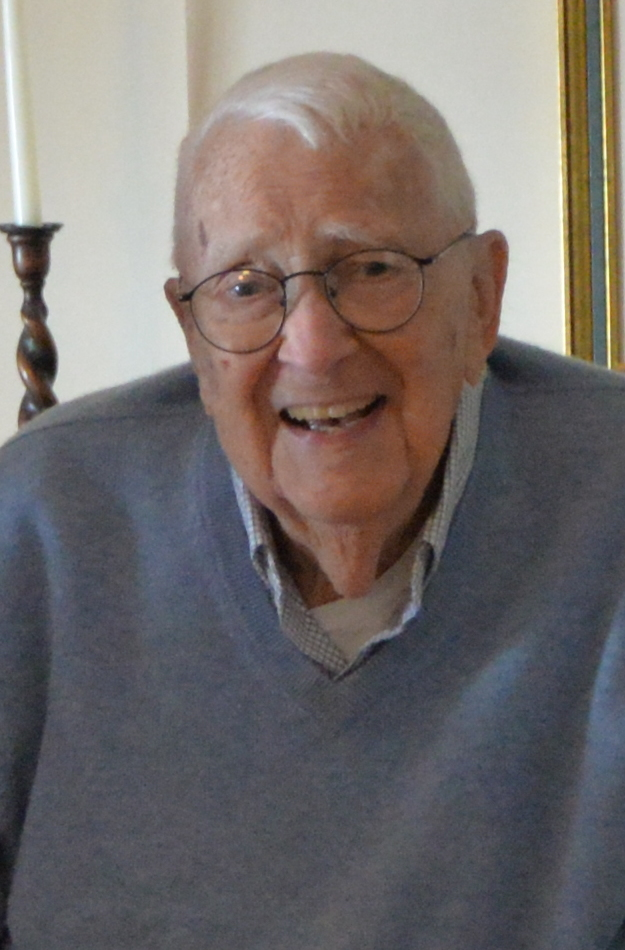
Jack Davis

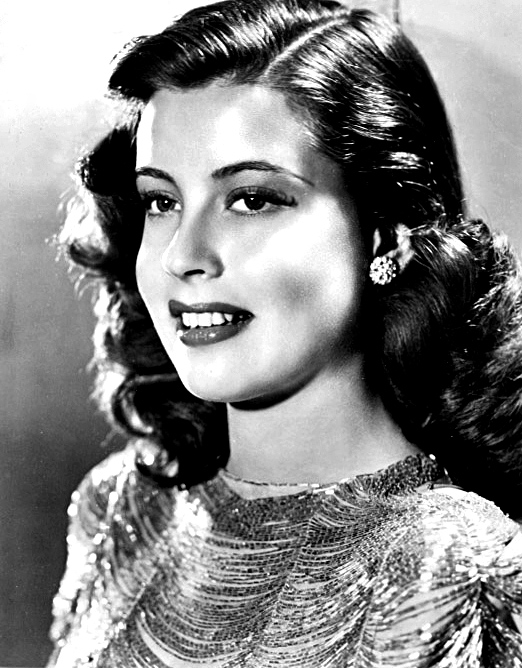
Gloria DeHaven

- July 2
  - Roscoe Brown, aviator and educator (born 1922)
  - Michael Cimino, film director, producer, and screenwriter (born 1939)
  - Alphie McCourt, Irish-born writer (born 1940)
  - Jack C. Taylor, businessman, billionaire, and philanthropist (born 1922)
  - Elie Wiesel, Romanian-born writer, educator, political activist, and Holocaust survivor (born 1928)
- July 3
  - Noel Neill, actress (born 1920)
  - Clifford Vaughs, civil rights activist, filmmaker, and motorcycle builder (born 1937)
- July 4 – Abner J. Mikva, politician, federal judge, lawyer and law professor (born 1926)
- July 5 – William L. Armstrong, politician and businessman; U.S. Senator from Colorado (1979–1991) (born 1937)
- July 6
  - Marian Bergeson, politician; member of the California State Assembly (1978–1984) and California State Senate (1984–1995) (born 1925)
  - Larry Bock, entrepreneur (born 1959)
  - John McMartin, actor (born 1929)
  - Mike Moore, football player (born 1956)
- July 7 – Tom Marr, talk radio host and sportscaster (born 1942)
- July 8
  - Harold A. Linstone, German-born mathematician and futurist (born 1924)
  - William H. McNeill, Canadian-born historian (born 1917)
  - Howard Raiffa, academic (born 1924)
- July 9
  - Norman Abbott, television director (born 1922)
  - Vaughn Harper, announcer and disc jockey (b. 1945)
  - Sydney Schanberg, journalist (born 1934)
- July 10
  - Robert E. Cooper Sr., judge (born 1920)
  - Debbie DiFranco, politician
  - Alfred G. Knudson, geneticist (born 1922)
  - Seth Rich, murder victim (born 1989)
- July 11
  - John Brademas, politician and educator, U.S. Representative from Indiana (1959–1981) (born 1927)
  - Jim Metzen, politician (born 1943)
  - Scott Olin Wright, judge (born 1923)
- July 13
  - Marion Campbell, football player and coach (born 1929)
  - Garry N. Drummond, businessman and philanthropist (born 1938)
  - Robert Fano, Italian-born computer scientist (born 1917)
  - Hollis L. Harris, businessman (born 1931)
  - Carolyn See, author and educator (born 1934)
- July 14
  - Roger Chanoine, football player (born 1976)
  - Troy Mader, rancher and politician; Wyoming state representative (2014–2015) (born 1955)
  - Sharon Runner, politician; California state senator (2011–2016) (born 1954)
- July 15
  - Karl E. Case, economist and academic (born 1946)
  - Duncan M. Gray Jr., Episcopalian prelate (born 1926)
- July 16
  - Bonnie Brown, country singer (born 1938)
  - Robert Burren Morgan, politician; U.S. Senator from North Carolina (1975–1981) (born 1925)
  - Gary S. Paxton, record producer, songwriter, and musician (born 1939)
  - Nate Thurmond, basketball player (born 1941)
  - Alan Vega, vocalist and visual artist (born 1938)
- July 17
  - Wendell Anderson, politician; 33rd Governor of Minnesota (1971–1976) (born 1933)
  - Mel Durslag, sportswriter (born 1921)
- July 18
  - John Kerr, author (born 1950)
  - Jeffrey Montgomery, LGBT rights activist (born 1953)
  - Billy Name, photographer, filmmaker, and lighting designer (born 1940)
- July 19
  - Betsy Bloomingdale, socialite and philanthropist (born 1922)
  - Garry Marshall, actor, director, writer, and producer (born 1934)
  - Chief Zee, Washington Redskins superfan (born 1941)
- July 20
  - William Gaines, journalist and academic
  - Mark Takai, politician; U.S. Representative from Hawaii (2015–2016) (born 1967)
- July 21
  - Bill Cardille, television and radio personality (born 1928)
  - Dennis Green, football player and coach (b. 1949)
  - Thomas R. McCarthy, racehorse owner and trainer (born 1934)
  - Lewie Steinberg, rhythm and blues bassist (born 1933)
- July 22
  - Dave Bald Eagle, Lakota actor, musician, soldier, and stuntman (born 1919)
  - Dennis Green, football coach (born 1949)
  - Zeke Smith, football player (born 1936)
- July 23
  - Sheilla Lampkin, politician (born 1945)
  - Harold Duane Vietor, federal judge (born 1931)
  - Mari Gilbert, activist and mother of homicide victim Shannan Gilbert (born 1964)
- July 24
  - Marni Nixon, singer and actress (born 1930)
  - Conrad Prebys, real estate developer and philanthropist (born 1933)
  - Don Roberts, ice hockey coach (born 1933)
- July 25
  - Dwight Jones, basketball player (born 1952)
  - Tim LaHaye, evangelical minister, author, and speaker (born 1926)
  - Tom Peterson, retailer and television personality (born 1930)
  - Franklin Van Antwerpen, federal judge (born 1941)
- July 26
  - Miss Cleo, psychic and television personality (born 1926)
  - David A. Katz, federal judge (born 1933)
  - Forrest Mars Jr., businessman and billionaire (born 1931)
  - Sandy Pearlman, record producer, talent manager, and songwriter (born 1943)
- July 27
  - LaVon Crosby, politician; Nebraska state senator (1988–2000) (born 1924)
  - Jack Davis, cartoonist and illustrator (born 1924)
  - Jerry Doyle, radio host, political commentator, and actor (born 1956)
  - Doug Griffin, baseball player (born 1947)
  - James Alan McPherson, short story writer and essayist (born 1943)
  - Richard Thompson, cartoonist (born 1957)
- July 28 – Conrad K. Cyr, federal judge (born 1931)
- July 29
  - Antonio Armstrong, football player (born 1973)
  - Zelda Fichandler, theatre producer, director, manager, and educator (born 1924)
- July 30
  - Alan Brice, baseball player (born 1937)
  - Gloria DeHaven, actress and singer (born 1925)
  - Dave Schwartz, meteorologist (born 1953)
- July 31 – Eric Moon, British-born librarian (born 1923)

=== August ===
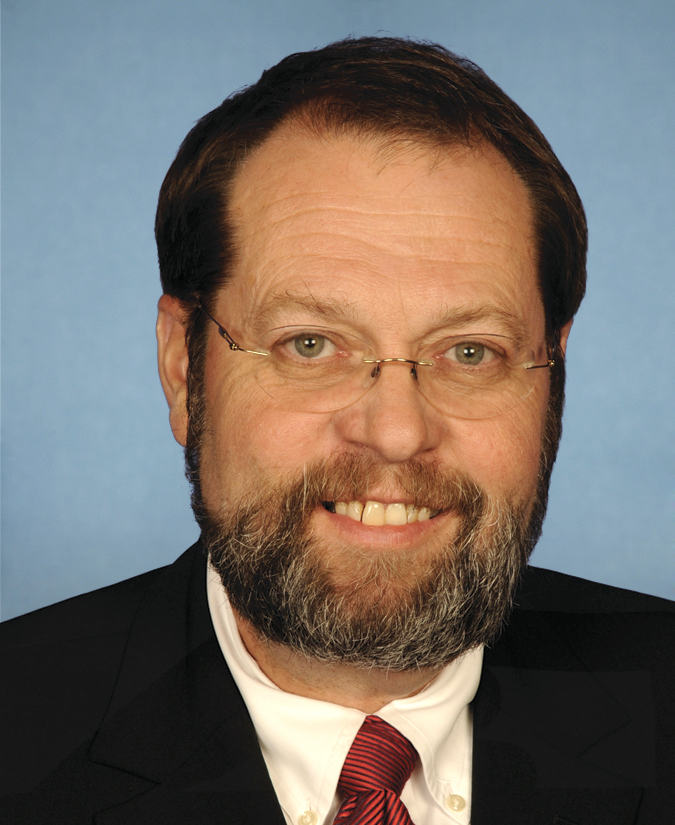
Steve LaTourette

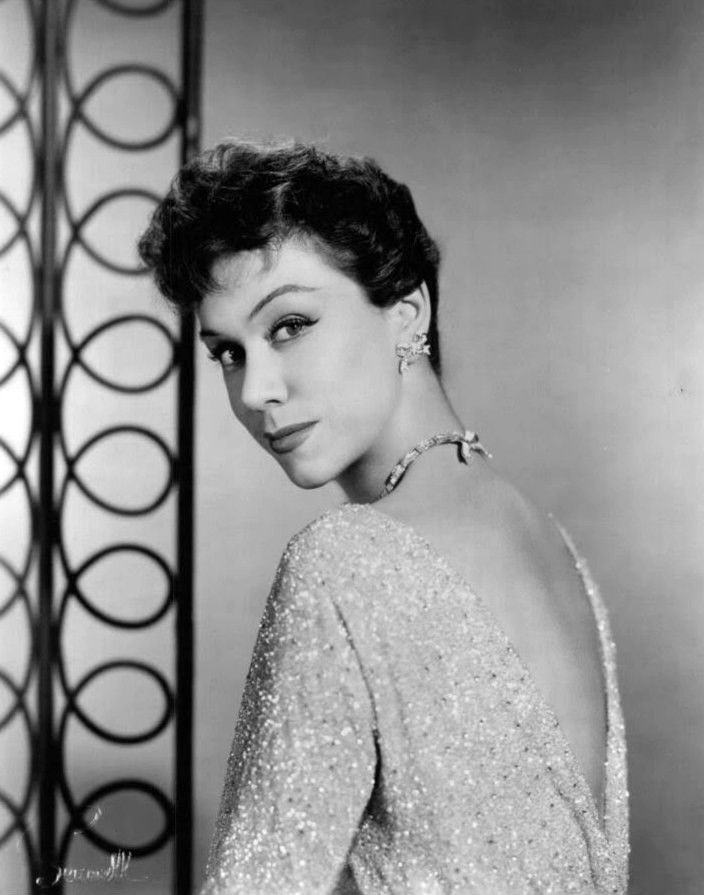
Patrice Munsel

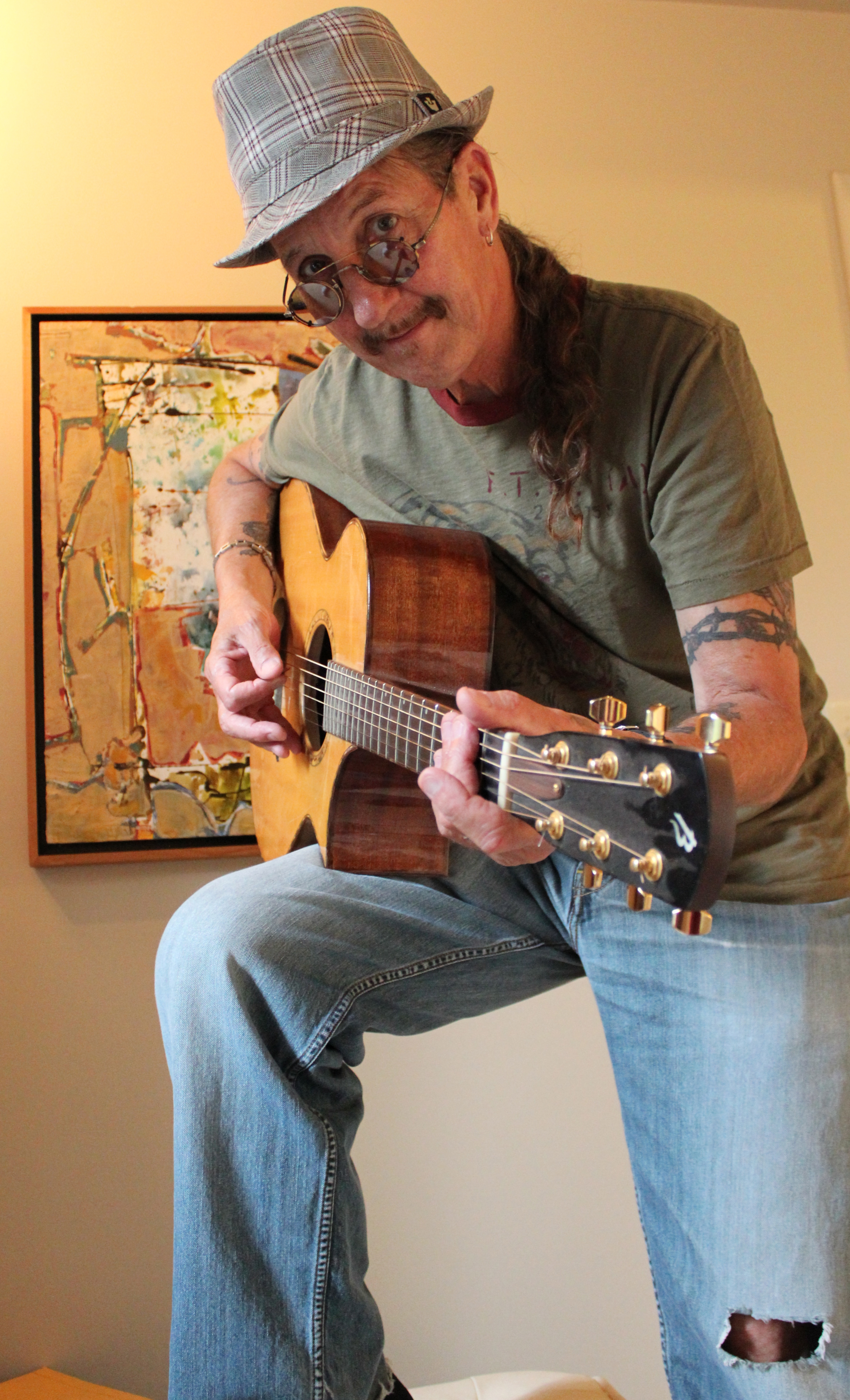
Richard Fagan

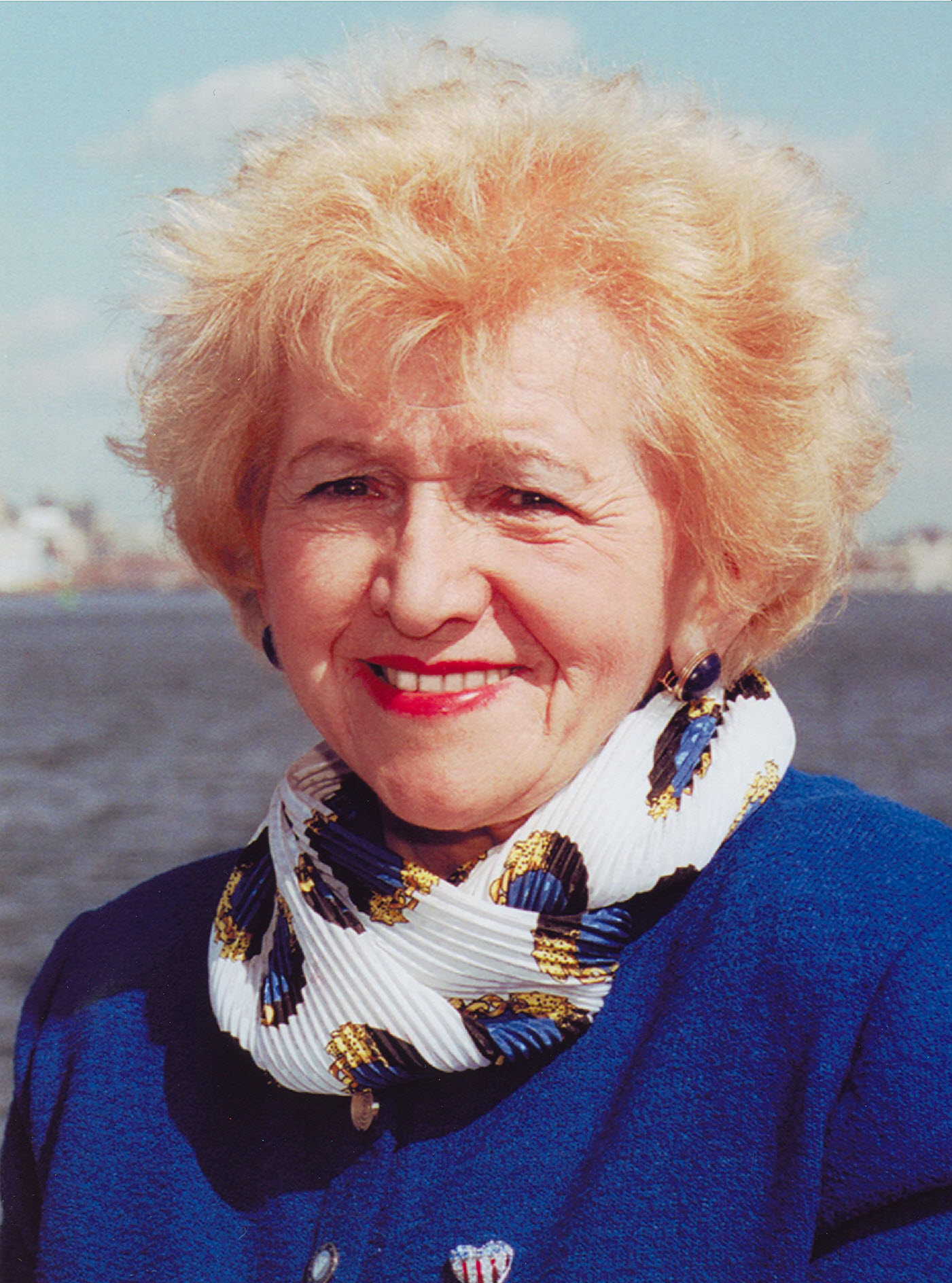
Helen Delich Bentley

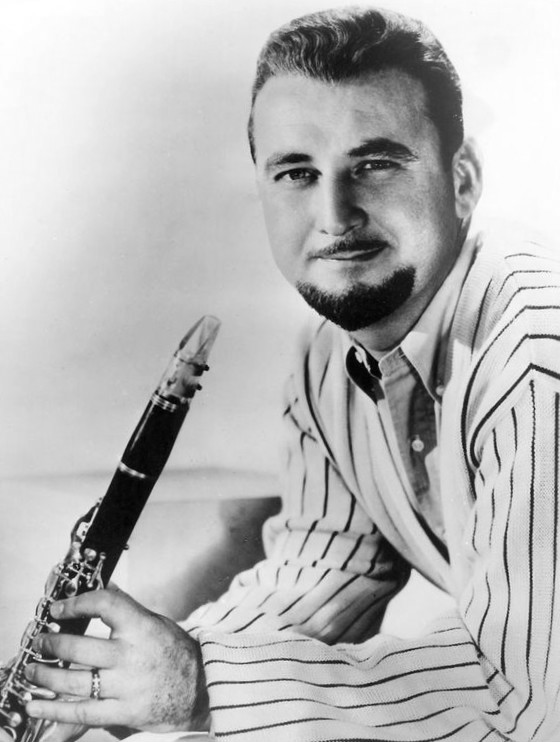
Pete Fountain

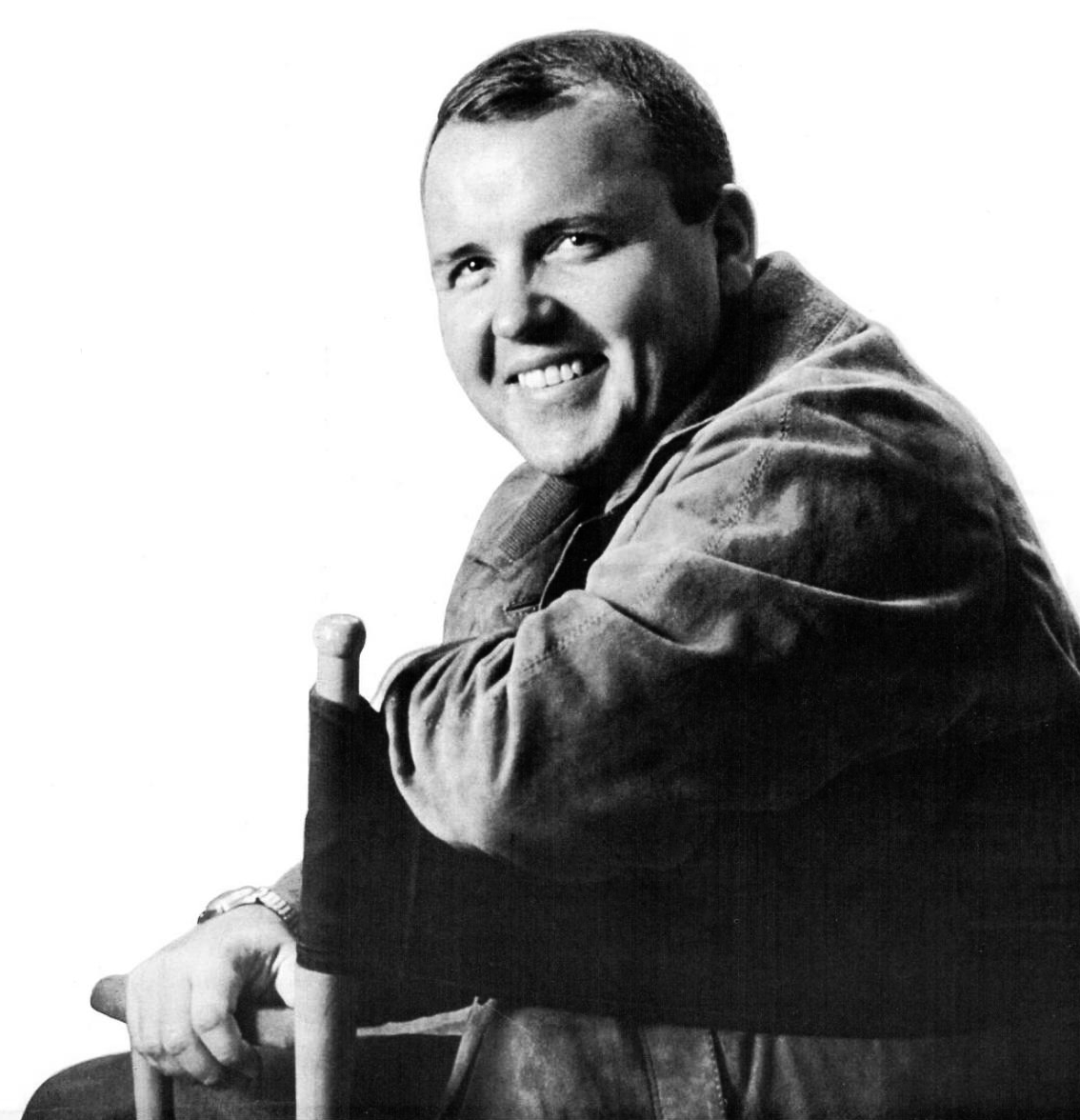
Glenn Yarbrough

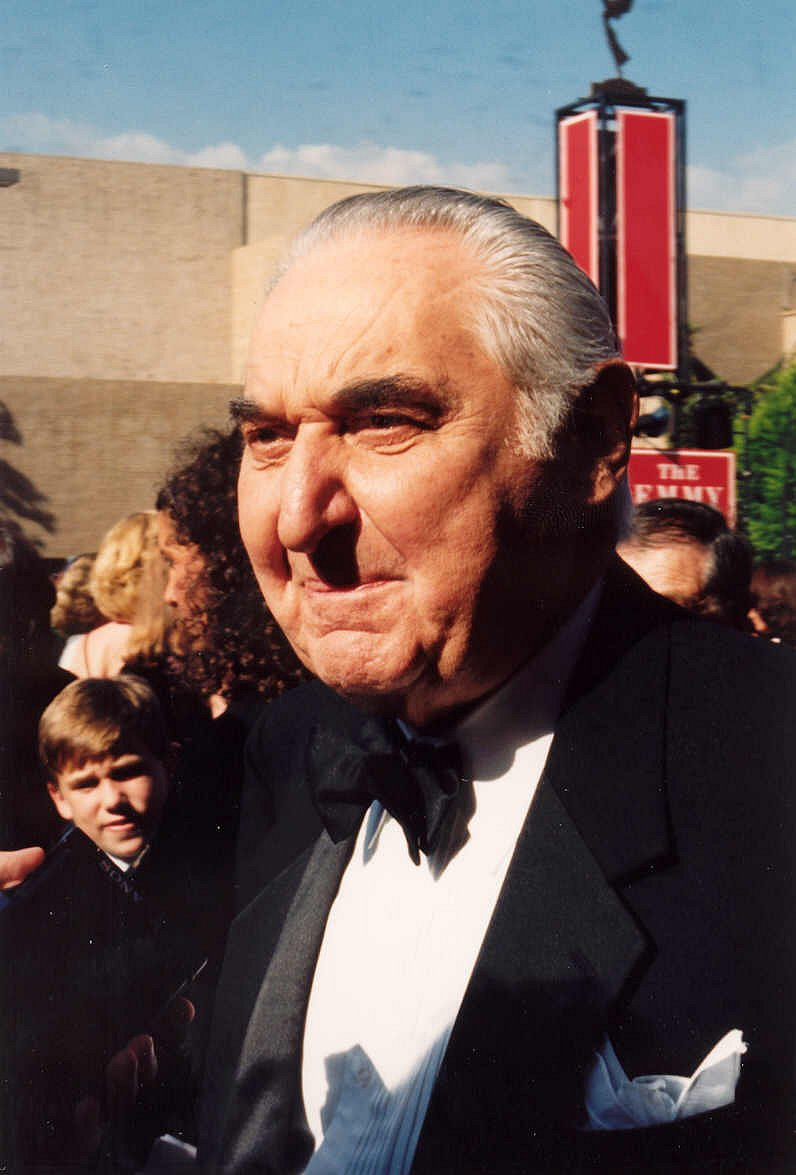
Fyvush Finkel

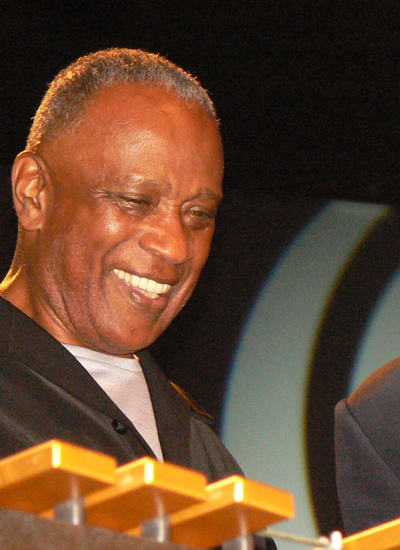
Bobby Hutcherson

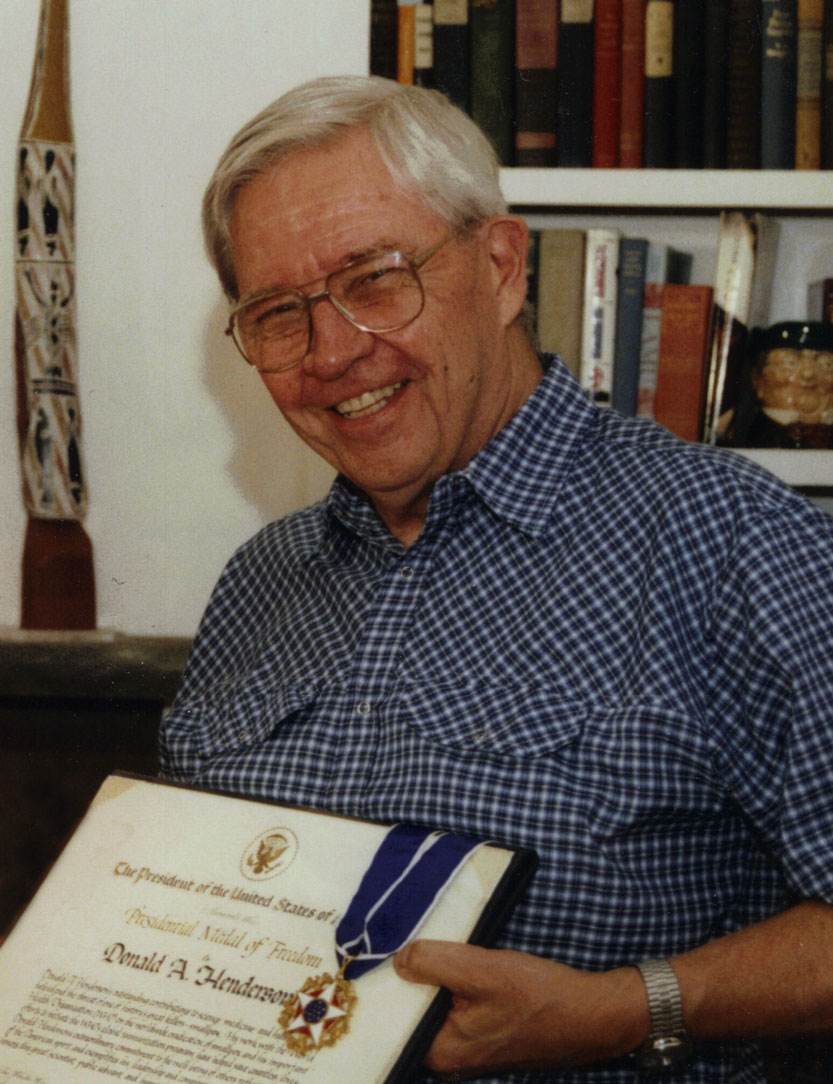
Donald Henderson

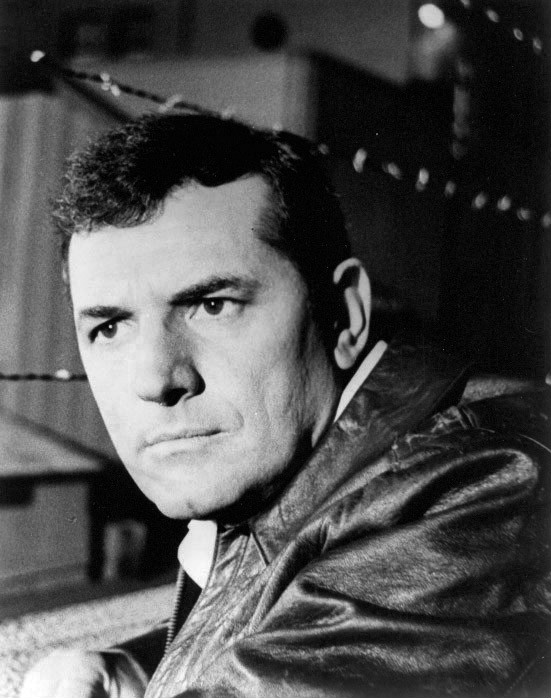
Steven Hill

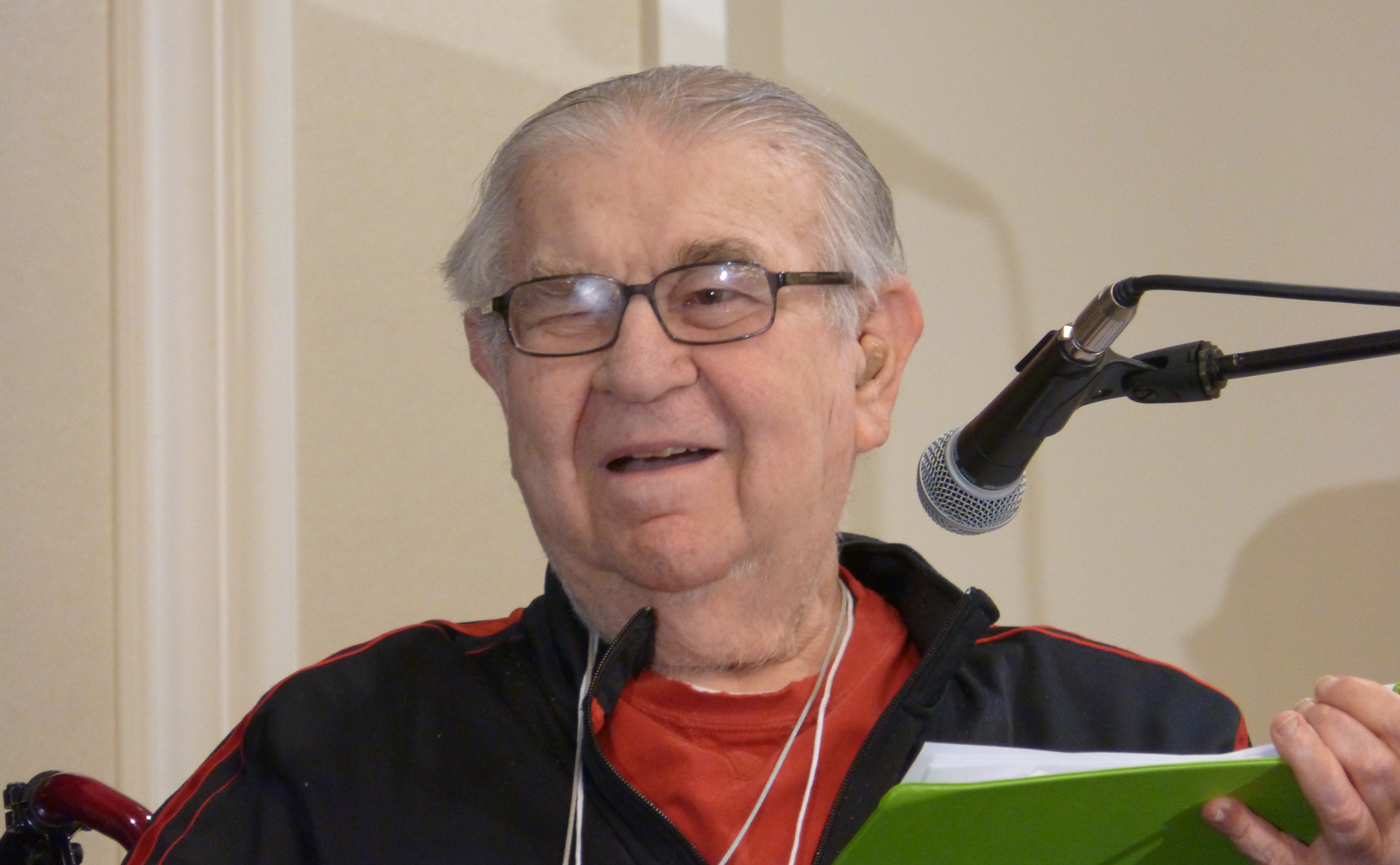
Marvin Kaplan

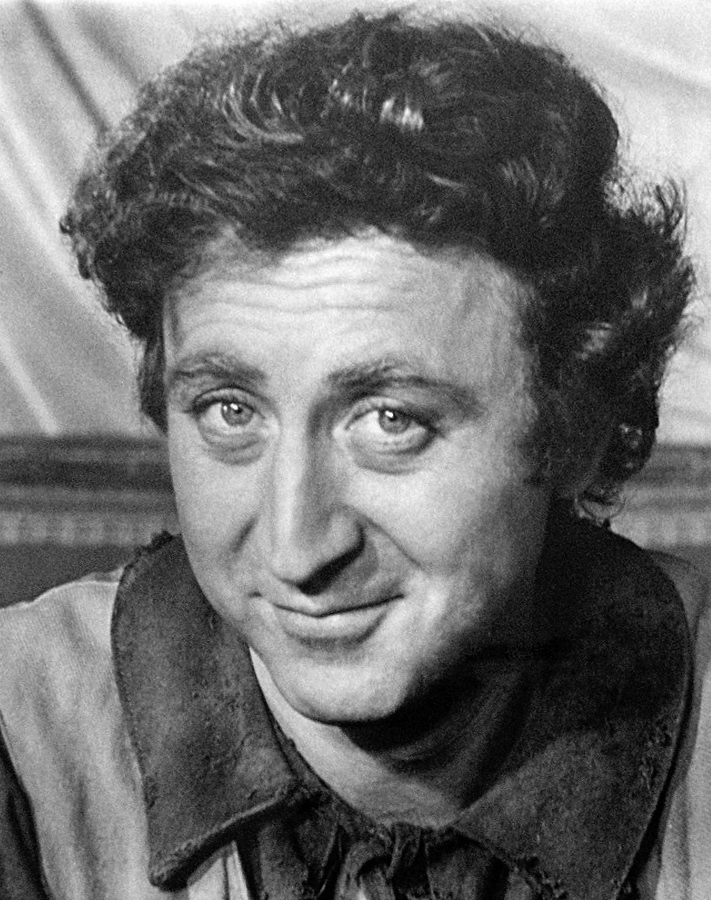
Gene Wilder

- August 1
  - Jonathan D. Krane, film producer (born 1952)
  - Jim Northrup, Ojibwe writer (born 1943)
- August 2
  - Gordon Danby, physicist (born 1929)
  - David Huddleston, actor (born 1930)
  - Ahmed Zewail, Egyptian-born chemist (born 1946)
- August 3
  - Abdul Jeelani, basketball player (born 1954)
  - Steve LaTourette, politician; U.S. Representative from Ohio (2005–2013) (born 1954)
  - Elliot Tiber, writer and artist (born 1935)
- August 4
  - Jean Antone, wrestler (born 1943)
  - David Dudley Dowd Jr., federal judge (born 1929)
  - Patrice Munsel, operatic soprano (born 1925)
  - Albert Nicholas, basketball player, businessman and philanthropist (born 1931)
  - Gaspar Saladino, comic letterer and logo designer (born 1927)
- August 5
  - Alan Bates, politician; Oregon state senator (2005–2016) (born 1945)
  - Richard Fagan, country songwriter and musician (born 1947)
  - George E. Mendenhall, Biblical scholar (born 1916)
- August 6
  - Sid Applebaum, businessman (born 1924)
  - Helen Delich Bentley, politician; U.S. Representative from Maryland (1985–1995) (born 1923)
  - Joani Blank, feminist writer, sex educator, and entrepreneur (born 1937)
  - Art Demmas, football official (born 1934)
  - Pete Fountain, jazz clarinetist (born 1930)
- August 7
  - Bryan Clauson, racing driver (born 1989)
  - Sagan Lewis, actress (born 1952)
- August 8 – George Yarno, football player (born 1957)
- August 9
  - Bill Dooley, football player and coach (born 1934)
  - Barry Jenner, actor (born 1941)
  - W. Carter Merbreier, television personality, minister, and police chaplain (born 1926)
- August 10
  - Neill Armstrong, football player and coach (born 1926)
  - Steve Pivovar, sportswriter (born 1952)
  - John Saunders, Canadian-born sports journalist and broadcaster (born 1955)
  - Tom Wilson, football player and coach (born 1944)
- August 11
  - Thomas Steinbeck, author, journalist, and photographer (born 1944)
  - Glenn Yarbrough, folk singer (born 1930)
- August 12
  - Alison Piepmeier, feminist writer, academic, and activist (born 1972)
  - Ruby Wilson, blues and gospel singer (born 1948)
- August 13
  - Allen Kelley, basketball player (born 1932)
  - Michel Richard, French-born chef and restaurateur (born 1948)
- August 14
  - Marion Christopher Barry, businessman (born 1980)
  - DJ Official, hip hop musician and producer (born 1976)
  - Fyvush Finkel, actor (born 1922)
  - Ron Vander Kelen, football player (born 1939)
- August 15
  - Choo-Choo Coleman, baseball player (born 1937)
  - Bobby Hutcherson, jazz vibraphonist and composer (born 1941)
  - Richard Wackar, football and basketball coach (born 1928)
- August 16
  - John McLaughlin, political commentator and television personality (born 1927)
  - Richard Seminack, Eastern Catholic bishop (born 1942)
- August 17
  - Steve Arlin, baseball player (born 1945)
  - James R. Bennett, politician; 49th and 52nd Secretary of State of Alabama (born 1940)
  - Arthur Hiller, Canadian-born film and television director (born 1923)
  - John Timoney, Irish-born police officer (born 1948)
- August 18
  - Jay S. Fishman, businessman (born 1952)
  - John William Vessey Jr., U.S. Army general; tenth Chairman of the Joint Chiefs of Staff (born 1922)
- August 19
  - Donald Henderson, physician, educator, and epidemiologist (born 1928)
  - Edward T. Maloney, aviation historian (born 1928)
  - Lou Pearlman, record producer, music manager, and fraudster (born 1954)
  - Jack Riley, actor, voice artist, and comedian (born 1935)
- August 20
  - George E. Curry, journalist (born 1947)
  - Irving Fields, pianist and composer (born 1915)
  - Jim Gibbons, football player (born 1936)
  - Harry Gilmer, football player (born 1926)
  - Joseph A. Palaia, politician; New Jersey state senator (1989–2008) (born 1927)
  - Morton Schindel, film producer and educator (born 1918)
  - Morris A. Wessel, pediatrician (born 1917)
- August 21 – Peter deCourcy Hero, college and foundation president (born 1942)
- August 22
  - Michael Brooks, basketball player (born 1958)
  - Edward Malefakis, history professor (born 1932)
  - Jane Thompson, designer, architect, and urban planner (born 1927)
- August 23
  - Steven Hill, actor (born 1922)
  - Aaron W. Plyler, businessman and politician (born 1926)
- August 24
  - Joel Bergman, architect (born 1936)
  - Gregory P. Schmidt, politician (born 1947)
- August 25
  - James Cronin, physicist (born 1931)
  - Warren Hinckle, political journalist (born 1938)
  - Marvin Kaplan, actor and voice artist (born 1927)
  - Rudy Van Gelder, recording engineer (born 1924)
- August 26
  - Steve Korcheck, baseball player (born 1932)
  - E. Parry Thomas, banker, racehorse owner, and philanthropist (born 1921)
- August 27 – Bill Lenkaitis, football player (born 1946)
- August 28
  - Mr. Fuji, professional wrestler and manager (born 1937)
  - Joe R. Hicks, political commentator and activist (born 1941)
  - Nate Hirsch, sportscaster (born 1947)
- August 29
  - Dee Dowis, football player (born 1968)
  - Gene Wilder, actor, screenwriter, film director, and author (born 1933)
- August 30
  - Dan Dryden, politician (born 1944)
  - Hoot Hester, fiddle player (born 1951)
  - David Lavery, academic (born 1949)
  - Doris McLemore, educator; last fluent speaker of the Wichita language (born 1927)
  - Joe Sutter, aeronautical engineer (born 1921)
- August 31 – Nathan Lyons, photographer (born 1930)

=== September ===
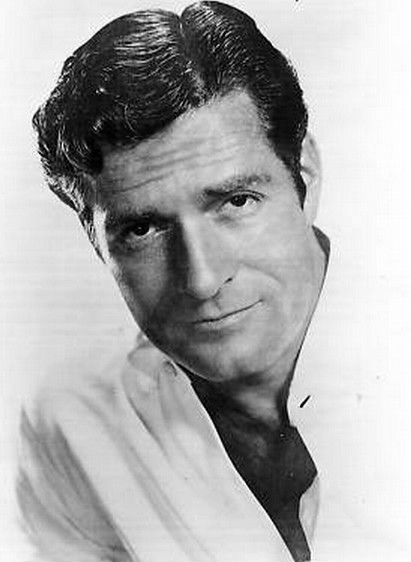
Hugh O'Brian

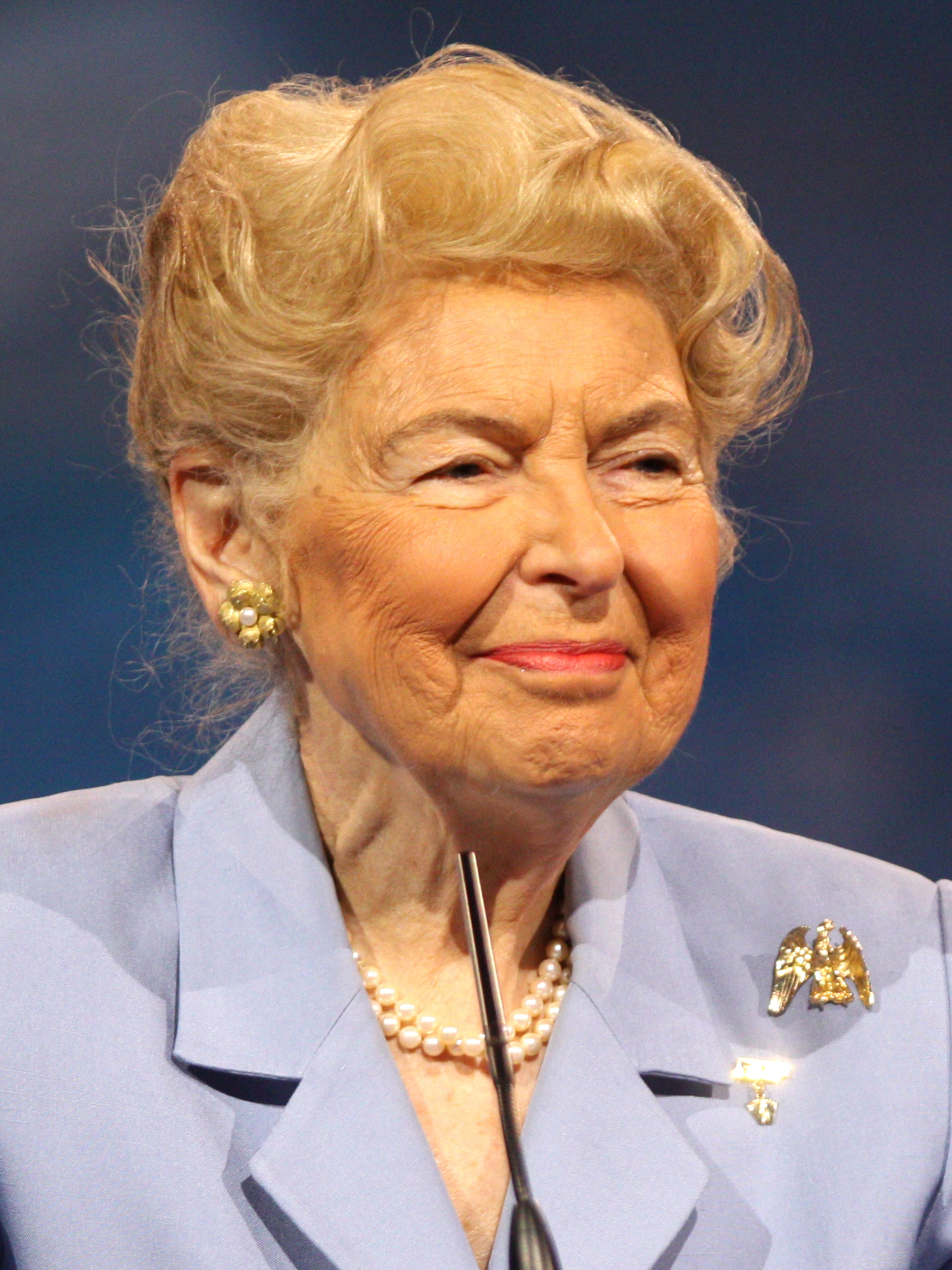
Phyllis Schlafly

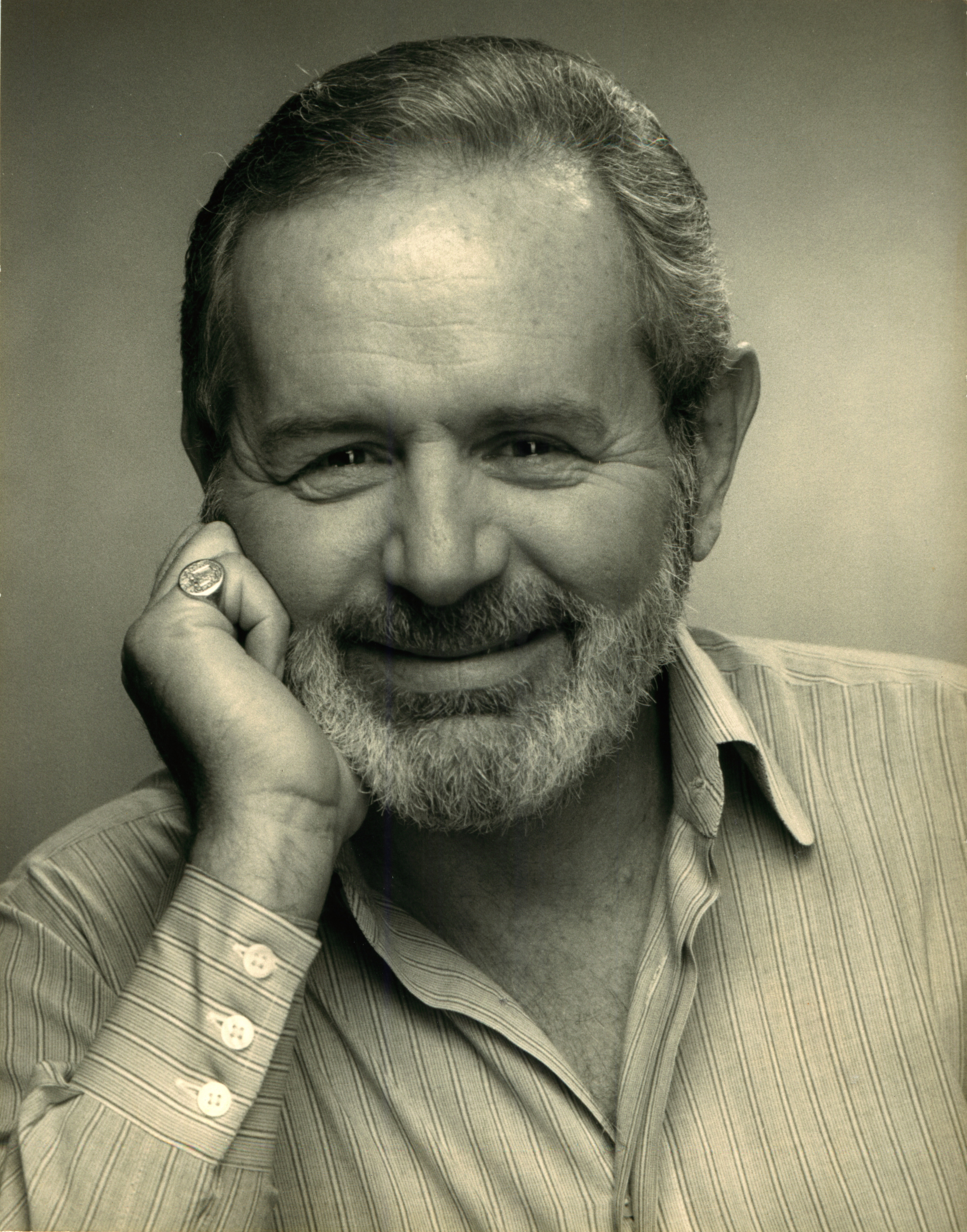
Chris Stone

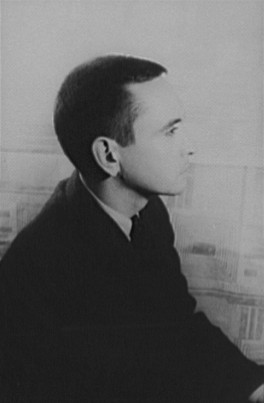
Edward Albee

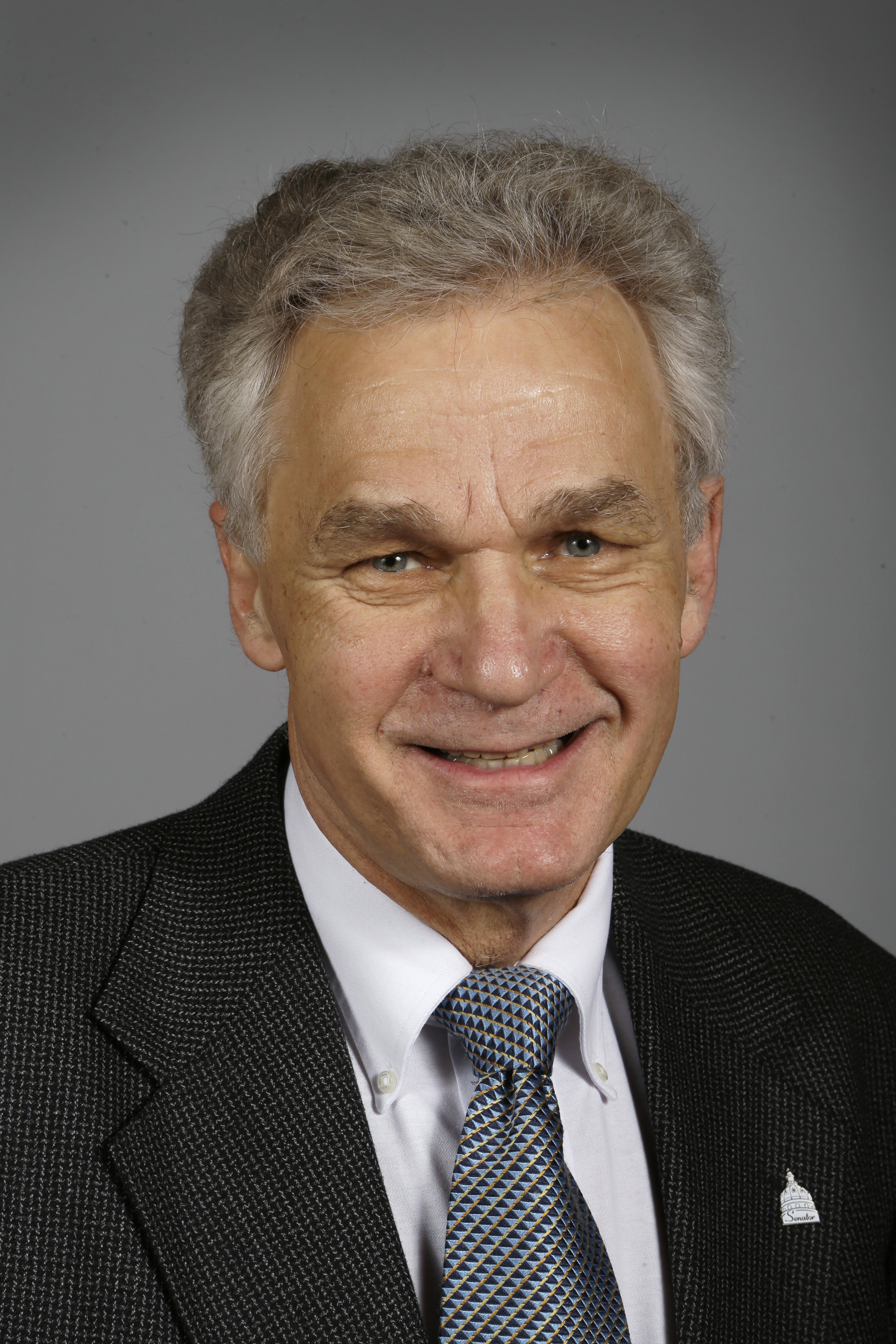
Joe Seng

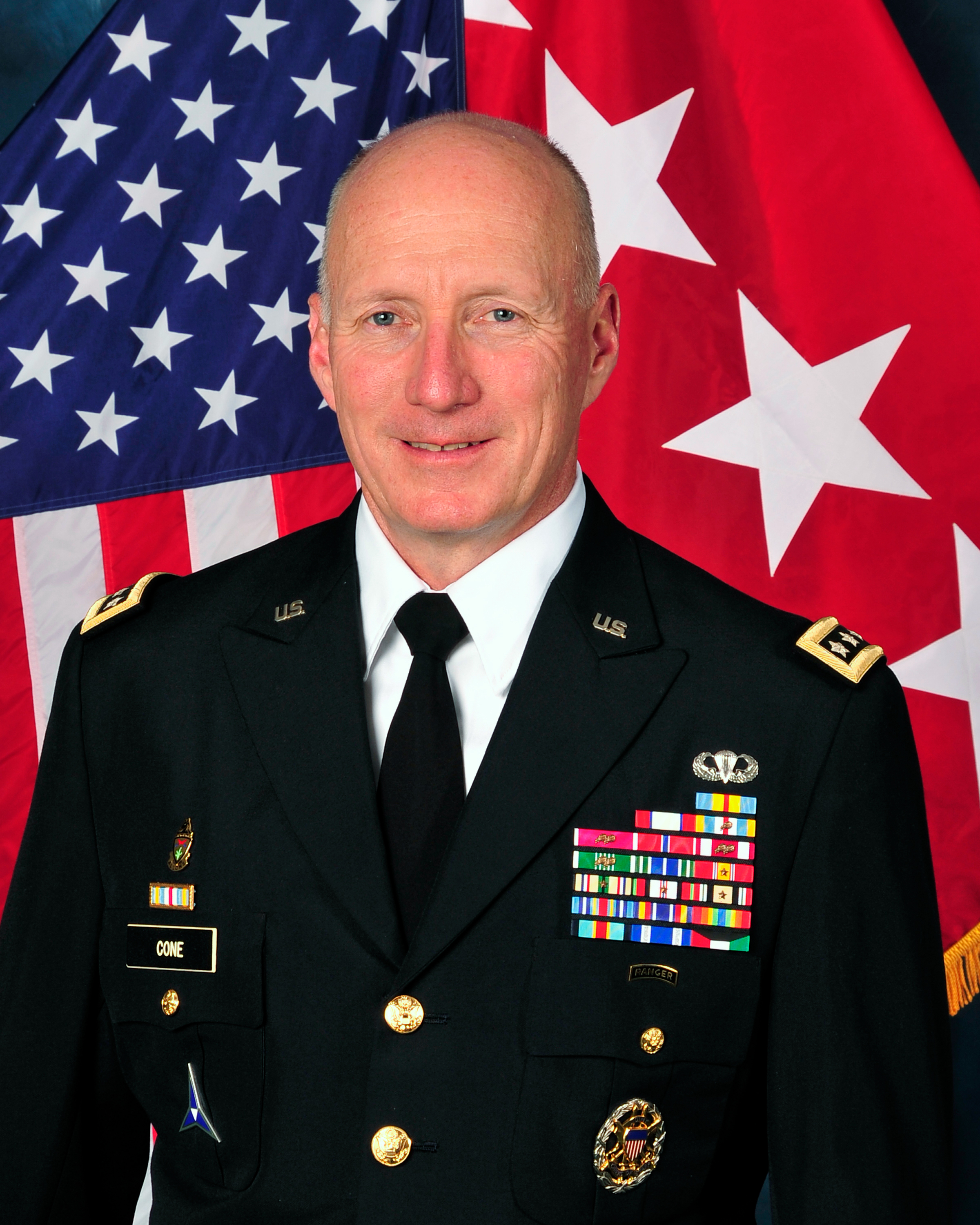
Robert W. Cone

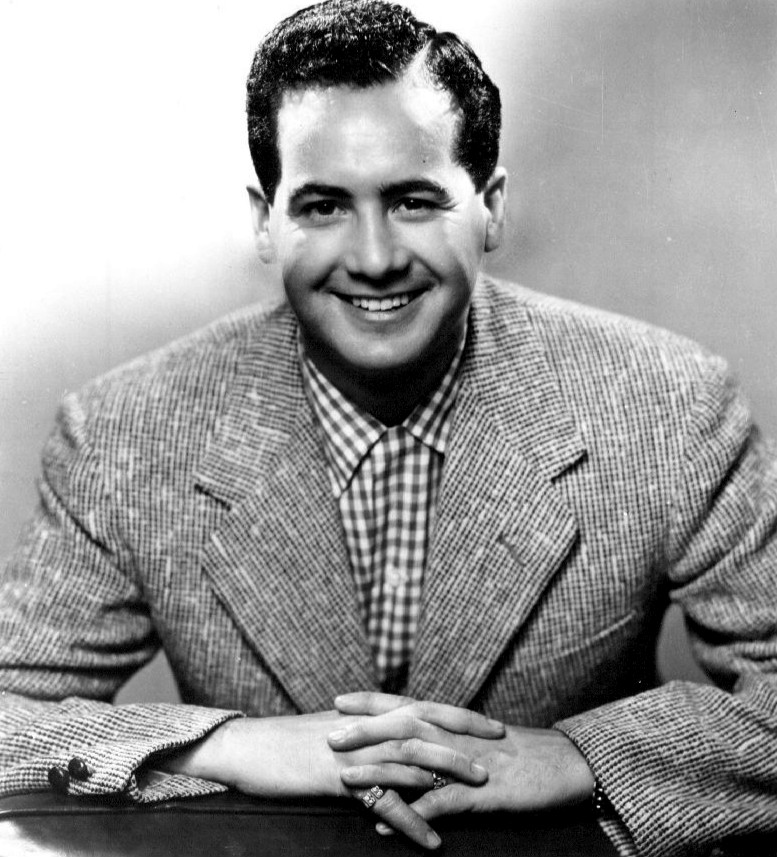
Bobby Breen

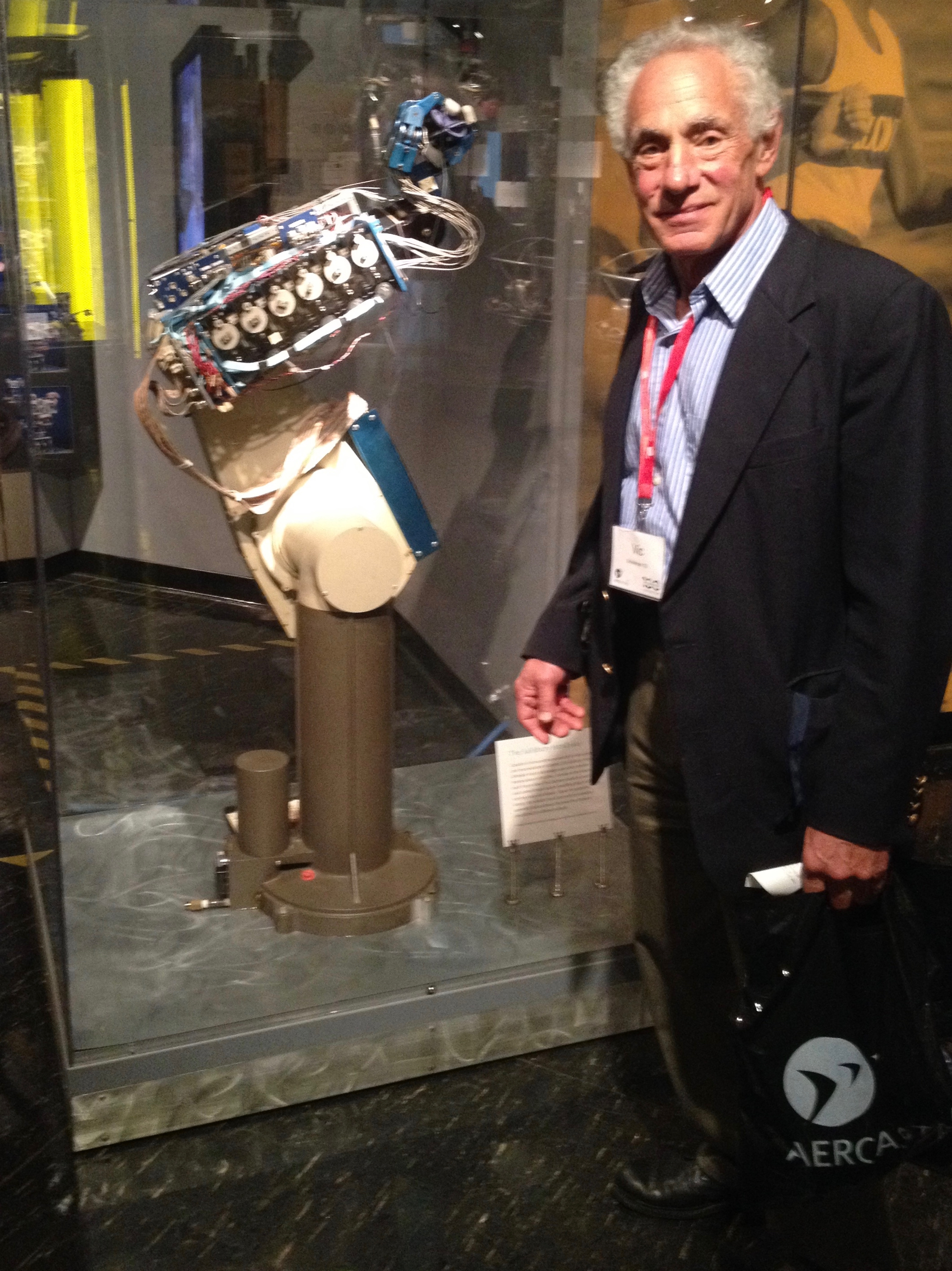
Victor Scheinman

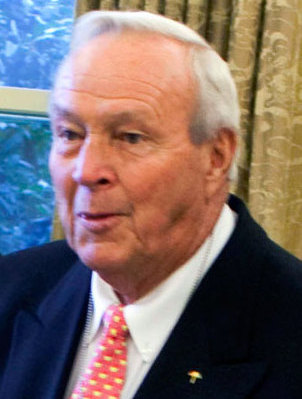
Arnold Palmer

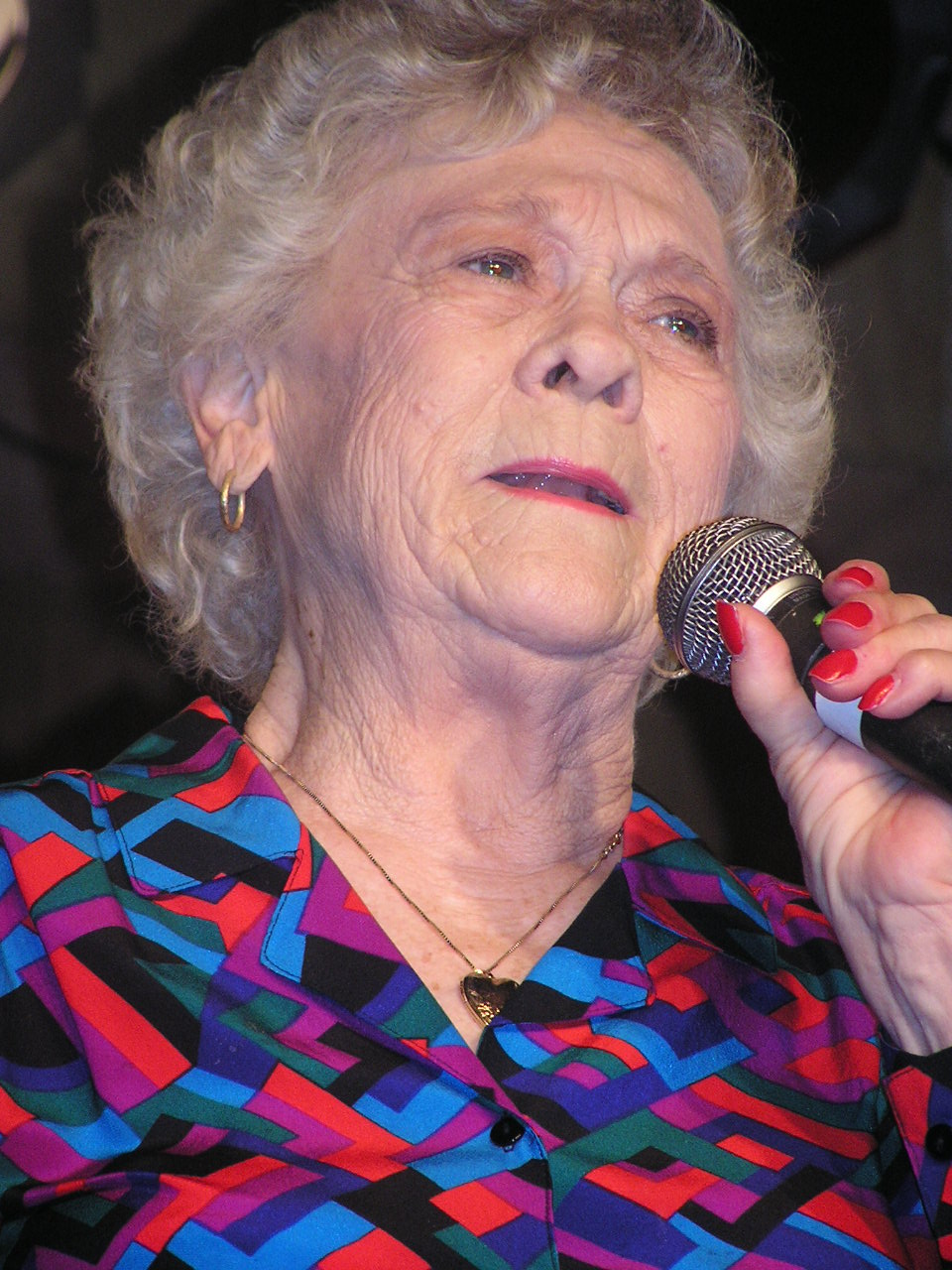
Jean Shepard

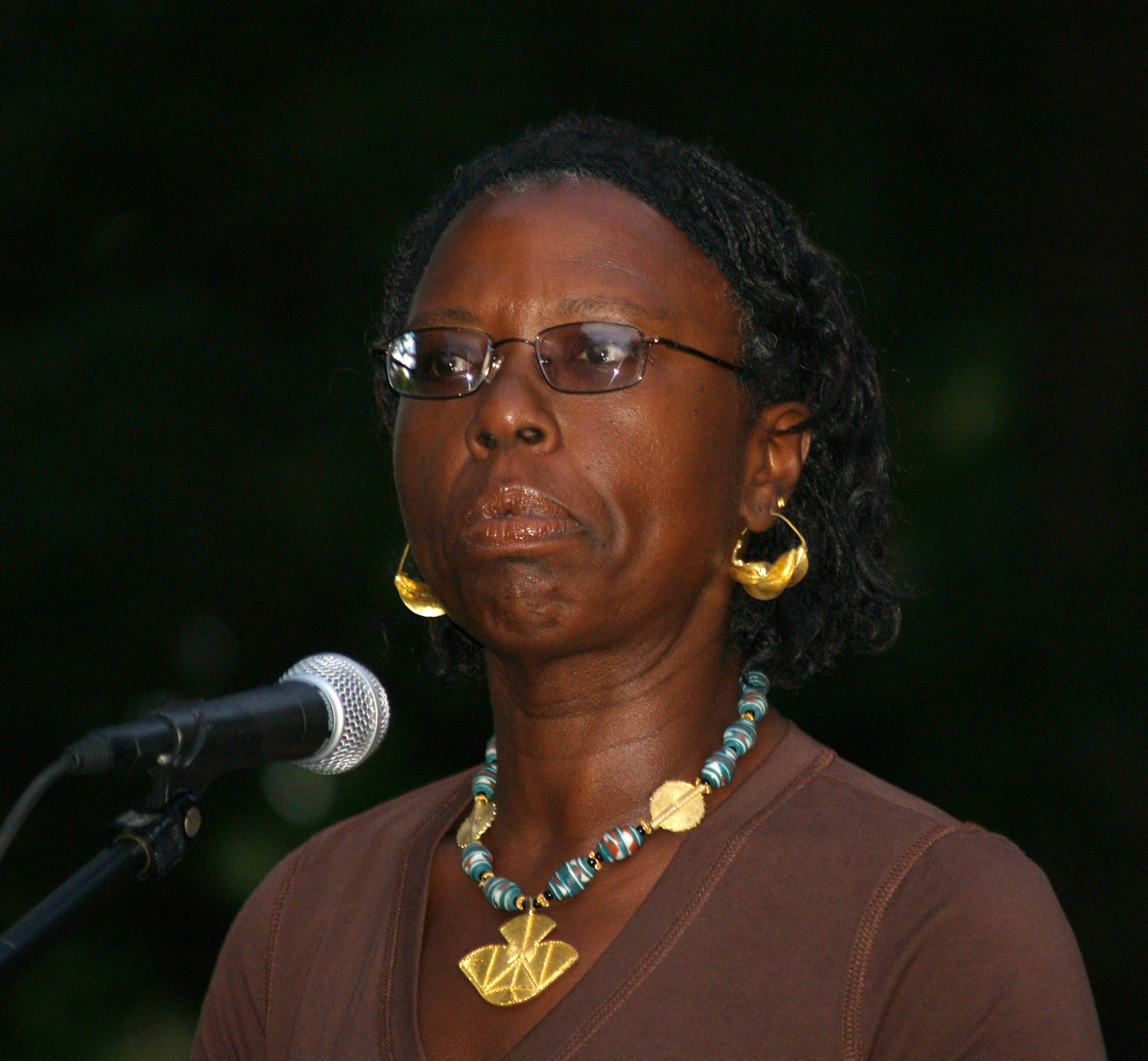
Gloria Naylor

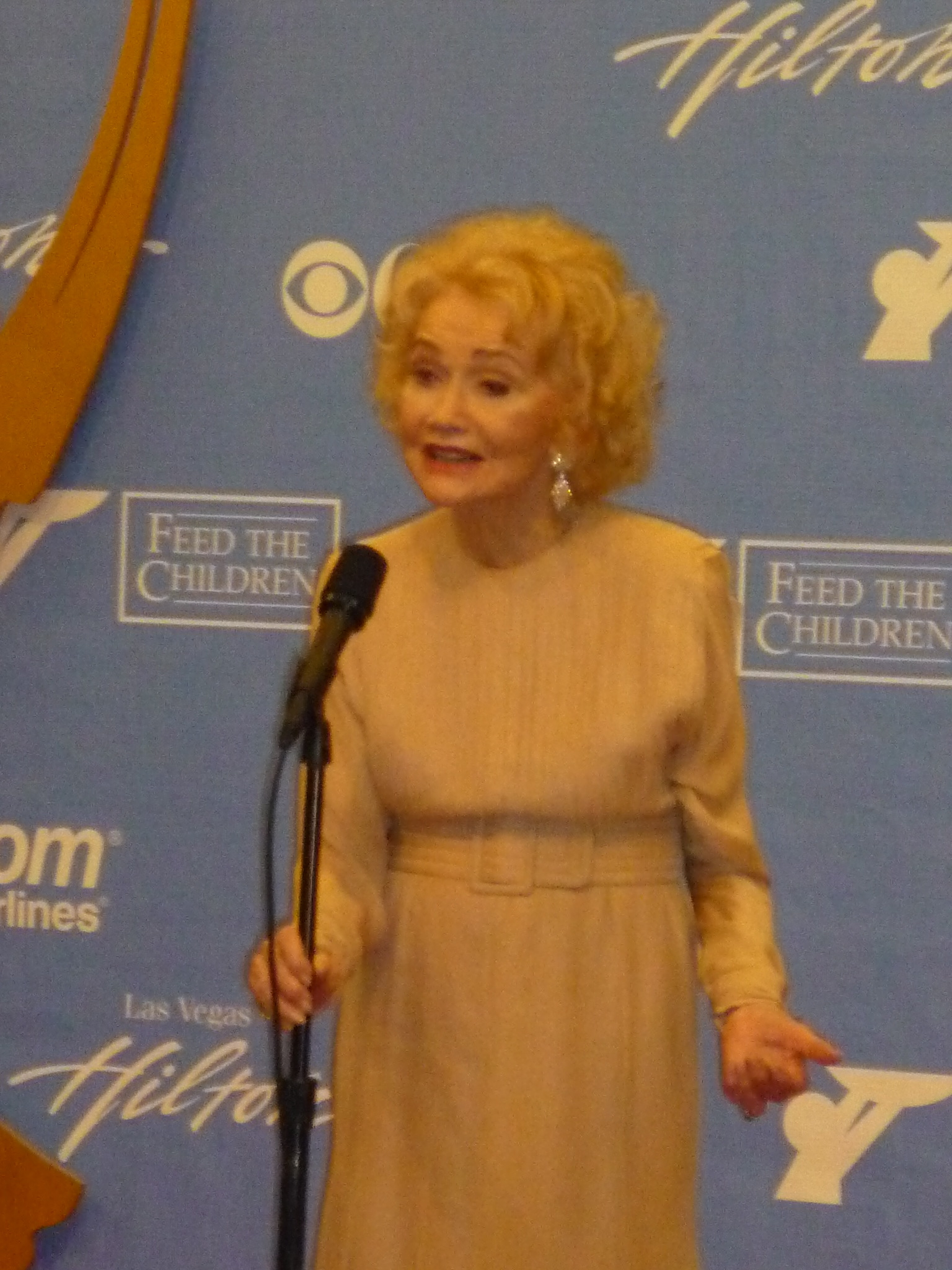
Agnes Nixon

- September 1
  - Thomas G. Doran, Roman Catholic prelate (born 1936)
  - Fred Hellerman, folk musician (born 1927)
  - Kacey Jones, singer-songwriter and humorist (born 1950)
  - Jon Polito, actor and voice artist (born 1950)
- September 2
  - Blackie Gejeian, race car driver and auto customizer (born 1926)
  - Jerry Heller, music manager (born 1940)
  - Don Minnick, baseball player (born 1931)
  - Margrit Mondavi, Swiss-born businesswoman (born 1925)
- September 3
  - John W. Drummond, politician (born 1919)
  - Albert Hofstede, politician (born 1940)
  - Leslie H. Martinson, film and television director (born 1915)
- September 4 – Clarence D. Rappleyea Jr., lawyer and politician (born 1933)
- September 5
  - Duane Graveline, physician and astronaut (born 1931)
  - Hugh O'Brian, actor (born 1925)
  - Rudolph T. Randa, federal judge (born 1940)
  - Phyllis Schlafly, constitutional lawyer, conservative activist, and author (born 1924)
- September 6
  - Cary Blanchard, football player (born 1968)
  - John Royston Coleman, labor economist and university president (born 1921)
  - Darren Seals, civil rights activist (born 1987)
  - Robert Timberg, journalist and author (born 1940)
- September 7
  - Bobby Chacon, boxer (born 1951)
  - Clifford Curry, R&B singer (born 1936)
  - Norbert Schemansky, weightlifter (born 1924)
- September 8
  - Greta Zimmer Friedman, dental assistant, subject of V-J Day in Times Square (born 1924)
  - The Lady Chablis, drag queen (born 1957)
- September 9
  - Chad Brown, football official (born 1948)
  - Bill Nojay, politician (born 1956)
  - Ben Press, tennis player, coach, and writer (born 1924)
  - James Stacy, actor (born 1936)
- September 10
  - Robert Eugene Allen, businessman (born 1935)
  - Chris Stone, businessman (born 1935)
  - Frank Masley, Olympic luger (born 1960)
- September 11
  - Alexis Arquette, actress (born 1969)
  - Lawrence D. Cohen, attorney, politician, and judge (born 1933)
- September 12
  - Edmund D. Edelman, politician (born 1930)
  - Peter Pettalia, politician (born 1955)
  - Stanley Sheinbaum, academic and activist (born 1920)
- September 13
  - Jack Hofsiss, theatre, film, and television director (born 1950)
  - Judith Jacobs, politician (born 1939)
  - Mike Roberts, sportscaster (born 1933)
  - Joe Zaleski, football player and coach (born 1927)
- September 14
  - Don Buchla, musical instrument designer (born 1937)
  - Kim McGuire, actress and lawyer (born 1955)
  - Dean White, businessman (born 1923)
- September 15 – Rose Mofford, politician (born 1922)
- September 16
  - Edward Albee, playwright (born 1928)
  - Don Bass, wrestler (born 1946)
  - Marvin Mottet, Roman Catholic priest (born 1930)
  - Joe Seng, politician (born 1946)
- September 17 – Charmian Carr, actress and singer (born 1942)
- September 18
  - Robert W. Cone, U.S. Army general (born 1957)
  - John Craighead, conservationist and naturalist (born 1916)
  - C. Martin Croker, animator and voice actor (born 1962)
  - David Kyle, science fiction writer (born 1919)
  - Tom Mintier, television correspondent
  - Joan Patricia Murphy, politician
  - Rose Pak, political activist (born 1948)
- September 19
  - Bobby Breen, Canadian-born actor and singer (born 1927)
  - Mike Fellows, politician
  - Bill Glassford, football player and coach (born 1914)
  - Zerka T. Moreno, Dutch-born psychotherapist (born 1917)
- September 20
  - Bill Barrett, politician; member of the U.S. House of Representatives (1991–2001) (born 1929)
  - Richie Dunn, ice hockey player (born 1957)
  - Jack Garman, computer engineer and NASA executive (born 1944)
  - Curtis Hanson, film producer, director, and screenwriter (born 1945)
  - Dennis M. Jones, businessman (born 1938)
  - Terry Kohler, businessman and philanthropist (born 1934)
  - Victor Scheinman, roboticist and inventor (born 1942)
- September 21
  - Shawty Lo, rapper (born 1976)
  - John D. Loudermilk, singer and songwriter (born 1934)
- September 22
  - Walter Bush, ice hockey executive (born 1929)
  - Leonard I. Garth, federal judge (born 1921)
  - Ed Temple, track and field coach (born 1927)
- September 24
  - Bill Nunn, actor (born 1953)
  - Buckwheat Zydeco, zydeco musician (born 1947)
- September 25
  - David Budbill, poet and playwright (born 1940)
  - José Fernández, Cuban-born baseball player (born 1992)
  - Kashif, musician, record producer, and humanitarian (born 1959)
  - Arnold Palmer, golfer (born 1929)
  - Jean Shepard, country singer and songwriter (born 1933)
  - Robert Weinberg, author (born 1946)
- September 26
  - Taz Anderson, football player (born 1938)
  - Joe Clay, rockabilly musician (born 1938)
  - Jack Cotton, basketball player (born 1924)
  - Jack Kirrane, ice hockey player (born 1928)
  - Herschell Gordon Lewis, film producer, director, and screenwriter (born 1929)
- September 27
  - Randy Duncan, football player (born 1937)
  - Charles Schultze, economist (born 1924)
- September 28
  - Gary Glasberg, television writer and producer (born 1966)
  - Malcolm M. Lucas, 26th Chief Justice of California (born 1927)
  - Gloria Naylor, novelist (born 1950)
  - Agnes Nixon, television writer and producer (born 1922)
  - Timothy Pesci, politician (born 1944)
- September 29
  - Hidden Lake, racehorse (born 1993)
  - Shirley Jaffe, painter and sculptor (born 1923)
  - Joseph Verner Reed Jr., banker and diplomat (born 1937)
  - Mark Ricks, politician; 40th Lieutenant Governor of Idaho (born 1924)
  - Ralph V. Whitworth, businessman (born 1955)
- September 30
  - George Barris, photographer (born 1922)
  - Charles Brading, pharmacist and politician (born 1935)
  - Oscar Brand, Canadian-born folk musician (born 1920)
  - Frederic C. Hamilton, oilman and philanthropist (born 1927)
  - Jim Zapp, baseball player (born 1924)

=== October ===
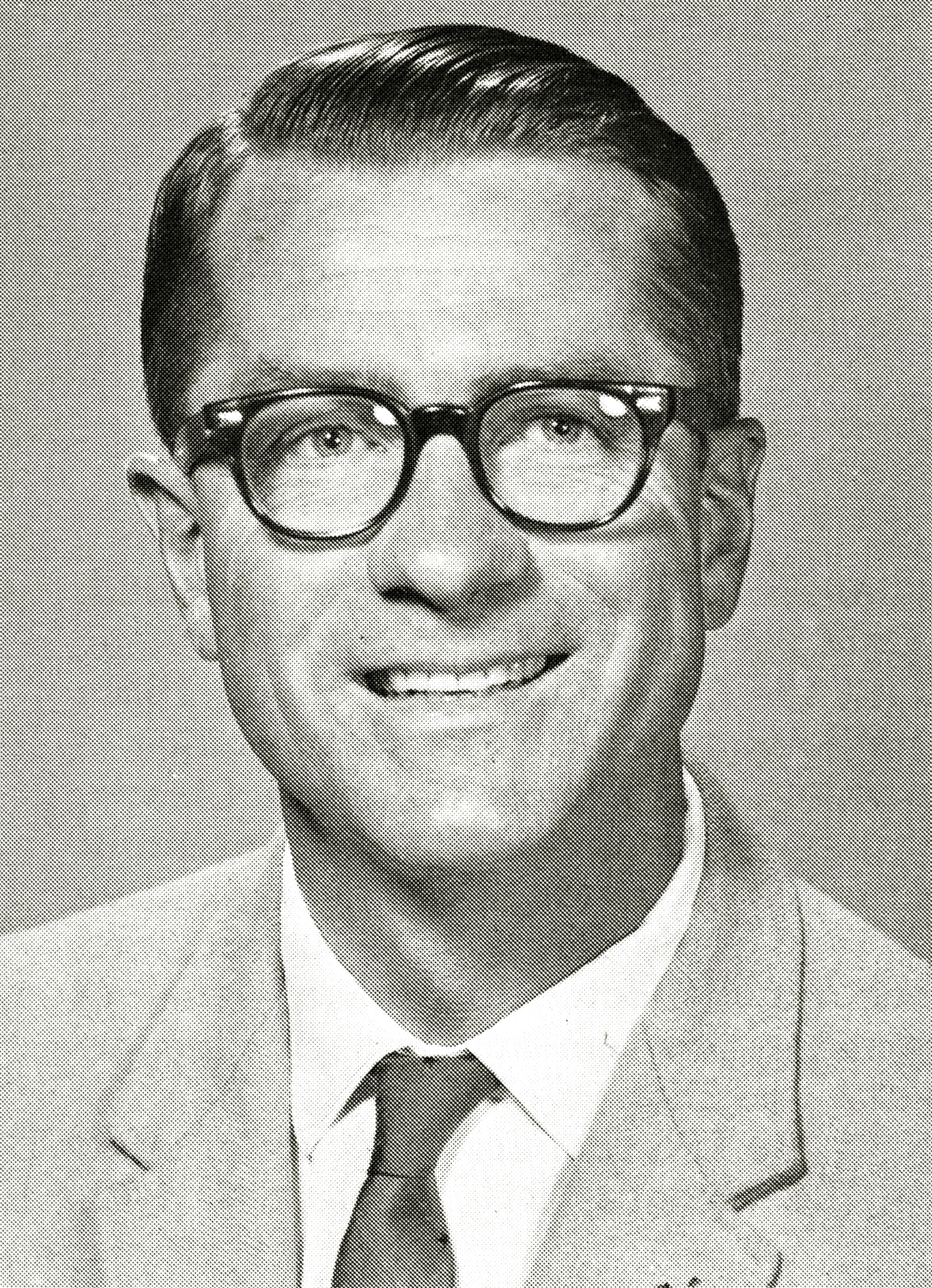
Lowell Thomas Jr.

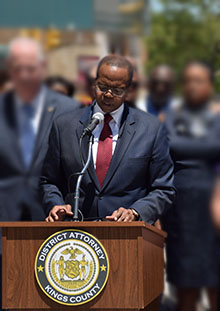
Kenneth P. Thompson

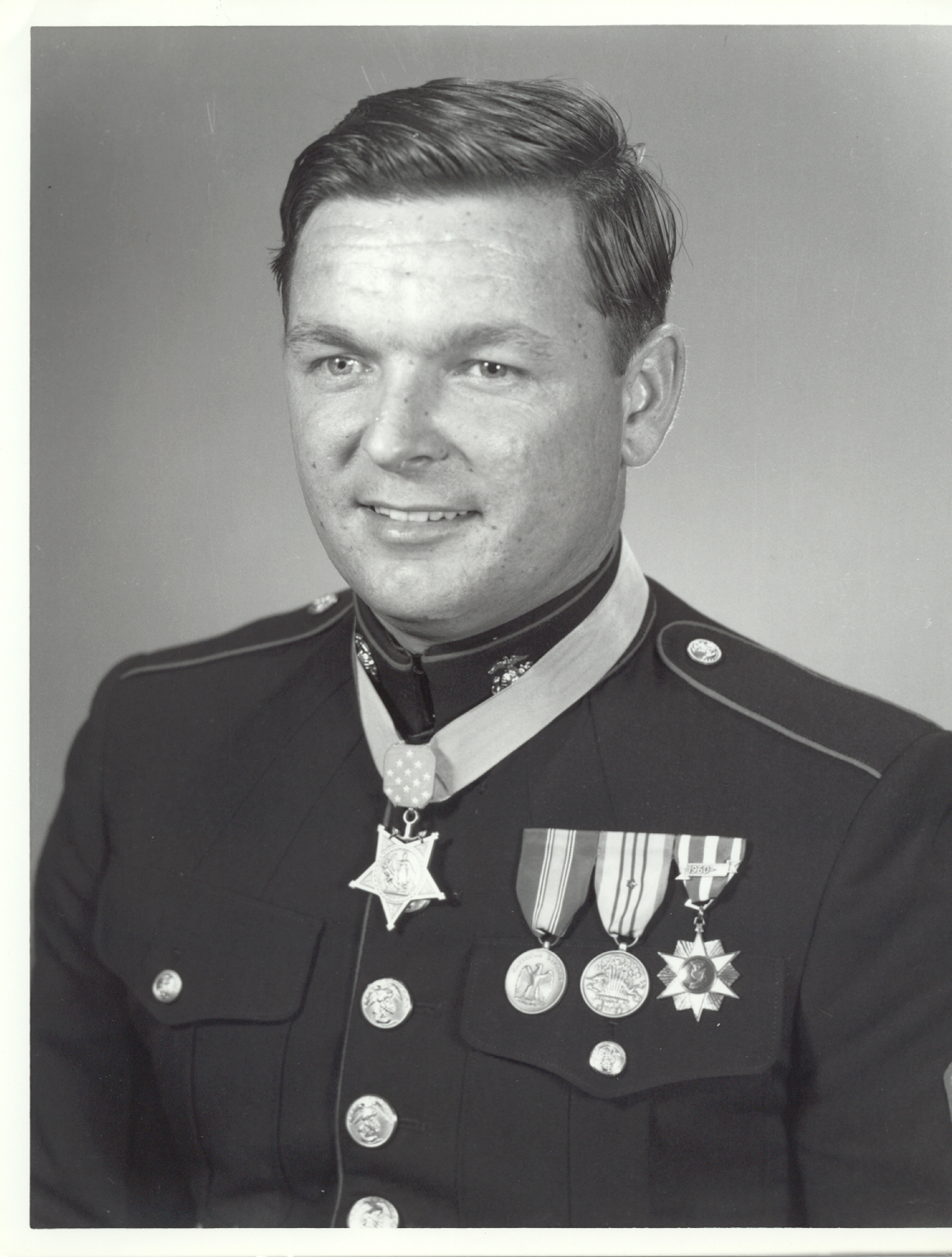
Richard A. Pittman

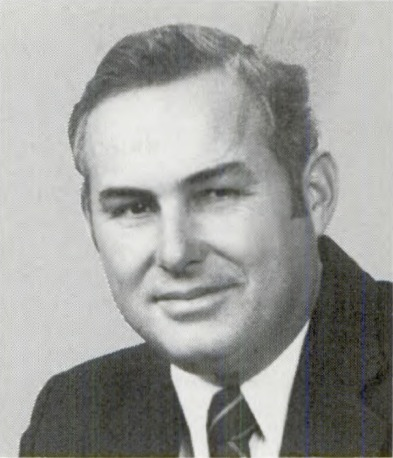
Clyde C. Holloway

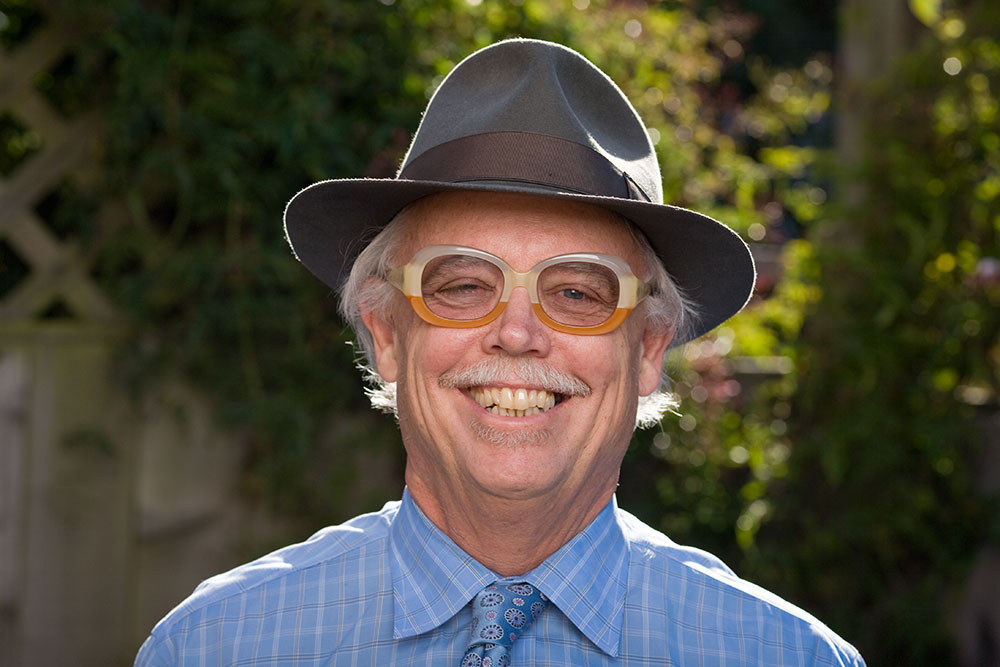
David Bunnell

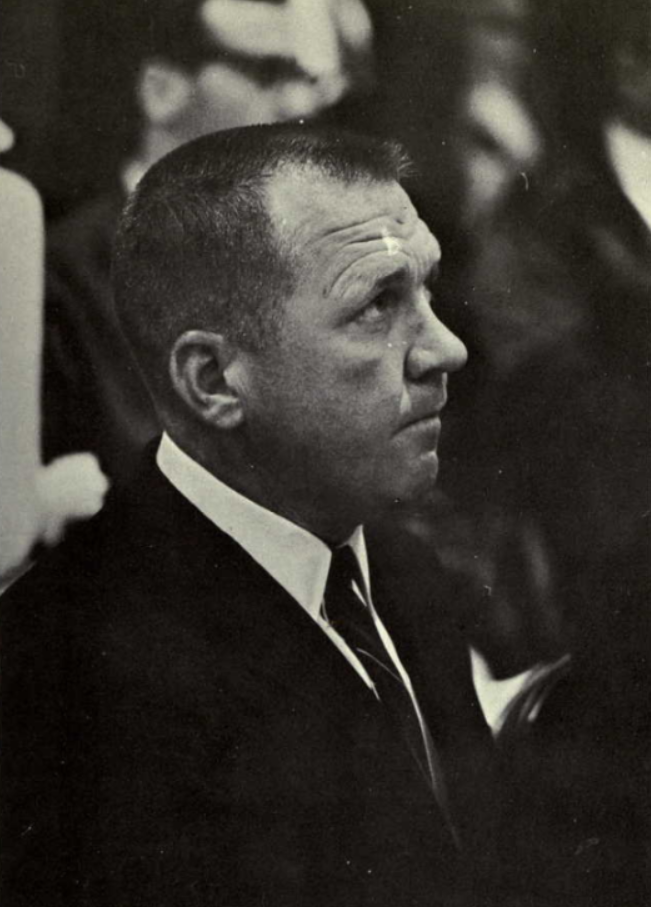
Tommy Bartlett

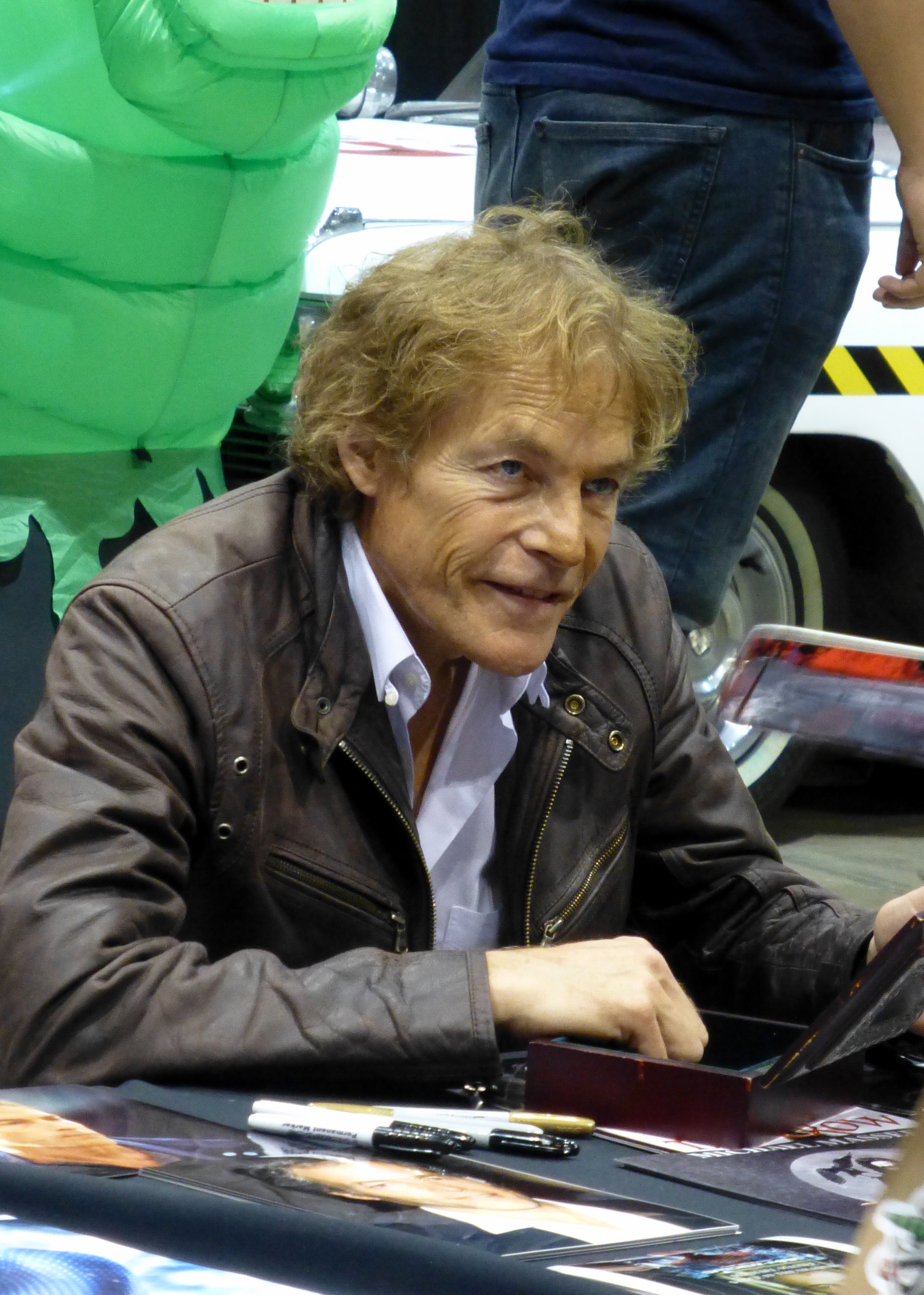
Michael Massee

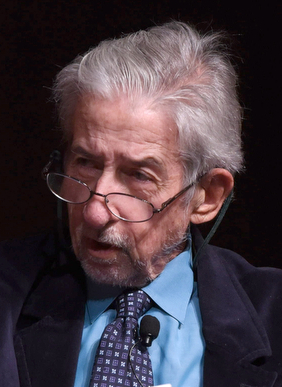
Tom Hayden

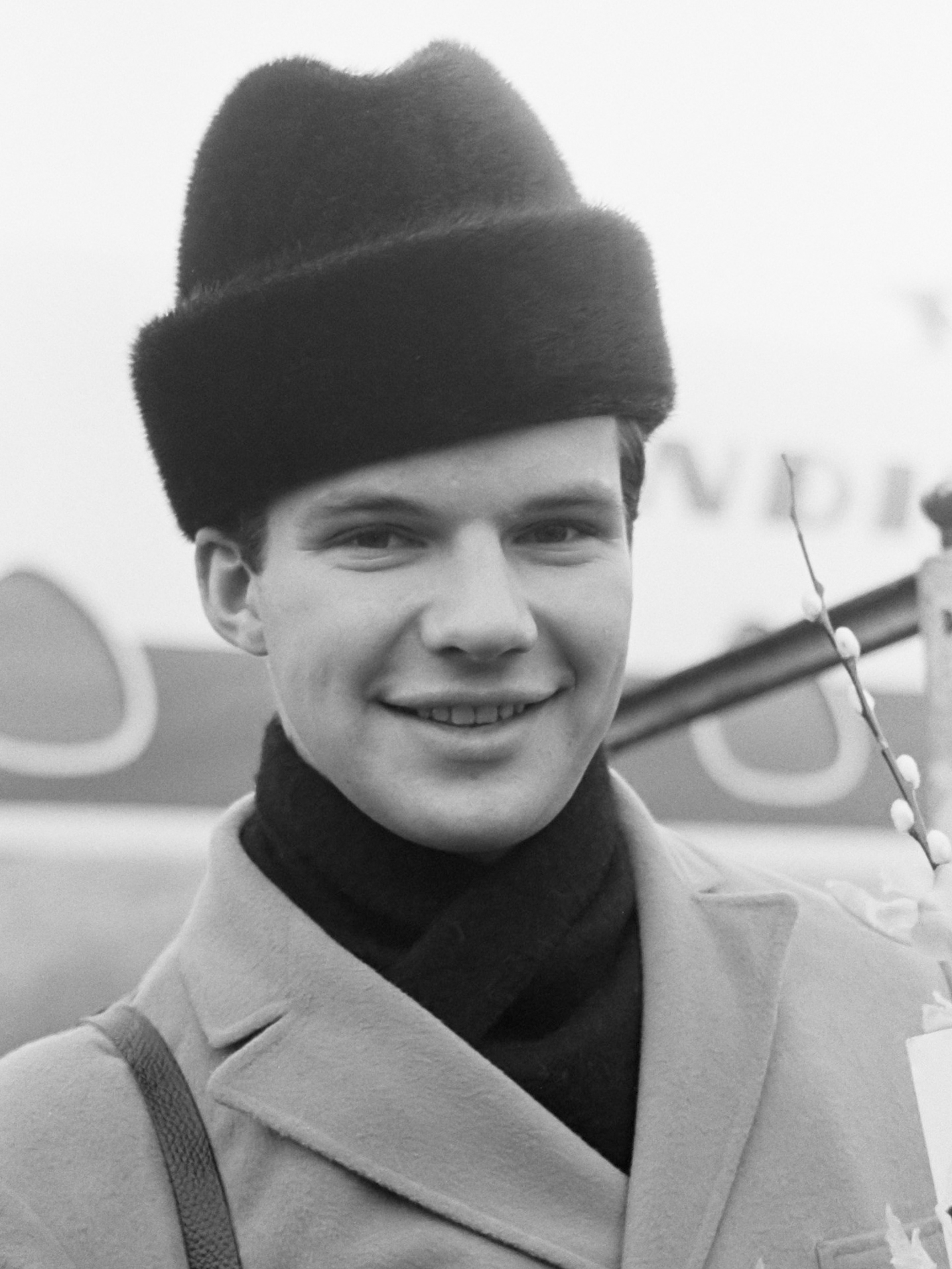
Bobby Vee

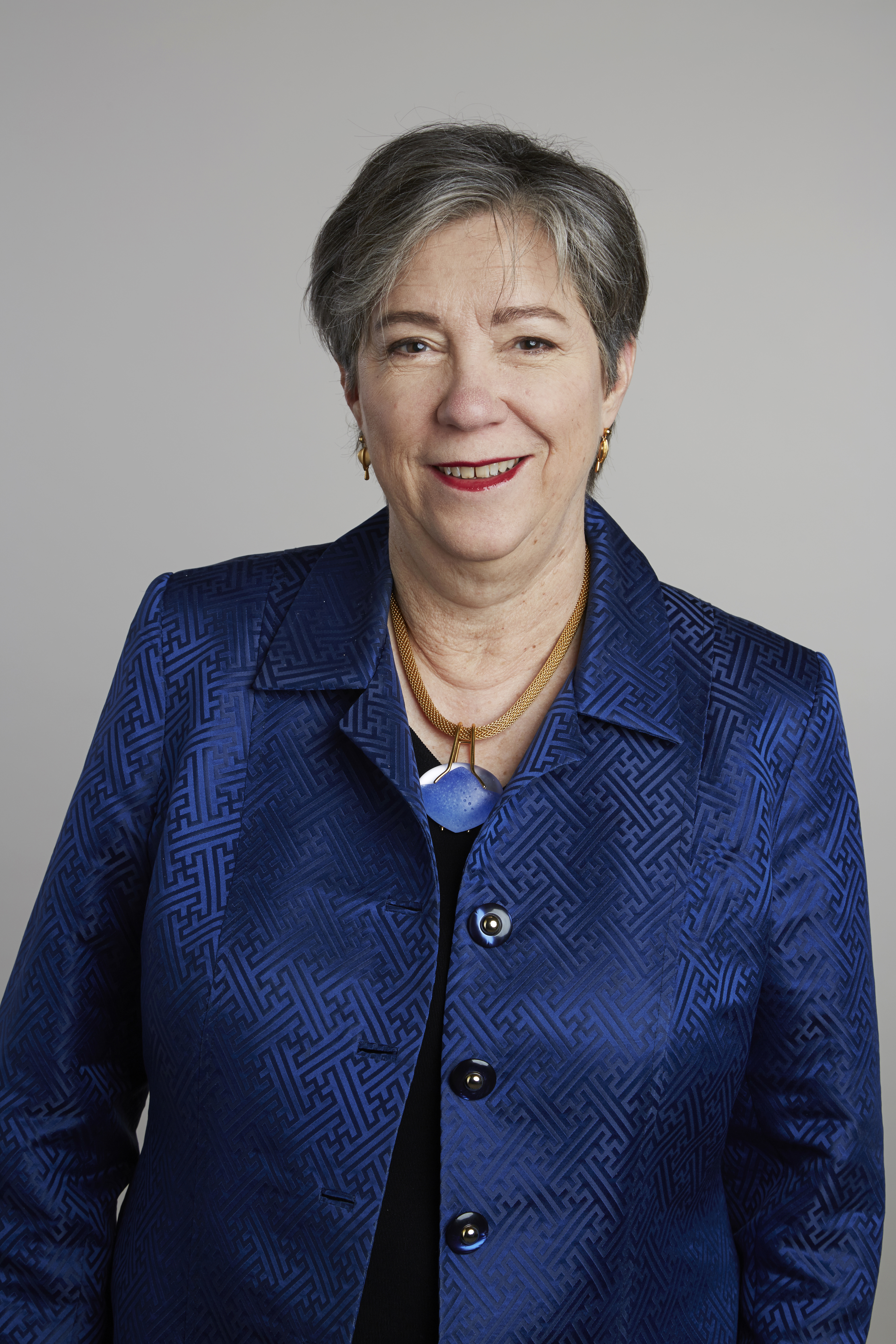
Susan Lindquist

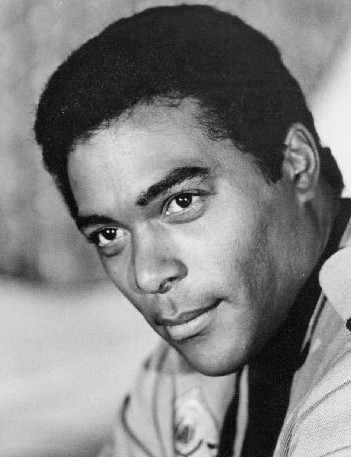
Don Marshall

- October 1
  - Bobby Burnett, football player (born 1943)
  - Roger Theder, football player and coach (born 1939)
  - Lowell Thomas Jr., British-born film producer and politician (born 1923)
- October 2
  - Walter Darby Bannard, painter (born 1934)
  - Gordon Davidson, stage and film director (born 1933)
  - Gary Reed, comics writer and publisher (born 1956)
- October 4
  - Kenneth Angell, Roman Catholic prelate (born 1930)
  - Ivan C. Lafayette, politician (born 1930)
  - Ned Randolph, politician (born 1942)
  - Donald H. White, composer (born 1921)
- October 5
  - Dick Haugland, biochemist and philanthropist (born 1943)
  - Cameron Moore, basketball player (born 1990)
  - Josh Samman, mixed martial artist (born 1988)
  - Brock Yates, journalist and author (born 1933)
- October 6
  - Hans W. Becherer, business executive (born 1935)
  - George Pernicano, businessman and NFL owner (born 1917)
- October 7 – Bill Warren, film historian and critic (born 1943)
- October 8
  - Peter Allen, radio broadcaster (born 1920)
  - Don Ciccone, singer and songwriter (born 1946)
  - Gary Dubin, actor (born 1959)
  - Jacob Neusner, Jewish scholar and theologian (born 1932)
- October 9
  - Santo DiPietro, businessman and politician (born 1934)
  - Donn Fendler, wilderness survivor, author, and public speaker (born 1926)
  - Aaron Pryor, boxer (born 1955)
  - Kenneth P. Thompson, lawyer and politician (born 1966)
- October 10
  - Tony Adamowicz, racing driver (born 1941)
  - Leo Beranek, acoustic engineer and academic (born 1914)
  - Lorenzo Freeman, football player (born 1964)
  - John Vaughn, Franciscan Catholic leader (born 1928)
- October 11
  - David Antin, poet (born 1932)
  - Tom Barnes, journalist (born 1946)
  - Patricia Barry, actress (born 1922)
- October 12
  - Thomas Mikal Ford, actor (born 1964)
  - Jack Greenberg, civil rights lawyer and legal scholar (born 1924)
  - Rick Gudex, businessman and politician (born 1968)
  - Dylan Rieder, skateboarder and model (born 1988)
  - Fulton Walker, football player (born 1958)
- October 13
  - Richard A. Pittman, U.S. Marine and Medal of Honor winner (born 1945)
  - Louis Stettner, photographer (born 1922)
- October 14
  - Lucy Baxley, politician; 28th Lieutenant Governor of Alabama (born 1937)
  - Edward Gorman, author (born 1941)
  - Thom Jones, author (born 1945)
- October 15
  - Dennis Byrd, football player (born 1966)
  - Quentin Groves, football player (born 1984)
  - Bruce Marshall, ice hockey coach (born 1962)
- October 16
  - Clyde C. Holloway, politician and businessman (born 1943)
  - Ted V. Mikels, film producer, director, and screenwriter (born 1929)
  - Joseph A. Suozzi, Italian-born attorney and judge (born 1921)
- October 17
  - Eddie Applegate, actor (born 1935)
  - Edgar Munhall, art historian and curator (born 1933)
  - Irwin Smigel, dentist and entrepreneur (born 1924)
  - Morris Stroud, football player (born 1946)
- October 18
  - Anthony Addabbo, actor (born 1960)
  - David Bunnell, businessman, writer, and publisher (born 1947)
- October 19
  - Tommy Bartlett, basketball and tennis player and coach (born 1928)
  - Phil Chess, Polish-born record producer and music executive (born 1921)
- October 20
  - William G. Bowen, academic and university president (born 1933)
  - Gail Cogdill, football player (born 1937)
  - Michael Massee, actor (born 1952)
  - Simone Schaller, Olympic hurdler (b, 1912)
- October 21
  - Dan Johnston, lawyer and politician
  - Kevin Meaney, comedian and actor (born 1956)
- October 22
  - Gavin MacFadyen, journalist and documentary filmmaker (born 1940)
  - Monarchos, racehorse and stallion (born 1998)
  - Sheri S. Tepper, author (born 1929)
  - Bob Vanatta, basketball coach (born 1918)
- October 23
  - Jack Chick, cartoonist, publisher, and Christian fundamentalist (born 1924)
  - Tom Hayden, writer, activist, and politician (born 1939)
  - Bob Saunders, politician (born 1929)
- October 24
  - Bobby Vee, pop singer and actor (born 1943)
  - Charles Wolf Jr., economist (born 1924)
- October 25
  - Kevin Curran, television writer (born 1957)
  - Mel Haber, hotelier, restaurateur, and philanthropist (born 1935)
  - Bob Hoover, U.S. Air Force pilot (born 1922)
  - Burnet R. Maybank Jr., lawyer and politician (born 1924)
- October 26
  - Donald C. Pogue, federal judge (born 1947)
  - Vic Rapp, football coach (born 1929)
- October 27
  - Jim Eddy, football coach (born 1936)
  - Susan Lindquist, biologist (born 1949)
  - David Tyack, historian (born 1930)
  - John Zacherle, television and radio personality and voice actor (born 1918)
- October 28 – Angeline Kopka, businesswoman and politician (born 1916)
- October 29
  - Robert Belfanti, politician (born 1948)
  - Norman Brokaw, talent agent (born 1927)
  - E. Lee Hennessee, hedge fund manager
  - John Hicks, football player (born 1951)
  - Paul Luebke, politician (born 1946)
  - John D. Roberts, chemist (born 1918)
  - Barry Stout, politician (born 1936)
- October 30
  - James Galanos, fashion designer (born 1924)
  - Tammy Grimes, actress and singer (born 1934)
  - Betty Ann Kennedy, contract bridge player (born 1930)
  - Gil Krueger, football coach (born 1929)
  - Don Marshall, actor (born 1936)
  - Curly Putman, songwriter (born 1930)
- October 31
  - Natalie Babbitt, children's author and illustrator (born 1932)
  - Andy Hill, politician (born 1962)
  - Gene La Rocque, U.S. Navy admiral (born 1918)
  - Klaus Schulten, German-born biophysicist (born 1947)

=== November ===
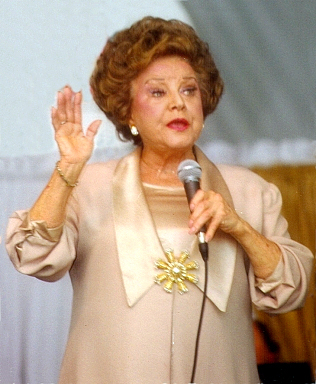
Kay Starr

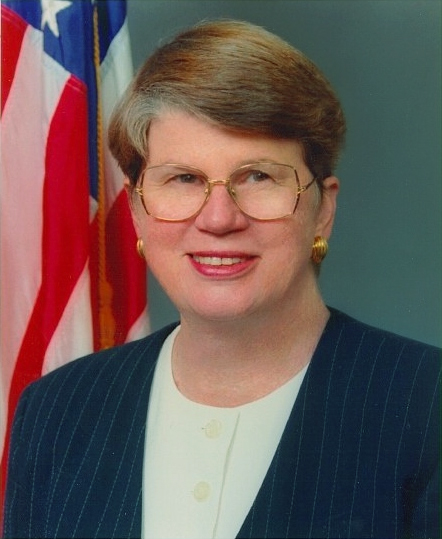
Janet Reno

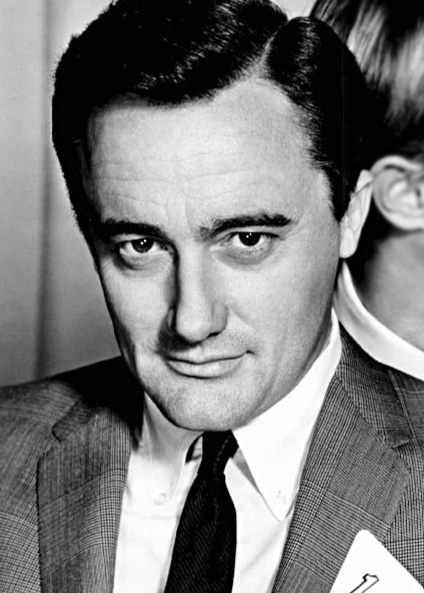
Robert Vaughn

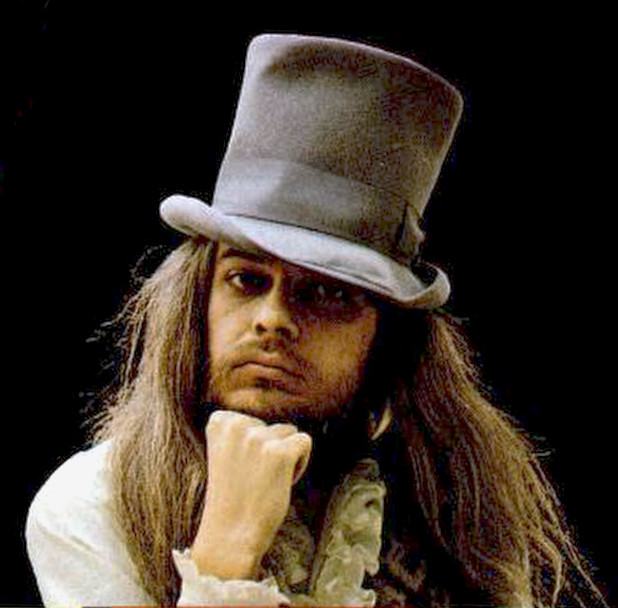
Leon Russell

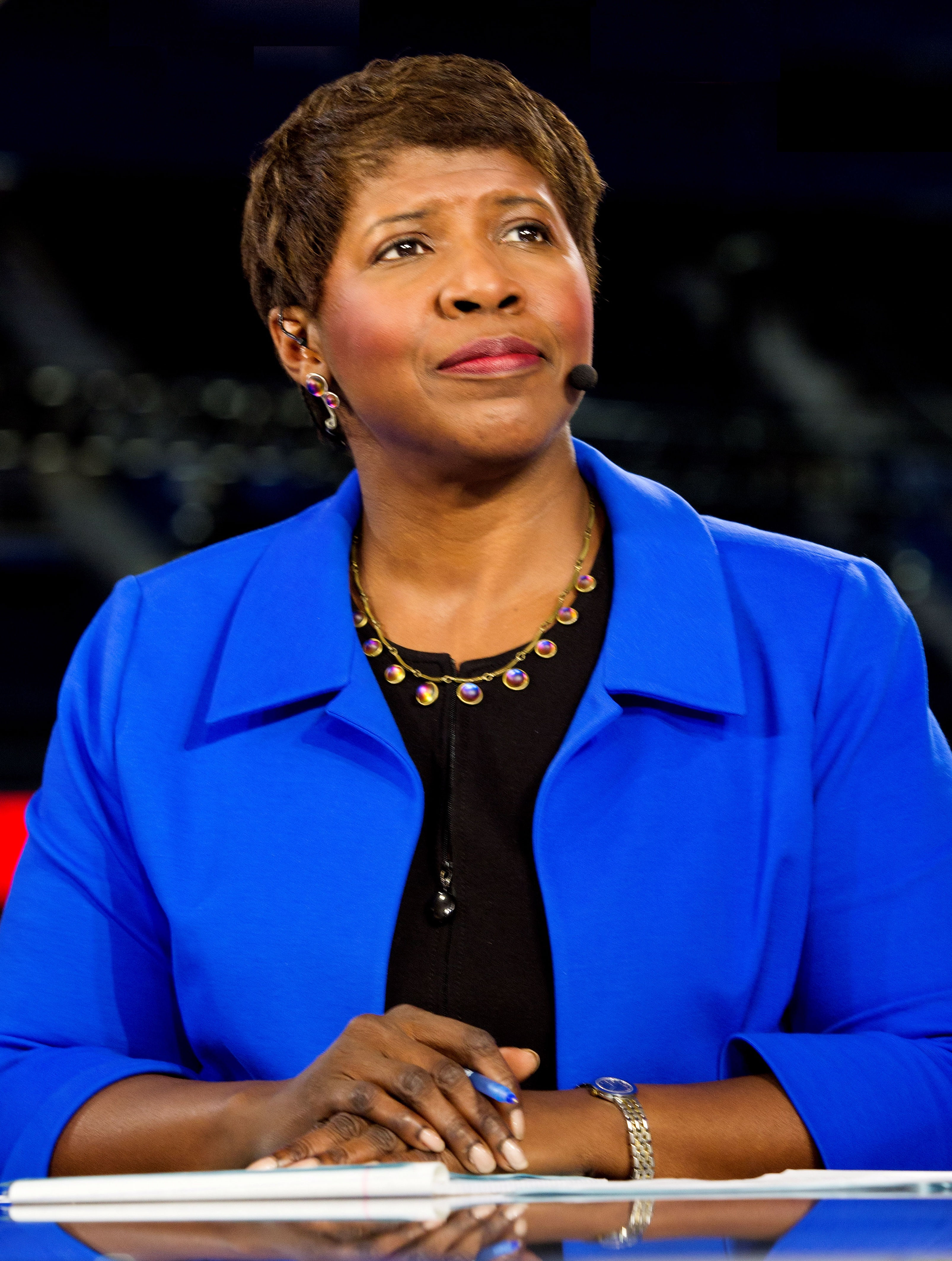
Gwen Ifill

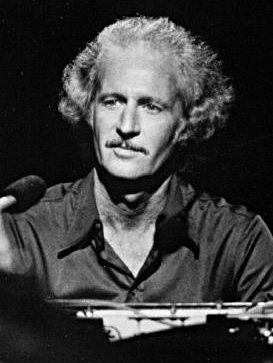
Mose Allison

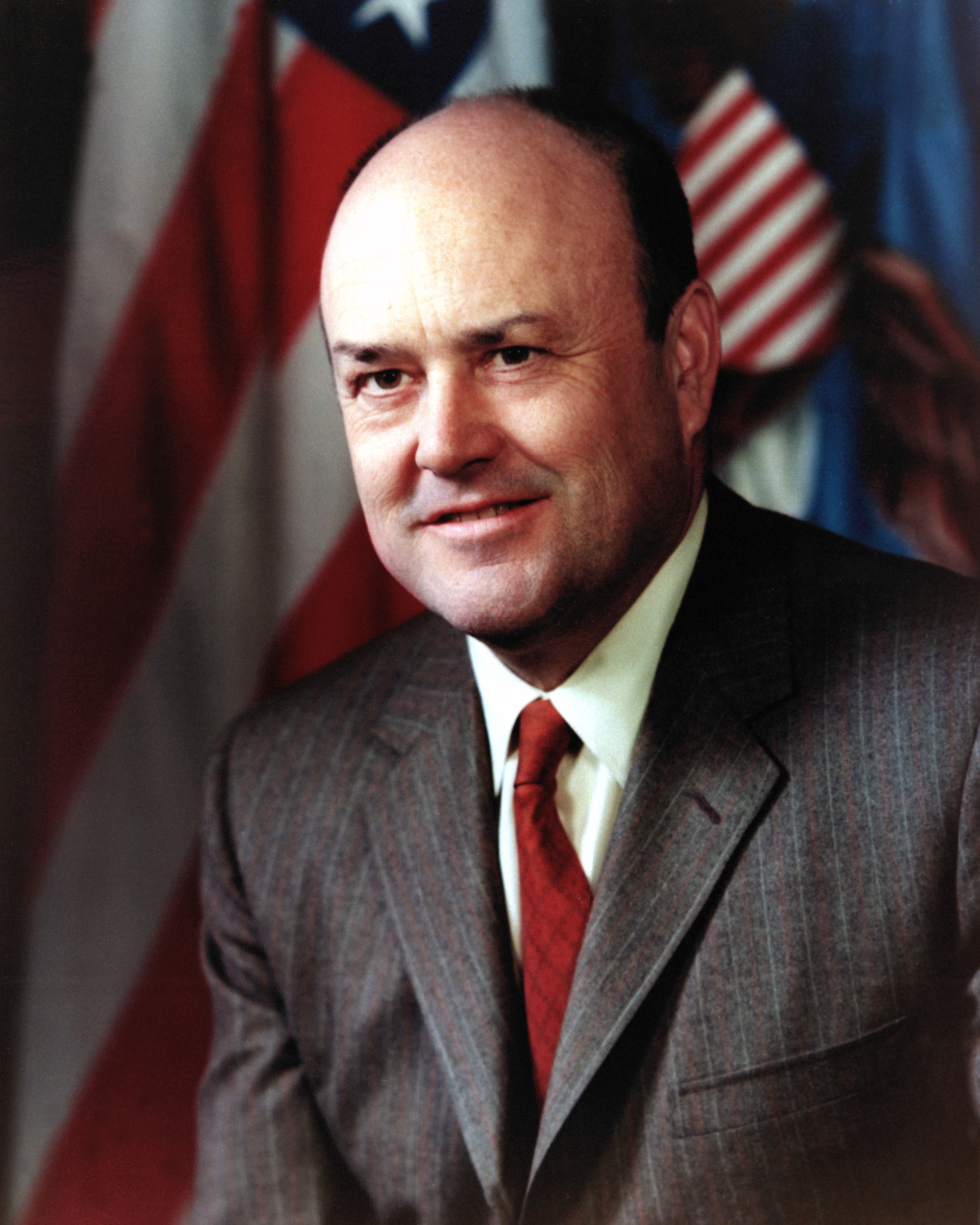
Melvin Laird

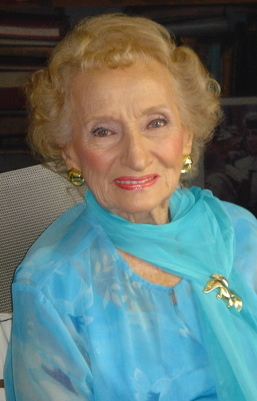
Ruth Gruber

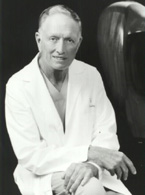
Denton Cooley

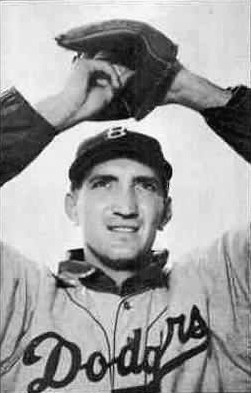
Ralph Branca

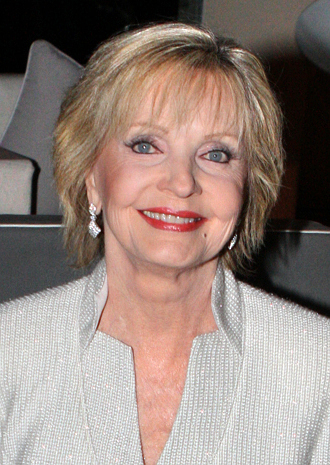
Florence Henderson

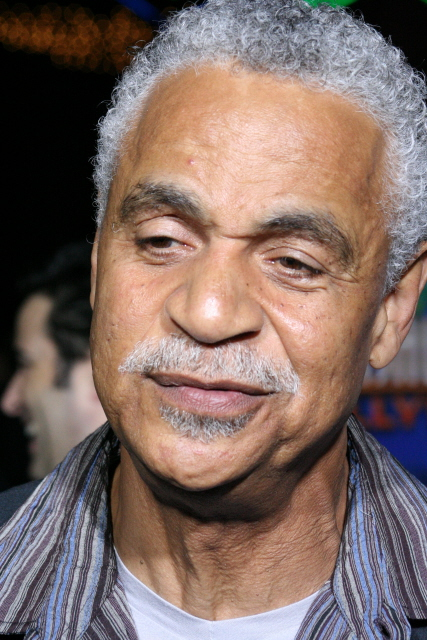
Ron Glass

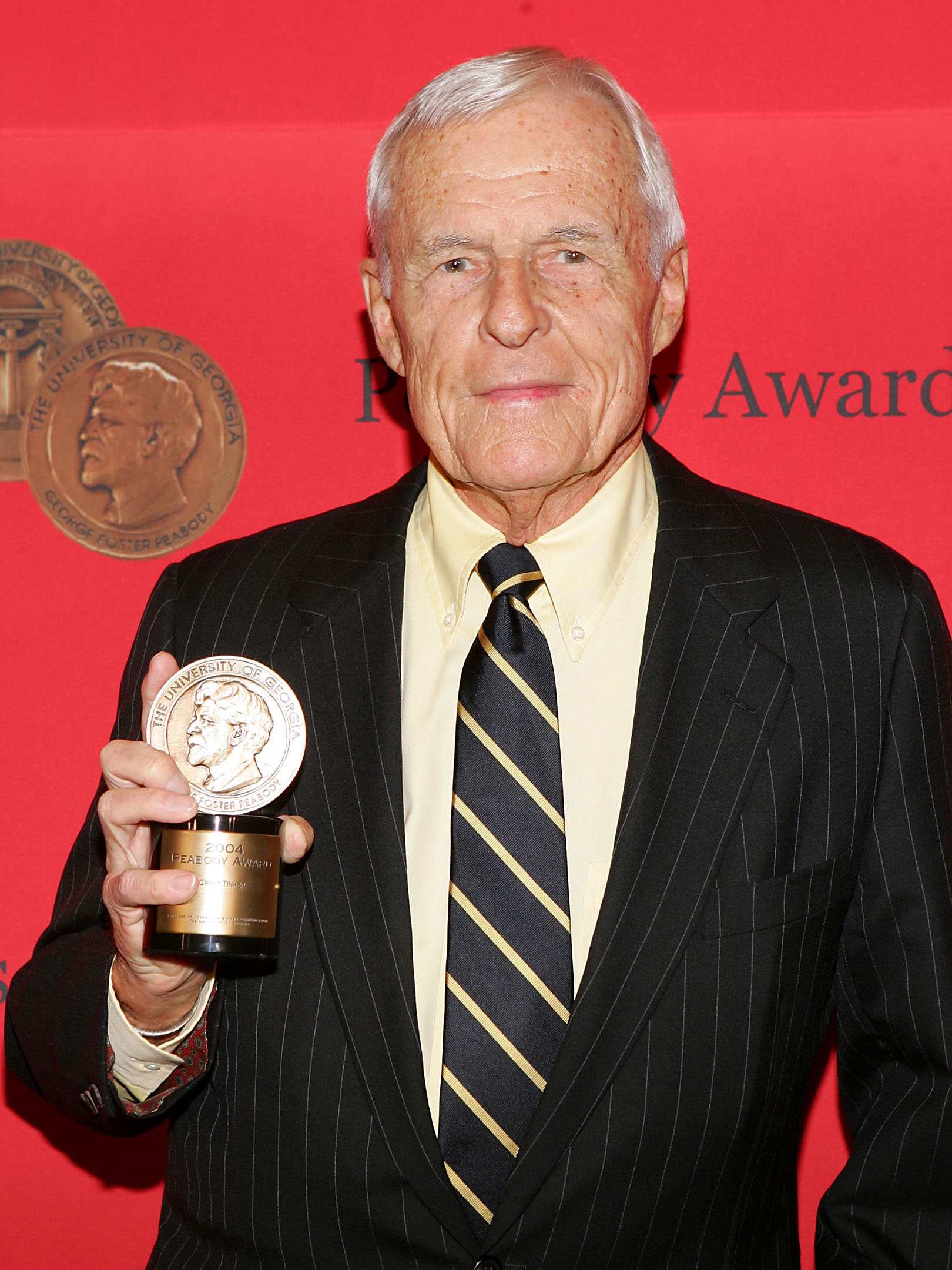
Grant Tinker

- November 1
  - Don Kates, lawyer and criminologist (born 1941)
  - Stanford Lipsey, newspaper publisher (born 1927)
  - John Orsino, baseball player (born 1938)
- November 2
  - Max Alexander, comedian and actor (born 1953)
  - Bob Cranshaw, jazz bassist (born 1932)
  - Jud Kinberg, film producer and screenwriter (born 1925)
  - Dolores Klosowski, baseball player (born 1923)
  - A. Thomas Kraabel, classical scholar (born 1934)
  - Jan Slepian, children's author and poet (born 1921)
- November 3
  - Kay Starr, singer (born 1922)
  - Rick Steiner, theatrical producer (born 1946)
- November 4
  - Eddie Carnett, baseball player (born 1916)
  - DeVan Dallas, politician (born 1926)
  - Allen Eller, soccer player (born 1976)
- November 5
  - Ralph Cicerone, atmospheric scientist (born 1943)
  - W. Eugene Hansen, religious leader (born 1928)
  - Arnold Mesches, visual artist (born 1923)
- November 7
  - Leonard Cohen, Canadian singer-songwriter and writer (born 1934)
  - Phil Georgeff, horse racing announcer (born 1931)
  - Julie Gregg, actress (born 1937)
  - Janet Reno, lawyer; U.S. Attorney General (1993–2001) (born 1938)
- November 8
  - Yaffa Eliach, Polish-born historian and Holocaust survivor (born 1937)
  - Junius Foy Guin Jr., federal judge (born 1924)
  - Bill Lapham, football player (born 1934)
- November 9
  - Greg Ballard, basketball player and assistant coach (born 1955)
  - Al Caiola, guitarist and composer (born 1920)
  - Russ Nixon, baseball player (born 1935)
- November 10
  - David Adamany, political scientist and academic administrator (born 1936)
  - Bill Stanfill, football player (born 1947)
- November 11
  - Victor Bailey, bassist (born 1960)
  - Greg Horton, football player (born 1951)
  - Claire Labine, television writer and producer (born 1934)
  - Aileen Mehle, gossip columnist (born 1918)
  - Robert Vaughn, actor (born 1932)
- November 12
  - Jerry Dumas, cartoonist (born 1930)
  - Howard Ruff, economist and investment writer (born 1930)
  - Lupita Tovar, Mexican-American actress (born 1910)
- November 13
  - Lary Kuharich, football coach (born 1945)
  - Billy Miller, music archivist (born 1954)
  - Leon Russell, musician and songwriter (born 1942)
- November 14
  - Diana Balmori, landscape designer (born 1932)
  - Houston Conwill, sculptor (born 1947)
  - Holly Dunn, country music singer and songwriter (born 1957)
  - Bob Gain, football player (born 1929)
  - Roger Hobbs, novelist (born 1988)
  - Gwen Ifill, journalist, television newscaster, and author (born 1955)
  - Mahpiya Ska, albino buffalo (born 1996)
  - David Mancuso, club DJ (born 1944)
  - Gardnar Mulloy, tennis player (born 1913)
- November 15
  - Bob Addis, baseball player (born 1925)
  - Mose Allison, jazz pianist, vocalist, and composer (born 1927)
  - Dwayne Andreas, businessman and political donor (born 1918)
  - Cliff Barrows, gospel singer and music director (born 1923)
  - Jules Eskin, cellist (born 1931)
  - Lisa Lynn Masters, actress (born 1964)
  - Milt Okun, record producer, arranger. conductor, and singer (born 1923)
  - Clift Tsuji, politician (born 1941)
- November 16
  - Jay Wright Forrester, computer engineer (born 1918)
  - Melvin Laird, politician; U.S. Secretary of Defense (1969–1973) (born 1922)
  - Daniel Leab, German-born historian (born 1936)
  - Larry Tucker, politician (born 1935)
  - Mentor Williams, songwriter and record producer (born 1946)
- November 17
  - Ruth Gruber, photojournalist and humanitarian (born 1911)
  - Whitney Smith, vexillologist and flag designer (born 1940)
- November 18
  - Denton Cooley, heart surgeon (born 1920)
  - Sharon Jones, soul and funk singer (born 1956)
  - Yevgeni Lazarev, Russian-born actor (born 1937)
- November 19
  - Monk Bonasorte, football player (born 1957)
  - John C. Carpenter, rancher and politician (born 1930)
  - Irving A. Fradkin, optometrist and philanthropist (born 1921)
  - Ida Levin, violinist (born 1963)
  - Paul Sylbert, production designer (born 1928)
- November 20
  - Gene Guarilia, basketball player (born 1937)
  - Janellen Huttenlocher, psychologist (born 1932)
  - Hod O'Brien, jazz pianist (born 1936)
- November 21 – Edward L. Kimball, legal scholar (born 1930)
- November 23
  - Peggy Kirk Bell, golfer (born 1921)
  - Ralph Branca, baseball player (born 1926)
  - Joe Esposito, author and publisher (born 1938)
  - Jerry Tucker, child actor (born 1925)
- November 24
  - Franklin Bishop, politician (born 1932)
  - Al Brodax, film and television producer (born 1926)
  - Bob Chase, radio sports announcer (born 1926)
  - John Ebersole, educator and author (born 1944)
  - Dave Ferriss, baseball player (born 1921)
  - Larry W. Fullerton, inventor
  - Florence Henderson, actress and singer (born 1934)
  - William Mandel, journalist and activist (born 1917)
- November 25
  - Colonel Abrams, musician, dancer, and actor (born 1949)
  - Erich Bloch, German-born electrical engineer (born 1925)
  - Ron Glass, actor (born 1945)
  - Dwan Hurt, basketball coach (born 1963)
  - Jake Krull, politician (born 1938)
  - Pauline Oliveros, composer and accordionist (born 1932)
  - Richard Dean Rogers, federal judge (born 1921)
- November 26
  - Harry Flournoy, basketball player (born 1943)
  - James E. McClellan, veterinarian and politician (born 1926)
  - Russell Oberlin, countertenor (born 1928)
  - Debra Saunders-White, educator (born 1957)
  - Fritz Weaver, actor (born 1925)
- November 27
  - Dick Logan, football player (born 1930)
  - Tony Martell, music industry executive and philanthropist (born 1926)
  - Bruce Mazlish, historian (born 1923)
- November 28
  - William Christenberry, photographer, painter, and sculptor (born 1936)
  - John C. Harkness, architect (born 1916)
  - Grant Tinker, television executive (born 1926)
  - Keo Woolford, actor (born 1967)
- November 29
  - Bill Bartmann, businessman (born 1948)
  - James Danieley, educator (born 1924)
  - Hardy Myers, lawyer and politician (born 1939)
- November 30
  - Alice Drummond, actress (born 1928)
  - Royce Womble, football player (b, 1931)

=== December ===
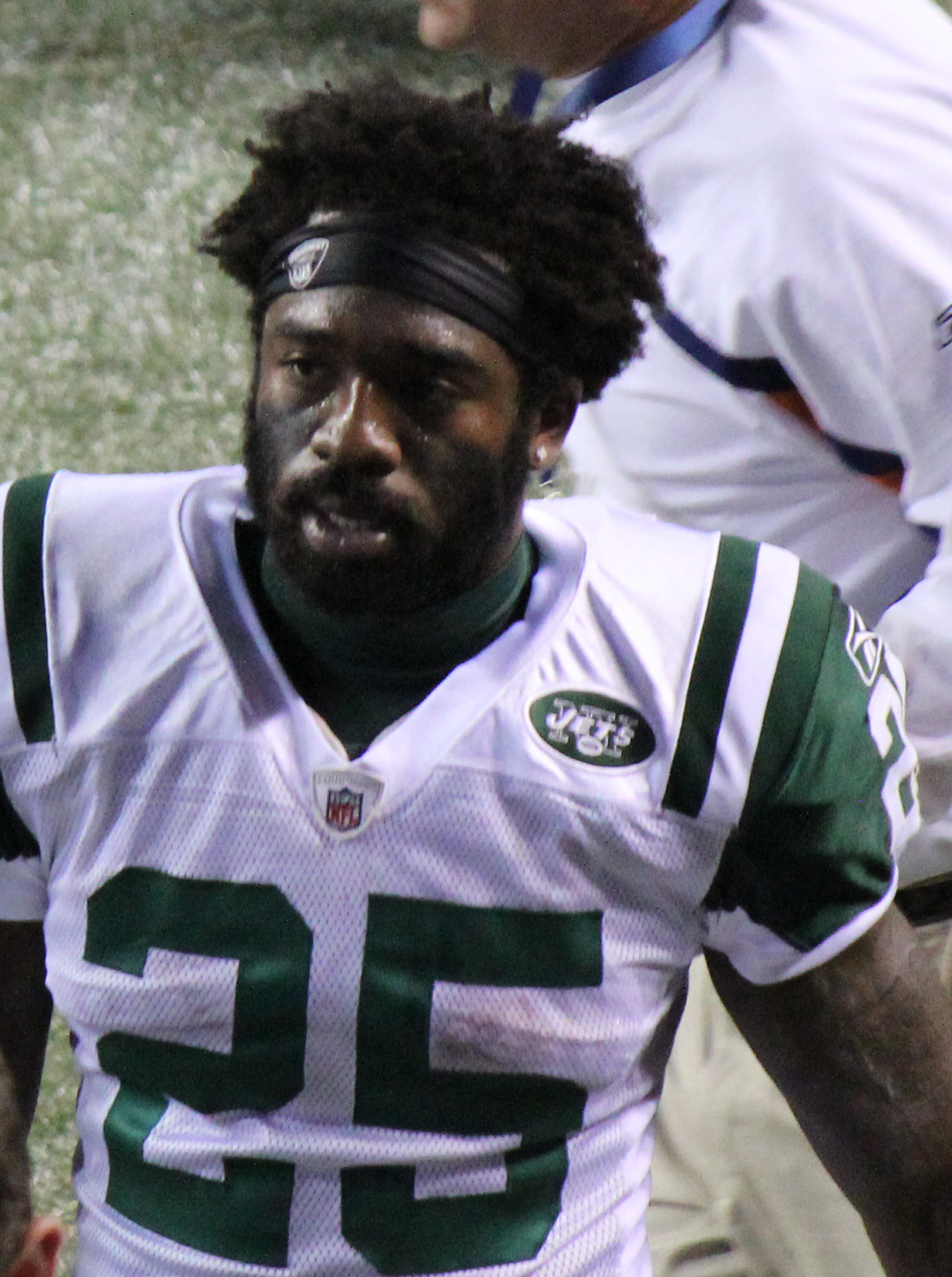
Joe McKnight

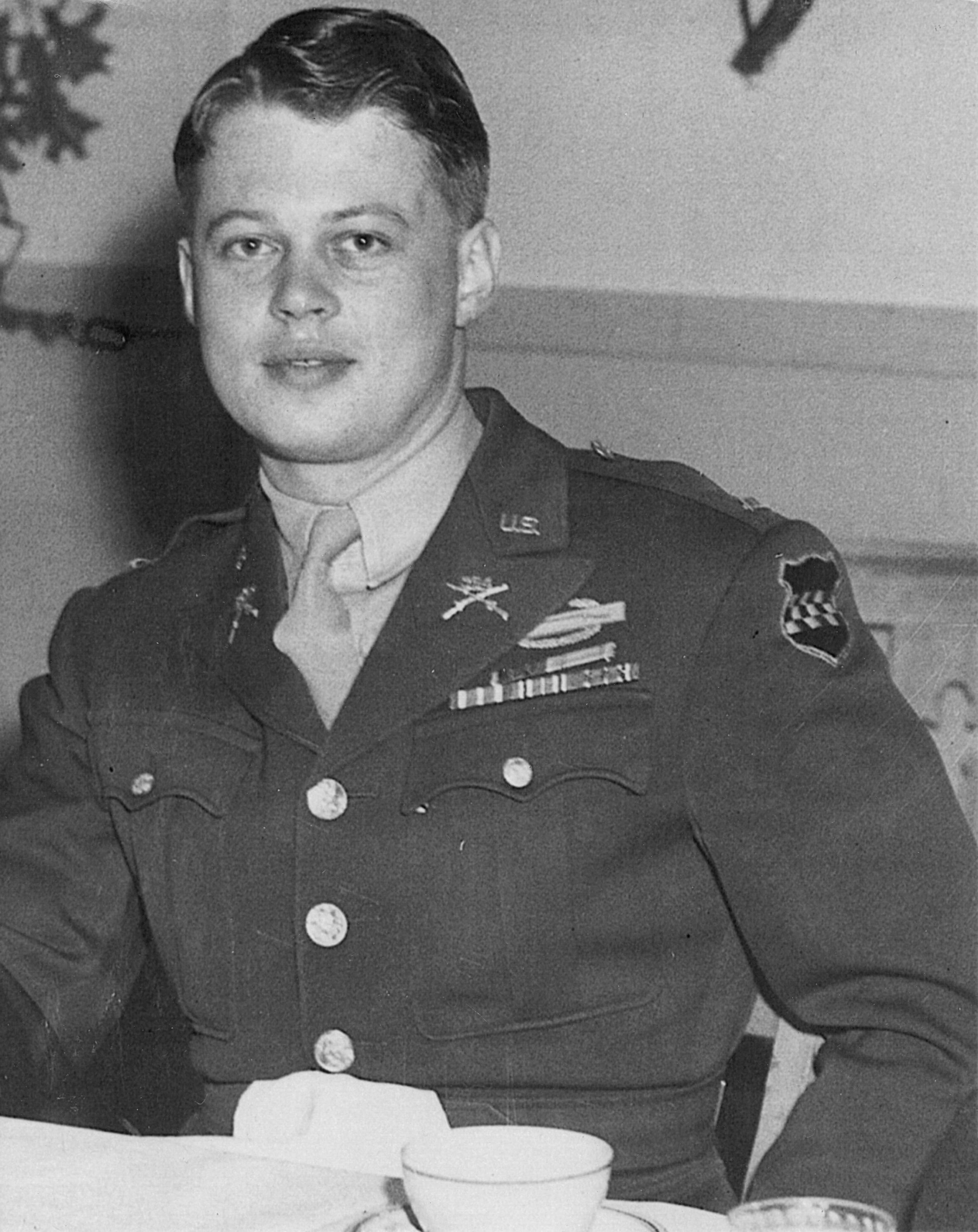
Lyle Bouck

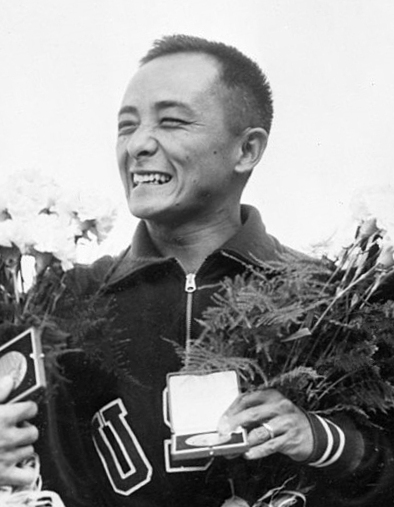
Sammy Lee

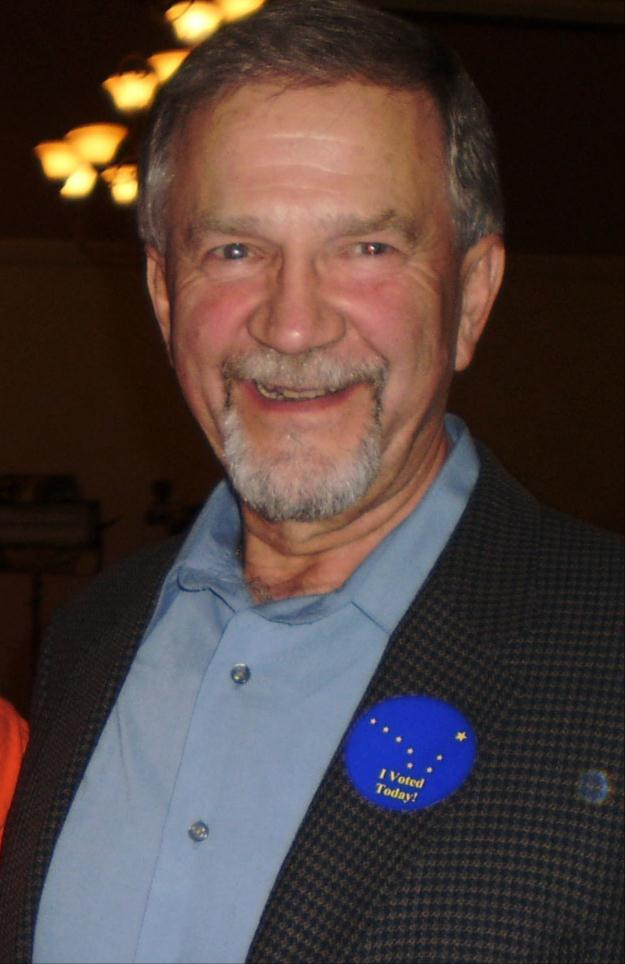
Mike Kelly

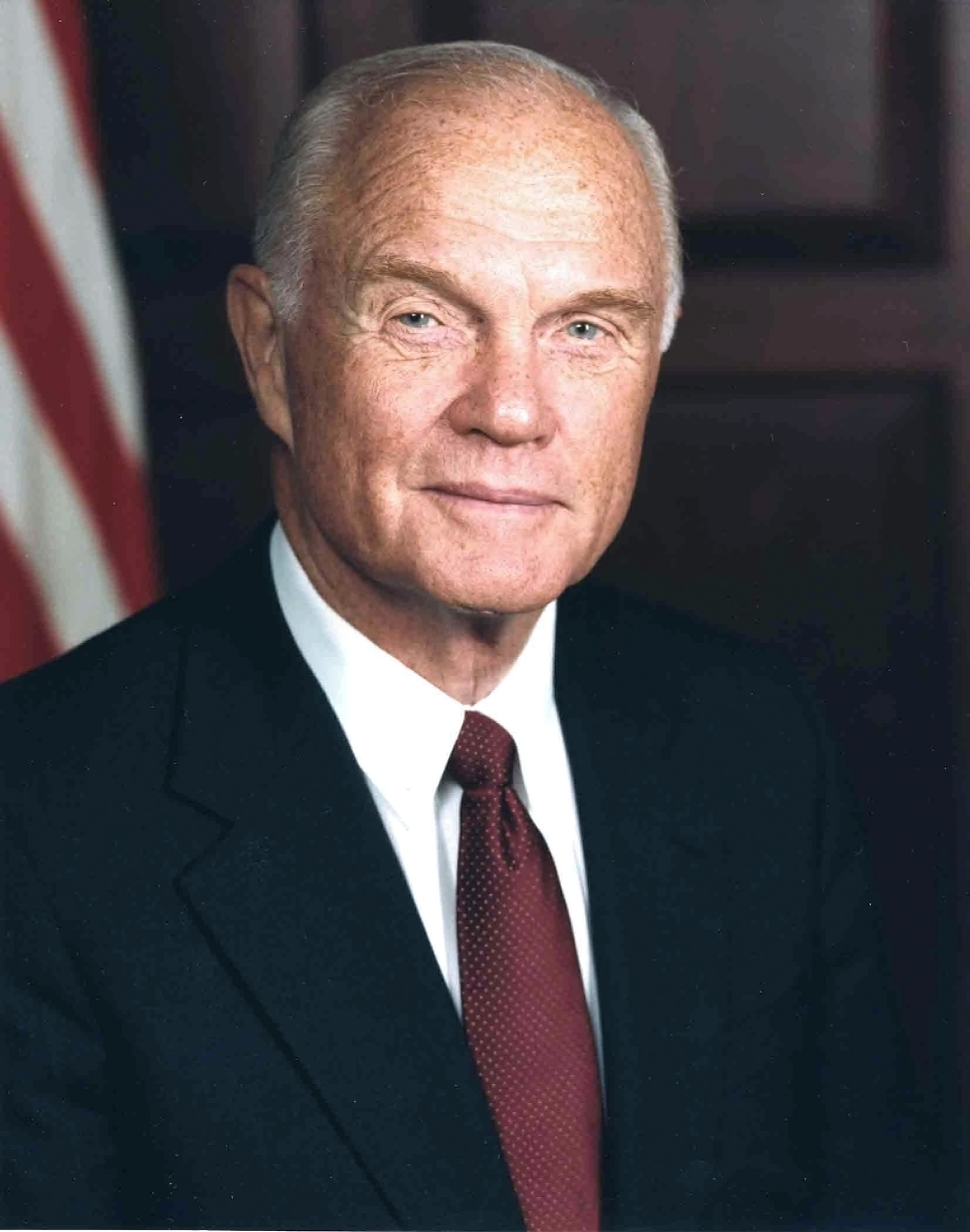
John Glenn

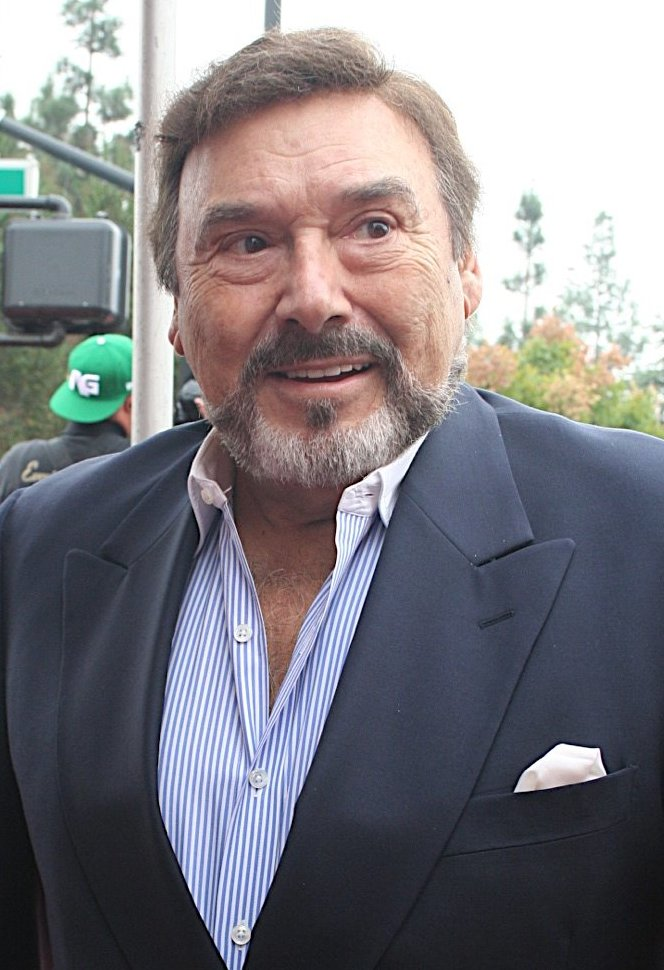
Joseph Mascolo

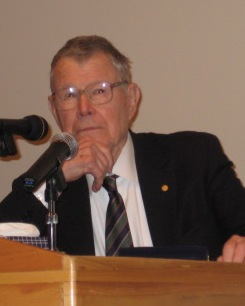
Thomas Schelling

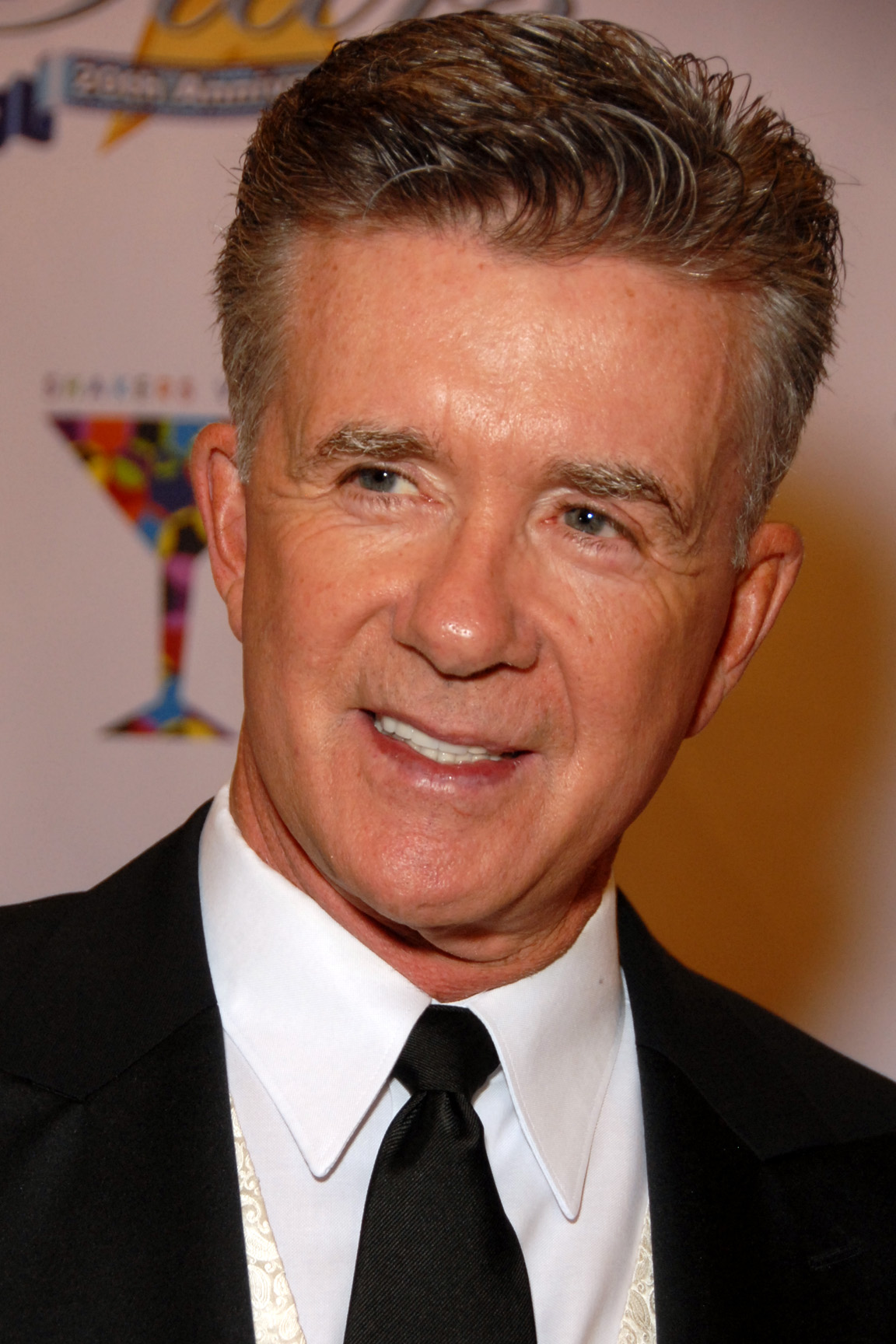
Alan Thicke

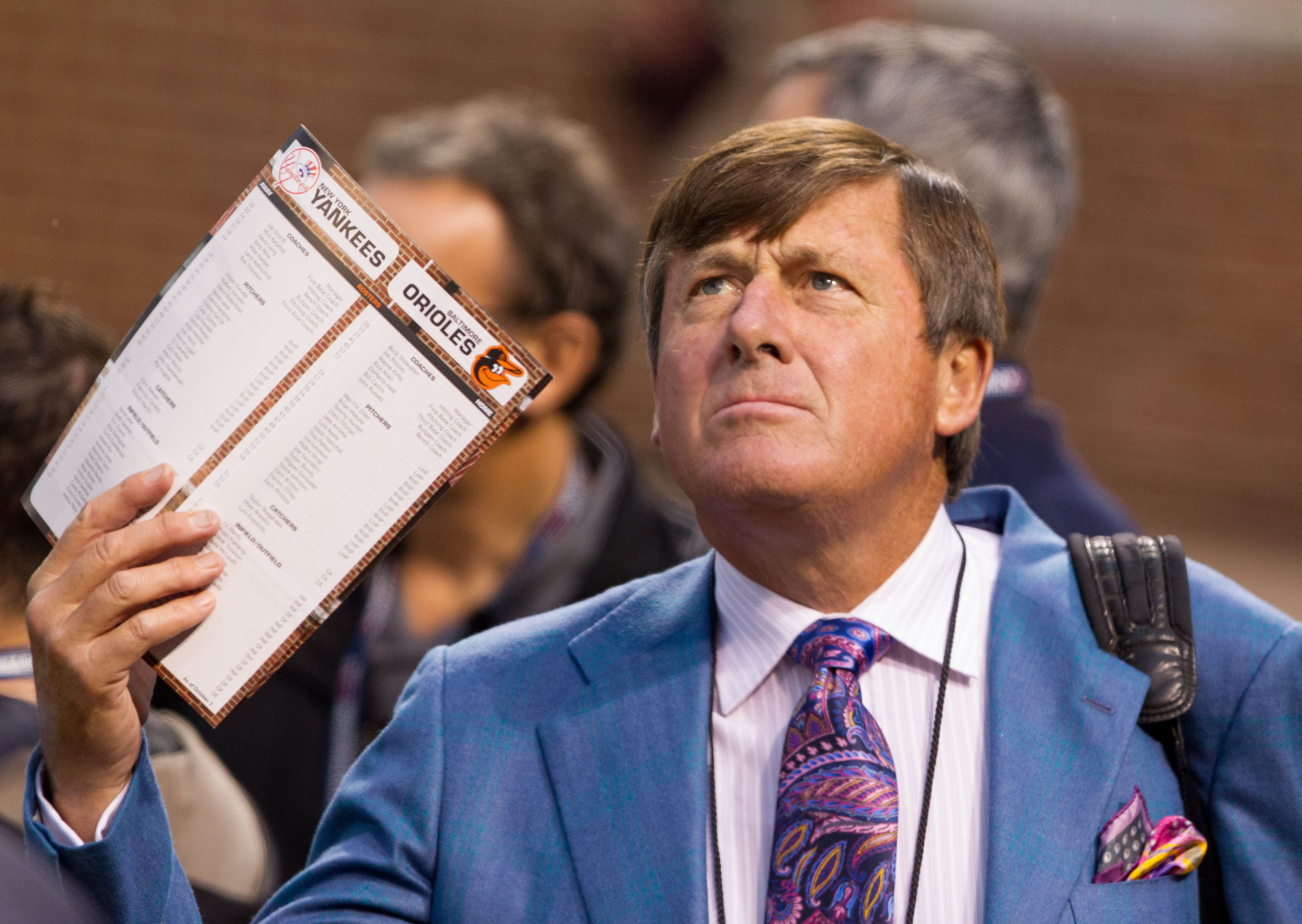
Craig Sager

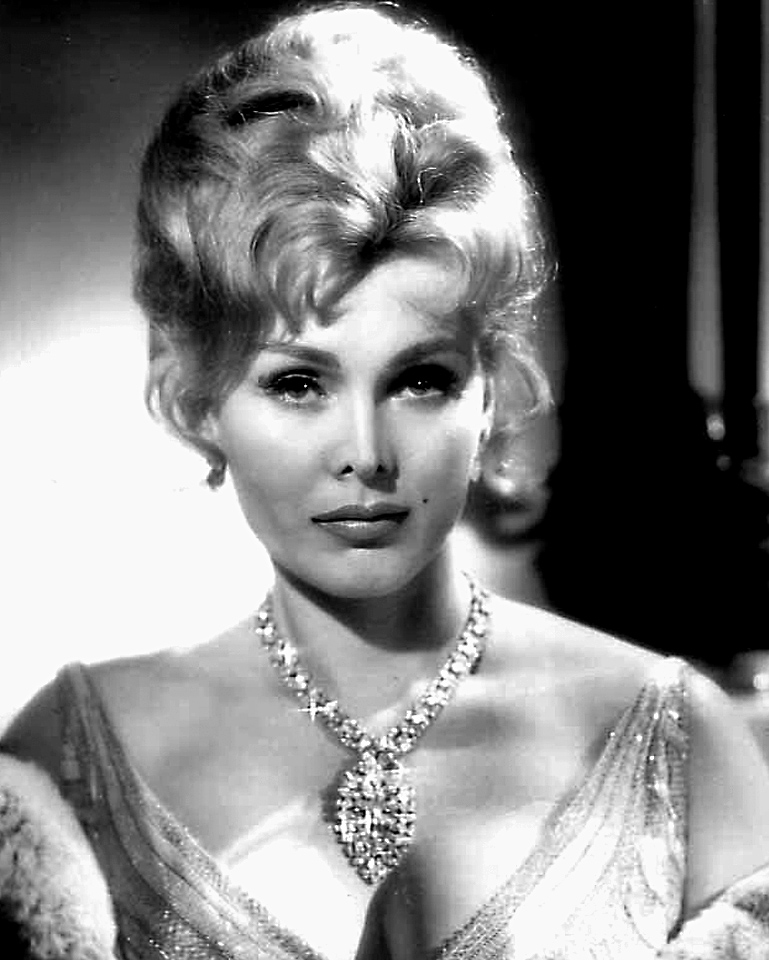
Zsa Zsa Gabor

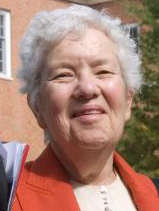
Vera Rubin

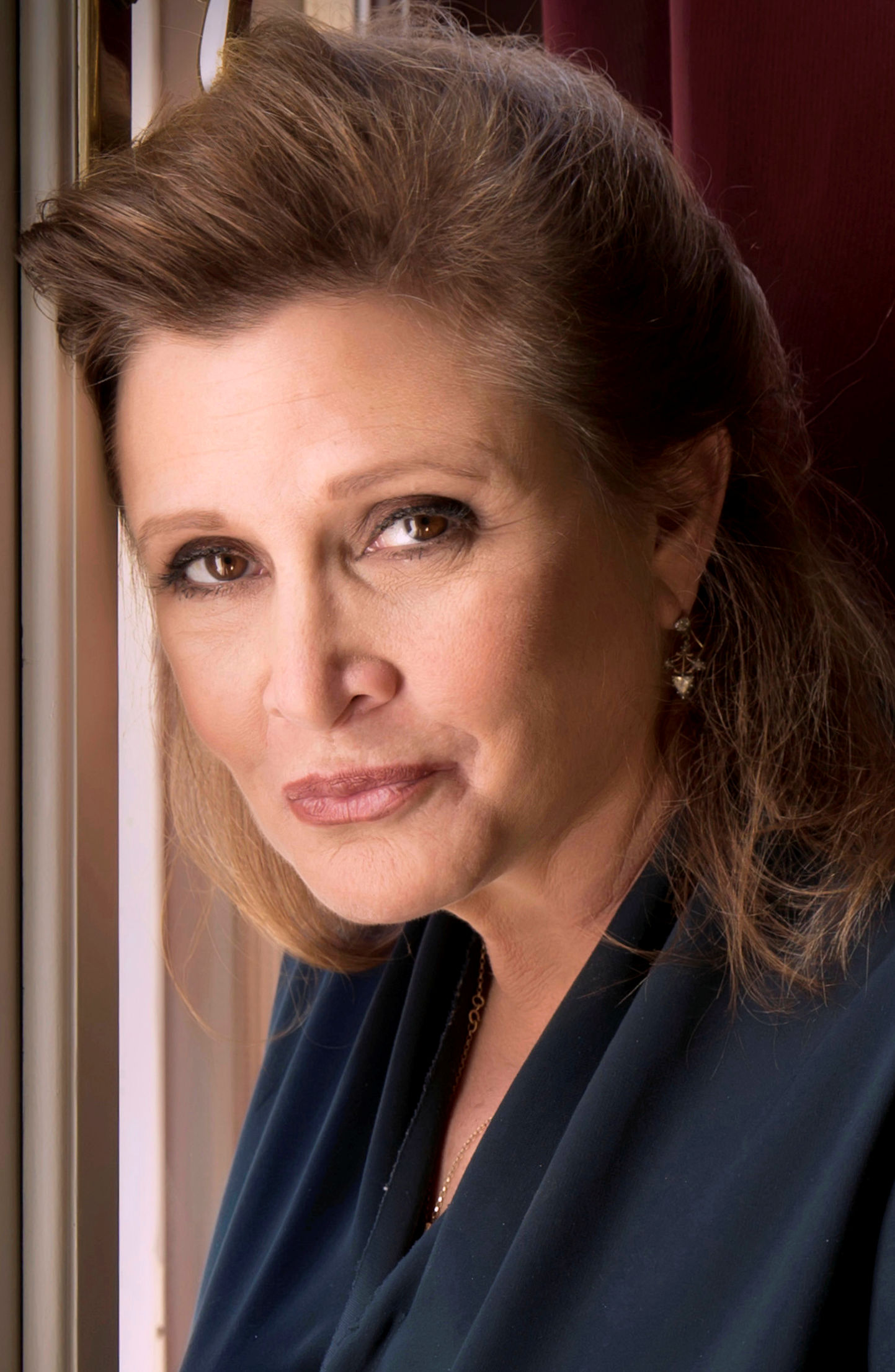
Carrie Fisher

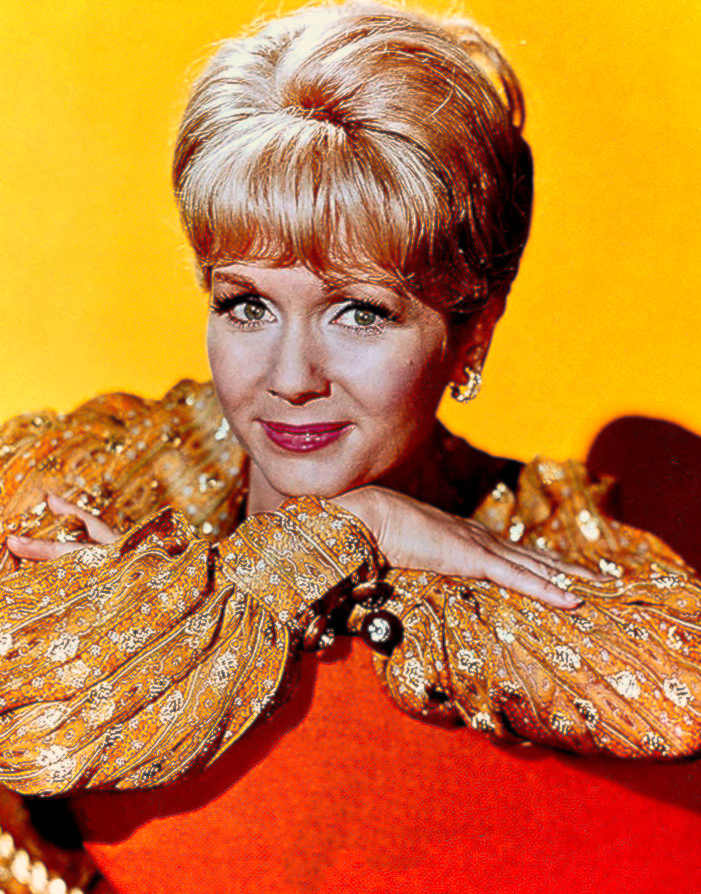
Debbie Reynolds

- December 1
  - Don Calfa, actor (born 1939)
  - Elisabeth Carron, operatic soprano (born 1922)
  - Joe McKnight, football player (born 1988)
- December 2
  - Lyle Bouck, U.S. Army officer (born 1923)
  - H. Keith H. Brodie, psychiatrist and educator (born 1939)
  - Billy Chapin, child actor (born 1943)
  - Mark Gray, country singer (born 1952)
  - Sammy Lee, Olympic diver (born 1920)
  - Bosco Tjan, psychologist and neuroscientist (born 1966)
- December 3
  - Newman Darby, inventor (born 1928)
  - Herbert Hardesty, jazz musician (born 1925)
  - Nancy Mairs, author (born 1943)
- December 4
  - Leonard T. Connors, politician (born 1929)
  - Jack Rudin, real estate developer (born 1924)
  - Margaret Whitton, actress (born 1950)
- December 5
  - Big Syke, rapper (born 1968)
  - Larry Roberts, football player (born 1963)
  - Rashaan Salaam, football player (born 1974)
  - Rodney Smith, photographer (born 1947)
- December 6 – Dave Edwards, football player (born 1939)
- December 7
  - Mike Kelly, politician (born 1942)
  - Elliott Schwartz, composer (born 1936)
- December 8
  - Putsy Caballero, baseball player (born 1927)
  - John Glenn, aviator, astronaut, and U.S. Senator (born 1921)
  - Joseph Mascolo, actor (born 1929)
  - Thomas C. Oden, theologian (born 1931)
- December 9
  - Edwin Benson, last native speaker of the Mandan language (born 1931)
  - Nola Ochs, centenarian (born 1911)
  - Jens Risom, Danish-born furniture designer (born 1916)
- December 10
  - Ken Hechler, politician (born 1914)
  - Eric Hilton, hotelier and philanthropist (born 1933)
  - Miles Lord, federal judge (born 1919)
- December 11
  - Sark Arslanian, football coach (born 1924)
  - Harry Jones, football player (born 1945)
  - Bob Krasnow, music industry executive (born 1935)
- December 12
  - Barrelhouse Chuck, blues musician (born 1958)
  - Myron H. Bright, federal judge (born 1919)
  - Donald L. Corbin, judge and politician (born 1938)
  - Jimbo Elrod, football player (born 1954)
  - Shirley Hazzard, Australian-born author (born 1931)
  - Jim Lowe, singer and songwriter (born 1923)
  - Konrad Reuland, football player (born 1987)
  - Esther Wilkins, dentist (born 1916)
- December 13
  - Lawrence Colburn, U.S. Army soldier (born 1949)
  - Roy Harrover, architect (born 1928)
  - Ralph Raico, historian (born 1936)
  - Thomas Schelling, economist (born 1921)
  - Alan Thicke, Canadian actor, songwriter, comedian, game and talk show host (b. 1947)
- December 14
  - Bernard Fox, Welsh-born actor (born 1927)
  - Garrett K. Gomez, jockey (born 1972)
  - Karel Husa, Czech-born composer and conductor (born 1921)
- December 15
  - Chuck Allen, football player (born 1939)
  - Howard Bingham, photographer (born 1939)
  - Fran Jeffries, actress and singer (born 1937)
  - Craig Sager, sportscaster (born 1951)
- December 17
  - Benjamin A. Gilman, politician (born 1922)
  - Louis Harris, journalist, author, and opinion polling entrepreneur (born 1921)
  - Henry Heimlich, thoracic surgeon (born 1920)
  - William H. Hudnut III, politician (born 1932)
- December 18
  - Brendan J. Dugan, banker and college administrator (born 1947)
  - Zsa Zsa Gabor, Hungarian-born actress and socialite (born 1917)
  - Sonny Moran, basketball coach (born 1926)
- December 19
  - Phil Gagliano, baseball player (born 1941)
  - Dick Latessa, actor (born 1929)
- December 20
  - Lawrence Borst, veterinarian and politician (born 1927)
  - Robert Eddins, football player (born 1988)
  - Toby Hemenway, educator and author (born 1952)
- December 21
  - Sidney Drell, physicist (born 1926)
  - Weston Noble, music conductor and educator (born 1922)
- December 22
  - Andre Martel, businessman and politician (born 1946)
  - Kenneth Snelson, sculptor and photographer (born 1927)
  - Lillian Walker, politician (born 1923)
- December 23
  - Joyce Appleby, historian (born 1929)
  - Willa Kim, costume designer (born 1917)
  - Jim Lehew, baseball player (born 1937)
- December 24
  - John Barfield, baseball player (born 1964)
  - Joseph Fitzmyer, Roman Catholic priest and biblical scholar (born 1920)
  - Edwin Reinecke, politician (born 1924)
  - Bronson Thayer, banker (born 1939)
- December 25
  - Alphonse Mouzon, jazz drummer (born 1948)
  - Vera Rubin, astronomer (born 1928)
- December 26
  - John J. Benoit, law enforcement officer and politician (born 1951)
  - Duck Edwing, cartoonist (born 1934)
  - Frances Gabe, inventor and centenarian (b. 1915)
  - Ricky Harris, comedian, actor, and film producer (born 1965)
  - George S. Irving, actor (born 1922)
  - Seth J. McKee, U.S. Air Force general (born 1916)
- December 27
  - Chrissy Adams, attorney (born 1967)
  - Bruce DeHaven, football coach (born 1948)
  - Carrie Fisher, actress and writer (born 1956)
  - George A. Russell, university president (born 1921)
  - Barbara Tarbuck, actress (born 1942)
- December 28
  - Bruce D. Porter, Mormon missionary and elder (born 1952)
  - Debbie Reynolds, actress, singer and dancer (born 1932)
  - Bernard Zaslav, classical violist (born 1926)
- December 29
  - Chris Cannizzaro, baseball player (born 1938)
  - Laurie Carlos, playwright, theatre director, and performance artist (born 1949)
  - Keion Carpenter, football player (born 1977)
  - Arthur H. Cash, historian and biographer (born 1922)
  - LaVell Edwards, football coach (born 1930)
  - Balozi Harvey, community activist (born 1940)
- December 30
  - Cara Rafaela, thoroughbred racehorse (born 1993)
  - Sutter Brown, Pembroke Welsh corgi (born 2003)
  - Rich Conaty, radio personality (born 1954)
  - Glen L. Rudd, Mormon missionary and elder (born 1918)
  - Huston Smith, religious scholar and philosopher (born 1919)
  - Matt Snorton, football player (born 1942)
  - Tyrus Wong, Chinese-born artist (born 1910)
- December 31
  - William Christopher, actor (born 1932)
  - David Meltzer, poet and musician (born 1937)

== See also ==
- 2016 in American music
- 2016 in American soccer
- 2016 in American television
- List of American films of 2016
- Timeline of United States history (2010–present)
