= Deaths in August 2016 =

The following is a list of notable deaths in August 2016.

Entries for each day are listed alphabetically by surname. A typical entry lists information in the following sequence:

- Name, age, country of citizenship and reason for notability, established cause of death, reference.

== August 2016 ==
=== 1 ===
- Queen Anne of Romania, 92, French-born Romanian royal.
- Frank Blas, 75, Guamanian politician, Lieutenant Governor (1987–1995), cancer.
- Peter Paul Brennan, 75, American Old Catholic prelate, Archbishop of New York.
- Donald J. Butz, 83, American major general.
- Óscar Celli Gerbasi, 70, Venezuelan politician, Governor of Carabobo (1985–1989).
- Alfred Dennis, 93, American actor (The Jerk, The Shootist, Get Shorty).
- Dai Dower, 83, Welsh Olympic flyweight boxer (1952) and European champion (1955).
- Trayan Dyankov, 40, Bulgarian football player and manager (FC Spartak Varna).
- Andre Hajdu, 84, Hungarian-born Israeli composer and educator (Tel Aviv University, Bar-Ilan University).
- Mike Howell, 73, American football player (Cleveland Browns, Miami Dolphins).
- Yabezi Kiiza, 78, Ugandan politician, Prime Minister of Bunyoro (2009–2012).
- Jonathan D. Krane, 65, American film producer (Face/Off, Look Who's Talking, Michael).
- Harrie Langman, 85, Dutch politician, Minister of Economic Affairs (1971–1973).
- Elaine Ling, 69, Hong Kong-born Canadian photographer, lung cancer.
- Louis Marriott, 81, Jamaican actor, director, writer and broadcaster.
- Jennifer Moyle, 95, British biochemist.
- Jim Northrup, 73, American Ojibwe writer, kidney cancer.
- Raimundo Ongaro, 91, Argentine union leader (CGTA).
- Allen K. Ono, 82, American army lieutenant general.
- Aydin Onur, 81, Turkish Olympic sprinter.
- Sir Derek Oulton, 89, British civil servant, Permanent Secretary of the Lord Chancellor's Department and Clerk of the Crown in Chancery (1982–1989).
- Michel Prévost, 90, French Olympic sport shooter.
- Muneo Tokunaga, 71, Japanese Indologist.
- George Brigars Williams, 87, Ghanaian actor.

=== 2 ===
- Terence Bayler, 86, New Zealand actor (Monty Python's Life of Brian, Time Bandits, Harry Potter and the Philosopher's Stone).
- Jonathan Borwein, 65, Scottish mathematician.
- Tony Chater, 86, British newspaper editor and communist activist.
- Forbes Carlile, 95, Australian swimming coach and modern pentathlete.
- Gordon Danby, 86, American physicist and inventor.
- John Fox, 87, English cricketer.
- James Martin Hayes, 92, Canadian Roman Catholic prelate, Archbishop of Halifax (1967–1990).
- David Huddleston, 85, American actor (The Big Lebowski, Blazing Saddles, Santa Claus: The Movie), heart and kidney disease.
- Gert Kölli, 76, Austrian Olympian
- René Landry, 79, Canadian politician.
- Robert Mabro, 81, Egyptian economist.
- Franciszek Macharski, 89, Polish Roman Catholic cardinal, Archbishop of Kraków (1979–2005).
- Juan Carlos Mesa, 86, Argentine humorist.
- Álvaro Pérez Intriago, 79, Ecuadorian politician, member of the National Congress (1984–1986, 1996–2002), Mayor of Quito (1978–1982).
- Greg Stemrick, 64, American football player (Houston Oilers), heart attack.
- Neil Wilkinson, 61, English footballer (Blackburn Rovers, Port Vale, Crewe Alexandra).
- Ahmed Zewail, 70, Egyptian-American scientist, laureate of the Nobel Prize in Chemistry (1999).

=== 3 ===
- Shahram Amiri, 38, Iranian nuclear scientist, execution by hanging.
- Chris Amon, 73, New Zealand motor racing driver, cancer.
- Mansueto Bianchi, 66, Italian Roman Catholic prelate, Bishop of Volterra (2000–2006) and Pistoia (2006–2014).
- Elizabeth Colson, 99, American social anthropologist.
- Russell Coughlin, 56, Welsh footballer (Carlisle, Plymouth, Swansea), traffic collision.
- Louis Herman, 86, American marine biologist, bile duct cancer.
- Mel Hurtig, 84, Canadian publisher and political activist, pneumonia.
- Abdul Jeelani, 62, American basketball player (Portland Trail Blazers, Dallas Mavericks).
- Blake Krikorian, 48, American businessman and entrepreneur, founder of Slingbox, heart attack.
- Steve LaTourette, 62, American politician, member of the U.S. House of Representatives for Ohio's 14th district (1995–2013), pancreatic cancer.
- Ricci Martin, 62, American musician.
- Shakira Martin, 30, American-born Jamaican model and beauty queen, Miss Jamaica Universe (2011), sickle-cell disease.
- Robert Rosencrans, 89, American businessman, chairman of C-SPAN.
- Irving Sablosky, 92, American diplomat.
- Elliot Tiber, 81, American artist and writer (Taking Woodstock: A True Story of a Riot, a Concert and a Life), stroke.

=== 4 ===
- Jean Antone, 73, American professional wrestler (AWA, AJW, CSW).
- Eugene Atkinson, 89, American politician, member of the United States House of Representatives from Pennsylvania's 25th congressional district (1979–1983).
- Bruce Burrell, 63, Australian murderer, liver and lung cancer.
- Peggy Cramer, 79, American baseball player (AAGPBL).
- David Dudley Dowd Jr., 87, American federal judge, member of the U.S. District Court for the Northern District of Ohio (1982–1996).
- Saeed Madibo, Sudanese politician.
- Patrice Munsel, 91, American coloratura soprano.
- Albert Nicholas, 85, American businessman and philanthropist.
- Robert Ramsay, 42, American baseball player (Seattle Mariners), seizure.
- Snaffu Rigor, 69, Filipino singer and songwriter, lung cancer.
- Craven C. Rogers Jr., 81, American air force lieutenant general.
- Gaspar Saladino, 88, American comic book letterer (Superman vs. Muhammad Ali, Arkham Asylum).
- Zinaida Sharko, 87, Russian stage actress.
- Likas Tarigan, 92, Indonesian politician, member of the People's Consultative Assembly (1978–1988).
- Charles Toubé, 58, Cameroonian footballer (Tonnerre Yaoundé, national team).
- Ducksy Walsh, 50, Irish handball player.

=== 5 ===
- Hans-Jürgen Appelrath, 64, German educator (University of Oldenburg).
- David Attwooll, 67, British poet and publisher, Erdheim–Chester disease.
- Shamim Ara, 78, Pakistani actress and director.
- Alan Bates, 71, American physician and politician, member of the Oregon House of Representatives (2001–2005) and Senate (since 2005).
- Mahim Bora, 92, Indian writer, brain haemorrhage.
- Leslie Brown, 61, American historian, leukemia.
- Sir Robin Chichester-Clark, 88, British politician, MP for Londonderry (1955–1974).
- Joe Davis, 75, Scottish footballer (Hibernian, Carlisle United).
- Don Donnithorne, 90, New Zealand architect.
- Joellyn Duesberry, 72, American landscape artist, pancreatic cancer.
- Alphons Egli, 91, Swiss politician, member of the Federal Council (1983–1989).
- Richard Fagan, 69, American songwriter and musician, liver cancer.
- Harold Hillman, 85, British scientist, heart failure.
- Eleuterio Fernández Huidobro, 74, Uruguayan politician, Minister of Defence (since 2011), respiratory problems.
- Vander Lee, 50, Brazilian singer-songwriter.
- Leovigildo López Fitoria, 89, Nicaraguan Roman Catholic prelate, Bishop of Granada (1972–2003).
- Ines Mandl, 98, Austrian-born American biochemist.
- George E. Mendenhall, 99, American Biblical scholar.
- Annet Nieuwenhuyzen, 85, Dutch actress.
- Sir Leonard Peach, 83, British civil servant, Chief Executive of the National Health Service (1986–1989).
- Stuart D. B. Picken, 74, Scottish philosopher, academic, and cleric.
- Erling Ree-Pedersen, 94, Norwegian civil servant, Director of Tax Administration (1976–1982).
- Salvador Q. Quizon, 91, Filipino Roman Catholic prelate, Auxiliary Bishop of Lipa (1979–2002).
- John Alan Robinson, 86, British philosopher, mathematician and computer scientist.
- Howard Kapnek Schachman, 97, American biochemist, pneumonia.

=== 6 ===
- Mattie Adams, 92, American interior designer.
- Guillermo Anderson, 54, Honduran singer, thyroid cancer.
- Sid Applebaum, 92, American businessman, co-founder of Rainbow Foods.
- José Becerra, 80, Mexican bantamweight boxer, world champion (1959–1960).
- Philip Bialowitz, 90, Polish Holocaust survivor and resistance fighter.
- Chow Lien-hwa, 96, Chinese Baptist minister and theologian.
- Helen Delich Bentley, 92, American politician, member of the U.S. House of Representatives for Maryland's 2nd district (1985–1995), brain cancer.
- Joani Blank, 79, American entrepreneur (Good Vibrations), Butterfly vibrator inventor, author and feminist sex educator.
- Alfredo Bowman, 82, Honduran herbalist.
- Art Demmas, 83, American football official.
- Alan Dossor, 74, British theatre director.
- Kenneth Durham, 62, British educationalist, headmaster of University College School.
- Midget Farrelly, 71, Australian surfer, world champion (1965), stomach cancer.
- Pete Fountain, 86, American clarinetist.
- Sally Katary, 69, Canadian Egyptologist.
- Ercole Lupinacci, 82, Italian Catholic hierarch, Bishop of Lungro (1987–2010).
- Temple Painter, 83, American harpsichordist and organist.
- Ivo Pitanguy, 93, Brazilian plastic surgeon.
- Brian Roberts, 71, Australian footballer (Richmond).
- Mel Slack, 72, English footballer (Southend United, Cambridge United).
- Samuel Robin Spark, 78, Scottish artist.
- Vietnam Veedu Sundaram, 76, Indian screenwriter and film director.
- Jacques Terzian, 94, American sculptor and furniture designer.
- Norman Twain, 85, American stage and film producer (Lean on Me, Bajour, My Dog Tulip).
- Michael Walter, 57, German Olympic luger (1984, 1988), world champion (1985).
- Don Welch, 84, American poet and academic.
- Jan Wilsgaard, 86, Norwegian-born Swedish automobile designer (Volvo).
- Walter C. Young, 91, American politician, member of the Florida House of Representatives (1972–1992).

=== 7 ===
- Pierre Bangoura, 77–78, Guinean footballer.
- David M. Borden, 79, American jurist, Justice of the Connecticut Supreme Court (1990–2007), pancreatic cancer.
- John Boreland, 46, Northern Irish loyalist activist, shot.
- Yuri Bregel, 90, Russian historian.
- Larry Brink, 92, American football player (Los Angeles Rams).
- Alfonso Bruno, 82, Venezuelan Olympic sprinter.
- Gustavo Bueno, 91, Spanish philosopher.
- Rodolfo Camacho, 40, Colombian-born Venezuelan cyclist, shot.
- Bryan Clauson, 27, American racing driver, race collision.
- Mito Croes, 70, Aruban politician.
- Joe Duplin, 82, American sailor, world champion (1963).
- H. F. Gierke III, 73, American judge.
- Jack Günthard, 96, Swiss gymnast, Olympic champion (1952).
- Anđelko Klobučar, 85, Croatian composer and organist.
- Sagan Lewis, 62, American actress (St. Elsewhere, Homicide: Life on the Street), cancer.
- Hans Ragnemalm, 76, Swedish judge and academic.
- Sir Ron Scott, 88, New Zealand sports administrator.
- Jack Sears, 86, British race and rally driver.
- Peter Stein, 91, British legal scholar.
- Roy Summersby, 81, English footballer (Crystal Palace, Millwall, Portsmouth).
- B. E. Taylor, 65, American musician ("Vitamin L"), brain cancer.
- Ivo Urbančič, 85, Slovenian philosopher.
- Janus van der Zande, 91, Dutch Olympic marathon runner (1952).
- Dolores Vargas, 80, Spanish singer, complications of leukemia.
- Ruby Winters, 74, American soul singer ("Make Love to Me", "I Will").

=== 8 ===
- M. Bernard Aidinoff, 87, American tax lawyer.
- Nikola Anastasov, 84, Bulgarian actor.
- Ali Baba, 76, Pakistani writer.
- Mikhail Bariban, 67, Russian Olympic triple jumper (1972).
- Doris Bohrer, 93, American intelligence operative.
- Mike Brumley, 78, American baseball player (Washington Senators).
- Makandal Daaga, 80, Trinidadian political activist.
- Edward Daly, 82, Northern Irish Roman Catholic prelate, Bishop of Derry (1974–1993).
- Željko Kopanja, 61, Bosnian newspaper editor, heart attack.
- Jyothi Lakshmi, 63, Indian actress, leukemia.
- Vijaya Nandasiri, 72, Sri Lankan actor and dramatist.
- Lin Shllaku, 78, Albanian footballer (Partizani Tirana, national team), lung disease.
- Klaus Weber, 80, German biologist.
- George Yarno, 58, American football player (Tampa Bay Buccaneers, Atlanta Falcons, Houston Oilers), stomach cancer.

=== 9 ===
- Bill Alsup, 78, American race car driver, crane accident.
- Panchu Arunachalam, 76, Indian film writer (Kazhugu, Paayum Puli) and director (Manamagale Vaa), cardiac arrest.
- Miguel José Asurmendi Aramendía, 76, Spanish Roman Catholic prelate, Bishop of Tarazona (1990–1995) and Vitoria (1995–2016).
- Susan Baer, 65, American transportation executive, cancer.
- Karl Bögelein, 89, German football player and coach (VfB Stuttgart).
- Barendra Krushna Dhal, 77, Indian journalist.
- Bill Dooley, 82, American football coach (North Carolina Tar Heels, Virginia Tech Hokies, Wake Forest Demon Deacons).
- Robert Finch, 86, American yacht designer, brain hemorrhage.
- Gerald Grosvenor, 6th Duke of Westminster, 64, British billionaire property developer, heart attack.
- Fabio Garriba, 71, Italian actor (Slap the Monster on Page One).
- Siegbert Horn, 66, German slalom canoeist, Olympic champion (1972).
- Barry Jenner, 75, American actor (Star Trek: Deep Space Nine, Dallas, Family Matters), acute myeloid leukemia.
- Aftab Ghulam Nabi Kazi, 96, Pakistani politician, Governor of the State Bank of Pakistan (1978–1986).
- Bob Kiley, 80, American public transport planner, Alzheimer's disease.
- Jimmy Levine, 61–62, American R&B musician and record producer.
- Jimmy D. Long, 84, American politician, member of the Louisiana State Legislature (1968–2000), traffic collision.
- W. Carter Merbreier, 90, American television personality (Captain Noah and His Magical Ark).
- Ernst Neizvestny, 91, Russian-American sculptor.
- Fred Opert, 77, American racing driver and car dealer.
- Kalikho Pul, 47, Indian politician, Chief Minister of Arunachal Pradesh (2016) and MLA for Hayuliang (since 1995), suicide by hanging.
- Philippe Roberts-Jones, 91, Belgian art historian.
- Wang Tuoh, 72, Taiwanese writer and politician, MLY for Keelung (1996–2008), complications of a heart attack.
- Nathaniel Williams, Liberian politician.

=== 10 ===
- Neill Armstrong, 90, American football player (Philadelphia Eagles) and coach (Edmonton Eskimos, Chicago Bears).
- John Bennett, 84, Irish hurler (Cork).
- Des Calverley, 96, Australian football player (Fitzroy, Richmond).
- Lovell Coleman, 78, American-born Canadian football player (Calgary Stampeders).
- C. Welborn Daniel, 90, American politician and judge.
- Walter Hollenweger, 89, Swiss theologian and author.
- Donald Lee, 83, South African cricketer.
- Ralph Mason, 77, English singer.
- John H. Moore, 77, American anthropologist.
- Kenneth Osterberger, 86, American politician, member of the Louisiana Senate (1972–1992).
- Harold Peterman, 74, American politician, member of the Delaware House of Representatives (since 2011).
- Steve Pivovar, 63, American sports journalist (Omaha World-Herald).
- John Saunders, 61, Canadian-born American sports journalist (ESPN, The Sports Reporters) and broadcaster (ESPN on ABC).
- Sasi Shanker, 57, Indian film director (Kunjikoonan).
- Cynthia Szigeti, 66, American actress (National Lampoon's European Vacation, Seinfeld, Curb Your Enthusiasm), idiopathic pulmonary fibrosis.
- James J. Tietjen, 83, American scientist and businessman.
- Ideler Tonelli, 91, Argentine politician.
- Gerhard Tötschinger, 70, Austrian actor, pulmonary embolism.
- Tom Wilson, 72, American football player and coach (Texas A&M Aggies), cancer.

=== 11 ===
- Hamdi Al Banbi, 80, Egyptian businessman and politician, Petroleum Minister (1991–1999).
- Roly Bain, 62, English priest and clown.
- Charles Bawden, 92, British Mongolist.
- Leon Donohue, 77, American football player (San Francisco 49ers, Dallas Cowboys).
- James B. Dunn, 89, American politician, member of the South Dakota Senate (1973–2000).
- Joel Fallon, 85, American poet, cancer.
- Elmo Fernando, 75, Sri Lankan broadcaster.
- Paul Friedrich, 88, American anthropologist and linguist.
- Hanif Mohammad, 81, Pakistani cricketer (national team).
- Sigbjørn Ravnåsen, 74, Norwegian politician.
- Francesco Sgalambro, 82, Italian Roman Catholic prelate, Bishop of Cefalù (2000–2009).
- Alan G. Sharp, 86, American major general.
- Len Steckler, 88, American photographer, illustrator and filmmaker.
- Thomas Steinbeck, 72, American writer and war photographer, chronic obstructive pulmonary disease.
- Sir Ian Turbott, 94, New Zealand diplomat, Administrator of Antigua (1958–1964) and Grenada (1964–1967).
- Glenn Yarbrough, 86, American folk singer ("Baby the Rain Must Fall", "It's Gonna Be Fine", "San Francisco Bay Blues").

=== 12 ===
- Keith Blunt, 77, English football coach (Sutton United, Malmö, Viking), cancer.
- Paul Kraabel, 83, American politician, member of the Washington House of Representatives (1971–1975), subdural hematoma.
- Juan Pedro de Miguel, 58, Spanish Olympic handball player (1980, 1984).
- Gonzalo Monte-Manibog, 86, Filipino Olympic wrestler.
- Dick Pappenheim, 87, Dutch Olympic alpine skier.
- Alison Piepmeier, 43, American writer, brain cancer.
- Ljubomir Popović, 81, Serbian painter.
- Halambage Premasiri, 52, Sri Lankan cricket player and administrator.
- Lou Rankin, 87, American sculptor.
- F. William Summers, 83, American librarian and educator.
- Sir Swinton Thomas, 85, British judge.
- Ruby Wilson, 68, American blues, soul and gospel singer, heart attack.

=== 13 ===
- Kenny Baker, 81, British actor (Star Wars, Time Bandits, Flash Gordon).
- Ettore Bernabei, 95, Italian television director and producer.
- Miguel Bortolini, 74, Mexican politician, cancer.
- Connie Crothers, 75, American jazz pianist, cancer.
- William E. Dunn, 90, American politician.
- Patricia English, 84, British actress (The Avengers).
- Pete Finney, 88, American sportswriter.
- Gita Hall, 82, Swedish-American actress (The Gun Runners).
- Allen Kelley, 83, American basketball player, Olympic champion (1960).
- Pramukh Swami Maharaj, 94, Indian religious leader.
- Françoise Mallet-Joris, 86, Belgian writer.
- Emidio Massi, 94, Italian politician, President of Marche (1978–1990).
- Jan Mielniczak, 61, Polish Olympic field hockey player.
- S. P. Sarguna Pandian, 75, Indian politician.
- Michel Richard, 68, French-born American chef, complications from a stroke.
- Adi Sasono, 73, Indonesian politician, Minister of Cooperatives and Small Businesses (1998–1999).
- Joyce Carol Thomas, 78, American poet, playwright, motivational speaker, and author.
- Liam Tuohy, 83, Irish football player and manager (Shamrock Rovers, Newcastle United, national team).
- Holger Ursin, 82, Norwegian physician.

=== 14 ===
- Marion Christopher Barry, 36, American construction company owner, drug overdose.
- Bi Chunfang, 89, Chinese Yue opera performer.
- Neil Black, 84, English oboist.
- María Julia Castillo Rodas, 81, Salvadoran surgeon and politician, President of the Legislative Assembly of El Salvador (1982–1985).
- Raphael Cheenath, 81, Indian Roman Catholic prelate, Archbishop of Cuttack-Bhubaneswar (1985–2011).
- Paddy Deagan, 85, Australian rules footballer (South Melbourne).
- DJ Official, 39, American hip hop musician, bone marrow cancer.
- Fyvush Finkel, 93, American actor (Picket Fences, Boston Public, A Serious Man), Emmy winner (1994).
- Christodoulos Floudas, 56, Greek-born American chemical engineer, heart attack.
- Clive Follmer, 84, American basketball player.
- Robert Goff, Baron Goff of Chieveley, 89, British judge and law lord.
- Aboud Jumbe, 96, Tanzanian politician, President of Zanzibar (1972–1984).
- Hermann Kant, 90, German writer.
- Ron Vander Kelen, 76, American football player (Minnesota Vikings, Wisconsin Badgers), MVP of the 1963 Rose Bowl.
- Horst Meyer, 90, Swiss physicist.
- Ken Meyer, 91, American football coach (San Francisco 49ers).
- Na. Muthukumar, 41, Indian lyricist, jaundice.
- Edgar Peltenburg, 74, Canadian archaeologist.
- Lorenzo Piani, 60, Italian singer and songwriter.
- Sohail Qaiser, 51, Pakistani squash player, world champion (1985), cancer.
- Yasumitsu Toyoda, 81, Japanese baseball player (Saitama Seibu Lions, Tokyo Yakult Swallows), pneumonia.
- James Woolley, 49, American keyboardist (Nine Inch Nails, 2wo), Grammy winner (1993), injuries from a fall.

=== 15 ===
- Hotaru Akane, 32, Japanese pornographic actress.
- Dennis Akumu, 82, Kenyan politician, MP for Nyakach (1969–1973, 1992–1997).
- Dick Assman, 82, Canadian gas station manager.
- Dalian Atkinson, 48, English footballer (Ipswich Town, Aston Villa), tased.
- Mauril Bélanger, 61, Canadian politician, MP for Ottawa—Vanier (since 1995), amyotrophic lateral sclerosis.
- William R. Beyer, 93, American pilot.
- Choo-Choo Coleman, 78, American baseball player (New York Mets, Philadelphia Phillies), cancer.
- Sarath de Abrew, 63, Sri Lankan judge.
- Richard DeWall, 89, American cardiothoracic surgeon.
- Solange Fasquelle, 83, French writer.
- Stefan Henze, 35, German canoeist and coach, Olympic silver medalist (2004), traffic collision.
- Joseph Hone, 79, Irish spy writer.
- Bobby Hutcherson, 75, American jazz musician, emphysema.
- Harold Kalina, 88, American politician.
- Alison Kelly, 102, English art historian.
- Bob Kindred, 76, American jazz saxophonist.
- Monique Koeyers-Felida, 49, Curaçaoan politician, member of the Estates of Curaçao (2010–2015).
- André Lacroix, 94, French Olympic modern pentathlete.
- T. A. Razzaq, 58, Indian screenwriter (Perumazhakkalam).
- Bambi Sheleg, 58, Chilean-born Israeli journalist and magazine editor, cancer.
- Makhenkesi Stofile, 71, South African politician and diplomat, Premier of the Eastern Cape (1997–2004), Minister of Sport and Recreation (2004–2010), Ambassador to Germany (since 2011).
- Richard Wackar, 88, American football and basketball coach (Rowan Profs).

=== 16 ===
- Jean-Guy Allard, 68, Canadian journalist and author.
- Bev Barnes, 65, Canadian Olympic basketball player.
- Fred Barry, 68, American football player (Pittsburgh Steelers).
- Andrew Florent, 45, Australian tennis player, colorectal cancer.
- Jorge García Isaza, 88, Colombian Roman Catholic prelate, Vicar Apostolic of Tierradentro (1989–2003).
- Charti Lal Goel, 89, Indian politician.
- João Havelange, 100, Brazilian football executive, President of FIFA (1974–1998).
- John McLaughlin, 89, American political commentator and television personality (The McLaughlin Group).
- Jemma Redmond, 38, Irish biotechnologist.
- Ksenya Ponomaryova, 54, Russian editor and media manager, throat cancer.
- Luis Álvaro de Oliveira Ribeiro, 73, Brazilian businessman, President of Santos FC (2010–2014).
- Richard Seminack, 74, American Ukrainian Catholic hierarch, Bishop of Saint Nicholas of Chicago (since 2003), cancer.
- Gurdial Singh, 83, Indian writer.
- Ken Thornett, 78, Australian rugby league player (Parramatta Eels, national team, Leeds).
- John Timoney, 68, Irish-born American police officer, chief of Miami Police Department (2003–2010), Commissioner of the Philadelphia Police Department (1998–2002), lung cancer.

=== 17 ===
- George Anthan, 80, American journalist, cardiac arrest.
- Steve Arlin, 70, American baseball player (San Diego Padres, Cleveland Indians).
- James R. Bennett, 76, American politician, Secretary of State of Alabama (1993–2003, 2013–2015), cancer.
- Thomas Cholmondeley, 48, Kenyan farmer and landowner, complications after surgery.
- Baby Dalupan, 92, Filipino basketball coach (Crispa, Great Taste, Purefoods), pneumonia.
- John Ellenby, 75, British computer scientist.
- John Fischer, 86, Belgian-born American pianist and composer, stroke.
- Katharine Blodgett Gebbie, 84, American astrophysicist.
- Benson Ginsburg, 98, American behavioral geneticist.
- Nachum Heiman, 82, Latvian-born Israeli composer, recipient of the Israel Prize (2009).
- Arthur Hiller, 92, Canadian-born American film director (Love Story, The Hospital, The In-Laws), President of AMPAS (1993–1997).
- Barry Hollowell, 68, Canadian Anglican prelate, Bishop of Calgary (1999–2005).
- William Landles, 92, Scottish sculptor.
- Jim Malmquist, 85, American football and ice hockey coach.
- Víctor Mora, 85, Spanish comic book writer.
- Barry Myers, 79, British advertising filmmaker.
- Mool Singh, 63, Indian politician, Madhya Pradesh MLA for Raghogarh (1985–1989, 2008–2013), heart attack.
- Renuka Sinha, 67, Indian politician, MP for Cooch Behar (since 2014), heart attack.
- Shelby Westbrook, 94, American World War II pilot (Tuskegee Airmen).

=== 18 ===
- René Bonino, 86, French Olympic sprinter (1952, 1956), silver medalist at 1954 European Championship.
- Rovshan Janiyev, 41, Azerbaijani-Russian criminal, shot.
- Machali, 20, Indian tigress.
- Maxon Mbendera, 57, Malawian judge and chairperson of the Malawi Electoral Commission.
- Jérôme Monod, 85, French political advisor.
- Michael Napier Brown, 79, British actor, theatre director and playwright.
- Ernst Nolte, 93, German historian.
- Jan van Cauwelaert, 102, Belgian-Congolese Roman Catholic prelate, Bishop of Inongo (1954–1967).
- John William Vessey Jr., 94, American military officer, Chairman of the Joint Chiefs of Staff (1982–1985).
- Esther Wertheimer, 89–90, Polish-born Canadian sculptor.

=== 19 ===
- Trevor Baker, 94, British meteorologist.
- Subrata Banerjee, 71, Indian cricket umpire.
- Judes Bicaba, 69, Burkinabe Roman Catholic prelate, Bishop of Dédougou (since 2005).
- Peter Blundell Jones, 67, British architect and architectural historian.
- Bob Cupp, 76, American golf course designer.
- Adrian Enescu, 68, Romanian composer.
- Jay S. Fishman, 63, American business executive, CEO of Travelers, amyotrophic lateral sclerosis.
- John T. Flack, 87, American politician.
- Donald Henderson, 87, American physician, smallpox eradication program director, broken hip complications.
- Marco de Hohenlohe-Langenburg, 54, Spanish nobleman.
- Éva Lindner, 90, Hungarian Olympic skater (1948).
- Edward T. Maloney, 88, American aviation historian.
- John Penn Mayberry, 77, American mathematical philosopher.
- Colin O'Brien, 76, British photographer.
- Lou Pearlman, 62, American record producer, music manager (Backstreet Boys, NSYNC) and convicted criminal, cardiac arrest.
- Nina Ponomaryova, 87, Russian discus thrower, Olympic champion (1952, 1960).
- Krzysztof Ptak, 62, Polish cinematographer (Pornografia).
- William T. Quillen, 81, American politician.
- Jack Riley, 80, American actor (The Bob Newhart Show, Rugrats, Spaceballs), pneumonia.
- Horacio Salgán, 100, Argentine tango musician.
- Mohammad Ali Samatar, 81, Somali politician, Prime Minister (1987–1990).
- Bob Skelton, 81, New Zealand jockey, bowel cancer.
- Danus Skene, 72, Scottish politician.
- Derek Smith, 85, British jazz pianist.
- Mira Stupica, 93, Serbian actress (Parada).

=== 20 ===
- Sam Bawlf, 72, Canadian politician and author, MLA (1976–1979).
- Judith-Marie Bergan, 67, American actress, cancer.
- Detlev Blanke, 75, German Esperantist.
- Lilia Cuntapay, 81, Filipino actress (Shake, Rattle & Roll, Brokedown Palace, Six Degrees of Separation from Lilia Cuntapay).
- George E. Curry, 69, American journalist, heart failure.
- Daniela Dessì, 59, Italian opera singer, cancer.
- Irving Fields, 101, American pianist.
- Jim Gibbons, 79, American football player (Detroit Lions), double pneumonia.
- Harry Gilmer, 90, American football player (Washington Redskins, Detroit Lions).
- Richard P. Korf, 91, American mycologist.
- Charles-Émile Loo, 94, French politician, member of the European Parliament (1979–1989) and the National Assembly (1967–1968, 1973–1978).
- Eugeniusz Geno Malkowski, 73, Polish artist.
- John J. McGlynn, 94, American politician.
- Ignacio Padilla, 47, Mexican writer, traffic collision.
- Joseph A. Palaia, 89, American politician, member of the New Jersey Senate (1989–2008).
- Richard Peaslee, 86, American composer.
- Luis Rodolfo Peñaherrera Bermeo, 80, Ecuadorian artist.
- Brian Rix, Baron Rix, 92, British actor (And the Same to You) and activist (Mencap).
- Morton Schindel, 98, American film producer.
- Louis Smith, 85, American jazz trumpeter.
- Louis Stewart, 72, Irish jazz guitarist.
- Percival Turnbull, 62, British archaeologist.
- Morris Wessel, 98, American pediatrician.
- M. K. Wren, 78, American science fiction writer.

=== 21 ===
- Headley Bennett, 85, Jamaican saxophonist.
- Nick Derbyshire, 73, British architect.
- Abd al-Rahman Fakhri, 79, Yemeni poet and literary critic.
- Basia Frydman, 70, Polish-born Swedish actress (The Slingshot).
- Peter deCourcy Hero, 73, American philanthropy consultant, esophageal cancer.
- Morihiko Hiramatsu, 92, Japanese politician, Governor of Ōita Prefecture (1979–2003).
- Karl Hischier, 91, Swiss Olympic cross-country skier (1952).
- Sir Antony Jay, 86, English broadcaster, director and writer (Yes Minister).
- Per Lønning, 88, Norwegian Lutheran bishop and politician, MP (1958–1965).
- Marin Moraru, 79, Romanian actor.
- Norma Moriceau, 72, Australian costume designer (Mad Max 2, Crocodile Dundee, Patriot Games).
- Mario Novelli, 76, Italian actor.
- Benet Rossell, 78, Spanish artist, amyotrophic lateral sclerosis.
- Guido Schmidt-Chiari, 84, Austrian banker (Creditanstalt).
- Rab Stewart, 54, Scottish footballer (Dunfermline Athletic, Motherwell, Falkirk).
- Hanako Tokachi, 70, Japanese actress.

=== 22 ===
- Farid Ali, 71, Bangladeshi actor.
- Michael Brooks, 58, American basketball player (La Salle, San Diego Clippers, Indiana Pacers), stroke.
- Jordi Carbonell, 92, Spanish politician, President of ERC (1996–2004).
- Jackson B. Davis, 98, American politician, member of the Louisiana State Legislature (1956–1980).
- Denise Favart, 92, French Olympic figure skater.
- Girolamo Grillo, 86, Italian Roman Catholic prelate, Bishop of Civitavecchia-Tarquinia (1983–2006).
- Paul Landreaux, 72, American college basketball coach (El Camino College, Saint Mary's)
- Michael Leader, 77, British actor (EastEnders, Star Wars, Doctor Who).
- Li Yinyuan, 97, Chinese physicist and academician (Chinese Academy of Sciences).
- Liu Dajun, 90, Chinese agricultural scientist, educator and academician (Chinese Academy of Engineering).
- Edward Malefakis, 84, American history professor.
- V. S. Mani, 74, Indian legal scholar.
- Don McIver, 80, New Zealand military officer, Chief of General Staff (1987–1989), director of the New Zealand Security Intelligence Service (1991–1999).
- S. R. Nathan, 92, Singaporean politician, President (1999–2011), stroke.
- Geneton Moraes Neto, 60, Brazilian writer and journalist, aortic aneurysm.
- Jacqueline Pagnol, 95, French actress (Topaze).
- Ramón Puig, 87, Cuban Olympic rower.
- Diana Quer, 18, Spanish murder victim.
- Charlie Sands, 68, American baseball player (Pittsburgh Pirates, California Angels).
- Willie Smith, 84, American football coach.
- Gilli Smyth, 83, English singer (Gong).
- Toots Thielemans, 94, Belgian jazz guitarist, whistler and harmonica player (Man Bites Harmonica!).
- Jane Thompson, 89, American designer and architect, cancer.

=== 23 ===
- Andreas Barkoulis, 80, Greek actor.
- Tekin Bilge, 85–86, Turkish Olympic footballer.
- Barry Chamish, 64, Canadian-born Israeli writer.
- Bryan Clutterbuck, 56, American baseball player (Milwaukee Brewers), colon cancer.
- Dennis Hackett, 87, British journalist and editor (Queen, Nova, Today).
- Mohammad Heydari, 79, Iranian musician and songwriter, cancer.
- Steven Hill, 94, American actor (Mission: Impossible, Law & Order, The Firm).
- Esther Jungreis, 80, Hungarian-born American religious leader, founder of Hineni, pneumonia.
- Alexander Malta, 77, Swiss operatic bass-baritone.
- William McAllister-Johnson, 77, Canadian academic.
- André Melançon, 74, Canadian film director.
- Berit Mørdre, 76, Norwegian cross-country skier, Olympic champion (1968).
- Evita Muñoz, 79, Mexican actress, pneumonia.
- Jeremiah Joseph O'Keefe, 93, American World War II pilot ace and politician, mayor of Biloxi, Mississippi (1973–1981).
- Gerald J. Oppenheimer, 94, American librarian and academic.
- Tony Pasquesi, 83, American football player (Chicago Cardinals).
- Joseph Chilton Pearce, 90, American author.
- Aaron W. Plyler, 89, American politician.
- Mercedes Pulido, 78, Venezuelan politician and diplomat.
- Max Ritvo, 25, American poet, Ewing sarcoma.
- Edgar Schoen, 91, American physician.
- Reinhard Selten, 85, German economist, winner of the Nobel Memorial Prize in Economic Sciences (1994).
- Henri de Turenne, 94, French journalist and screenwriter.
- Ria Vedder-Wubben, 65, Dutch politician, member of the Senate (2003–2011).
- Elsie Wayne, 84, Canadian politician, MP from Saint John (1993–2004).
- Antônio Eliseu Zuqueto, 86, Brazilian Roman Catholic prelate, Bishop of Teixeira de Freitas-Caravelas (1983–2005).

=== 24 ===
- Roy Baldwin, 89, Australian rules footballer (Hawthorn).
- Juan Bell, 48, Dominican baseball player (Baltimore Orioles, Philadelphia Phillies, Milwaukee Brewers), kidney illness.
- Reed Benson, 88, American academic.
- Joel Bergman, 80, American architect (The Mirage).
- Neil Berry, 94, American baseball player (Detroit Tigers, St. Louis Browns).
- Michel Butor, 89, French writer.
- Glen Evans, 80, New Zealand politician.
- Gilles-Gaston Granger, 96, French analytic philosopher.
- Glen Grout, 64, Canadian Olympic diver.
- Laurence Higgins, 87, American Roman Catholic priest.
- George Kaczender, 83, Hungarian-born Canadian film director (In Praise of Older Women).
- Akhlaqur Rahman Kidwai, 96, Indian politician, Governor of Haryana (2004–2009), Rajasthan (2007), West Bengal (1998–1999), and Bihar (1979–1985, 1993–1998).
- Shūgorō Nakazato, 96, Japanese martial artist, aspiration pneumonia.
- Walter Scheel, 97, German politician, President of West Germany (1974–1979), Minister for Foreign Affairs (1969–1974) and Vice-Chancellor (1969–1974).
- Gregory P. Schmidt, 69, American politician, cancer.
- Józef Szymański, 90, Polish Olympic bobsledder.
- Roger Y. Tsien, 64, American biochemist, Nobel Prize laureate (2008).
- Miguel Varela, 76, Filipino businessman.
- Henning Voscherau, 75, German politician, Mayor of Hamburg (1988–1997), brain tumor.
- Nina Yeryomina, 82, Russian basketball player, world champion (1959).

=== 25 ===
- Dame Margaret Anstee, 90, British diplomat, Director-General of the UN Office in Vienna (1987–1992).
- Ted Banks, 82, American track and field coach.
- Robert Todd Carroll, 71, American academic, scientific skeptic and writer (The Skeptic's Dictionary), cancer.
- James Cronin, 84, American physicist, laureate of the Nobel Prize in Physics (1980).
- Paul Dade, 64, American baseball player (Cleveland Indians, San Diego Padres), cancer.
- André Dehertoghe, 75, Belgian Olympic middle-distance runner (1968, 1972).
- Maria Eugénia, 89, Portuguese actress.
- Warren Hinckle, 77, American political journalist, pneumonia.
- Rodolfo Illanes, 58, Bolivian politician, beaten.
- Marvin Kaplan, 89, American actor (It's a Mad, Mad, Mad, Mad World, Alice, The Great Race).
- Anna Kurska, 87, Polish politician, member of the Senate (2001–2007).
- Sergey Marchuk, 64, Russian speed skater, European champion (1978).
- Wynona Mulcaster, 101, Canadian painter and teacher.
- Josef Prokeš, 83, Czech Olympic skier.
- Sonia Rykiel, 86, French fashion designer, Parkinson's disease.
- Eddy Silitonga, 65, Indonesian singer.
- G. Spencer-Brown, 93, English polymath.
- Rudy Van Gelder, 91, American recording engineer.

=== 26 ===
- Peter Barry, 88, Irish politician, Minister for Foreign Affairs (1982–1987), Tánaiste (1987), TD (1969–1997).
- Graham Cairns-Smith, 84, British scientist.
- Paul Comi, 84, American actor (Cape Fear, The Towering Inferno, Rawhide).
- Hatuey de Camps, 69, Dominican politician, President of the Chamber of Deputies (1979–1982), cancer.
- Joe DeMaestri, 87, American baseball player (Philadelphia/Kansas City Athletics, New York Yankees).
- James Doyle, 78, American politician, Mayor of Pawtucket, Rhode Island (1997–2011).
- Bill Etra, 69, American inventor (Rutt/Etra Video Synthesizer), heart failure.
- Harald Grønningen, 81, Norwegian cross-country skier, Olympic champion (1968).
- Phyllis Harmon, 99, American cycling advocate.
- Steve Korcheck, 84, American baseball player (Washington Senators) and college president (State College of Florida, Manatee–Sarasota), heart failure.
- Winfried Menrad, 77, German politician, MEP (1989–2004).
- J. Alec Motyer, 91, Irish-born British biblical scholar.
- Michael Phillips, British ice dancer. (death announced on this date)
- Anton Pronk, 75, Dutch footballer (Ajax, national team), amyotrophic lateral sclerosis.
- Martyn Quayle, 57, Manx politician, member of the House of Keys (2001–2011), injuries sustained in a fall.
- Davoud Rashidi, 83, Iranian actor.
- Jānis Reinis, 55, Latvian actor.
- Calie Reitz, 89, South African Olympic wrestler.
- E. Parry Thomas, 95, American banker and businessman.
- Jiří Tichý, 82, Czech football player.
- Erika Wallner, 70, Argentine actress, kidney failure.

=== 27 ===
- Alcindo, 71, Brazilian footballer (Grêmio), diabetes.
- Joy Browne, 71, American talk show host.
- Ronnie Cope, 81, English football player and manager (Manchester United, Luton Town).
- Tamim Chowdhury, 30, Bangladeshi-Canadian emir of ISIL in Bangladesh, shot.
- Cookie, 83, Australian-born Major Mitchell's cockatoo, world's oldest parrot, euthanized.
- Alan Cuthbert, 84, British pharmacologist.
- Jaime Davidovich, 79, Argentine-American artist.
- Leon Everitt, 69, American baseball player (San Diego Padres).
- Jean-Paul Fouletier, 77, French Olympic weightlifter (1968, 1972).
- Cesare Gelli, 83, Italian actor.
- Bill Lenkaitis, 70, American football player (New England Patriots), brain cancer.
- Zenzo Matsuyama, 91, Japanese screenwriter and director.
- Edward Quick, 81, American politician.
- Alan Smith, 77, English footballer (Torquay).
- Hans Stenberg, 63, Swedish politician, MP (1991–2010).
- Peter Stephens, 88, British journalist and newspaper editor.

=== 28 ===
- Ben Ada, 84, Guamanian politician.
- Hubbard Alexander, 77, American football coach (Dallas Cowboys).
- Sir Ronald Arculus, 93, British diplomat and businessman, Ambassador to Italy (1979–1983).
- Henry Judd Baker, American actor.
- Binyamin Ben-Eliezer, 80, Iraqi-born Israeli politician, member of the Knesset (1984–2014), Defense Minister (2001–2002), kidney disease.
- Mr. Fuji, 82, American professional wrestler and manager (WWF).
- Juan Gabriel, 66, Mexican singer and songwriter, heart attack.
- Lennart Häggroth, 76, Swedish ice hockey player, world champion (1962) and Olympic silver medalist (1964).
- Joe R. Hicks, 75, American social activist.
- Nate Hirsch, 68, American sports broadcaster (Georgia Southern Eagles).
- William H. Lacy Jr., 71, American businessman, CEO of MGIC (1987–1999), respiratory failure.
- Volodymyr Patyk, 89, Ukrainian artist.
- Ken Purchase, 77, British politician, MP (1992–2010).
- Shahid Qadri, 74, Bangladeshi poet, kidney disease.
- Mohammad Shafi Qureshi, 86, Indian politician, Governor of Madhya Pradesh (1993–1998), Uttar Pradesh (1996, 1998), and Bihar (1991–1993).
- Charles Z. Smith, 89, American judge, Justice of the Washington Supreme Court (1988–2002).
- Darrell Ward, 52, American reality television personality (Ice Road Truckers), plane crash.

=== 29 ===
- Erkin Alymbekov, 54, Kyrgyz politician.
- Bronisław Baczko, 92, Polish philosopher.
- Ken Black, 84, Canadian politician.
- Joan Chambers, 86, Australian politician, member of the Victorian Legislative Assembly for Ballarat South (1979–1982).
- Michael Di Pasqua, 63, American jazz drummer.
- Dee Dowis, 48, American football player (U.S. Air Force Academy), traffic collision.
- Erwin Gabathuler, 83, Northern Irish nuclear physicist.
- Nestor Ignat, 98, Romanian journalist.
- Yunus Jaffery, 86, Indian Persian scholar.
- Harry Jepson, 96, English rugby league administrator.
- Tommaso Labranca, 54, Italian writer.
- Ed Latter, 88, New Zealand military officer, politician, MP for Marlborough (1975–1978), and diplomat, High Commissioner to Canada (1980–1985).
- Reg Matthewson, 77, English footballer (Sheffield United, Fulham).
- Anne O'Brien, 60, Irish footballer (Reims, Lazio, Trani).
- Dinanath Pathy, 74, Indian painter and art historian.
- Ann Smyrner, 81, Danish actress (Reptilicus).
- Vedat Türkali, 97, Turkish playwright, novelist and screenwriter, multiple organ dysfunction.
- Gene Wilder, 83, American actor (The Producers, Willy Wonka & the Chocolate Factory, Young Frankenstein) and screenwriter, Emmy winner (2003), complications from Alzheimer's disease.

=== 30 ===
- Abu Mohammad al-Adnani, 38/39, Syrian Islamist leader (ISIL in Syria), bombing.
- Eleanor Barooshian, 66, American rock musician (The Cake).
- Josip Bukal, 70, Bosnian footballer.
- Věra Čáslavská, 74, Czech gymnast, Olympic champion (1964, 1968), pancreatic cancer.
- Dan Dryden, 72, American politician, member of the South Dakota House of Representatives (since 2011), cancer.
- Dave Durie, 85, English footballer (Blackpool, Chester City).
- Nabile Farès, 75, Algerian-born French novelist.
- Hoot Hester, 65, American fiddle player, cancer.
- Frederick King, 93, Canadian politician, MP (1979–1988).
- David Lavery, 67, American academic and television historian (Buffy the Vampire Slayer).
- Doris McLemore, 89, American teacher, last fluent speaker of the Wichita language.
- Marc Riboud, 93, French photographer.
- Brian Robinson, 76, New Zealand inorganic chemist.
- John Sacher, 76, British retailer (Marks & Spencer).
- George R. Sprague, 78, American politician.
- Joe Sutter, 95, American aeronautical engineer, chief designer of the Boeing 747.
- Zoe Tynan, 18, English footballer, suicide by train.

=== 31 ===
- Antonino Fernández Rodríguez, 98, Spanish businessman.
- James Hinesly, 82, American football player (Hamilton Tiger-Cats).
- Nathan Lyons, 86, American photographer.
- B. Daniel Riley, 70, American politician, member of the Maryland House of Delegates (1999–2003, 2007–2011).
- Myron Tribus, 94, American organizational theorist.
- David H. Trump, 85, British archaeologist.
- Brian Wildsmith, 86, English painter and children's book illustrator.
- Miles Vaughan Williams, 98, British pharmacologist.
- Mike Yakymyk, 93, Canadian football player (Regina/Saskatchewan Roughriders).
- Kashmiri Lal Zakir, 97, Indian poet and novelist.
