= James Hines =

James Hines may refer to:

- James R. Hines Jr. (born 1958), American tax economist
- James Joseph Hines (1876–1957), American politician
- Jimmy Hines (1903–1986), American golfer
- Jim Hines (born 1946), American sprinter
- James Hines (born 1960), known as Bobby Fulton, American professional wrestler
- Jim C. Hines (born 1974), American writer
- James K. Hines (1852–1932), Associate Justice of the Supreme Court of Georgia

== See also ==
- Hines (name), including a list of people with the name
- James Hind (c. 1616–1652), English highwayman
- James Hinesly (born 1931), Canadian football player
- Jim Hinds (born 1937), British cyclist
- Jim Himes (born 1966), American businessman and politician
- James Hynes (born 1955), American novelist
- James P. Hynes, British businessman
