= Rana Reider =

American track and field coach (born 1970)

- Born: July 8, 1970 (age 55); United States
- Education: Norco High School; Riverside City College; California Baptist University
- Occupations: Track and field coach

Rana Reider (born July 8, 1970) is an American track and field coach, who specializes in coaching the sprinting events, long jump, and triple jump. Throughout his career, he has coached Christian Taylor, Andre De Grasse, Bryan Clay, Marcell Jacobs and Tianna Bartoletta, who collectively have won Olympic gold medals in six different events (100m, 200m, 4x100m, long jump, triple jump, and decathlon). Reider currently is a coach for Tumbleweed Track Club in Jacksonville, Florida.

== Early life ==
Reider grew up in Corona, California. He attended Norco High School where he was a soccer player as well as a triple jumper. Reider attended his first coaching clinic while still in high school, in his senior year. After high school he attended Riverside City College for four years where he continued to be a triple jumper and also worked as an assistant to coach Ted Banks. Reider then attended California Baptist University where he also coached. He graduated in 1997 with a degree in kinesiology.

== Career ==
After gaining coaching experience at smaller colleges, Reider was hired as a coach at several big universities which included the University of Florida, Kansas State University and Clemson University. It was at the University of Florida that Reider met Christian Taylor.

In 2011, USA Track & Field named Reider the coach of the year for coaching three athletes to medal performances at the 2011 World Championships in Athletics.

Reider has also worked as a coach outside the U.S. and was required to move abroad. Austria hired him in preparation for the 2012 Summer Olympics. From 2013 to 2014, Reider coached athletes for the United Kingdom in Loughborough. When he requested for athletes to move to Loughborough from London, they negatively reacted to it. Reider later would criticize the UK's system and stated its athletes have a mindset of not wanting to step out of their comfort zone which limits them. In late 2014, he worked as a coach for the Netherlands at the National Sports Centre Papendal where he trained athletes such as Dafne Schippers. Some of the athletes he coached from Britain such as Adam Gemili, Martyn Rooney, Shara Proctor and Tiffany Porter all moved to the Netherlands to continue training under him.

In November 2021, Reider was under investigation for alleged sexual misconduct by the U.S. Center for SafeSport. There were claims that Reider had an affair with an 18-year-old British female athlete back in 2014 when he was 44. UK Athletics told its athletes to end all contact with him. In addition, he was not allowed to coach unless supervised by another adult and was also prohibited from contacting certain individuals. In July 2022, Reider was ejected by the police from Hayward Field that hosted the 2022 World Athletics Championships after he gained unauthorized access to the premises. In May 2023, after 18 months the investigation was completed and Reider was given a one-year probation. Reider admitted that the affair was real, but claimed it was consensual.

In August 2024, Reider was ejected from the 2024 Summer Olympics after the Canadian Olympic Committee revoked his accreditation. This came after The Times reported that he had been accused of sexual and emotional abuse in separate lawsuits by three female athletes.

== Notable athletes coached ==
=== USA ===
- Christian Taylor
- Dwight Phillips
- Bryan Clay
- Tianna Bartoletta
- Marvin Bracy
- Trayvon Bromell

=== United Kingdom ===
- Adam Gemili
- Martyn Rooney
- Shara Proctor
- Tiffany Porter
- Desirèe Henry
- Daryll Neita
- Anyika Onuora
- Lynsey Sharp
- Laviai Nielsen

=== Canada ===
- Andre De Grasse

=== Netherlands ===
- Dafne Schippers

=== China ===
- Xie Zhenye
- Wei Yongli

=== Japan ===
- Abdul Hakim Sani Brown

=== Italy ===
- Marcell Jacobs

== Personal life ==
Reider is married to his wife Cyndie who was a soccer player at Norco High School. They have a son and daughter.

Reider has four brothers who grew up with him in Corona. One of them is a principal at Susan B. Anthony Elementary School.
