= Pattiann Rogers =

American poet (born 1940)

Pattiann Rogers (born 1940) is an American poet, and a recipient of the Lannan Literary Award for Poetry. In 2018, she was awarded a special John Burroughs Medal for Lifetime Achievement in Nature Poetry.

== Life ==
Pattiann Rogers is an American poet who lives in Colorado with her husband and has two sons and three grandsons. She was born in Joplin, Missouri, and graduated Phi Beta Kappa with a bachelor's degree from the University of Missouri in 1961. She received a Master of Arts degree from the University of Houston in 1981. She taught as a visiting writer at the University of Texas at Austin, the University of Montana, and at Washington University in St. Louis. In 2002, she was the Ferrol Sams Distinguished Writer-in-Residence at Mercer University and was on the faculty of the low residency MFA Program in Creative Writing at Pacific University. She was associate professor, and taught in the MFA Creative Writing Program during the spring semesters, 1993 to 1997, at the University of Arkansas.

In May 2000, she was in residency at the Rockefeller Foundation's Bellagio Study and Conference Center in Bellagio, Italy. She is a contributing editor at The Alaska Quarterly Review.

Ms. Rogers is the mother of renowned materials scientist Professor John A. Rogers, at Northwestern University. Her second son, Artie Rogers, is currently Game Director at Kingsisle Entertainment in Austin TX in his third decade in the gaming industry.

== Grants, Fellowships, and Awards ==
Firekeeper was chosen by Publishers Weekly as one of the Best Books Published in 1994, was one of five finalists for the Lenore Marshall Poetry Prize (given by the Academy of American Poets) in 1994, and received the Natalie Ornish Poetry Award from the Texas Institute of Letters. Song of the World Becoming (Milkweed Editions, 2001) contains all of Rogers' poems previously published in her books through 2001, 40 new poems, and line and title indexes. It was a finalist for the Los Angeles Times Book Award and was named an Editor's Choice, Top of the List by Booklist.

In 2018, Rogers received a special John Burroughs Medal for Lifetime Achievement in Nature Poetry.
She has received two NEA Grants, 1982 and 1988, a Guggenheim Fellowship for 1984–85, and a Lannan Literary Fellowship in 1991 and a Lannan Literary Awards for Poetry in 2005.

Her poems were selected for publication in Best Spiritual Writing for 1999, 2000, 2001, 2002, and 2010 editions.
Her poetry appeared in The Best American Poetry of 1996 selected by Adrienne Rich, and The Best American Poetry of 2009, selected by David Wagoner.
She received five Pushcart Prizes Best of the Small Presses 1984, 1985, 1989, 1992 and 1999 editions.
Two Prairie Schooner Strousse Awards were won in 1993 and 1996.
The Theodore Roethke Prize from Poetry Northwest was awarded in 1981.
Poetry awarded her poems the Tietjens Prize in 1981, the Hokin Prize in 1982, and the Bock Prize in 1998.

She was the 1987 poet in residence at The Frost Place in Franconia, NH.
She was a judge for the National Poetry Series in 1999 and 2004, and co-poetry editor with Carl Phillips for the 2003 Pushcart Prize XXVII, Best of the Small Presses.
She was in residency at the Rockefeller's International Conference and Study Center in Bellagio, Italy, May, 2000.

== Books ==
- Quickening Fields. Penguin Group, NY, NY. 2017.
- Holy Heathen Rhapsody. Penguin Group, NY, NY. 2013.
- The Grand Array. Trinity University Press, San Antonio, TX. 2010.
- Wayfare. Penguin Group, NY, NY. 2008.
- Firekeeper, Selected Poems, Revised and Expanded Edition. Milkweed Editions, Minneapolis, MN. 2005.
- Generations. Penguin Group, NY, NY. 2004.
- Song of the World Becoming, New and Collected Poems, 1981 - 2001. Milkweed Editions, Minneapolis, MN. 2001. ISBN 157131413X.
- The Dream of the Marsh Wren, Writing as Reciprocal Creation. Milkweed Editions, Minneapolis, MN. 1999.
- A Covenant of Seasons. Hudson Hills Press, NY, NY. 1998., a collaboration with the artist Joellyn Duesberry
- Eating Bread and Honey. Milkweed Editions, Minneapolis, MN. 1997. ISBN 1571314067.
- Firekeeper, New and Selected Poems. Milkweed Editions, Minneapolis, MN. 1994. ISBN 1571314008.
- Geocentric. Peregrine-Smith, Salt Lake City, UT. 1993.
- Splitting and Binding. Wesleyan University Press, Middletown, CT. 1989. Archived from the original on May 11, 2017.
- Legendary Performance. Ion Press, Memphis, TN. 1987. ISBN 0938507079.
- The Tattooed Lady in the Garden. Wesleyan University Press, Middletown, CT. 1986. ISBN 0819551457.
- The Expectations of Light. Princeton University Press, Princeton, NJ. 1981.

== Public poetry projects ==
The Language of Conservation, the Milwaukee Zoo's permanent exhibit of 54 signs containing lines of poetry installed throughout the zoo opened on June 19, 2010.
Pattiann Rogers was the Zoo's honorary poet and curator for the exhibit, which was produced in collaboration with the Milwaukee Public Library, the Zoological Society of Milwaukee, along with the Milwaukee County Zoo. Pattiann Rogers on the project: I wanted the poems to offer a new perspective, a different way of looking at landscapes and animals. A story on The Language of Conservation in the June 2010 issue of Wild Things, the Zoological Society's Newsletter. A Terrain.org article about the project written by Pattiann Rogers: Under The Open Sky: Poems On The Land. A map of the poetry installations at the zoo.
Address to the Zoo: 10001 West Bluemound Road, Milwaukee, WI 53226-4383
The Language of Conservation, Poetry in Library and Zoo Collaborations, Jane Preston, Editor; Sandra Alcosser, Lee Briccetti, Dr. John Fraser, Dr. Dan Wharton, Executive Editors; Poets House, New York City, NY, 2013. (This project is made possible by a grant from the U.S. Institute of Museum and Library Services.) www.poetshouse.org

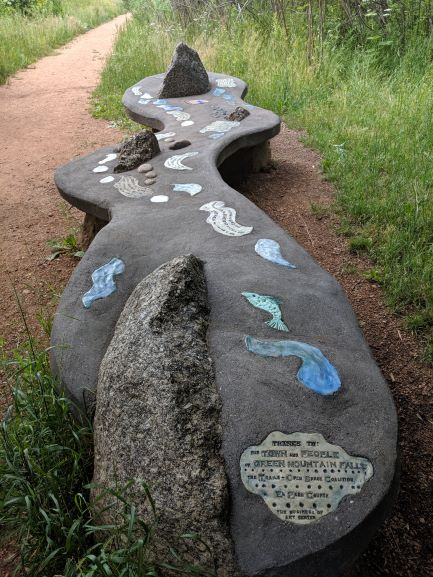
River Bench, 2003

Rogers worked with sculptor Steve Wood of Public Art Associates to create this bench along the American Discovery Trail in Green Mountain Falls, Colorado, at the base of Pikes Peak. It is a 4' x 15' concrete, stone and ceramic tile bench meant to withstand the elements for many years. The poems by Pattiann Rogers are on the tile pieces interspersed around the bench meant to be read at various angles of an oncoming potential reader.

Finding Poems Under the Open Sky, presents photographs and text on five different poetry trails installed in five different locations in the U.S.. One of the five sections (text by Pattiann Rogers) describes the goals and installations of the Milwaukee County Zoo signs and photographs. The four other sections contain descriptions and goals written by those who installed each trail. World Literature Today, January–February, 2013, Volume 87, Number 1, Editor Daniel Simon, University of Oklahoma, Norman, Oklahoma.

== Sowell Collection ==
The Sowell Collection at Texas Tech University acquired the unique papers of Pattiann Rogers and have made them available for public viewing.

- Pattiann Rogers' papers at The Sowell Collection - Overview and Table of Contents. Search papers from 1960 through 2010.
- Category archives in the Sowell Collection blog for Pattiann Rogers
- About The Sowell Family Collection in Literature, Community and the Natural World

== Interviews and essays (a partial listing) ==
Jellema, Rod, Pattiann Rogers: Two Readings of her Poems, essay by Rod Jellema, Innisfree Poetry Journal, www.innisfreepoetry.org, Innisfree 28, 2018

Kelley, Tina, Naming the Natural World, Pattiann Rogers on her 13th collection and celebrating science in poetry, Poetry Foundation, June 21, 2017

Brachman, Jo, "Cosmology's Celebration: An Interview with Pattiann Rogers", Terminus Magazine, Issue 13, 2016, published by School of Literature, Media and Communication and Georgia Tech's Ivan Allen Colleges

Rogers, Pattiann, Finding Poems Under the Open Sky, World Literature Today, January–February, 2013, Volume 87, Number 1

Johnston, Gorden, Breaking Old Forms: A Conversation with Gordon Johnston , Georgia Review - This interview also appears in its entirety in The Grand Array. Trinity University Press, San Antonio, TX. 2010. by Pattiann Rogers)

Doyle, Brian, Poems that Possess Me like New Music in the Blood: An Interview with Pattiann Rogers, Image, a Journal of the Arts and Religion, Center for Religious Humanism, Seattle Pacific University, Seattle WA. - This interview also appears in its entirety in The Grand Array. Trinity University Press, San Antonio, TX. 2010. by Pattiann Rogers)

Perry, Carolyn and Zade, Wayne, A Conversation with Pattiann Rogers, The Missouri Review, Volume 32, Number 4, Winter 2009

Gailey Jeannine Hall, An Interview with Poet, Pattiann Rogers, Poets & Writers, June 30, 2008

Josephine Pallos, Coming into Being: An Interview with Pattiann Rogers, The Gettysburg Review, Gettysburg College, Gettysburg, PA, Vol. 15, Number 1, Spring, 2002

Elliott, David, 'Praise is a Generative Act,' A Conversation with Pattiann Rogers, Tampa Review, Spring, 1999

Seyburn, Patty, "Interview with Pattiann Rogers," Gulf Coast, U. of Houston, Houston, TX, Spring, 1997

Walker, Casey, "Pattiann Rogers, an Interview and Poetry," Wild Duck Review, April, 1997

Whitehouse, Shelia, "An Interview with Pattiann Rogers," South Carolina Review, Fall, 1992

Seale, Jan Epton, “Interview with Pattiann Rogers,” Concho River Review, Spring, 1991

Bryan, Sharon, "Interview: Pattiann Rogers," River City Review, Spring, 1990

McCann, Richard, "An Interview with Richard McCann", Iowa Review Volume 17, no 2, Spring/Summer 1987 - This interview also appears in its entirety in The Grand Array. Trinity University Press, San Antonio, TX. 2010. by Pattiann Rogers)

== Reviews of published work (a partial listing) ==
Reviews of Quickening Fields, published 2017

- McDonnell, Anne Haven, "Anne Haven McDonnell reviews Quickening Fields, poems by Pattiann Rogers", March 2, 2019
- Felsenthal, Alan, "Eight Poets Recommended New and Recent Titles", November 7, 2017
- Kelley, Tina, "On Quickening Fields by Pattiann Rogers", Georgia Review, 2018

Reviews of Holy Heathen Rhapsody, 2013

- Held, Denis, "Review: The Visioin of the Seer, February 13, 2014
- Nash, Susan Smith, World Literature Today, May-August, 2014
- Williams, Lisa, Orion, Nature/Culture, January/February, 2014

Reviews of Wayfare, published 2008

- Kutchins, Laurie, Orion, Nature/Culture, November/December, 2008
- Gailey, Jeannine Hall, Wayfare, Penguin Books, 2008
- Publishers Weekly, 2007
- Prairie Schooner, 2006

Review of Firekeeper, Selected Poems, Revised and Expanded Edition, published 2005 Brachman, Jo, All There Is----Pattiann Rogers' Firekeeper: New and Selected Poems, Terminus Magazine, Issue 13, 2016, published by School of Literature, Media and Communication and Georgia Tech's Ivan Allen College

- Tracy, D.H, Poetry, May, 2006

Review of Generations, published 2003

- Marek, Jayne E., "Three Ways to Touch the World", Notre Dame Review, 2004

Reviews of Song of the World Becoming, New and Collected Poems, 1981 - 2001, published 2001 (partial)

- Buttel, Robert, "Naming the Soul", American Book Review, May–June, 2002
- Moos, Kate, "Unwinding Sunlight", Ruminator Review, “Unwinding Sunlight", Spring, 2002
- Berger, Rose Marie, "Worth Nothing", Sojourners, Worth Nothing, September–October, 2001
- Gonzalez, Ray, The Bloomsbury Review, Poetry Reviews, by Ray Gonzalez, March – April, 2001
- Ingham, Ken, Audubon Naturalist News, Book Reviews, July – August, 2001
- Spirituality and Health, May, 2001
- Seaman, Donna, Booklist, (starred review), March 14, 2001
- Whited, Stephen, Book, Poetry Review, July – August, 2001

Reviews of Firekeeper, New and Selected Poems, published 1994

- Brown-Davidson,Terri, Review, Prairie Schooner, Fall, 1996
- Ullman, Leslie, "Short Reviews,” Poetry, December, 1996
- Bloomsbury Review, "Recent Recommended Poetry," January–February, 1995
- Budin, Sue E., Kliatt, January, 1995
- Carlisle, Susan, Harvard Review, No. 8, May, 1995
- Collins, Floyd, "Motives for Metaphor," The Gettysburg Review, Spring, 1995
- Edwards, Wayne, Small Press Review, April, 1995
- Kitchen, Judith, "Fourteen Ways of Looking at Selecteds," The Georgia Review, Summer, 1995
- Eckman, Fred, “Entertainment, Books,” Star Tribune, October 23, 1994
- Ellis, Steven, Library Journal, August, 1994
- Gunderson, Elizabeth, Booklist, September 1, 1994
- Merrill, Christopher, Book Reviews, Orion, Fall, 1994
- Publishers Weekly, August 29, 1994

Reviews of Splitting and Binding, published 1989

- Goding, Cecile, "Unpretty Sentences, Beautiful Structure," Illinois Writers Review, Spring, 1992
- Collins, Floyd, "Variations on the Journey Motif," The Gettysburg Review, Spring, 1991
- Porterfield, Kay Marie, "Giving Voice to Vision," Bloomsbury Review, June, 1991
- Grosholz, Emily, "Reviews," The Hudson Review, June, 1990
- Guereschi, Edward, "Bridesmaids and Veterans," American Book Review, Nov-Dec, 1990
- Mazur, Gail, "Brief Reviews," Poetry, Volume CLVI, No. 4, July, 1990
- Publishers Weekly, August 4, 1989

Reviews of Legendary Performance, published 1987

- Sampson, Dennis, The Hudson Review, Summer, 1988
- Stitt, Peter, "Aestheticians and the Pit of the Self," Poetry, Volume CLII, No. 3, June, 1988

Reviews of The Tattooed Lady in the Garden, published 1986

- Bizzaro, Patrick, "Poetry and Audience: A Look at Ten Books," Raccoon 28, May, 1988
- Fulton, Alice, "Main Things," Poetry, Volume CLI, No. 4, January, 1988
- Merrill, Christopher, "Voyages into the Immediate: Recent Nature Writings," New England Review/Breadloaf Quarterly, Volume X, No. 3, Spring, 1988
- Allen, Dick, "Poetry I, Charles Tomlinson, Pattiann Rogers, Geoffrey Hill and others," The Hudson Review, Volume XL, No. 3, Autumn, 1987
- Gwynn, R.S., "Second Gear: Review of Leon Stokesbury, Edward Hirsch, Pattiann Rogers and Timothy Steele," The New *England Review/Breadloaf Quarterly, Volume IX, No. 1, Autumn, 1986

Reviews of The Expectations of Light, published 1981

- Hoagland, Tony, "The Expectations of Light, by Pattiann Rogers," Telescope, Volume 3, No. 1, Winter, 1983
- Hopes, David, "Reviews and so Forth," The Hiram Poetry Review, Issue No. 32, Spring-Summer, 1983
- McClatchy, J.D., "Short Reviews," Poetry, Volume CXLIII, No. 3, December, 1983
- Martz, Louis L., "Ammons, Warren, and the Tribe of Walt," The Yale Review, Autumn, 1982
- Stitt, Peter, "The Objective Mode in Contemporary Lyric Poetry," The Georgia Review, Volume 36, No. 2, Summer, 1982
- Brown, Laurie, the Library Journal, January, 1982

== Anthologies containing Rogers' poems ==
- Fire and Rain: Ecopoetry of California, Foreword by Dana Gioia, edited by Lucille Lang Day and Ruth Nolan, Scarlet Tanager Books, Oakland, California, 2018
- The Practicing Poet, Writing Beyond the Basics, edited by Diane Lockward, Terrapin Books, 2018
- The Golden Shovel Anthology, New Poems Honoring Gwendolyn Brooks, edited by Peter Khan, Ravi Shankar, and Patricia Smith, The University of Arkansas Press, Fayetteville, AR, 2017
- If Bees are Few, A Hive of Bee Poems, edited by James P. Lenfestey, Editor, University of Minnesota Press, Minneapolis, MN, 2016
- Children & Nature, edited by George K. Russell, The Myrin Institute, Great Barrington, MA, 2014
- Animals and People, A Selection of Essays from Orion Magazine, copyright The Orion Society, 2013 (Animals and People, a poem by Pattiann Rogers)
- Literature and the Environment, A Reader on Nature and Culture, edited by Lorraine Anderson, Scott Slvic and Jon P. O'Grady, published by Pearson, 2013
- Yonder Mountain, An Ozarks Anthology, edited by Anthony Priest, The University of Arkansas Press, Fayetteville, AR, 2013
- The Ecopoetry Anthology, edited by Ann Fisher-Wirth and Laura-Gray Street, Trinity University Press, San Antonio, TX, 2013
- The Language of Conservation, Poetry in Library and Zoo Collaborations, edited by Jane Prestin, Poets House, New York City, 2013
- Green Mountains Review, 25th Anniversary Poetry Retrospective, Poetry Editor, Elizabeth Powell, Johnson State College, Johnson Vermont, 2012
- Poetry East, Great Poems, With Commentaries by Contemporary Poets, edited by Richard Jones, affiliated with DePaul University, 2012
- Collecting Life: Poets on Objects Known and Imagined, edited by Madelyn Garner and Andrea L. Watson, 3: A Taos Press, 2011
- Floating Bridge Review, Number Four, Edited by Kathleen Flenniken, Gerry McFarland, Devon Musgrave, Joel Panchot, John Pierce, and Ron Starr, Floating Bridge Press, Seattle, WA, 2011
- Mountain Record, The Zen Practitioner's Journal, Dharma Communications, Mt. Tremper, NY, 2011
- Poetry International, Editor in Chief, Ilya Kaminsky, San Diego State University Press, 2011
- Decomposition, An anthology of Fungi Inspired Poems, edited by Renee Roehl and Kelly Chadwick, Lost Horse Press, Sandpoint, Idaho, 2010
- Low Down and Coming On, A Feast of Delicious Poems about Pigs, edited by James P. Lenfestey, Red Dragon Fly Press, Northfield & Red Wing, Minnesota, 2010
- New Poets of the American West, An Anthology of Poets from Eleven Western States, edited by Lowell Jaeger, Many Voices Press, Flathead Valley Community College, 2010
- When She Named Fire, An Anthology of Contemporary Poetry by American Women, edited by Andrea Hollander Budy, Autumn House Press, Pittsburgh, 2009
- Women's Work, Modern Women Poets Writing in English, Edited by Eva Salzman and Amy Wack, Seren: the book imprint of Poetry, Wales Press Ltd., Bridgend, Wales, 2009
- Descant, Fifty Years, edited by Dave Kuhne, Daniel E. Williams, Charlotte Hogg, and Charlotte Willis, published by Texas Christian University, Fort Worth, TX, 2008
- Satellite Convulsions, Poems from Tin House, Published by Tin House Books, Portland Oregon and NY, NY 2008
- Strange Attractions, Poems of Love and Mathematics, edited by Sarah Glaz and JoAnne Growney, A.K. Peters Ltd., Wellesley, Massachusetts, 2008
- Earth Shattering, Ecopoems, edited by Neil Astley, BloodAxe Books, 2007
- EarthLight, Spiritual Wisdom for an Ecological Age, edited by Cindy Spring and Anthony Manousos, with Eric Sabelman and Sandy Farley, published by Friends Bulletin, 2007
- Say This of Horses, edited by C.E. Greer and Jenny Kander, University of Iowa Press, 2007
- The McSweeney's Book of Poets Picking Poets, edited by Dominic Luxford, McSweeney's Books, San Francisco, CA, 2007
- Home Ground, A Guide to the American Landscape, edited by Barry Lopez & Debra Gwartney, Trinity University Press, San Antonio, Tx, 2006
- The Pushcart Book of Poetry: The Best Poems From Thirty Years of The Pushcart Prize, edited by Joan Murry with the Pushcart Prize poetry editors, The Pushcart Press, Wainscott, NY, 2006
- Twenty Poems to Nourish Your Soul, Selected by Judith Valente and Charles Reynard, Loyola Press, 2006
- 180 More, Extraordinary Poems for Every Day, selected by Billy Collins, Random House Trade Paperbacks, 2005
- Imagine a World: Poetry for Peacemakers, edited by Peggy Rosenthal, Pax Christi, USA, Erie Pennsylvania, 2005
- Lasting, Poems on Aging, edited by Meg Files, Published by Pima Press, 2005
- Visiting Frost, Poems Inspired by the Life and Work of Robert Frost, edited by Sheila Coghill & Thom Tammaro, University of Iowa Press, 2005
- Birds in the Hand, edited by Dylan Nelson and Kent Nelson, Northpoint Press, 2004
- Falling From Grace in Texas, A Literary Response to the Demise of Paradise, edited by Rick Bass and Paul Christensen, Wings Press, San Antonio, TX, 2004
- O Taste and See, food poems, edited by David Lee Garrison & Terry Hermsen, Harmony Series, Bottom Dog Press, Huron, OH, 2004
- Poetric Animals and Animal Souls, by Randy Malamud, published by Palgrave Macmillan, NY, NY, 2003
- Sea of Voices, Isle of Story, A WIWA Anthology of the Best Contemporary Poetry, edited by Celeste Mergens & Marian Blue, Triple Tree Publishing, Eugene, OR, 2003
- Strongly Spent, Shenandoah, 50 Years of Poetry, edited by R.T. Smith, The Washington and Lee University Press, Lexington, Virginia, 2003
- Working the Dirt, An Anthology of Southern Poets, edited by Jennifer Horne, NewSouth Books, Montgomery, AL, 2003
- A Chorus for Peace, A Global Anthology of Poetry by Women, edited by Marilyn Arnold, Bonnie Ballif-Spanville, Kristen Tracy, University of Iowa Press, Iowa City, IA, 2002
- Best Spiritual Writing 2002, edited by Philip Zaleski, Harper San Francisco, 2002
- Ecopoetry, A Critical Introduction, edited by John Elder, The University of Utah Press, Salt Lake City, UT, 2002
- March Hares, The Best Poems from Fine Madness, 1982 – 2002, Fine Madness, Seattle, WA, 2002
- The Poetry Anthology, 1912 - 2002, Ninety Years of America's Most Distinguished Verse Magazine, edited by Joseph Parisi and Stephen Young, published by Ivan R. Dee Chicago, IL. 2002
- Best of Prairie Schooner, Fiction and Poetry, Edited by Hilda Raz, University of Nebraska Press, Lincoln and London, 2001
- Best Spiritual Writing 2001, edited by Philip Zaleski, Harper San Francisco, 2001
- Poets of the New Century, edited by Roger Weingarten and Richard M. Higgerson, David R. Godine, Publisher, Inc, Boston, Mass. 2001
- The Breath of Parted Lips, Voices from the Robert Frost Place, Cavan Kerry Press, Fort Lee, NJ, 2001
- The Measured Word, On Science and Poetry, edited by Kurt Brown, Milkweed Editions, 2001
- A Fine Excess: Fifty Years of the Beloit Poetry Journal, edited by Marion L. Stocking,
- The Beloit Poetry Journal Foundation, Inc., Lamoine, Maine, 2000
- American Nature Writing 2000, selected by John Murray, Oregon State University Press, Corvallis, OR, 2000
- Buck and Wing, Southern Poetry at 2000, ed. R.T. Smith, Shenandoah, Washington and Lee University Press, Spring, 2000, Lexington, VA, Vol. 50 Number 1, 2000
- Metre, A Magazine of International Poetry, edited by Justin Quinn and David Wheatley, in association with Lilliput Press, 2000
- Poetry Comes Up Where It Can, Poems from The Amicus Journal, 1990 – 2000, The University of Utah Press, Salt Lake City, UT, edited by Brian Swan, 2000
- The Paris Review, No. 157 Winter 2000, A Compendium of Fiction, Poetry, Interviews, Essays, Art and More by the editors of The Paris Review, Picador, NY 2000
- And What Rough Beast, Poems at the End of the Century, edited by Robert McGovern and Stephen Haven, The Ashland Poetry Press, Ashland University, Ashland, Ohio, 1999
- Best Spiritual Writing, 1999, Ed. Philip Zaleski, Harper San Francisco, 1999
- Wild Stars, Poetry from Art of the Wild, edited by Jill Wright, Starry Puddle Publishing, Los Angeles, CA, 1999
- Best Texas Writing, edited by Joe Ahearn and Brian Clements, Rancho Loco Press, Dallas, TX, 1998
- Intimate Nature, The Bond Between Women and Animals, edited by Linda Hogan, Deena Metzger, and Brenda Peterson, The Ballentine Publishing Group, 1998
- Pillow, Ed. Lily Pond, Celestial Arts, Berkeley, CA, 1998
- Pushcart Prize XXIII, Best of the Small Presses, Fall, 1998
- The Book of Love, edited by Diane Ackerman and Jeanne Macklin, W.W. Norton Company, 1998
- Verse and Universe, edited by Kurt Brown, Milkweed Editions, 1998
- Wild Song, Poems of the Natural World, Ed. John Daniel, Athens, Georgia: The University of Georgia Press, 1998
- Poetry, 85th Anniversary Issue, Ed. Joseph Parisi, Chicago: Modern Poetry Association, October/November, 1997
- The Portable Western Reader, edited by William Kittredge, Penguin Books, 1997
- Chicago Review, Fifty Years: A Retrospective Issue, edited by David Nicholls, Volume 42, Numbers 3 & 4, University of Chicago, 1996
- Claiming the Spirit Within, edited by Marilyn Sewell, Beacon Press, 1996
- Hard Choices, An Iowa Review Reader, edited by David Hamilton, University of Iowa Press, 1996
- The Best American Poetry 1996, selected by Adrienne Rich, edited by David Lehman, Scribner, 1996
- From the Island's Edge: A Sitka Reader, edited by Carolyn Servid, Graywolf Press, 1995
- High Fantastic, Colorado's Fantasy, Dark Fantasy, Science Fiction, edited by Steve Rasnic Tem, Ocean View Books, Denver, CO, 1995
- Poems for the Wild Earth, Blackberry Books, 1995
- The Writing Path 1, Poetry and Prose from Writers' Conferences, Edited by Michael Pettit, University of Iowa Press, Iowa City, Iowa, 1995
- What Will Suffice, Contemporary American Poets on the Art of Poetry, Edited by Christopher Buckley and Christopher Merrill, Gibbs Smith, Publisher, 1995
- Articulations, edited by Jon Mukand, University of Iowa Press, 1994
- Texas in Poetry, A 150 Year Anthology, edited by Billy Bob Hill, Center for Texas Studies, University of North Texas, 1994
- The Wesleyan Tradition: Four Decades of American Poetry, edited by Michael Collier, Wesleyan University Press, 1994
- Women on Hunting, edited by Pam Houston, The Ecco Press, 1994
- Poetry, A HarperCollins Pocket Anthology, edited by R.S Gwynn, HarperCollins College Publishers, 1993
- The Paris Review, No. 128 Fall 1993, A Compendium of Fiction, Poetry, Interviews, Essays, Art and More by the editors of The Paris Review, Picador, NY 1993
- The Sophisticated Cat, edited by Joyce Carol Oates, Dutton Press, 1993
- Pushcart Prize 17, Best of the Small Presses, edited by Bill Henderson, Avon Books, Wainscott, NY, 1992
- Heart of the Flower, Poems for the Sensuous Gardener, edited by Sondra Zeidenstein, Chicory Blue Press, 1991
- New American Poets of the 90's, edited by Jack Myers and Roger Weingarten, David R. Godine, Publisher, 1991
- Sisters of the Earth, edited by Lorraine Anderson, Vintage Books, A Division of Random House, 1991
- The Forgotten Language, Contemporary Poets and Nature, edited by Christopher Merrill, Peregrine Smith Books, Salt Lake City, UT, 1991
- Looking for Home, Women Writing About Exile, edited by Deborah Keenan and Roseann Lloyd,Milkweed Editions, 1990
- Vital Signs, Contemporary American Poetry from the University Presses, edited by Ronald Wallace, University of Wisconsin Press, 1990
- Pushcart Prize 14, Best of the Small Presses, edited by Bill Henderson, Avon Books, Wainscott, NY, 1989
- Keener Sounds, Selected Poems from The Georgia Review, edited by Stanley W. Lindberg and Stephen Corey, The University of Georgia Press, 1987
- Poetry, The 75th Anniversary Issue, edited by Joseph Parisi, The Modern Poetry Association, Chicago, IL, 1987
- Pushcart Prize X, Best of the Small Presses, Avon Books, 1985–86
- The Made Thing: An Anthology of Contemporary Southern Poetry, edited by Leon Stokesbury, University of Arkansas Press, 1986
- New American Poets of the 80s, edited by Jack Myers and Roger Weingarten, A. Wampeter Press/Poetry International Book, Green Harbor, MA, 1984
- Pushcart Prize IX, Best of the Small Presses, edited by Bill Henderson, Avon Books, Wainscott, NY, 1984
- The Morrow Anthology of Younger American Poets, edited by Dave Smith and David Bottoms, William P. Morrow Publishing Co., New York, NY, 1984
- Christmas in Texas, An original Celebration of the Holiday Season in Words and Sketches, edited by V.T. Abercrombie and Helen Williams, Brown Rabbit Press, Houston, TX, 1979
