= Erkin =

Erkin is a masculine Turkic given name which is also used as a surname. People with the name include:

== Given name ==
- Erkin Sidick (born 1958), Uyghur senior engineer at the Jet Propulsion Laboratory, USA.
- Erkin Abdulla (born 1978), Uyghur pop singer
- Erkin Alptekin (born 1939), Uyghur human rights activist from Germany
- Erkin Alymbekov (1961-2016), Kyrgyz politician
- Erkin Bairam (1958–2001), Cypriot-born New Zealand economist and academic
- Erkin Boydullayev (born 1984), Uzbek football player
- Erkin Doniyorov (born 1990), Uzbek judoka
- Erkin Gadirli (born 1972), Azerbaijani lawyer and politician
- Erkin Hadımoğlu (born 1972), Turkish musical artist
- Erkin Ibragimov (born 1980), Kyrgyz judoka
- Erkin Koray (1941–2023), Turkish musical artist
- Erkin Rakishev, Kazakh film director
- Erkin Shagaev (born 1959), Uzbek water polo player
- Erkin Adylbek Uulu (born 1991), Kyrgyz boxer

== Surname ==
- Behiç Erkin (1876–1961), Turkish soldier
- Caner Erkin (born 1988), Turkish football player
- Ferhunde Erkin (1909–2007), Turkish pianist
- Feridun Cemal Erkin (1899–1980) (1899-1980), Turkish diplomat and politician
- Sermet Erkin (born 1957), Turkish stage magician, journalist and theatre actor
- Ulvi Cemal Erkin (1906–1972), Turkish composer
