= Edgar Peltenburg =

Canadian archaeologist (1942-2016)

Edgar Peltenburg (28 May 1942 – 14 August 2016) was a Canadian archaeologist who specialised in the Prehistoric period, he conducted excavations in Scotland, Syria and Cyprus. He was emeritus professor of archaeology at the University of Edinburgh.

== Early life and education ==
Peltenburg was born in 1942 in Montreal, his family were Dutch refugees of WW II. He completed his BA in Ancient History and Archaeology (1963) and his PhD (1968) at Birmingham University. He excavated with Kathleen Kenyon at Jerusalem and Charles Burney in north-west Iran, he later worked with Trevor Watkins at Philia-Drakos.

== Publications ==
- Peltenburg, E. (1991). Kissonerga-Mosphilia: A major Chalcolithic site in Cyprus. Bulletin of the American Schools of Oriental Research, 282/283, 17–35.
- Peltenburg, E. (1993). Settlement Discontinuity and Resistance to Complexity in Cyprus, ca. 4500-2500 B.C.E. Bulletin of the American Schools of Oriental Research, 292(292), 9–23.
- Peltenburg, E. (2003). The Colonisation and Settlement of Cyprus. Investigations at Kissonerga-Mylouthkia, 1976-1996. Åström Verlag.
- Peltenburg, E. (2007). Hathor, faience and copper on Late Bronze Age Cyprus. Cahiers Du Centre d’Etudes Chypriotes, 37(1), 375–394.
