= Li Yinyuan =

Chinese physicist (1919–2016)

- 李荫远
- Born: 22 June 1919; Chengdu, Sichuan, China
- Died: 22 August 2016 (aged 97); Beijing, China
- Education: National Southwestern Associated University; Washington State University; Illinois State University
- Scientific career
- Fields: Solid-state physics, Magnetism

Li Yinyuan (Chinese: 李荫远; pinyin: Lǐ Yìnyuǎn; 22 June 1919 – 22 August 2016) was a Chinese electrical engineer and physicist. He was an academician of the Chinese Academy of Sciences (CAS).

== Biography ==
Li was recommended to Sichuan University in 1938 and transferred to National Southwestern Associated University in 1941. He became a teaching assistant in National Southwestern Associated University after his graduation. He moved to Washington State University by government study abroad scholarship in 1947 and earned his master's degree in 1948. Li then obtained a doctor's degree from Illinois State Normal University in 1951. He was forbidden to leave the United States due to the Korean War. He made research at Carnegie Institute of Technology between 1952 and 1955, and worked for Westinghouse Electric Corporation in 1955. Li returned to China in 1956 after his travel ban was lifted. He was assigned to Institute of Applied Physics, Chinese Academy of Sciences. Li's main research field was solid-state physics and magnetism, especially in the theoretical interpretation of statistical theory of order–disorder phase transition for alloys and anti-ferromagnets, the magnetic structure and superconchange theory of transition element, Raman scattering effect of double frequency radiation in the nonlinear optics with mismatched phase angle and quasi–one–dimensional conductivity of non-linear optic crystal lithium iodate–α. Li was elected an academician of the Chinese Academy of Sciences in 1980.

Li died on 22 August 2016 at the age of 97 in Beijing.
