= William H. Lacy Jr. =

William Howard Lacy Jr. (1945 – August 28, 2016) was the CEO of MGIC Investment from 1987 to 1999, the largest provider of private mortgage insurance in the United States. Lacy was among various Wisconsin business executives criticized for cashing in stock options while corporate profits remained flat.

He was born in Chicago and attended the United States Air Force Academy and graduated from the University of Wisconsin–Milwaukee with a bachelor's degree in Business Administration in 1968.

Lacy was a director of Johnson Controls, American Capital Access (ACA Capital) and Ocwen Financial Corp. He died of respiratory failure on August 28, 2016.
