= Mattie Adams =

Mattie May Adams
- Born: December 26, 1923
- Died: August 6, 2016 (aged 92)

Mattie May Adams (December 26, 1923 – August 6, 2016) was born in Boston's South End neighborhood. She attended the New England School of Art and Design and the Rhode Island School of Design. Adams became the first licensed African American interior designer in New England after opening Adams Interiors in Back Bay.

As an interior designer, Adams had many high-profile clients including the White House. Adams was a former member of the New England Minority Purchasing Council Board of Directors and President Jimmy Carter's Small Business Advisory Council.

Adams was also involved in the United Methodist Church of All Nations, where she developed a program to feed homeless families.

In 2023, she was recognized as one of "Boston's most admired, beloved, and successful Black Women leaders" by the Black Women Lead project.
