= Miguel Varela =

Filipino businessman and lawyer

Miguel B. Varela (c. 1940 – 24 August 2016) was a Filipino businessman, corporate lawyer, and management practitioner. He was the president and chairman of the Philippine Chamber of Commerce and Industry (PCCI), the largest business organization in the Philippines. He was also the president of the Employers Confederation of the Philippines (ECOP), the largest association of employers in the country.

== Education ==
Varela earned an Associate of Arts degree from San Beda College and a Bachelor of Laws degree from Ateneo de Manila University. He completed the Top Management and Productivity Program at the Asian Institute of Management (AIM) and attended special courses in Managerial Management and Organizational Development, Productivity, Legal Management, Labor and Industrial Relations, Development of Small and Medium Enterprises, under sponsorship of the International Labour Organization in Geneva, Switzerland; the Asian Productivity Organization (APO) and the Nikkeren in Japan.

== Business leadership ==
Varela has served in various capacities as a corporate lawyer and management practitioner. He has been the President and Chairman, Philippine Chamber of Commerce and Industry; Chairman of the Board of HK Securities, Inc.; President of the Transunion Corporation; Director of Union Industries, Inc.; Director of Acoje Holdings, Inc.; Director of Mabuhay Vinyl Corporation; and Chairman of The Lumier Group; Vice President for Corporate Affairs of General Diesel Corporation from 1976 to 1979; Director and Vice President of ASEAN Business Corporation; and Vice President and Corporate Counsel of F.J. Elizalde and Company from 1976 to 1979; and Assistant Manager in the Planning Research and Development Office of the National Economic and Development Authority from 1966 to 1970.

== Organizational affiliations ==
Varela has been the Chairman Emeritus of the Philippine Chamber of Commerce and Industry (PCCI). He has been Chairman of the Trade and International Affairs Committee at the PCCI.

He served as Chairman and President of the Employers Confederation of the Philippines (ECOP) from 1995 to 1999. He was Vice President of the ECOP in 1975.

He has been the President of the Philippines, Inc. (formerly TEAM Philippines Foundation); and President of the Philippine Association of Voluntary Arbitration Foundation, Inc. (PHVAF).

He has also been the Commissioner and Corporate Secretary of Streetwatch Commission and the Foundation for Crime Prevention; Vice President, Ateneo Law Alumni Foundation; and Director of the Makati Rotary Club.

He is an active member of the ASEAN Confederation of Employers, and the Management Association of the Philippines (MAP).

== Government ==
Varela served as Member (representing Employer and Industry Sector) of the Board of Directors of the Technical Education and Skills Development Authority (TESDA); Commissioner (representing the Business Sector) of the National Labor Relations Commission; Commissioner (representing employers) of the Social Security System; Member (representing Management) of the National Manpower and Youth Council; Commissioner (representing employers) of the Employees' Compensation Commission; Commissioner (representing employers) of the Occupational Safety and Health Board; and Director of the National Economic Council (now National Economic and Development Authority) from 1967 to 1972.

== Diplomacy ==
Varela was a Philippine Delegate (representing employers) to the International Labor Conference; head delegate, member, and participant in various international activities, such as the Philippine Business Delegation on the Presidential Visits to China, Malaysia, Brunei, Singapore, Japan, Indonesia, USA, New Zealand, and Hong Kong; the ASEAN Conference of Employers' Top Management; Top Management Forum on Role of New Ventures; Free Trade and Social Responsibility; and ASEAN Employers Symposium.

Varela is an Arbiter of the International Court of Arbitration (ICC) in Paris, France. He is also the Philippine Representative to the APEC Business Advisory Council; and the East Asia Business Advisory Council (EABC).
