= Monique Koeyers-Felida =

Curaçaoan politician (1967–2016)

Monique H. Koeyers-Felida (23 April 1967 – 15 August 2016) was a Curaçaoan politician of the Movement for the Future of Curaçao. She was a member of the Estates of Curaçao between 2010 and 2015. She was focused on matters related to education, culture, and sports.

In the 2012 elections Koeyers-Felida obtained 332 votes and was reelected. Suffering from cancer she resigned from the Estates in November 2015 and was replaced by Sithree van Heydoorn.

Before her time in office Koeyers-Felida worked as a teacher at the Marnix College and as a television presenter at TeleCuraçao.
