= Richard Wackar =

American football and basketball coach (1928–2016)

Biographical details
- Born: February 24, 1928
- Died: August 15, 2016 (aged 88)

Playing career

Football
- 1946–1950: Rutgers

Coaching career (HC unless noted)

Football
- 1964–1980: Glassboro State

Basketball
- 1956–1963: Glassboro State

Head coaching record
- Overall: 65–84–4 (football); 100–53 (basketball)

Accomplishments and honors

Championships
- Football; 5 NJSAC (1972, 1974–1977)

Richard Wackar (February 24, 1928 – August 15, 2016) was an American football and basketball coach. He served as the head football coach at Glassboro State College (now called Rowan University), an NCAA Division III program in Glassboro, New Jersey. He was the third all-time coach for the Profs and compiled a 65–84–4 record in 17 seasons. Wackar's most notable accomplishment is being recognized as the only coach in NJAC history to win conference championships in four sports (football, basketball, golf, and cross country).

Rowan University renamed their football stadium to Coach Richard Wackar Stadium at John Page Field.

== Head coaching record ==
=== Football ===
Year	Team	Overall	Conference	Standing	Bowl/playoffs
Glassboro State Profs (New Jersey State Athletic Conference) (1964–1980)
1964	Glassboro State	0–7			
1965	Glassboro State	0–8			
1966	Glassboro State	1–7–1			
1967	Glassboro State	3–5			
1968	Glassboro State	2–6			
1969	Glassboro State	5–3	2–1	2nd	
1970	Glassboro State	3–4–1	2–1	2nd	
1971	Glassboro State	2–6	1–2	T–2nd	
1972	Glassboro State	7–2	4–1	T–1st	
1973	Glassboro State	4–6	2–3	4th	
1974	Glassboro State	6–3–1	4–0–1	1st	
1975	Glassboro State	7–2–1	5–0	1st	
1976	Glassboro State	5–5	4–1	1st	
1977	Glassboro State	7–3	5–0	1st	
1978	Glassboro State	7–3	4–1	2nd	
1979	Glassboro State	2–8	2–3	4th	
1980	Glassboro State	4–6	4–2	3rd	
Glassboro State:		35–34			
Total:		65–84–4			
National championship Conference title Conference division title or championship game berth
