= Peter deCourcy Hero =

Peter deCourcy Hero (September 10, 1942 – August 21, 2016) was an American foundation and college president. He was also the founder and principal of The Hero Group. He was the grandson of Andrew Hero Jr.

== Career ==
Hero was born in Washington, D.C. in 1942. As President and CEO of the Silicon Valley Community Foundation, from 1989 to 2006 Hero grew total foundation charitable assets from under $9 million to over $1.2 billion. In this time he became the acknowledged catalyst to transform charitable giving in the region, and has since been recognized as a respected philanthropy expert. He successfully showed the region's emerging high-tech wealthy how to be both strategic and to make measurable high impact philanthropic investments, locally and globally. A feature article in the November 27, 2000 issue of Fortune titled "The Man Who Sold Silicon Valley On Giving" described Hero's pioneering donor-centric strategies, which have become widely adopted among American community foundations.

From 1985 to 1989, Hero served as President of The Maine College of Art, the largest cultural organization in Northern New England. During his tenure he was acknowledged for his leadership in the arts with a presidential appointment to the National Council on the Arts by President George H. W. Bush. He was also presidentially appointed to the National Board of the Institute for Museum and Library Services. Both appointments were confirmed by the U.S. Senate.

Hero served on the multiple national philanthropic boards. He served on the Board of Directors of PBS (Public Broadcasting Service) where he created and Chaired the PBS Foundation, raising over $20M in the first year. He was a Director of Sesame Workshop and the Skoll Foundation.

From 2008 to 2011, Hero served as Vice President for External Relations at Caltech. There, he created an integrated university structure for MarComm/Advancement and Alumni Functions, and this construct is now a model for other high-performing private institutions of higher education.

For 20 years, Hero was a leading advocate and consultant on building civil society, and grass roots philanthropy, in the United States and abroad. For 10 years, immediately following the 1989 Velvet Revolution, he led the creation of a network of community foundations throughout Central and Eastern Europe, supported by USAID, the Mott Foundation, the Ford Foundation, and other U.S. foundations. He then chaired a global Ford Foundation and World Bank Task Force on Community Development. For his leadership, then-Czech Republic President Václav Havel appointed him to the 2002 NATO Summit Council of Advisors in Prague.

Hero's latest book on civil society development, titled Local Mission - Global Vision: Community Foundations in the 21st Century was published in 2008 by the Foundation Center in New York, and has since been translated into 5 languages.

In 2011, Hero founded The Hero Group in order to promote strategic planning and organizational development among high-performing for-profit and nonprofit organizations.

He died of esophageal cancer on August 21, 2016 at the age of 73.

== Education ==
Hero held a BA and MA in Art History from Williams College where he was appointed a Kress Foundation Fellow for outstanding academic excellence, as well as an MBA from the Stanford University Graduate School of Business.
