= C. Welborn Daniel =

American politician

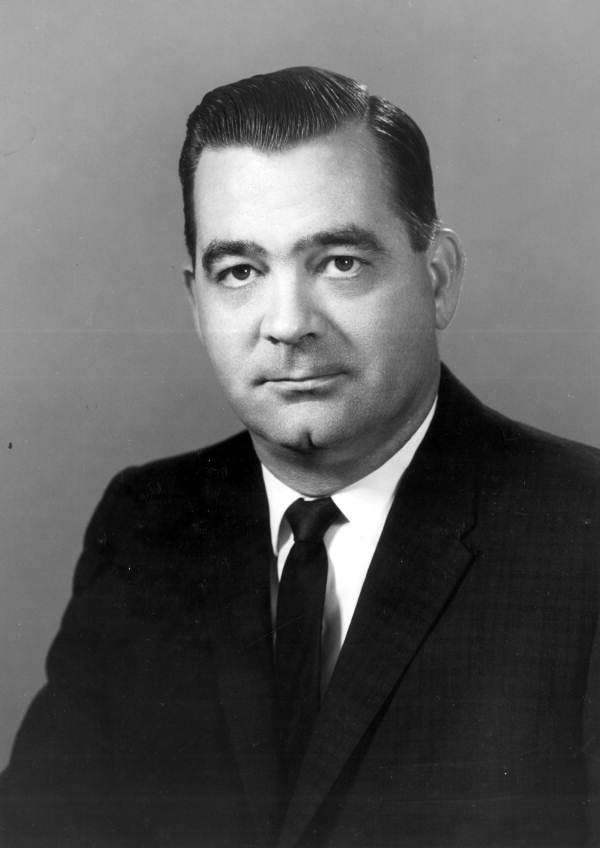

Member of the Florida House of Representatives from Lake County
- In office 1957–1964

Member of the Florida State Senate
- In office 1964–1966 (23rd district); 1969–1971 (15th district)

Personal details
- Born: July 12, 1926 Okeechobee, Florida
- Died: August 10, 2016 (aged 90) Leesburg, Florida
- Party: Democratic
- Spouse(s): Betty Janasik (m. 1955; div. 1969) Carol Sue Hutchinson (m. 1970)
- Education: University of Florida
- Occupation: Attorney, Judge, Legislator

C. Welborn Daniel (June 12, 1926 – August 10, 2016) was an American attorney, politician and judge in Lake County, Florida.

Daniel was born on June 12, 1926, in Okeechobee, Florida. He attended the University of Florida, where he was a member of the Phi Kappa Tau fraternity. In 1950, he earned an LL.B. from the university. He was named to the Florida bar in 1950. Upon graduation he returned to Lake County to practice law and where he continued to reside until his death. He also served in World War II with the United States Navy. He served in the Florida House of Representatives for Lake County from 1956 to 1964, as a Democrat. He was elected to the State Senate for the 23rd district in 1963 and served until 1966. He was once again elected to the State Senate in 1968, this time for district 15; he would serve until 1971. Starting in 1977 he served as a judge of the Florida 5th Circuit court in Tavares and then as a judge of the Florida 5th District Courts of Appeal in Daytona. Daniel died on August 10, 2016.
