= Mike Yakymyk =

Canadian football player

Profile
- Position: Halfback

Personal information
- Born: August 15, 1923
- Died: August 31, 2016 (aged 93); Regina, Saskatchewan, Canada
- Listed height: 5 ft 8 in (1.73 m)
- Listed weight: 265 lb (120 kg)

Career history
- 1946–1952: Regina/Saskatchewan Roughriders

Mike Yakymyk (August 15, 1923 – August 31, 2016) was a Canadian football player who played for the Regina/Saskatchewan Roughriders from 1946 to 1952. He played junior football in Regina.
