= Ria Vedder-Wubben =

Dutch politician

Member of the Senate
- In office 10 June 2003 – 7 June 2011

Personal details
- Born: 20 May 1951 The Hague, Netherlands
- Died: 23 August 2016 (aged 65) The Hague, Netherlands
- Party: Christian Democratic Appeal

Hendrika Cornelia Maria "Ria" Vedder-Wubben (20 May 1951 – 23 August 2016) was a Dutch politician. As a member of the Christian Democratic Appeal she served in the Senate from 2003 to 2011. In the Senate she was concerned with pensions and tax law.

== Career ==
Vedder-Wubben was born in the Hague on 20 May 1951. She attended the Hogere Burgerschool in Rijswijk. She subsequently studied to become an actuary. She spent her career in the field of actuarial science and pension advisement.

Vedder-Wubben became politically active for the Christian Democratic Appeal in The Hague. She subsequently became member of the Senate for the party, serving from 10 June 2003 until 7 June 2011. In 2010 a government plan to cut the Algemene Ouderdomswet partner allowance was likely to fail in the vote in the Senate, with Vedder-Wubben devising a new plan from which the government went ahead.

She died on 23 August 2016 in The Hague.
