= Paddy Deagan =

Australian rules footballer

Personal information
- Full name: Patrick Thomas Deagan
- Born: 16 June 1931
- Died: 14 August 2016 (aged 85)
- Original team: South Melbourne YCW
- Height: 185 cm (6 ft 1 in)
- Weight: 79 kg (174 lb)
- Position: Utility

Playing career^{1}
Years	Club	Games (Goals)
1951–54	South Melbourne	48 (26)
- ^{1} Playing statistics correct to the end of 1954.

Patrick Thomas 'Paddy' Deagan (16 June 1931 – 14 August 2016) was an Australian rules footballer who played with South Melbourne in the Victorian Football League (VFL).
