= Benet Rossell =

Spanish artist

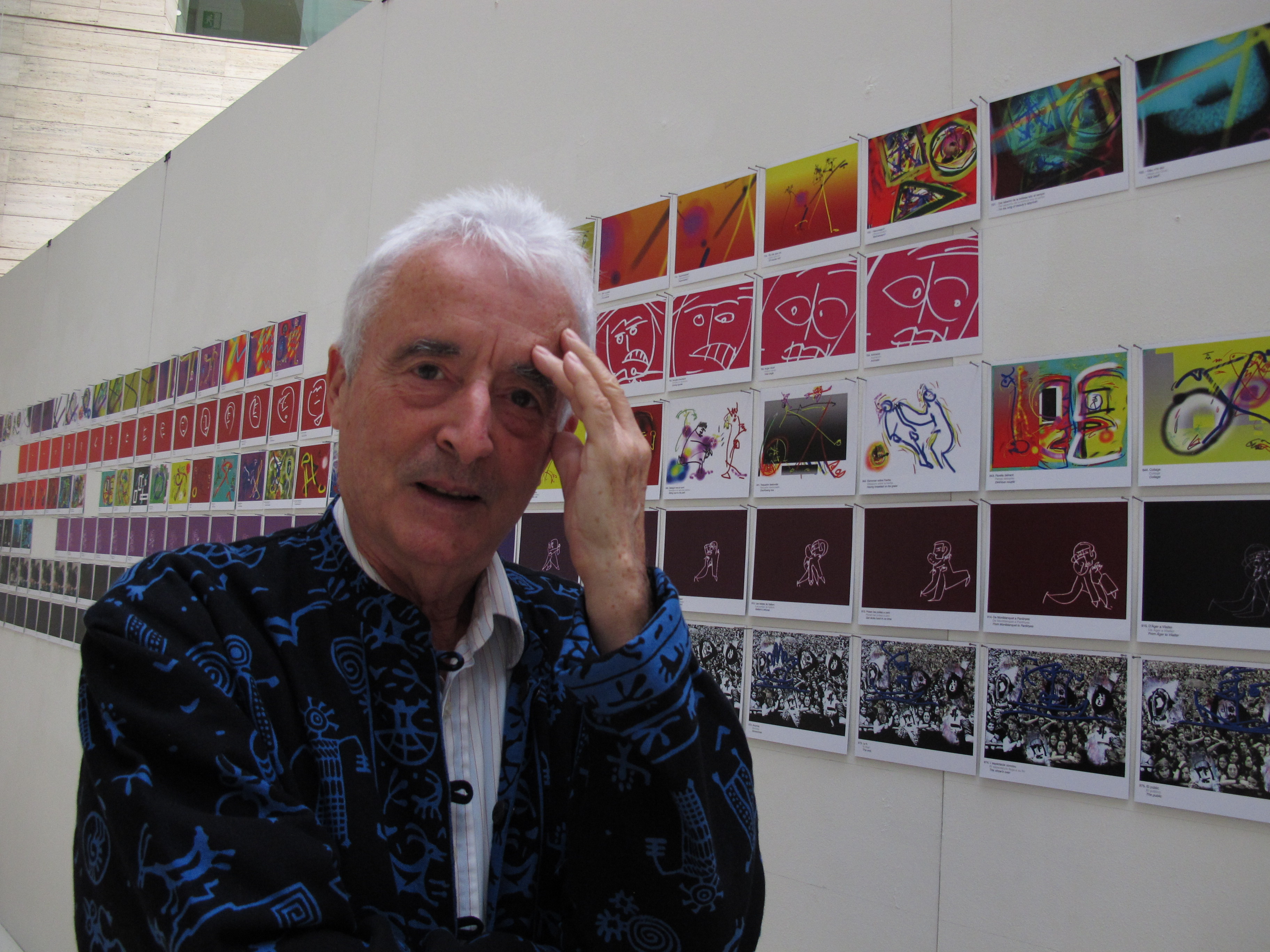
- Born: 23 October 1937; Àger, Spain
- Died: 21 August 2016 (aged 78); Barcelona, Spain
- Occupation: Artist

Benet Rossell i Sanuy (23 October 1937 – 21 August 2016) was a notable Spanish artist whose career spanned several decades and encompassed a diverse range of artistic endeavors.

== Early life and education ==
With an educational background in economics, law, and sociology from institutions in Barcelona and Madrid, Rossell's artistic journey took a significant turn in 1964 when he relocated to Paris, France. This city became his base for many years, from which he explored various cultures and artistic expressions through extensive travels, particularly in India, Nepal and New York.

There, he immersed himself in theatre and cinema training and became a key figure among the 'Catalan artists in Paris', collaborating frequently with contemporaries such as Jaume Xifra, Antoni Miralda, and Joan Rabascall. Despite their varied professional backgrounds, Rossell collaborated with these artists on multiple projects, reflecting a shared interest in exploring the ceremonial and ritual aspects of art.

== Artistic contributions ==
One of Rossell's notable collaborative works from this period was "Cerimonials" (1974), a film that is now part of the Museu d'Art Contemporani de Barcelona (MACBA) Collection. This project, which also involved Dorothée Selz, focused on documenting celebrations and rituals, highlighting the performative aspects of these cultural practices. Additionally, Rossell pursued film studies under Jean Rouch at the Comité du Film Ethnographique and attended the Université du Théâtre des Nations. These experiences were instrumental in shaping his understanding of total theatre, an approach that emphasizes the integration of celebration and ritual into the dramatic arts.

Rossell's artistic philosophy was deeply influenced by his encounters with diverse languages and symbolic systems, particularly those with which he was initially unfamiliar. Reflecting on this, Rossell noted:

"... closer to signic representation than text. I came into contact with languages whose codes I was wholly unfamiliar with, languages without codes for me. I found them fascinating, and they were quite possibly the origin of the language that I have cultivated throughout my artistic trajectory, which comes from a multiplicity of signs, icons, micrographies, calligrams or benigrams without a code, unrepeated and unrepeatable, that coexist, articulate and manifest themselves in a manner that is always unique, always reinvented, and that in the end form a micro-theatre or calligraphic representation of the great micro-theatre of the world."

These elements became central to his work, allowing him to create a unique visual language that merged calligraphic representation with the conceptual depth of micro-theatre.

== Legacy and death ==
Benet Rossell died on 21 August 2016 in Barcelona, Spain, suffering from amyotrophic lateral sclerosis. His legacy as an artist is marked by his innovative approach to visual and performative arts, as well as his contribution to expanding the boundaries of artistic expression through his exploration of signic representation and the theatricality of ritual and celebration.

Rossell's works are held in prestigious collections worldwide, including the Museo de Arte Moderno in Bogotá, Museu de Arte Contemporãnea in São Paulo, Musée d’art moderne in Céret, and the MACBA in Barcelona, further cementing his legacy as a profound influencer and innovator in the realms of contemporary art.
