= George R. Sprague =

Massachusetts politician (1938–2016)

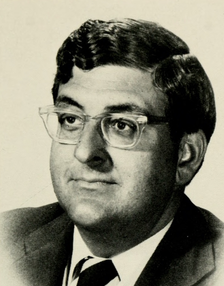

Member of the Massachusetts House of Representatives from the 59th Middlesex district
- In office 1973–1978

Personal details
- Born: June 19, 1938 Newton, Massachusetts
- Died: August 30, 2016 (aged 78)
- Education: Harvard College (BA); Boston University School of Law (LLB)

George R. Sprague (June 19, 1938 – August 30, 2016) was an American politician who was the member of the Massachusetts House of Representatives from the 59th Middlesex district.
