= Steve Pivovar =

- Born: September 9, 1952; Omaha, Nebraska, U.S.
- Died: August 10, 2016 (aged 63); Omaha, Nebraska, U.S.
- Education: University of Nebraska at Omaha
- Occupation: Sports journalist
- Employer: Omaha World-Herald
- Spouse: Sue
- Children: 3
- Awards: Robert C. Dorr Award (2010)

Steve Pivovar (September 9, 1952 – August 10, 2016), known as Piv Pivovar, was an American sports journalist for the Omaha World-Herald for over 45 years.

Pivovar died on August 10, 2016, at the age of 63, after a nine-month battle with renal cancer. He had also been recently diagnosed with pneumonia. The NCAA paid tribute to Pivovar on June 20 during what would have been the 500th consecutive CWS game staffed by Pivovar. “PIV,” as he was known, was etched behind home plate and along the foul lines. A press box seat was left empty in his honor throughout the tournament.

Mike Reilly, The World-Herald's executive editor and vice president, released a statement following Pivovar's death:

Sports journalism has lost a great warrior with the death of Steve Pivovar. Piv, as everyone called him, told his stories honestly, elegantly and humanely. His hard work and his reporting and writing skills earned him the respect of our subscribers and sports figures all over America. Piv was a trustworthy professional who pursued his craft tirelessly, always with humility and good humor. His colleagues at The World-Herald and sports writers across the U.S. leaned on Piv's generous spirit and encyclopedic knowledge of the College World Series and Creighton University sports. His dedication to journalism and World-Herald readers was an inspiring example to me and to many others in our newsroom. We mourn with Piv’s family.
