= Donald Lee (cricketer) =

South African cricketer (1933–2016)

Personal information
- Born: 29 April 1933; Vryburg, Cape Province, South Africa
- Died: 10 August 2016 (aged 83); Kimberley, Northern Cape, South Africa
- Source: ESPNcricinfo, 31 August 2016

Donald Lee (29 April 1933 – 10 August 2016) was a South African cricketer. He played first-class cricket for Griqualand West and Orange Free State between 1952 and 1968. Later in his career, he became a first-class cricket umpire. Lee continued to pass on his passion for cricket through his three children and five grandchildren, until his death in 2016.
