= Gerald J. Oppenheimer =

American librarian and scholar

- Born: Julius Oppenheimer; August 5, 1922; Frankfurt, Germany
- Died: August 23, 2016 (aged 94); Seattle, Washington, U.S.

Academic background
- Education: University of Washington; Harvard University

Academic work
- Main interests: Health sciences libraries, medical libraries, special libraries

Julius Oppenheimer (August 5, 1922 – August 23, 2016), known professionally as Gerald J. Oppenheimer, was an American librarian and scholar. He retired from the directorship of the Health Sciences Library at the University of Washington, a post he held from 1963 until 1987.

== Biography ==
Gerald Oppenheimer was born Julius Oppenheimer in Frankfurt am Main, Germany on August 5, 1922, the son of Jacob and Bella (Spier) Oppenheimer. He immigrated to the United States with his parents in 1940 via the Soviet Union, Mongolia, Korea, and Japan. He attended Whitman College in Walla Walla, Washington, for two years, after which the family settled in Seattle, where Oppenheimer attended college. He served in the U.S. Army from 1943-1944 and in the U.S. Coast Guard Voluntary Port Security Force in 1945. In 1946, he married Mildred Karnofsky.

He earned his bachelor's and master's degrees from the University of Washington in 1946 and 1947, respectively, and attended graduate school at Harvard University from 1947 to 1952. After earning a master's degree in library science from Columbia University in 1953, Oppenheimer worked as a librarian at the Seattle Public Library, head of the Fisheries/Oceanography Library at the University of Washington, and a manager of information services at Boeing Scientific Research Laboratories. In 1963, he became the director of the Health Sciences Library, a position he held until his retirement in 1987. Under his tenure, in 1968 the Health Sciences Library became only the second regional medical library in the country. He was also the founding president of the Association of Academic Health Sciences Library Directors. Throughout his career, Oppenheimer held multiple offices in the Medical Library Association, the National Library of Medicine, the National Cancer Institute, the Special Libraries Association, and the University of Washington.

After retirement, Oppenheimer served as the vice president, secretary, and archivist of the Puget Sound Association of Phi Beta Kappa and the executive secretary of Phi Beta Kappa's Alpha of Washington Chapter at the University of Washington. He died in Seattle, Washington on August 23, 2016.
