= Percival Turnbull (archaeologist) =

British archaeologist (1953-2016)

Percival Turnbull FSA
- Born: 1953; Coxhoe, County Durham, England
- Died: 20 August 2016 (aged 62); Mickleton, County Durham, England
- Citizenship: United Kingdom
- Scientific career
- Fields: Archaeology

Percival David Turnbull FSA (1953 - 20 August 2016) was a British archaeologist.

== Early life ==
Percival was born in Coxhoe, County Durham, in 1953. His father was a miner. He studied at the Institute of Archaeology, University of London, graduating in 1975.

== Career ==
Turnbull worked for Durham University and subsequently Durham, North Yorkshire and Cumbria county councils. He founded Brigantia Archaeological Practice in 1995 in Barnard Castle. He was elected a Fellow of the Society of Antiquaries of London in May 1990.

In 1983 Turnbull and Colin Haselgrove set up the Stanwick Research Project at the Department of Archaeology, Durham University.

He was a founder member of the Tees River Trust.

== Publications ==
- 1978, with Jones, R. F. J. and Clack, P. A. G. The archaeology of the coal measures and the magnesium limestone escarpment in Co. Durham : a preliminary survey. Barnard Castle, Bowes Museum.
- 1984. with Haselgrove, C. Stanwick : excavation and research : interim report 1984. Durham, Durham University Press.
- 1986. with Manby, T. Archaeology in the Pennines : studies in honour of Arthur Raistrick (BAR British Series 158). Oxford, British Archaeological Reports
- 2012. County Durham : the hidden history. Stroud, History.
