= Irving Sablosky =

American diplomat

Irving Sablosky (March 5, 1924 – August 3, 2016) was an American diplomat, lecturer, and teacher.

== Biography ==
Sablosky was born on March 5, 1924, in Indianapolis, Indiana, and went to Shortridge High School in 1941. After high school, he attended the Indiana University School of Music. In 1943, he joined the army and was initially sent to Fort Benning, Georgia, and then England for training. Sablosky was in the 106th Infantry Division. His unit was overrun during the Battle of the Bulge and Sablosky was taken prisoner by the Germans and was sent to Stalag IV-B, 60 miles south of Berlin. He was liberated on April 23, 1945 by the Red Army.

Once he returned to the United States, he reenrolled at Indiana University School of Music and wrote for the school paper, The Indiana Daily Student. After graduating in 1947, he became a music critic with the Chicago Daily News. In 1957, he joined the United States Information Agency. In 1958, he was sent to his first diplomatic post in Korea. He was then sent to Hamburg, Germany to be a cultural affairs officer. He went to the University of Chicago for American Studies from 1963 to 1964. He retired from the Foreign Service in 1980 and became an international lecturer. He was the author of American Music. Irving Sablosky died of cancer on August 3, 2016, at his home in Washington, DC.
