= Sally Katary =

Egyptologist and professor of Classical Studies

Sally L. D. Katary
- Born: October 11, 1946
- Died: August 6, 2016 (aged 69); Sudbury, Ontario
- Education: University of Pennsylvania, University of Toronto
- Occupations: professor, Egyptologist
- Years active: 1976-2013
- Employer: Thorneloe University

Sally Katary (11 October 1946 – 6 August 2016) was a university professor and Egyptologist, known for her work on the Wilbour Papyrus, land tenure in the Ramesside Period, and the social and economic history of Egypt from the New Kingdom through the Late Period.

== Biography ==
Sally Louise Patricia Dolan Katary was born 11 October 1946.

Her 1976 PhD thesis was supervised by Ronald J. Williams and focused on land tenure during the Ramesside period based on her study of the Wilbour papyrus and other written documentary traces from the period. She had previously completed a bachelor's degree in Religious Thought from the University of Pennsylvania and an master's thesis at the University of Toronto's Department of Near Eastern Studies. Her thesis employed the use of applied statistics and computer programming (specifically SPSS) to the establish a methodology to extract and analyze socio-economic data from ancient texts.

Dr. Katary taught Classical Studies, including Egyptology courses, at Thorneloe University, an affiliated college of Laurentian University for over thirty years. She was a founding member of the Canadian Society for the Study of Egyptian Antiquities and served as an associate editor of the society's academic journal, The Journal of the Society for the Study of Egyptian Antiquities.

She died unexpectedly on 6 August 2016. Following her death a memorial lecture was established by the SSEA.

== Selected bibliography ==
- Katary, Sally L. D., "The administration of institutional agriculture in the new kingdom." Ancient Egyptian Administration. Edited by Juan Carlos Moreno Garcia. Leiden: Brill, 2013.
- Katary, Sally L. D., "Teen Land Tenure and Taxation," The Egyptian World. Edited by Toby Wilkinson. London: Routledge, 2007. pp. 185–201.
- Katary, Sally L. D., "Land-Tenure in the New Kingdom: The Role of Women Smallholders and the Military." Agriculture in Egypt: from pharaonic to modern times. Edited by Alan K. Bowman, Eugene L. Rogan. Oxford: Oxford University Press, 1999.
- Katary, Sally. Land tenure in the Ramesside period. New York: Kegan Paul, 1989.
- Katary, Sally Louise D. Land tenure in the Ramesside period: A reconsideration of the Wilbour papyrus and related documents. PhD Thesis, University of Toronto, 1977.
