= William Landles =

Scottish sculptor

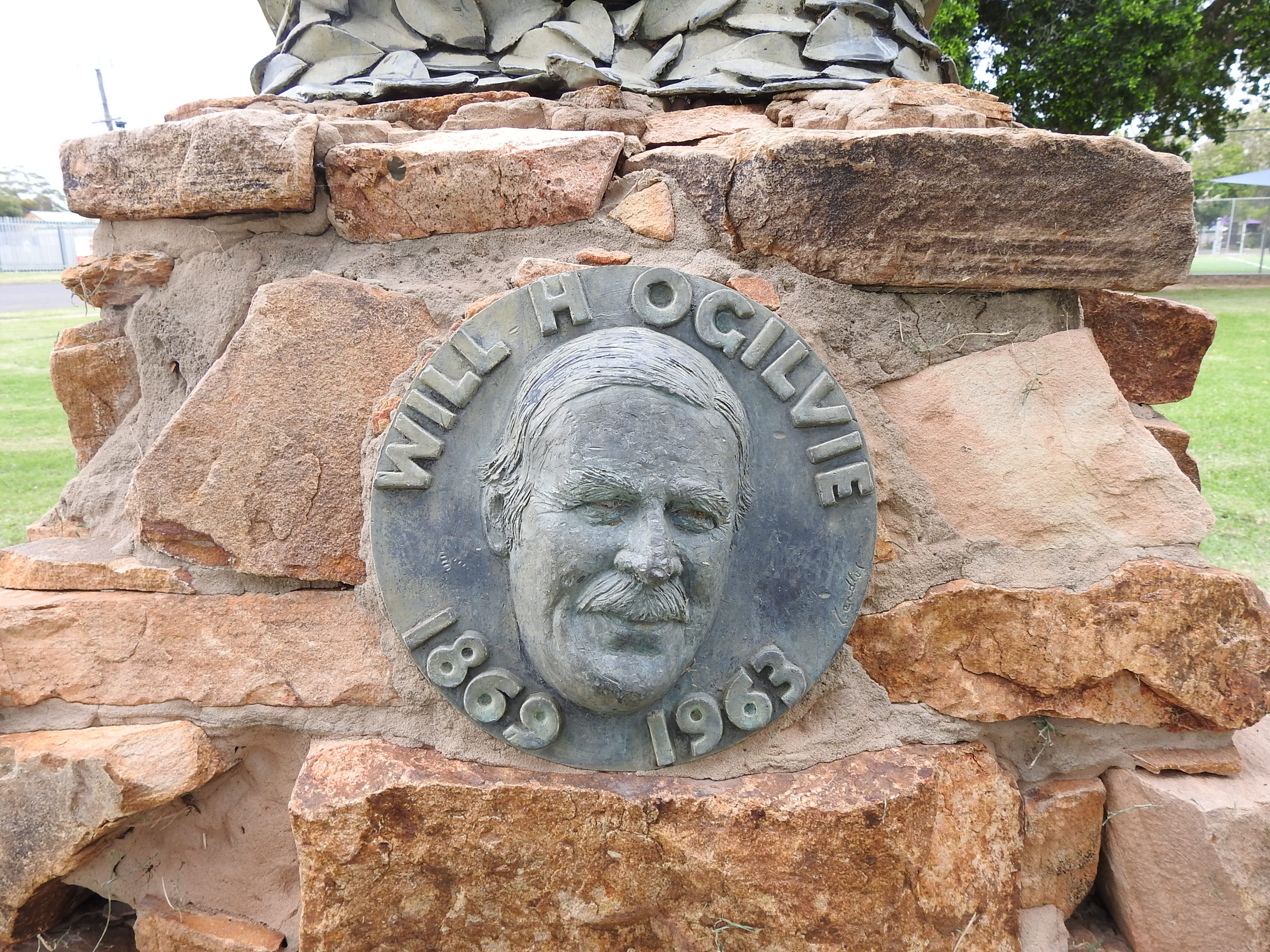
Bronze sculpture of Will H. Ogilvie, at Bourke, NSW, Australia (2021).

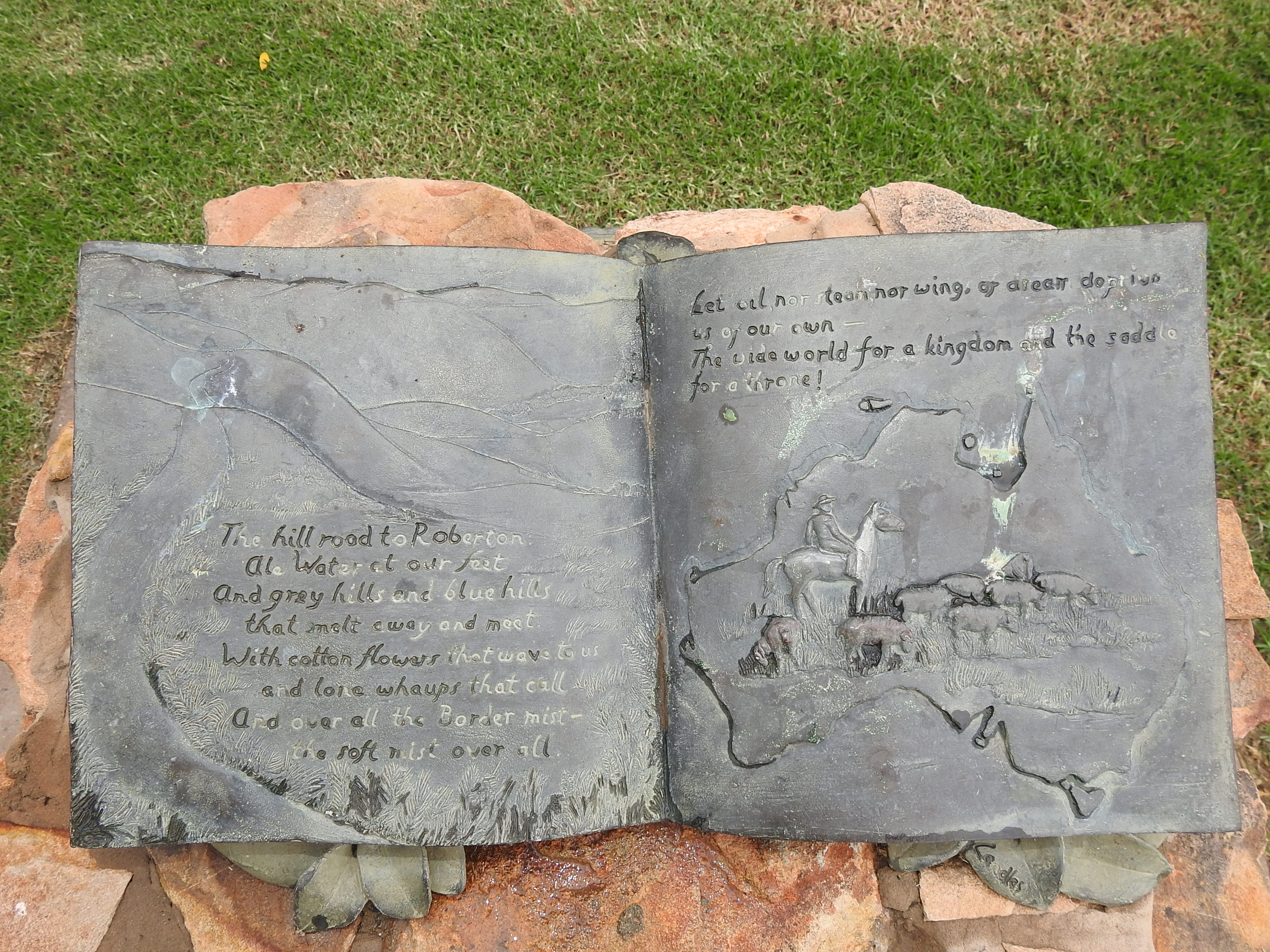
Ogilvie bronze book sculpture at Bourke, NSW, Australia (2021).

William Landles (25 November 1923 – 17 August 2016) was a Scottish artist and sculptor from the Scottish Borders town of Hawick.

Born in Hawick he left school at the age of fourteen to start an apprenticeship as a grocer. A self-taught sculptor, he was noticed and mentored by the renowned Scottish artist Anne Redpath, whom he remained friends with for the rest of her life. She and others encouraged Landles and he won a scholarship to study at the Edinburgh College of Art in the early 1950s. He went on to qualify in teaching and became a school master in Art at Hawick High School until his retirement in 1980.

Two of his public sculptures are situated in his home town of Hawick, including the iconic portrait of poet James Thomson on the Thompson Bridge. Landles was responsible for the bronzes used in the Roberton and Bourke cairns of Scottish Border poet and Australian bush balladeer Will H. Ogilvie (1869–1963). His work has been exhibited repeatedly at the Scottish Royal Academy, in exhibitions across Scotland and is in private collections around the world.

William Landles died on 17 August 2016, aged 92, and is buried in Hawick.
