= Yunus Jaffery =

Indian writer and translator (1930–2016)

S.M. Yunus Jaffery (1930 – 29 August 2016) was an Indian scholar of the Persian language. He was from Delhi, India.

He is mentioned in writer William Dalrymple’s 1994 book, City of Djinns.

He was given the Farabi International Award, a literary prize, in 2006 by the Iran government for his work towards the Persian language.

Jaffery had written short stories in Urdu and Hindi as well, apart from his work in Persian language. He had translated Hindu epic Ramayana to Persian, and edited, transcribed historical books like Shah Jehan Nama to clear Persian script. He was well versed with culture and norms of Mughal times, along with his Persian writing.

He attended Delhi College (now Zakir Hussain College, Delhi University) for his graduate studies and later taught there. He had also studied Persian studies in University of Tehran in 1960s. In 1995, he retired from Zakir Hussain College, Delhi as dean of Persian studies.

Jaffery died on 29 August 2016 in Delhi.
