= Gregory P. Schmidt =

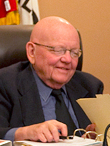
- Schmidt in 2014

Secretary of the California State Senate
- In office August 31, 1996 – October 2014
- Preceded by: John W. Rovane
- Succeeded by: Daniel Alvarez

Personal details
- Born: May 3, 1947 Oakland, California
- Died: August 24, 2016 (aged 69) Citrus Heights, California
- Education: University of Santa Clara; University of California, Berkeley
- Occupation: Public Administrator

Gregory P. Schmidt (May 3, 1947 – August 24, 2016) was an American who was the Secretary of the California State Senate from August 1996 until October 2014, serving concurrently as the Chief Executive Officer for the California Senate Rules Committee.

Earlier in his career, Schmidt served as a consultant to Assembly Committees on Human Resources; Labor, Employment and Consumer Affairs, and later as Staff Director to the State Senate Committee on Judiciary. He received his bachelor's degree from Santa Clara University in 1969 and his master's degree in history from the University of California, Berkeley in 1973. He retired as Secretary of the Senate in 2014 while he was being investigated of nepotism as his son, daughter-in-law and nephew all had jobs in the Senate.

Schmidt died of cancer on August 24, 2016, at the age of 69.
