= Eddy Silitonga =

Indonesian singer (1949–2016)

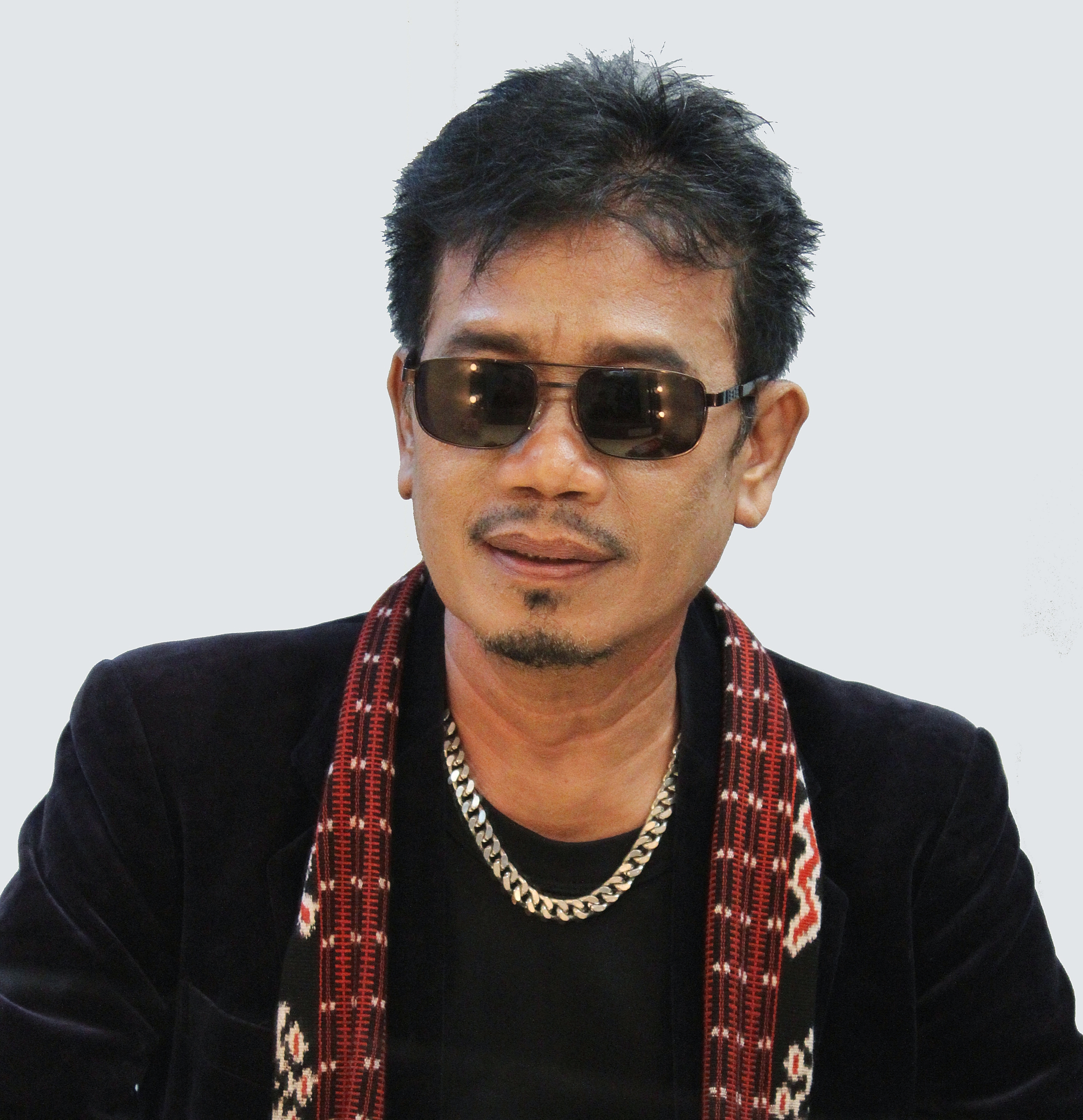

Background information
- Born: Charles Edison Silitonga; January 17, 1949; Pematangsiantar, North Sumatra, Indonesia
- Died: August 25, 2016 (aged 67) Jakarta, Indonesia
- Genres: Pop
- Occupation: Singer
- Years active: 1962–2016

Eddy Silitonga (January 17, 1949 – August 25, 2016) was an Indonesian singer. He was known for his high-pitched voice. He won several song contests, including Champion Pop Singer in Medan and the Popular Song Festival held at Taman Ismail Marzuki in Jakarta. Silitonga won the first Minang Song Contest in 1983. He studied at Mapua Institute of Technology in the Philippines. He formed his own group, "Eddy's Group", which was at its peak in 1976 – 1979.

Some of his popular songs included "Bunga Tanjong", "Lancang Kuning", "Bunga Pujaan", and "Jatuh Cinta".
