= Harold Kalina =

American politician

Harold Kalina (July 2, 1928 – August 15, 2016) was an American lawyer, judge, and politician.

Born in Minneapolis, Minnesota, Kalina went to the Minneapolis public schools. He served in the United States Army. Kalina graduated from the University of Minnesota in 1949 and received his law degree from the University of Minnesota Law School in 1953. He practiced law in Minneapolis. From 1955 to 1972, Kalina served in the Minnesota Senate. He then served as a Minnesota District Court judge from 1972 to 1983 and from 1990 to 1995. Kalina died in Minneapolis, Minnesota.
