= Barendra Krushna Dhal =

Indian Odia writer and journalist

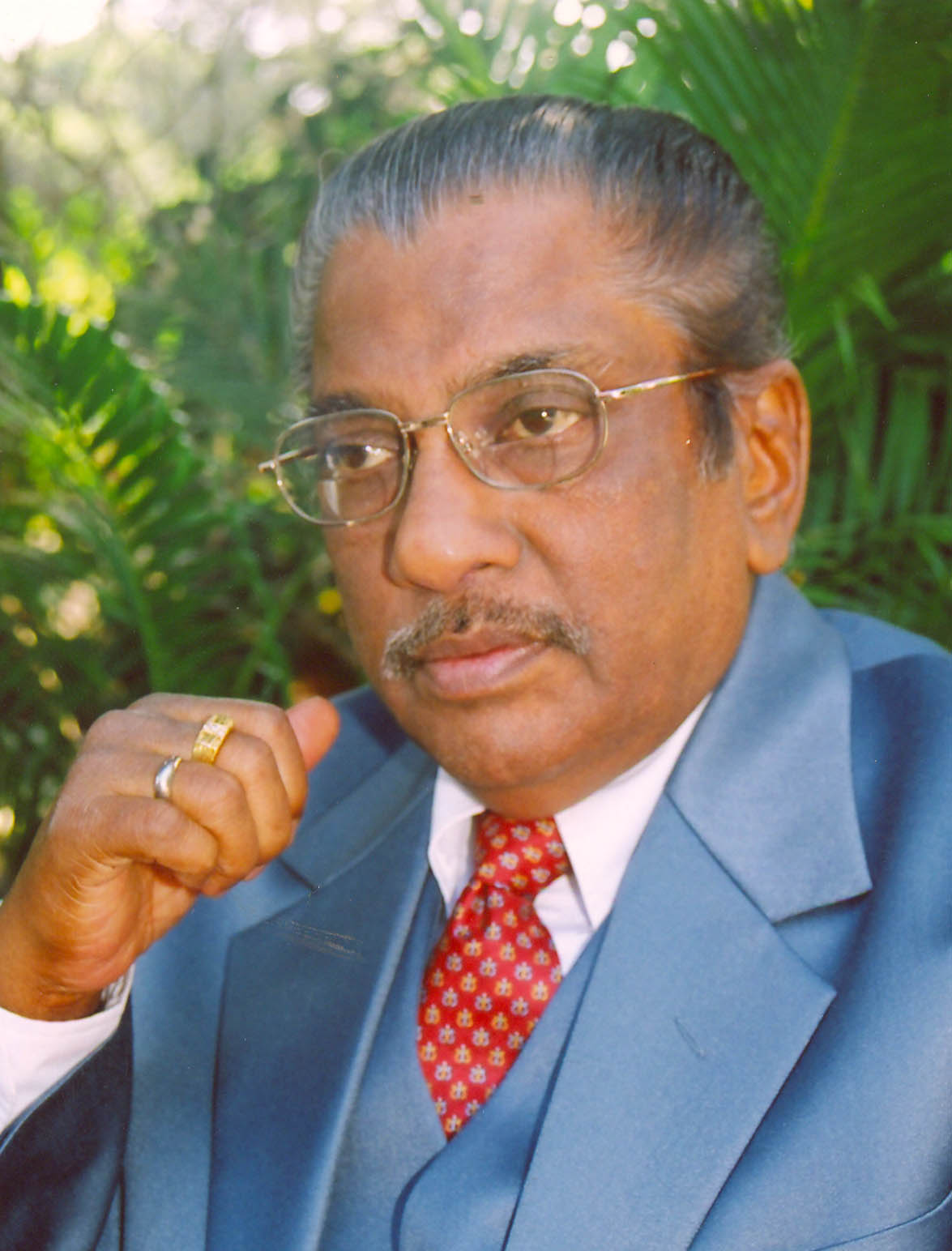
Barendra Krushna Dhal

Barendra Krushna Dhal (17 March 1939 – 9 August 2016) was an Indian Odia journalist and litterateur. He was born in Charchika in the Cuttack district of Odisha, India. He was associated with newspapers like Swaraj, Aj Kal, Sambad and Prajatantra. Dhal led the Lekhaka Samukhya literary movement in the remote areas of Odisha, where he worked as chief secretary during 1982–88. He was the chairman of National Union of Journalists during 1990–93. He founded the Bhubaneswar Book Fair, held annually.

After prolonged illness, Dhal died on 9 August 2016 at the age of 77 in his Bhubaneswar residence.
