= Liu Dajun =

Chinese agronomist (1926–2016)

- 刘大钧
- Born: 2 July 1926; Changzhou, Jiangsu, China
- Died: 22 August 2016 (aged 90); Nanjing, Jiangsu, China
- Education: University of Nanking; Moscow Timiryazev Agricultural Academy
- Scientific career
- Fields: Agricultural science

Liu Dajun (Chinese: 刘大钧; pinyin: Liú Dàjūn; 2 July 1926 – 22 August 2016) was a Chinese agronomist, educator and an academician of the Chinese Academy of Engineering (CAE).

== Biography ==
Liu graduated from University of Nanking in 1949, majoring in agronomy. He became a teaching assistant at University of Nanking. He moved to Moscow Timiryazev Agricultural Academy by government study abroad scholarship in 1955 and earned his master's degree in 1959. Liu returned to China and taught at Nanjing Agricultural University. His research area was wheat genetics and breeding. He was the President of Nanjing Agricultural University between 1983 and 1991. He was elected an academician of the Chinese Academy of Engineering in 1999.

Liu died on 22 August 2016 at the age of 90 in Nanjing.
