= Craven C. Rogers Jr. =

United States Air Force general

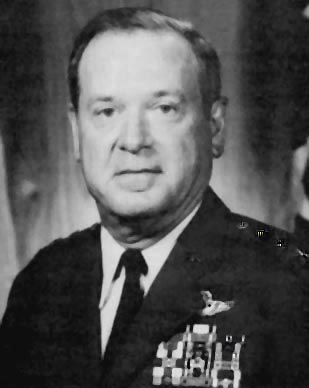
- Born: September 16, 1934; Galveston, Texas, U.S.
- Died: August 4, 2016 (aged 81); Tampa, Florida, U.S.
- Military career
- Allegiance: United States
- Branch: United States Air Force
- Service years: 1957–1991
- Rank: Lieutenant General
- Awards: Defense Distinguished Service Medal with oak leaf cluster, Distinguished Service Medal, Legion of Merit with two oak leaf clusters, Distinguished Flying Cross with oak leaf cluster, Bronze Star Medal, Meritorious Service Medal with oak leaf cluster, Air Medal with 13 oak leaf clusters, Air Force Commendation Medal, Korean Order of National Security Merit (Chunsu) and Korean Order of National Security Merit (Kuksun)

Craven C. Rogers Jr. (September 16, 1934 – August 4, 2016) was a lieutenant general in the United States Air Force who served as deputy commander in chief of the U.S. Central Command at MacDill Air Force Base, Florida. The command was tasked with achieving United States national objectives in Southwest Asia, the Persian Gulf, and the Horn of Africa. Rogers was born in 1934, in Galveston, Texas. He earned a Bachelor of Science degree in engineering from the U.S. Military Academy in 1957 and a master's degree in business administration from The George Washington University. He completed Squadron Officer School in 1962 and the Industrial College of the Armed Forces in 1973. Upon graduation from the academy he was commissioned as a second lieutenant in the Air Force. After completing pilot training in September 1958 he was assigned to Tactical Air Command at Williams Air Force Base, Ariz., for gunnery training in the F-86F. With the phaseout of the F-86F, Rogers transferred in June 1959 as an instructor pilot to Air Training Command, Vance Air Force Base, Oklahoma. He completed F-101A transition training in September 1964 and then was assigned as a tactical fighter pilot with the 91st Tactical Fighter Squadron, Royal Air Force Station Bentwaters, England. In 1965 his squadron became the first unit in the United States Air Forces in Europe to transition to the F-4. Rogers assumed duties in the Standardization and Evaluation Section of the 81st Tactical Fighter Wing at Bentwaters in November 1966. In September 1967 he transferred to Nellis Air Force Base, Nevada, where he completed the F-4 Fighter Weapons School. In January 1968 he was assigned to the 557th Tactical Fighter Squadron, 12th Tactical Fighter Wing, Cam Ranh Bay Air Base, South Vietnam, as a flight commander and squadron weapons officer. He subsequently served as the wing weapons officer and assistant chief of weapons and tactics for 12th Tactical Fighter Wing. He flew 255 combat missions and 435 combat flying hours in the F-4C. He returned from Southeast Asia in February 1969 and was assigned to the Fighter and Reconnaissance Manning Section, Air Force Military Personnel Center, Randolph Air Force Base, Texas. He became chief of the section in 1971. Upon graduation from the Industrial College of the Armed Forces in August 1973, Rogers became deputy commander for operations, 1st Tactical Fighter Wing, MacDill Air Force Base, Florida. In June 1975 he transferred to Headquarters United States Air Force, Washington, D.C., as chief, Tactical Division, Directorate of Operational Requirements, Office of the Deputy Chief of Staff, Research and Development. In July 1977 Rogers was assigned as vice commander of the 4th Tactical Fighter Wing, Seymour Johnson Air Force Base, North Carolina. In June 1978 he became commander of the wing. He returned to Air Force headquarters in July 1980 and served as military assistant to the secretary of the Air Force. From June 1983 to July 1985 he was commander of United States Air Forces Korea; commander, United Nations Command Air Component; and commander, 314th Air Division, with headquarters at Osan Air Base, South Korea. He also was commander of the Korean Air Defense Sector, director of readiness and combat operations, and chief of staff of the Air Component Command/Combined Forces Command. Rogers then transferred to Hickam Air Force Base, Hawaii, as vice commander in chief, Pacific Air Forces. In December 1986 Rogers returned to Osan Air Base as commander, 7th Air Force; deputy commanding general, U.S. Forces Korea (Seoul); and deputy commander in chief, United Nations Command (Seoul). He is a command pilot with 5,200 flying hours. His military awards and decorations include the Defense Distinguished Service Medal with oak leaf cluster, Distinguished Service Medal, Legion of Merit with two oak leaf clusters, Distinguished Flying Cross with oak leaf cluster, Bronze Star Medal, Meritorious Service Medal with oak leaf cluster, Air Medal with 13 oak leaf clusters, Air Force Commendation Medal, Korean Order of National Security Merit (Chunsu) and Korean Order of National Security Merit (Kuksun). He was promoted to lieutenant general January 1, 1987, with same date of rank. He retired on April 1, 1991, and died on August 4, 2016.
