= Joellyn Duesberry =

American landscape painter (1944–2016)

Joellyn Toler Duesberry
- Born: June 30, 1944; Richmond, Virginia, U.S.
- Died: August 5, 2016 (aged 72)
- Education: Smith College (BA); New York University Institute of Fine Arts
- Occupation: Landscape artist

Joellyn Toler Duesberry (June 30, 1944 – August 5, 2016) was a landscape artist who worked in oils.

She said that her paintings echo the work of John Marin and Milton Avery. Of her art, Duesberry said, "I am not interested in a realist painting, I am not interested in an abstract painting. I am interested in the tension."

== Early life and education ==
Joellyn Toler Duesberry was born on June 30, 1944, in Richmond, Virginia. Growing up in rural Virginia instilled in her a love for the land. She said, "All my life I think I've unconsciously tried to re-create the place where bliss or terror first came to me. Both emotions seemed so strong that I had to locate them outside of myself, in the land. This goes back to a childhood habit--of living in rural Virginia and seeking woods and creeks and lakes for solitary refuge; places where I could sketch and paint." She decided to start painting at age ten after being given a pair of red tennis shoes and walking on the beach, inspired by the colorful juxtaposition of sand, shadow, and shoe. Soon thereafter she decided that "Women artists existed and she needed to be among them."

She received a BA with Distinction, Phi Beta Kappa, in art history and painting, from Smith College in 1966. In that year she was awarded a Woodrow Wilson Fellowship. While at Smith, she "honed her skills by making countless copies of masterworks." She graduated with a master's degree from New York University Institute of Fine Arts. Despite her degrees, she is considered to be a self-taught artist.

== Work ==
Duesberry was a plein air painter, who began "her canvases outdoors on an easel and finish[ed] them in the studio, frequently making monotypes in between."

She moved to Denver in 1985, and embraced the Colorado landscape in her art. In that year she received an Individual Painting Grant from the National Endowment for the Arts to work with Richard Diebenkorn.

In 1997, Duesberry won the Benjamin Altman Landscape Prize from the National Academy of Design. While she had a World Views residency with the Lower Manhattan Cultural Council (LMCC) from 1998-1999, Duesberry painted city studies in studio space in some vacant offices of the World Trade Center's North Tower. She says that, because of her connection to the World Trade Center, the tone of her painting saddened after 9/11.

In 2005, a PBS documentary was made of Joellyn Duesberry's life, work, and creative process titled Joellyn Duesberry: Dialogue with the Artist.

Her works are held by institutions such as Metropolitan Museum of Art and Smith College Museum of Art.

== Publications ==
- 1998: A Covenant of Seasons: Monotypes by Joellyn T. Duesberry, Poetry by Pattiann Rogers, ISBN 1555951562
- 2011: Elevated Perspective: The Paintings of Joellyn Duesberry, ISBN 978-0983368502

== Personal life ==
In 1984, Duesberry met Dr. Ira Kowal, a Denver cardiologist, while at a dinner party in Vail. They married in 1986 and lived in Greenwood Village, Colorado. She died of pancreatic cancer on August 5, 2016.
