= Ted Banks =

American track and field coach

Theodore H. Banks Jr. (May 31, 1934 – August 25, 2016) was an American track and field coach who won an unprecedented seventeen NCAA championships in indoor track and field, outdoor track and field, and cross country for the University of Texas at El Paso (UTEP) from 1975 to 1981. He previously coached at San Jose State Spartans and Long Beach State.
