= Erkin Alymbekov =

Kyrgyz politician (1961–2016)

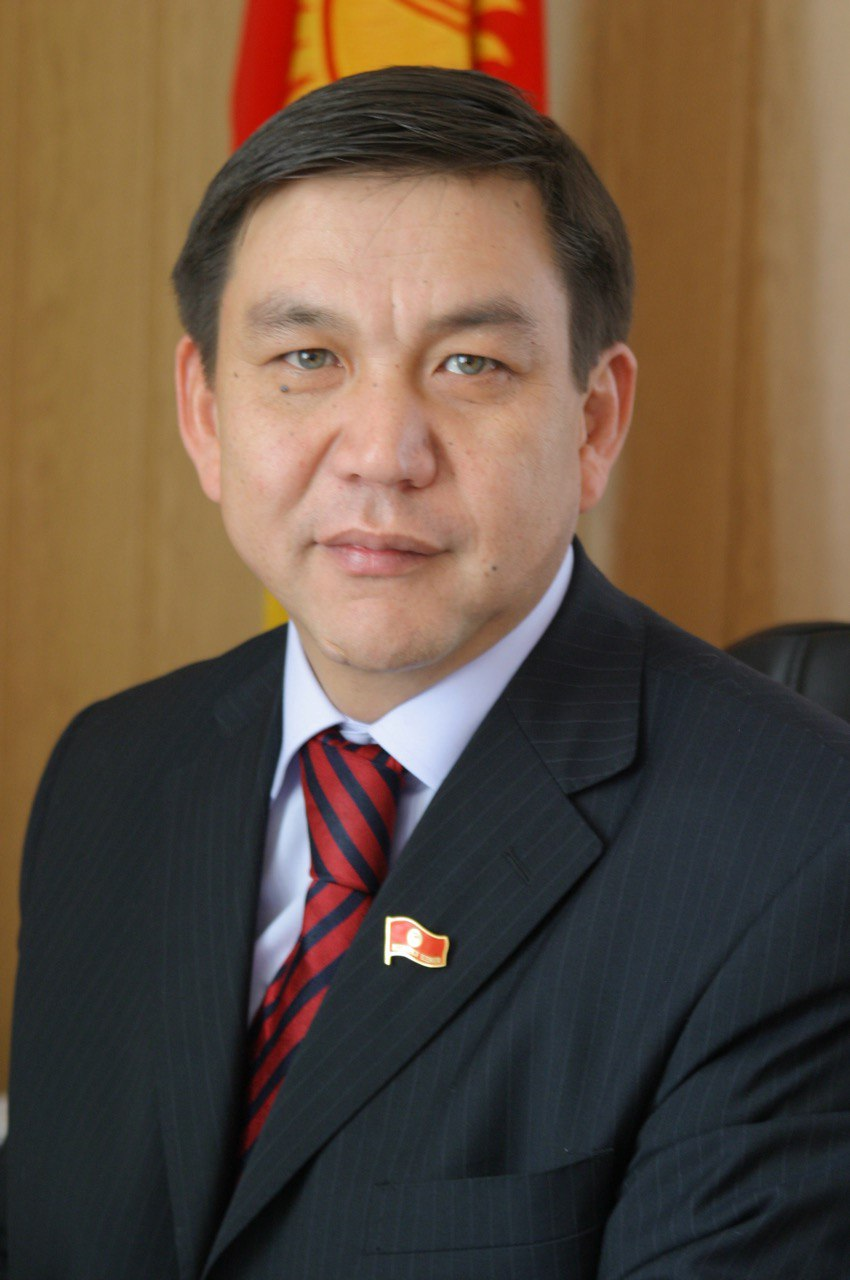

Member of the Supreme Council
- In office 2005–2007
- In office 2010–2014

Personal details
- Born: 5 November 1961 Zhany-Aryk, Kirghiz SSR, Soviet Union
- Died: 29 August 2016 (aged 54)
- Party: Ata Meken Socialist Party

Erkin Dzhumabaevich Alymbekov (Russian: Эркинбек Джумабаевич Алымбеков; 5 November 1961 – 29 August 2016), also spelled as Erkinbek Alymbekov, was a Kyrgyz politician. He was a member of the Supreme Council of Kyrgyzstan from 2005 until 2007 and from 2010 until his resignation in 2014. He resigned in protest of the government's decision to work with a Canadian company on the Kumtor Gold Mine. In his second term, he was a member of the Ata Meken Socialist Party and was a deputy speaker.

Alymbekov was the chairman of the Human Rights Committee of Parliament, and was a member of Kyrgyzstan's Human Rights Advisory Board. He was also a significant regional partner of the Danish Institute for Human Rights.

He died of sudden cardiac arrest on 29 August 2016, aged 54.
