= James Hinesly =

Canadian football player (born 1933)

Profile
- Position: End

Personal information
- Born: December 11, 1933 (age 92); Detroit, Michigan, U.S.
- Listed height: 6 ft 1 in (1.85 m)
- Listed weight: 195 lb (88 kg)

Career history
- 1957: Hamilton Tiger-Cats

Awards and highlights
- Grey Cup champion (1957)

James Arturo Hinesly (December 11, 1933 – August 31, 2016) was an American professional football player who played for the Hamilton Tiger-Cats. He won the Grey Cup with them in 1957. He played college football at Michigan State University.
