= Baba Ould Cheikh =

Malian drug trafficker

- Born: ~1965
- Citizenship: Malian
- Occupation: Drug trafficker
- Known for: Air Cocaine scandal, ties to jihadist groups
- Children: Mimi Ould Baba

Baba Ould Cheikh is a Lemhar Arab Malian drug trafficker with close ties to jihadist groups.

== Biography ==
Cheikh was born around 1965. Little is known about his early life. During his time as the mayor of Tarkint, Cheikh managed two construction companies in Gao in the early 2000s. His fleet of trucks illegally imported consumer products from Algeria along with cocaine. Cheikh was at the forefront of the "Air Cocaine" scandal in 2009. He was also in close contact with Al-Qaeda in the Islamic Maghreb (AQIM), in particular regarding negotiations for European hostages kidnapped in Algeria in 2003, and later on the kidnapping of Robert Fowler. In negotiations for Fowler, Cheikh put special advisor to the Burkinabe president Moustapha Ould Limam Chafi in contact with AQIM emir Mokhtar Belmokhtar. Cheikh was also suspected of having links to Fowler's kidnappers.

On February 3, 2013, a few days after Malian forces recaptured Gao from jihadists, Cheikh was violent attacked by a group of young men who had seen him at the bus station with armed men. Cheikh, who had impunity in Gao for years prior, was arrested by Malian troops with Cheikh's friend and mayor of Gao Sadou Harouna Diallo not intervening in his arrest. A warrant was issued for Cheikh's arrest, and he was arrested on April 10 for drug trafficking.

Cheikh was arrested again on January 21, 2018, by unknown armed men, but he was released that February.

== Personal life ==
Cheikh is the father of Mimi Ould Baba, who was arrested in Mali in January 2017 and accused of being a key figure behind the 2016 Ouagadougou attacks, which left thirty people dead at the request of Abu Hassan al-Ansari. Baba also was a mastermind behind the Grand-Bassam shootings in Côte d'Ivoire. He was charged for the murder of a US citizen in 2020.
