= International Human Rights competition for lawyers =

International pleading competition

The International Human Rights competition for lawyers is an annual pleading contest held at the Mémorial de Caen (France), near the D-Day landing beaches.

== Presentation ==
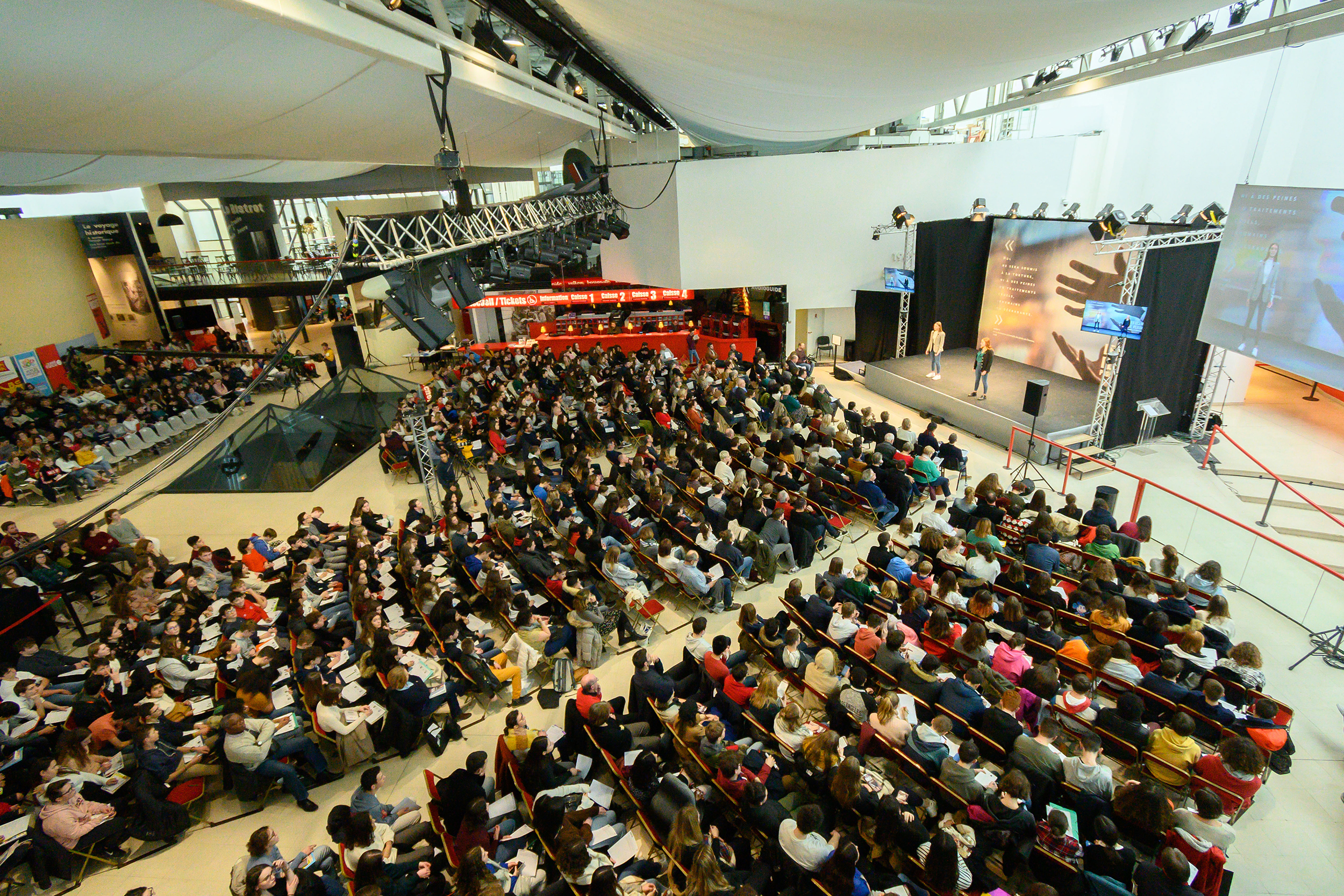
Competition final in 2020.

This international competition for lawyers has been running since 1989. Ten lawyers from all over the world present and defend an individual case of human rights violation before a jury of public figures. The competition was the brainchild of the President of the Caen Bar, Bernard Blanchard. Every year, the event attracts several hundred spectators.

The competition is organized in partnership by the National Council of French Bars, the Caen Bar, the Conference of Presidents of the Bar, the Paris Bar, the International Union of Lawyers and the National Federation of Young Lawyers.

For over thirty years, more than a thousand candidate lawyers from over 80 countries have come to the Caen Memorial to denounce a real, individual case of human rights violation.

The jury includes lawyers, politicians, journalists, and diplomats, such as Leïla Aslaoui, Boutros Boutros-Ghali, Abdou Diouf, Barbara Hendricks, Stéphane Hessel, Hauwa Ibrahim, Abraham Serfaty, Christiane Taubira...

In addition to the pleading competition reserved for lawyers, the Caen Memorial has also organized a pleading competition since 2011 for student lawyers, as well as a competition for high-school students co-organized with Amnesty International, the first prize of which is a visit to the United Nations in New York. Since 2008, the International Human Rights Competition for lawyers has supported the Al-Quds University Peace Moot Court Competition in Jerusalem.

== Impact of the competition on pleaded cases ==
Since its inception, the competition follows up the cases that are presented and pleaded. In fact, a follow-up committee has been set up to ensure that cases are dealt with on an ongoing basis, and to act in favor of the person defended during the competition. As a result, some of the people defended during the competition have been pardoned or released:

For example:

- Sarah Balabagan and Véronique Akobe: pardoned.
- Aboriginal children: official apology from the Australian Prime Minister.
- Amina Lawal: acquitted.
- Raùl Rivero: released.

== Competition winners ==
- 2024: Don de Dieu Nyembo Louis
- 2023: Maryam Meylan
- 2022: Hasna Louze
- 2021: Laura Temin
- 2020: François Bourguignon
- 2019: Etienne Mangeot
- 2018: Antione Chaudey
- 2017: Ashkhen Harutyunan
- 2016: Floria Diana-Martine
- 2015: François Dessy
- 2014: Yasmine Attia
- 2013: Charles Merlen
- 2012: Ophélie Kirsch
- 2011: Mahmoud Arqan
- 2009: Raymond Lesniak
- 2008: Simon Pierre Ngue Bong
- 2004: Laurent Gamet
- 1993: Jean Ouellet

== Works ==
Each year, the Caen Memorial Museum publishes a book listing the winning pleadings. The books are illustrated by cartoonist Emmanuel Chaunu.

== See also ==
- Human rights
- War Memorial of Caen
- World Human Rights Moot Court Competition
