= Battle of Anéfis =

Battle of Anéfis may refer to:

- Battle of Anéfis (May 2013)
- Battle of Anéfis (June 2013)
- Battle of Anéfis (2014)
- 2015 Anéfis dispute
- Battle of Anéfis (2026)
