= Crime in Ivory Coast =

Republic of Côte d'Ivoire République de Côte d'Ivoire (French)
- Flag Coat of arms

- Capital: Yamoussoukro (political); Abidjan (economic); 6°51′N 5°18′W
- Largest city: Abidjan
- Official languages: French

Population
  - 2018 estimate: 23,740,424. (54th)
  - Density: 63.9/km^{2} (165.5/sq mi) (139th)
- GDP (PPP): 2020 estimate
  - Total: $126.863 billion
  - Per capita: $4,705
- ISO 3166 code: CI

Crime in Côte d'Ivoire is prevalent and versatile across the West African country. The most common forms of crime include child labour, arms trafficking, terrorism and human rights abuse. Other less common, but still evident types of crime include cannabis and synthetic drug trade, sex trafficking, fauna and flora crimes, cybercrime.

The European Union funded Enhancing Africa's Response to Transnational Organised Crime (ENACT) programme created a ten-point index score based on national criminality and resilience to crime. Côte d'Ivoire has the fourth highest Criminality Score (6.23) in Africa and the second highest Criminality Score in West Africa, after Nigeria (7.70). Ivory Coast is part of the 37% of countries in Africa that have a high crime, but a low resilience to crime index score along with Egypt, Tanzania, Sudan and the Democratic Republic of Congo.

Embedded actors throughout the state and political corruption prevents progress in reducing crime rates. Many initiatives have been taken to reduce crime, especially in arms trafficking and child labour, by organisations such and the United Nations and UNICEF.

== Organised crime ==
Organised crime Africa - Côte d'Ivoire 2019 African rankings
	Overall crime	Criminal markets	Criminal actors	Resilience to crime
Rank	#8	#4	#12	#19
Index score	6.23	5.95	6.50	4.54

== Trafficking ==
=== Child labour ===
Ivory Coast is a major trafficking hub for important and export of child labourers. Children below the minimum working age of 16 often work in agriculture, mining, domestic work and sex work. Girls most commonly work as domestic servants, while boys perform forced labour on cocoa and coffee farms where they are exploited and abused.

By law, children must attend school from the ages of 6 to 16. However, children are often kidnapped, sold into slavery by their families or trafficked from poorer neighbouring countries such as Burkina Faso and Mali to more affluent areas of Ivory Coast. A major cause of child labour in Côte d'Ivoire is lack of education; parents sell their children into work instead of allowing them to attend school, restricting them from an education.

Children ages 5–14 in Ivory Coast - work and education
Children	%	Population
Working	31.5%	1,682,754
Attending school	63.5%	---
Working and attending school	21.5	---

Previously, trafficking children between the war-torn borders of Ivory Coast had been easy, as there was little surveillance. The decrease in violence between the neighbouring nations has allowed countries to work together to better prevent trafficking between countries.

In the last decade, projects including U.S. Department of Labor funded projects and World Cocoa Foundation's Cocoa Action have aimed to eliminate child labour in Ivory Coast and other African countries. UNICEF and their partners aimed to aid victims, form partnerships with the Ivorian government and increase law enforcement to aid the problem.

In 2018, Ivory Coast improved their efforts to eliminate child labour. The government drafted a National Labour Inspection Strategy, as well as developed a 3-year National Action Plan to fight child labour. The Minister of Interior and Security passed a law making trafficking of migrants illegal. In addition, the First Lady of the Ivory Coast, with the help of many Non-governmental organizations, opened child protection centres for rescued victims of child labour, where they receive housing, education, counselling, medical attention and vocational training.

In 2019, the criminal law enforcement upped their action. They trained 33 labour inspectors to investigate, prosecute and convict child labour traffickers. Training for criminal inspectors and financial still lack for the 8.5 million workers in Ivory Coast. However, the small increase in trained inspectors has allowed hundreds of children to be rescued from forced labour. The U.S. Embassy in Ivory Coast also made the following prioritised recommendations to the government to further improve the trafficking situation:

- Further train law enforcement and judicial official to effectively investigate, prosecute and convict trafficking cases in accordance to the 2016 trafficking laws
- Increase funding for non-government organisations supporting child protection centres
- Increase funding for anti-trafficking police units
- Revise existing identification procedures for child labour and trafficking victims
- Improve data collection in regards to child labour of all sorts

==== Cocoa production ====
The most common form of child labour in Ivory Coast occurs on cocoa farms. It produce 2/5 of the world's cocoa and receives 60% of their revenue from cocoa crops. 2.1 million children in West Africa, including Ivory Coast, work in dangerous conditions harvesting cocoa. Children, usually boys, work to burn and clear fields, cut down trees, spray pesticides and use sharp tools to break open cocoa pods - all of which are determined to be hazardous activities by national law or regulation. They are often beaten if they work too slowly or try to escape.

=== Arms trafficking ===
Côte d'Ivoire is a common cross border trafficking hub for smuggling legal and illegal small arms between countries. Major routes for arms trafficking occur at two tri-borders. The first arises between Burkina Faso, Ivory Coast and Mali, while the other involves the borders of Ghana, Burkina Faso and Ivory Coast. Weapons seized in various countries including Burkina Faso, northern Nigeria and central Mali can be traced back to stocks originating from Ivory Coast. Other routes for arms trafficking occur between Côte d'Ivoire and Liberia.

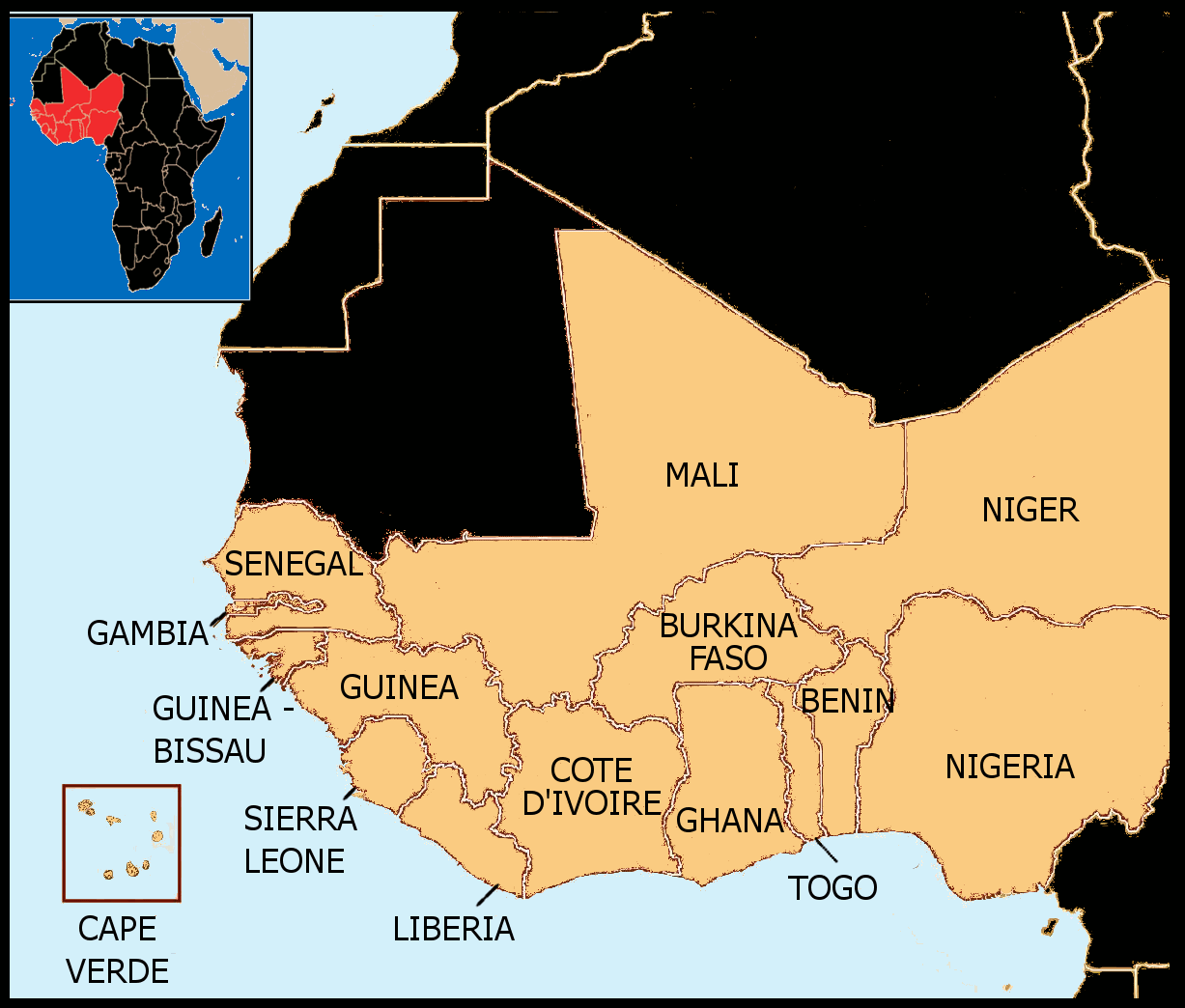
Geopolitical States of West Africa; * Benin * Burkina Faso * Cape Verde * Ivory Coast * The Gambia / * Ghana * Guinea * Guinea-Bissau * Liberia * Mali / * Niger * Nigeria * Senegal * Sierra Leone * Togo

Major actors in small arms trafficking include low level transporters, members from regional and capital trafficking hubs and government forces. Low level transporters do not usually belong to larger trafficking groups. They often travel unarmed on motorbikes through unmanned and uncontrolled border crossings carrying small amounts of illegal arms. Organised trafficking rings involving members from capital and regional trafficking hubs control the lower level transporters and inform about routes the transporters should take when moving goods from one location to another. Government forces have the ability to rent and divert military-grade weapons, such as AK-pattern assault rifles, to outlawed and illegitimate users. Other actors involved in the illicit transport of small arms include criminals, tribal networks and corrupt political officials.

Arms trafficking can be seen as a valid and appropriate career for demobilised fighters, as it provides an opportunity to extricate oneself from unemployment. Such workers are dependent on connections and communication from cross border friendships, family and ethnic ties about movement of security forces.

High-profile individuals and groups such as terrorist groups and other criminals have the ability to move illegal arms across national borders for their personal use. The terrorist organisation al-Murabitoun trafficked assault rifles through Burkina Faso and Mali into Ivory Coast to be used in the Grand-Bassam shootings in 2016. Kidnapping for ransom and extortion increases the power held by criminals and terrorists to traffic illicit arms.

In 2007, an estimated legal and illegal 400,000 guns were owned by civilians. While in 2017, the estimated total number had increased in 1,049,000. Licit and illicit import of small firearms grosses Côte d'Ivoire an annual $76,182,943.

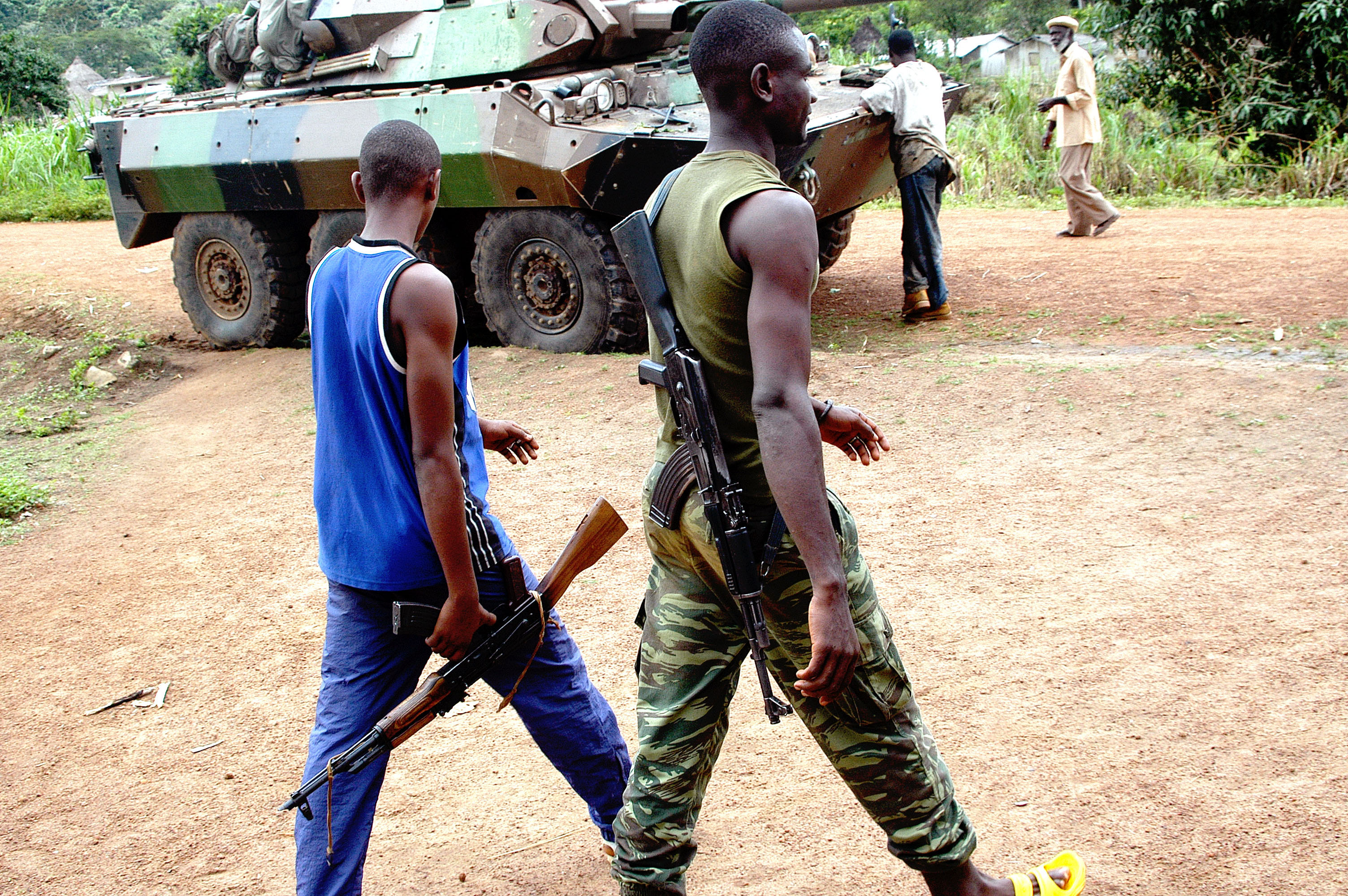
Armed Ivorians next to a French Foreign Legion armoured car, 2004

In 2001, Ivory Coast signed the United Nations Arms Programme of Action (UNPoA) to prevent and eradicate the trade of illegal arms and weapons. Despite this agreement, armed violence persisted across the country. Due to this violence, in 2004 the United Nations places Côte d'Ivoire under an arms embargo, banning the trade of any arms. After the imposed embargo, violence with illegal arms between conflicting parties continued for over a decade. Many violations to the ban occurred, where brokers from France and Belarus provided former authorities with large amounts of firearms and weapons. Armed violence and hostilities escalated post 2011 presidential elections, catalysing human rights abuse in the country. From 2011–2012, Ivory Coast had the highest rate of violent deaths in West Africa, with many deaths perpetrated by large amounts of political tension. Thousands of citizens were killed, based on ethnicity and political affiliation, with illegal weapons. Citizens can form an informant network to report suspicious behaviour of arms trafficking to the government and law enforcement.

=== Sex trafficking ===
Ivory Coast has a prospering sex industry despite the outlawing of sex trafficking according to law No.2016-111. Women and girls from Nigeria are often promised better lives working in restaurants, hairdressers, tailors or massage parlours in Ivory Coast and are trafficked through Benin, Togo, Ghana and Burkina Faso to Ivory Coast. The women and girls are then forced into sex trafficking in order to repay their exorbitant debts of about 1.5-2 million CFA francs (US$3,000-4,000) from the travel to Ivory Coast. The workers receive about 1,000 CFA francs (US$2) per act or 5,000 CFA francs (US$10) per night.

A major concern for Ivory Coast and the sex trafficking industry is the prevalence of HIV/AIDS. It has the 6th highest rate of HIV/AIDS cases in Africa. 50% of the prostitutes in Abidjan are infected with HIV/AIDS. The disease is spread via sexual intercourse without condoms. Even workers aware of the risks associated with unprotected sex face difficulties convincing male clients to use protection, putting them more at risk of being infected with HIV/AIDS if they wish to stay in business.

Ivory Coast, working with neighbouring countries, have increased their efforts to investigate, combat and prosecute sex traffickers and their networks. In 2019, 146 cases were investigated, 56 suspects were prosecuted and 47 sex traffickers were convicted. Law No.2016-111 declared 5–10 years imprisonment and a fine of 5-10 million CFA francs (US$8,790-$17,590) for the conviction of adult sex trafficking and 20–30 years imprisonment and 10-50 million CFA francs (US$17,590-$87,930) fine for those convicted of child sex trafficking.

== Human rights abuses ==
=== 2010/11 post-electoral crisis ===
Leading up to the 2010 election, the country had been largely divided by ethnicity, religion and economy following a large amount of migration from poorer neighbouring countries such Burkina Faso to the relatively prosperous Ivory Coast. President Laurent Gbagbo disliked the level of immigration. Much hostility arose between the northerners and the southwestern civilians, leading to discrimination against the former.

Upon the November 2010 election, it was declared Alassane Ouattara won the election with 54.1% of votes against Gbagbo. However, despite orders from the African Union, European Union and the United Nations, Gbagbo refused to step down from power. Gbagbo claimed polls in northern regions of Ivory Coast to be rigged by pro-Outtara forces. The former president attempted to declare the results as invalid as they were not released before December 1.

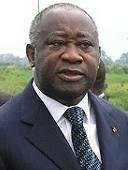
Laurent Gbagbo

Tension rose and violence broke out between Gbagbo and Ouattara loyalists. In particular, there was strong hostility between the southwestern Bété ethnic group Gbagbo supporters and northern Muslim Ouattara supporters. Gbagbo forces and supporters attacked northerners, Muslims, West African immigrants and United Nations staff using weapons such as mortars and heavy machine guns. Ouattara forces burnt villages in the west of Ivory Coast, attacked, raped and killed civilians and Gbagbo supporters during the conflict. Prolonged fighting in Abidjan and surrounding towns prompted the United Nations and French troops to launch air strikes and other military operations on 4 April against Gbagbo and his forces to prevent the use of heavy weapons in the conflict and to protect the civilian population. It is estimated that 3,000 people were declared dead from this conflict, 150 women were raped and over a million civilians were displaced or fled from their home.

On April 10, 2011 United Nations Operations in Côte d'Ivoire, the French military and military forces loyal to Alassane Ouattara arrested Laurent Gbagbo. The International Criminal Court declared Gbagbo and Ouattara to be investigated for multiple accounts of human rights violations upon the failure to protect Ivory Coast's civilians.

In August 2018, President Ouattarra released 800 prisoners involved in the 2010-11 post-electoral crisis, including military officers, former cabinet members and Simone and Laurent Gbagbo. He announced immediate amnesty for those held in custody since the crisis.

The country continues to face economic and discrimination challenges since the events involving human rights abuses.

== Terrorism ==
Ivory Coast is one of several West African countries under Islamist terror threat. In 2016, there were three terrorist related events that took place in West Africa in five months. Due civil war and increased tensions between the predominately Muslim north regions and mainly Christian south regions, threats of terrorism have become an increased concern. Ivory Coast's main terrorist threat is Al-Qaeda in the Islamic Maghreb (AQ-M) and its associated groups, who mainly exercise their power in the Sahel region of West Africa. As a neighbouring country of the Sahel region, Ivory Coast and its northern border area in particular is at particular risk.

=== Grand-Bassam shootings ===
On 13 March 2016 Grand-Bassam attacked by three Islamist gunmen. The mass shooting occurred at a beach resort near L'Etoile du Sud hotel, about 40 km from the country's economic capital Abidjan. 16 people were killed, including four westerners, (French, and German) and two soldiers. The French government collaborated with the Ivorian government to identify and help the victims and their families.

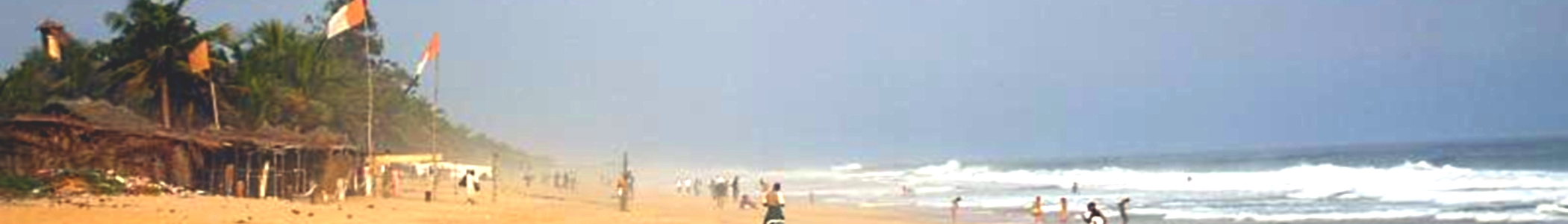
Grand-Bassam beachside

Al-Qaeda in the Islamic Maghreb, partnered with al-Murabitoun claimed responsibility for the attack. The motivation for the attack was reported to be to boost the terrorist group's media profile and to exemplify their recently improved operational capabilities.

After the attack, the flourishing tourism industry at the time was negatively affected. The Ivorian government nominated $1 million to assist the hotel, transport and tourism industry in Grand-Bassam to help compensate for the economic loses caused by the attack. The Ivory Coast's National Security Council also took emergency measures to strengthen security in the country

== See also ==
- Human rights in Ivory Coast
