= Abu Hassan al-Ansari =

Malian jihadist

- Born: Tilemsi, Gao Region, Mali
- Died: February 14, 2018 Inaghalawass, Mali
- Allegiance: al-Mourabitoun (?–2015); Jama'at Nasr al-Islam wal Muslimin (2017–2018)
- Rank: Emir
- Battles / wars: Islamist insurgency in the Sahel: 2016 Ouagadougou attacks; Grand-Bassam shootings; Mali War: Inaghalawass skirmish

Mohamed Ould Nouini, nom de guerre Abu Hassan al-Ansari (also written Abou Hassan al-Ansari) was a Malian jihadist known for perpetrating the 2016 Ouagadougou attacks and the Grand-Bassam attack, along with his high position in Jama'at Nasr al-Islam wal Muslimin.

== Biography ==
al-Ansari was born a Tilemsi Arab from the Tilemsi region of Gao. He is the cousin of Ahmed al-Tilemsi, the founder of the Movement for Oneness and Jihad in West Africa (MOJWA) who was killed in 2014.

al-Ansari is suspected of planning and perpetrating the 2016 Ouagadougou attacks that killed 30 people, and the Grand-Bassam shootings later that year in Ivory Coast. In 2016, he was considered the right-hand man of Mokhtar Belmokhtar, the leader of Al-Qaeda in the Islamic Maghreb (AQIM). al-Ansari also led Al-Mourabitoun in Mali in 2015.

He appeared in the 2017 video that announced the creation of Jama'at Nasr al-Islam wal Muslimin as a merger of five different jihadist groups led by Iyad Ag Ghaly. al-Ansari was killed in the 2018 Inaghalawass skirmish. JNIM retaliated by launching the 2018 Ouagadougou attacks.
