= Nigerians in Ivory Coast =

Nigerian diaspora living in Ivory Coast

Nigerians in Ivory Coast Nigérians en Côte d'Ivoire
- (Nigeria) (Ivory Coast)

Regions with significant populations
- Abidjan (especially Treichville)

Languages
- English (Nigerian English), Igbo, Hausa, Yoruba and other languages of Nigeria; French

Religion
- Predominantly Christianity and Islam

Nigerians in Ivory Coast are the community of people born in the Federal Republic of Nigeria or holders of Nigerian nationality who reside in the Republic of Côte d'Ivoire, two countries in West Africa.

== Background ==
For centuries, migratory movements have taken place between the territories of present-day Nigeria and Ivory Coast, involving particularly nomadic and semi-nomadic groups who moved in search of trade opportunities, pasture, or food resources. During the colonial period, Nigeria and Ivory Coast were administered by different European powers, which shaped their linguistic and cultural landscapes in distinct ways. Nigeria became a British colony, and English was established as the official language, remaining a unifying medium among its diverse ethnic groups after independence in 1960. Ivory Coast, on the other hand, was colonized by the French colonial empire and they established the French West Africa on its territory, where French was adopted as the administrative and educational language, continuing to serve as the country’s official language after independence in 1960. These colonial legacies have significantly influenced communication, education, and governance in both countries, while also affecting patterns of migration and interaction across West Africa.-

== History ==
=== Yoruba people ===
A significant community of Yoruba people resides in Ivory Coast, originating mainly from Ejigbo in Osun State, Nigeria. Historical records indicate that the first wave of migration took place in 1902, when Yoruba settlers established themselves in the Abidjan suburb of Treichville.

=== Hausa people ===
The Hausa people, originally from northern Nigeria and southern Niger, constitute one of the notable ethnic minorities in Ivory Coast. Migration of Hausa traders, clerics, and laborers to the country has taken place over several centuries, contributing to their presence in urban and rural areas. Hausa communities in Ivory Coast are predominantly Muslim and maintain the Hausa language alongside local languages and French. They are active in commerce, agriculture, and artisanal crafts, with traditional occupations including trade in textiles and leather goods, livestock raising, and cereal cultivation. The Hausa community has preserved distinct cultural and religious practices while also integrating into wider Ivorian society.

=== Nigerian Village in Abidjan during the 2023 AFCON ===
The Nigerian Village in Abidjan was a prominent gathering space during the 2023 Africa Cup of Nations (AFCON), held in Ivory Coast. Located in the city center, it served as a focal point for Nigerian football fans and a platform to showcase Nigerian culture and community spirit. Throughout the tournament, the village hosted a variety of cultural, musical, and culinary activities, creating a festive atmosphere that highlighted Nigeria’s rich heritage. In addition to being a place of celebration, it provided logistical support for supporters of the national team, including information on matches and transportation. The Nigerian Village not only strengthened connections among the Nigerian diaspora but also offered Ivorians and other visitors the opportunity to experience Nigerian traditions and hospitality firsthand, becoming a symbol of unity and national pride during the event.

=== Abidjan–Lagos Corridor ===
The Abidjan–Lagos Corridor, a major transnational highway running through five West African countries, has played an important role in facilitating migration and trade between Nigeria and Ivory Coast. The corridor connects Abidjan, the economic capital of Ivory Coast, with Lagos, Nigeria’s largest city, and serves as one of the busiest routes in the region. Its development has encouraged the movement of people, goods, and services across borders, contributing to the growth of the Nigerian community in Ivory Coast. Many Nigerians, particularly traders and entrepreneurs, have used this route to settle in Ivorian cities such as Abidjan, where they participate actively in commerce and cultural exchange.

== Human trafficking ==
Nigerian citizens have been among the victims of human trafficking in Ivory Coast. The majority of those affected are young women, typically between the ages of 13 and 19, who are subjected to sexual slavery. Ivorian authorities have undertaken operations to dismantle international criminal networks engaged in trafficking, leading to the liberation of individuals held in such circumstances. In May 2025, 115 Nigerian nationals were repatriated to Nigeria after being rescued from trafficking in Abidjan.
