= Battle of Anéfis (May 2013) =

Battle of Anefis (May 2013)
- Part of Mali War
Date	May 17–18, 2013
Location	Anefis, Mali
Result	MNLA victory: MAA claims to have captured the city briefly, but is forced to abandon it

Belligerents
MNLA	MAA

Casualties and losses
16 killed (per HCUA); 3 killed (per MNLA)	19 killed (per MNLA)

Between May 17 and 18, 2013, the town of Anéfis, at the time controlled by the MNLA, was attacked by the Arab Movement of Azawad's pro-government faction. The MAA captured the town, but quickly abandoned it. The battle occurred amid high tensions between Kunta Arabs and Lemhar Arabs.

== Prelude ==
The town of Anefis had been held by the MNLA since late January 2013, and the MNLA had around thirty vehicles in the town around that time. On April 24, the MNLA released a statement reporting a clash between the group and MOJWA in Anefis. MNLA spokesman Moussa Ag Attaher stated that MOJWA opened fire on an MNLA checkpoint in the town, causing a skirmish that lasted for a few minutes before the seven jihadists were killed. The Malian government also reported this clash, but claimed it was the MNLA abusing civilians. According to the Malian Army, a young Arab shopkeeper was targeted and shot by the MNLA along with his brothers, and in a separate incident a child was killed for holding a Malian flag.

Clashes then continued the next day between Tilemsi Arabs and Kunta Arabs in Anefis, leaving six dead. These clashes erupted following the battle of Ber, with some of the Tilemsi and Kunta Arabs being tied to the MNLA and Arab Movement of Azawad.

== Battle ==
The MNLA released a statement on May 17 stating that MOJWA fighters had been spotted ten kilometers from Anefis, and the MNLA dispatched fighters to counter it. The MOJWA attack was confirmed by relatives of Anefis residents speaking to the Windsor Star. MNLA spokesman Ibrahim Mohamed Ag Assaleh also stated that the jihadists were neutralized by French airstrikes, but this was not confirmed in the MNLA's press release which stated that the jihadists were able to escape before the airstrikes.

MOJWA released a statement denying involvement in Anefis, with the Arab Movement of Azawad instead claiming responsibility that evening, and also claimed to have captured Anefis in their attack. The Malian Army corroborated the MAA's statements. MISMA stated that Anefis was bombed by French forces on May 18 following the capture of Anefis by the MAA, leading to the city's desertion by the Arabs. The French Army denied involvement at Anefis, however.

The MNLA released another press release on May 21 claiming to have discovered black flags, recordings planning the attack, and more paraphernalia and weaponry indicating MOJWA or jihadist involvement in the attack. They also claimed to have presented the equipment to French forces in Kidal. It is possible both MOJWA and MAA-aligned fighters were involved in the attack, as the battle of Anefis took place amid violent tensions between the MNLA-aligned Kunta Arabs and the Lemhar Arabs, who are aligned with MOJWA or the Arab Movement of Azawad.

== Aftermath ==
The MNLA claimed to have killed nineteen jihadists during the battle, destroying one vehicle and capturing another. They also claimed that three of their fighters were killed, and two were injured. MAA spokesman Mohamed Ould Ramadane stated the MNLA had several casualties, and that eight MNLA vehicles were destroyed. The High Council for the Unity of Azawad stated on May 21 that sixteen MNLA fighters were killed. Four of those killed were relatives of Mohamed Ag Intalla, and two were relatives of Cheikh Ag Aoussa.

By the time Malian forces attacked the city in June, the MNLA was in control of the city again.
