= Human rights in Ivory Coast =

Ivory Coast is a sub-Saharan nation in West Africa. It is a representative presidential democracy where rights are protected in the constitution, international law, and common law. As a member of the African Commission on Human and Peoples' Rights, it is a party to the African Charter on Human and Peoples' Rights and a signatory to major international human-rights agreements. In 2011, the Second Ivorian Civil War saw increases in violence and human-rights abuses. Although progress has been made towards reconciliation, the trial of former first lady Simone Gbagbo (who was acquitted in 2017) suggests that the root causes have not been addressed; no one has been convicted of crimes against humanity. According to a 2018 Human Rights Watch report, "Ongoing indiscipline by members of the security services and violent army mutinies demonstrated the precariousness of the country’s newfound stability."

== Sources of rights ==
=== Constitution ===
Human rights are protected in the 2016 Ivory Coast Constitution's Title 1: Rights, Freedoms and Duties.

- Article 3 protects the right to life.
- Article 4 protects the right against discrimination based on religion, ethnicity, race, opinions, social status or sex.
- Article 5 prohibits slavery, torture, forced labor, genital mutilation and human trafficking.
- Article 6 protects free and equal access to justice.
- Article 7 protects the right to a fair and lawful trial.
- Article 9 protects the right to education and healthcare.
- Article 11 protects the right to own.
- Article 15 protects decent working conditions and fair pay.
- Article 16 protects the rights of child laborers.
- Article 17 protects the right to participate in a trade union.
- Article 19 protects freedom of thought and expression.
- Article 20 protects freedom of association.
- Article 23 protects the right to asylum for anyone fearing persecution on the grounds of religious, political or philosophical convictions.
- Article 24 protects culture and art.

=== International human-rights laws ===
Ivory Coast accepted the jurisdiction of the International Criminal Court in 2003, making the country liable for international human-rights crimes committed after 19 September 2002. It signed and ratified the 2002 Rome Statute of the International Criminal Court on 15 February 2013. Although Ivory Coast has signed some of the major human-rights conventions, it has not yet signed treaties concerning migrant-worker rights, apartheid and forced disappearance (leaving it unaccountable to the United Nations and other countries).

International human-rights treaties
Treaty	Organisation	Introduced	Signed	Ratified
Convention on the Elimination of All Forms of Discrimination Against Women	United Nations	1979	1980	1995
Optional Protocol to the Convention on the Elimination of All Forms of Discrimination against Women	United Nations	1999	-	2012
Convention on the Prevention and Punishment of the Crime of Genocide	United Nations	1948	-	1995
International Convention on the Elimination of All Forms of Racial Discrimination	United Nations	1966	-	1973
International Covenant on Economic, Social and Cultural Rights	United Nations	1966	-	1992
Optional Protocol to the International Covenant on Economic, Social and Cultural Rights (Note: Not ratified)	United Nations	2008	-	-
International Covenant on Civil and Political Rights	United Nations	1966	-	1992
Optional Protocol to the International Covenant on Civil and Political Rights	United Nations	1966	-	1997
International Convention on the Suppression and Punishment of the Crime of Apartheid	United Nations	1973	-	-
Convention on the non-applicability of statutory limitations to war crimes and crimes against humanity	United Nations	1968	-	-
Convention against Torture and Other Cruel, Inhuman or Degrading Treatment or Punishment	United Nations	1984	-	1995
Optional Protocol to the Convention against Torture and Other Cruel, Inhuman or Degrading Treatment or Punishment	United Nations	2002	-	-
International Convention against Apartheid in Sports	United Nations	1985	-	-
Convention on the Rights of the Child	United Nations	1989	1990	1991
Optional Protocol to the Convention on the Rights of the Child on the involvement of children in armed conflict	United Nations	2000	-	2012
Optional Protocol to the Convention on the Rights of the Child on the sale of children, child prostitution and child pornography	United Nations	2000	-	2011
Optional Protocol to the Convention on the Rights of the Child on a communications procedure	United Nations	2011	-	-
Second Optional Protocol to the International Covenant on Civil and Political Rights, aiming at the abolition of the death penalty	United Nations	1989	-	-
International Convention on the Protection of the Rights of All Migrant Workers and Members of their Families	United Nations	1990	-	-
Convention on the Rights of Persons with Disabilities	United Nations	2006	2007	2014
Optional Protocol to the Convention on the Rights of Persons with Disabilities	United Nations	2006	2007	-
International Convention for the Protection of All Persons from Enforced Disappearance	United Nations	2006	-	-

== Issues ==
=== 2010–2011 crisis ===
After the 2010 election, the United Nations-backed Independent Electoral Commission announced that Alassane Ouattara was the president of Ivory Coast. However, Laurent Gbagbo refused to accept the election results and appealed them to the Ivorian Constitutional Council. The council annulled the results; Gbagbo claimed the presidency, triggering political instability and violence. According to Guillaume Ngefa, deputy director of the human-rights division of the United Nations operation in Ivory Coast, at least 462 people died in the violence. Nearly 700,000 Ivorians were displaced.

Ouattara's forces arrested Gbagbo in 2011 and handed him over to the International Criminal Court to face four charges of crimes against humanity, including murder, rape, and persecution. Although human-rights abuses were committed by both sides during the crisis, only Gbagbo's crimes have been investigated by the International Criminal Court.

=== Human trafficking ===
Human trafficking in Ivory Coast is a long-standing problem. Although the country is used for domestic and international trafficking of children and adults, domestic trafficking of children is most prevalent. The United States government has identified the main industries for which male and female children and adults are trafficked; females are trafficked primarily for sexual exploitation and forced labour. Child labour in the cocoa industry is widespread, with children brought in from surrounding countries to work in poor conditions on the plantations. The 2016 constitution established the government's strong stance on eliminating trafficking in the country, with more laws and punishment. The government established a four-year plan to combat human trafficking, and made their first arrests under the new legislation in 2018.

UNICEF and with other organisations are working to help reduce and eliminate human trafficking from Ivory Coast. UNICEF workers are stationed at the country's border to intercept child traffickers. It and its partner organizations work with the government to help strengthen and enforce existing laws.

=== Child labour in the cocoa industry ===
Ivory Coast, producing 41 percent of the world's cocoa, is the world's largest producer; the industry supplies 60 percent of the country's export revenue. Cocoa production employs nearly seven million people nationwide. The International Labour Organisation estimated that Ivory Coast has 378,000 working children; at the time, the country had not signed the Minimum Age Convention. Dangerous child labour on cocoa plantations has been widely reported, and international human-rights institutions have called for better regulation of a problem affecting an estimated 15,000 child slaves on the plantations. The governments of Ivory Coast and Ghana signed a bilateral cooperation agreement in 2016 to fight cross-border trafficking and forced child labour.

=== International Criminal Court ===
Ivory Coast accepted the jurisdiction of the International Criminal Court (ICC) in 2003, although it was not a signatory of the Rome Statute at the time; it ratified the statute in February 2013. The ICC opened an investigation after the 2011 post-election crisis, guided by the ICC prosecutor, of all crimes alleged from 19 September 2002 to the present. The investigation was the first of its kind in which the nation had accepted the jurisdiction of the court but not yet signed the Rome Statute.

After motu proprio investigations opened by the ICC prosecutor, a warrant was issued in 2011 for Laurent Gbagbo's arrest. Gbagbo and former youth minister Charles Blé Goudé are being investigated for crimes against humanity, including murder, rape, attempted murder, and persecution. Although Gbagbo is in ICC custody, his detention has been reviewed in light of his possible release for the remainder of his trial. Gbagbo is the first former head of state to be tried by the ICC.

== Ivorian Human Rights League ==
The Ivorian Human Rights League (Ligue Ivoirienne des Droits de l'Homme, LIDHO) is a politically- and religiously-independent body with a goal of ensuring a fair and lawful legal system. Established on 21 March 1987, it relies on donations from partner organisations. The league focuses on research and producing educational materials as a lobby for the rule of law, denouncing human-rights violations and providing strategies for overcoming them. LIDHO works in a number of areas, including gender equality and peace. The league was not recognised until 1990, after the oppressive rule of Félix Houphouët-Boigny ended with his death. Since their recognition, LIDHO has worked with international institutions to investigate human-rights abuses in Ivory Coast and have united organisations from a variety of religious, social and political backgrounds in the Convention of Ivorian Civil Society to work together for peace.

== United Nations ==
In 2004, the United Nations Operation in Ivory Coast (ONUCI) was formed to promote peace and human rights. Formed as unrest between Ivorian political parties increased, it worked towards a peace agreement. The ONUCI also worked to legitimise elections and minimise violence by both parties. During the 2011 political crisis, UN peacekeepers worked to ensure the safety and protection of civilians caught in war. The ONUCI's mandate was extended several times to reflect the changing political situation in the country. UN Secretary General Ban Ki-moon said in March 2013 that although the operation could reduce its military presence due to increased political stability, considerable peace-building and national dialogue was still needed. The operation ended on 30 June 2017, but the United Nations and other supporting organisations continue to provide funding and aid to maintain peace and work with the government to ensure stability.

== See also ==
- Gender equality in the Ivory Coast
