= Battle of Ber (2013) =

- Part of Mali War
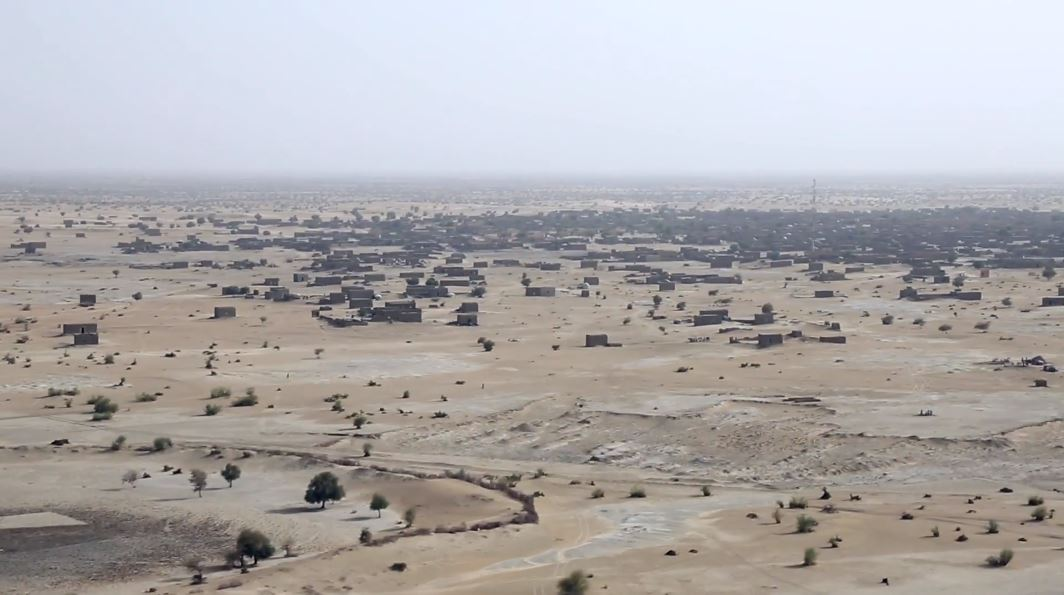
- View of Ber circa 2017
Date	April 21, 2013
Location	Ber, Mali
Result	MAA victory

Belligerents
Arab Movement of Azawad	MNLA

Casualties and losses
Unknown	Unknown; 3 prisoners
- 2 civilians killed, 4 wounded

On April 21, 2013, clashes broke out in Ber, Mali, after fighters from the Arab Movement of Azawad seized the town from the National Movement for the Liberation of Azawad (MNLA).

== Background ==
The first major conflict between the Arab Movement of Azawad (MAA) and the MNLA occurred on February 23, when MAA fighters raided the town of In Khalil, which was then under the control of the MNLA. The MAA is composed mostly of Tilemsi Arabs, and the MNLA is composed mainly of Tuaregs. Ethnic tensions between the two groups increased in the late 2000s, particularly in Gao Region.

== Battle ==
On April 21, a Malian military source from Timbuktu stated unknown militants stormed the town of Ber, which was then under the control of the MNLA, but did not give any specifics. MAA spokesperson Mohamed Ould Ramadane stated that the MAA launched the attack against the MNLA, chasing away an "armed band". Ramadane also restated the MAA's willingness to work with French and AFISMA.

Local sources stated that at least two civilians were killed in the battle, including a 15-year-old girl and an elderly man. A Tuareg resident of Ber stated four civilians were also injured in the battle. The marabout's son was also kidnapped by the MAA, but the MAA claimed that he was holding a weapon at the time, and therefore a prisoner of war and not a hostage. The French army, while present, did not intervene, instead flying planes over the town.

The MAA left Ber on April 25 but kept fourteen armed pick-ups on the outskirts of the town. Ramadane claimed that the MAA was monitoring the city in search of gangs.

== Aftermath ==
The MAA attacked Ber again on May 5, raiding and looting several houses and shops. A truck and two pick-ups were seized. The MAA abandoned the town shortly afterward, and Burkinabe and Malian forces captured it afterward. Burkinabe forces left Ber on May 7, leaving the town controlled by Malian forces. Twenty-three people suspected of being deserters from the Malian army were detained in Ber, but Malian forces later claimed to have released them.

The MAA returned three Tuareg prisoners captured during the battle to the Mauritanian Army on May 16.
