= Clément Sawadogo =

Burkinabé politician

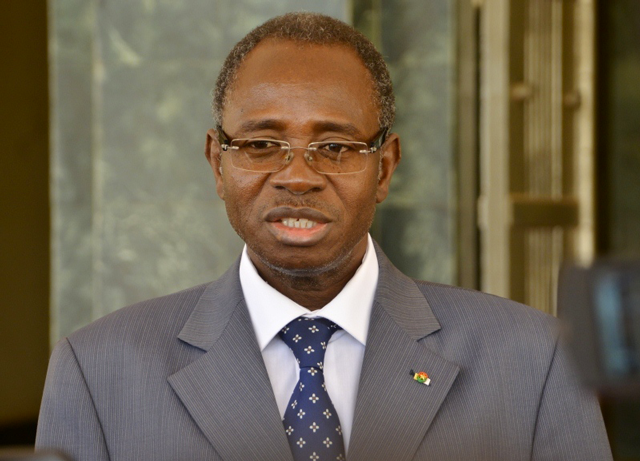
Clément Pengwendé Sawadogo in 2018

Clément Pengwendé Sawadogo is a Burkinabé politician who has served in the government of Burkina Faso as Minister of the Civil Service, Labour and Social Security since 2016. He is a member of the People's Movement for Progress (MPP).

Sawadogo, an adviser on economic affairs, served as Director-General of the Radio and Television of Burkina Faso and as Director of the Cabinet of the Prime Minister before being appointed as Secretary-General of the Government and the Council of Ministers on 5 September 2005. A few months later, he was appointed as Minister of Territorial Administration and Decentralization on 6 January 2006.

In the November 2015 parliamentary election, Sawadogo was elected to the National Assembly as an MPP candidate in Kadiogo Province. After MPP leader Roch Marc Christian Kaboré was sworn in as President, Sawadogo was appointed to the government as Minister of the Civil Service, Labour and Social Security on 12 January 2016.

Sawadogo was among the hostages taken in the January 15, 2016 attacks on Ouagadougou. He was freed along with about 30 others the next day by security forces.
