= Jean-Noël Rey =

Swiss politician (1949–2016)

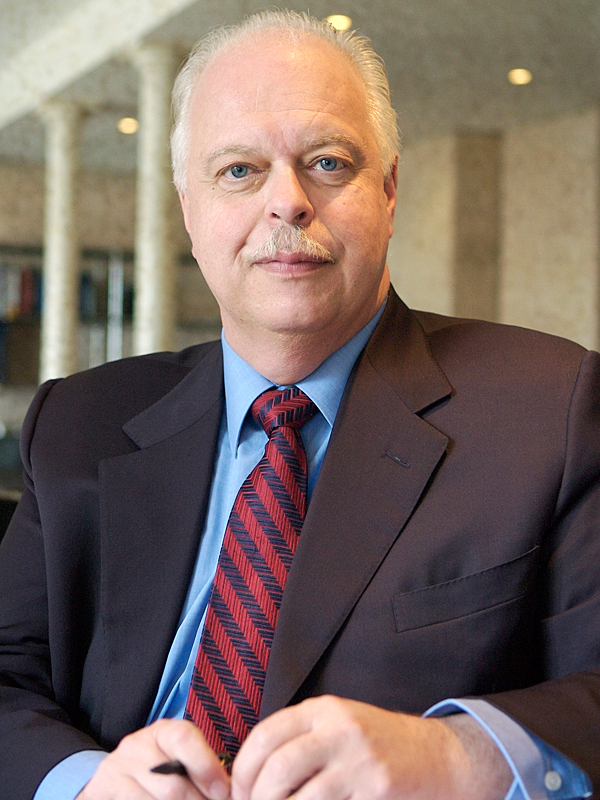
Jean-Noël Rey

Jean-Noël Rey (23 December 1949 – 15 January 2016) was a Swiss manager and politician of the Social Democratic Party. He was director-general of the head of the Swiss post and telecommunications service (PTT) from 1990 to 1998, and a member of the National Council of Switzerland from 2003 to 2007.

Born in Siders, Valais, Rey graduated with a doctorate in social sciences from the University of Geneva in 1978. He worked as a personal assistant to Federal Councillor Otto Stich and was elected director-general of PTT in 1990. When PTT was split into Swisscom and Swiss Post in 1998, Rey was the subject of allegations of cronyism and resigned as CEO of the new postal service, but was acquitted of criminal charges.

He subsequently headed the Swiss branch of the parcel delivery service DPD from 2001 to 2004. In 2003, Rey was elected to the National Council, the lower chamber of the national parliament, in which he served until 2007 as a member of the Finance Committee.

Rey was killed in the 2016 Ouagadougou terror attacks in Burkina Faso, together with another former Swiss politician, Georgie Lamon. They were in one of the cafes and restaurants popular with Westerners that were attacked. They had been visiting a school built by a Swiss charity founded by Lamon, Association Yelen, for which Rey had helped raise money.
