= Safiya Hussaini =

Nigerian woman accused of adultery

Safiya Hussaini Tungar Tudu
- Born: 1967
- Died: 2024 (aged 56–57)
- Citizenship: Nigerian
- Children: 1

Safiya Hussaini Tungar Tudu (1967–2024) was a Nigerian woman condemned to death for adultery in 2002. She gave birth to a child as a single woman in Sokoto, a Nigerian state under Sharia law. She was sentenced to be stoned, but was acquitted of all charges in March 2002 after a retrial.

== Trial ==
Hussaini was sentenced to death by stoning in October 2001 for allegedly having a child with a married neighbour. She had the child after her divorce. Hussaini claimed that she was the victim of repeated rape. The man she accused was acquitted by the Sharia court due to lack of evidence.

During her trial, Hussaini had no legal representation and was not informed of her legal rights. The Sokoto court dismissed her testimony and convicted her on 12 October 2001.

The verdict was widely condemned and international campaigns and petitions to release her were launched. Halima Abdullahi, director of Help Eliminate Loneliness and Poverty (HELP), a non-governmental organisation, criticized the verdict. In a statement she said the verdict was a "thorough embarrassment” to the majority of Nigerian Muslims. The group argued that the judgment was wrong because Hussaini was accused of adultery instead of fornication, since she was a divorcee. Also, the four witnesses required by Islamic law were not available at the trial. Halima claimed that the verdict occurred because Hussaini came from an underprivileged class. Roman Catholic Archbishop Anthony Olubunmi Okogie volunteered to die in her place. Describing the verdict as “gender discrimination of the highest order,” the group called on Governor Attahiru Bafarawa to intervene to save Hussaini's life.

Hussaini appealed. Her lawyers claimed that Hussaini's former husband was the father of her daughter and that the woman who testified against her had made her original statement under duress. Further they argued that the alleged act of adultery had taken place before Sharia law was implemented in the state. Full Sharia law was established in Sokoto in June 2000, a month after the baby was conceived. She was defended by Nigerian human rights lawyer Hauwa Ibrahim.

Hussaini claimed that her pregnancy was the result of rape.

Hussaini won her appeal on 25 March 2002 and the case was dismissed. The Appeal Court in Sokoto found that the death sentence, originally handed down by an Islamic Sharia court in October, had been baseless. The court ruled that the adultery provisions of Sokoto's Sharia law could not be used against Hussaini, as the alleged adultery had taken place before the introduction of Sharia law in Sokoto; moreover it concluded that pregnancy was not enough as evidence of adultery.

Hussaini's plight was later recorded in the book, Safiya Hussaini Tungar Tudu: I, Safiya (2004).

18 years later, Hussaini said she had forgiven her tormentors.

== Death ==
Hussaini died in 2024, succumbing to a protracted illness.

== See also ==
- Amina Lawal
- Hauwa Ibrahim
- Sharia in Nigeria
