= Inaghalawass skirmish =

2018 battle in Mali

- Part of Mali War
Date	February 14, 2018
Location	Inaghalawass, between Boghassa and Tinzaouaten, Mali
Result	French victory

Belligerents
France	Jama'at Nasr al-Islam wal Muslimin

Commanders and leaders
Unknown	Abu Hassan al-Ansari †; Malick Ag Wanasnat †

Casualties and losses
None	23 killed or captured

The Inaghalawass skirmish took place on February 14, 2018, between French forces and Jama'at Nasr al-Islam wal Muslimin fighters. In French airstrikes, former al-Mourabitoun commander Abu Hassan al-Ansari was killed.

== Prelude ==
In 2017, five jihadist movements that had rebelled against the Malian government in 2012 merged into the al-Qaeda aligned Jama'at Nasr al-Islam wal Muslimin (JNIM), led by Iyad Ag Ghaly. Following the merger, JNIM expanded its influence in Mali between 2017 and 2018, carrying out attacks on Malian troops and French interventionist forces.

== Skirmish and aftermath ==
On the night of February 13 and 14, a battle broke out between French forces and JNIM insurgents in the village of Inaghalawass, on the Malian-Algerian border between Boghassa and Tinzaouaten. Between 4:40 and 5:20 am, French fighters mobilized in response to the attack, launching airstrikes on the JNIM positions. The attack was carried out by French "Sabre" troops.

Later that day, the French general staff announced that twenty JNIM fighters had been "neutralized", and three of their vehicles were destroyed. François Lecointre gave a slightly more detailed assessment, stating 23 jihadists had been killed or taken prisoner. According to Lecointre, French forces took no losses. A foreign security source for AFP reported between 10 and 17 jihadist deaths, a toll corroborated by Malian security sources, who also stated 14 were apprehended.

Among the dead were Malick Ag Wanasnat, a former colonel of the Malian army and a close confidant of Iyad Ag Ghaly. Abdalla Ag Oufata, the former mayor of Boghassa and Sidi Mohamed Ougana, a local preacher, were killed as well.

JNIM announced on March 3, 2018, that Abu Hassan al-Ansari, the founder of al-Mourabitoun and a top leader of JNIM, was killed in the attacks. In response, JNIM carried out the 2018 Ouagadougou attacks. The group also announced the deaths of Sheikh Abu Ahmed al-Fulani and Tariq al-Sufi along with al-Ansari, Oufata, Ougana, and Wanasnat.
