= Georgie Lamon =

Swiss politician

Georgie Lamon (11 November 1934 – 16 January 2016) was a Swiss politician killed in the 2016 Ouagadougou attacks in the capital of Burkina Faso.

== Political career ==
Lamon's political career began as being chair for the Social Democratic Party (PS). He subsequently served in the Grand Council of Valais, with the PS. Lamon served as a National Councillor for Valais as a member of the PS.

== Charity work and death ==
Lamon founded the charity Yelen with the objective of building canteens for schools. While in Ouagadougou on a trip to dedicate a canteen built by Yelen, Lamon was killed at a restaurant during the 2016 Ouagadougou attacks along his with former colleague Jean-Noël Rey.
