= Gender equality in Ivory Coast =

There are multiple factors which contribute to gender equality in Ivory Coast (Côte d'Ivoire). The history of the Ivory Coast still influences gender inequality in the country. A large factor which also pushes the nation back to be a strong economic player is the lack of education especially for women. It starts from primary education up to higher-level education where girls are obviously disadvantaged compared to boys. Arranged marriages for girls who are often under the age of 18 and lack of knowledge about laws and their rights also promote gender inequality.

Due to the Ivorian Civil War, gender based violence has increased, especially during and after this period of time. A lot of Ivorian women have to deal with domestic violence. Discussion groups have been created to address the issues and spread attention. Furthermore, a lot of global movements and campaigns have been invented to promote gender parity in Côte d'Ivoire.

== Background ==
According to Clignet the history of Ivorian society has a huge impact on how women are viewed nowadays. The relationship towards France and the common past influenced Ivorian tradition and cultural also referred to women.

== Education ==
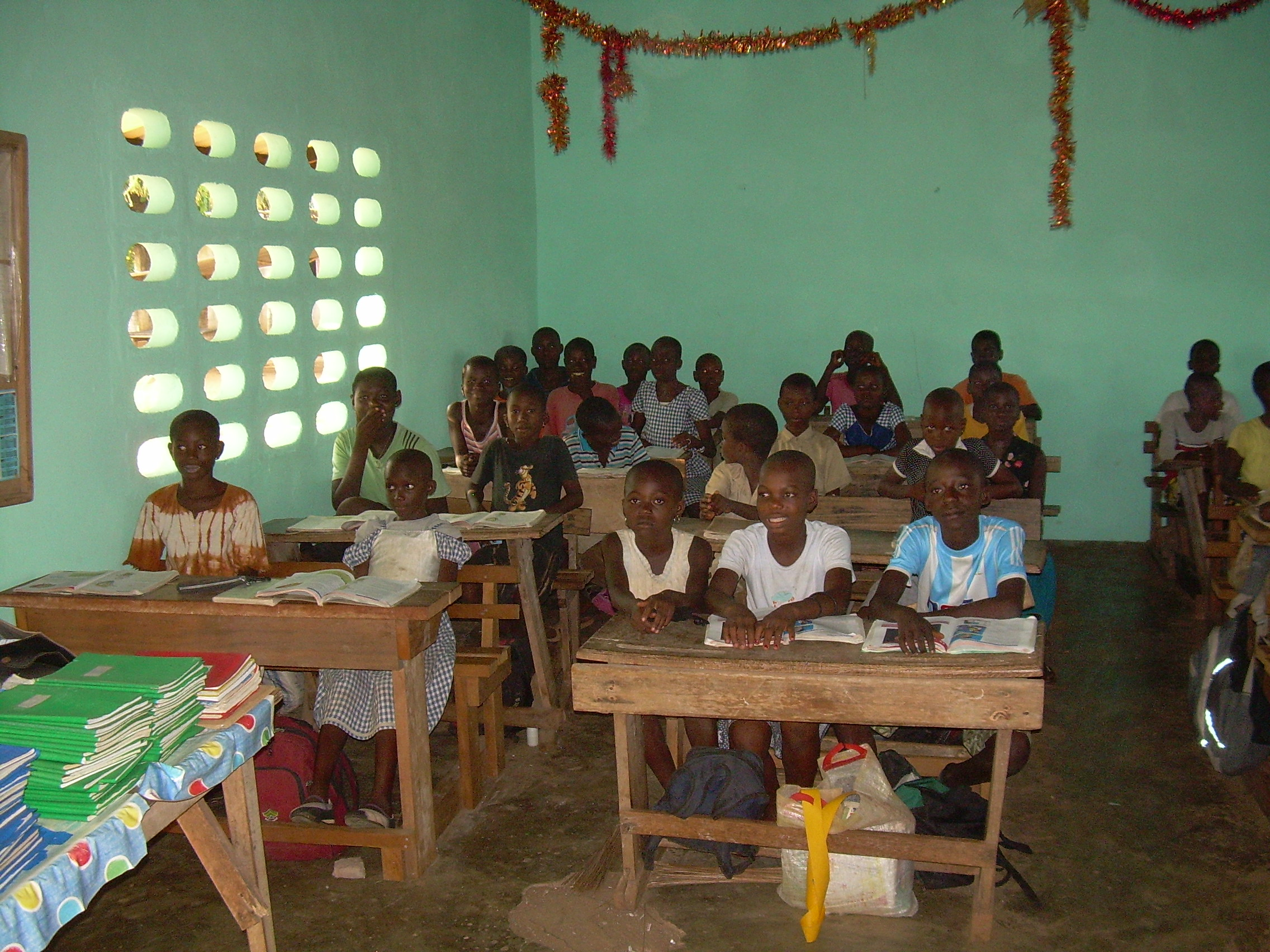
Children in a classroom in an ivorian primary school

The disadvantage of girls in terms of education is presented through Statistics published in 2015 by the UNESCO Institute for Statistics. It shows that 74.7% of girls and 83.7% of boys were enrolled in primary level schools. But the gross enrollment rate for other levels like secondary level education states that it were only 36.6% girls compared to 51% of boys. In higher education the enrollment rates sink from 11.2% of enrolled male students opposed to just 7.3% of females. According to Grisay girls are already inferior to boys when it comes to primary education like learning and speaking French. It also has to do with certain cultural origins that follow the habit that girls education is not as important as the education for boys. For that reason girls participate school way less than boys or leave school earlier. Therefore, girls have less opportunities to learn languages like french. The educational stages of girls are also impacted by the situation of the family itself. A lot of girls leave the circle of the family less than boys so possibilities to speak and practice language decrease automatically. Because of that fathers also tend to communicate more with their sons and train them to speak French.

Moreover, classes in the Ivory Coast consist mainly of oral participation. Because girls are told to hold themselves back and try not to stand out also culturally, female students developed a passive attitude overtime and started to speak less in class. This also contributed to the fact that women are disadvantaged in the Ivorian education system.

== Women and the law ==
Two main tribes the Dioula and Bété show differences regarding women's knowledge of legal matters. The majority of Dioula women are not really informed about existing rights for women compared to Bété women who are more aware and therefore use the advantages if possible. There are multiple factors which play along the different education in terms of religion, ethnicity, engagement in working field and politics.

Between 1964 and 1982 a lot of Ivorian women did not know that polygamy was against the law. The Bété women are nowadays less interested in polygynous engagements compared to the Dioula. This has also to do with the fact that Béte are more aware of the laws, because of contact to catholic missions. Dioula women are Muslims and tend to be more traditional. Due to lack of education Dioula females make less use of the laws of 1964 while the Bété women seem more engaged in the new civil law system and make more use of it.

== Child marriage ==
According to UNFPA 48% of women between 20 and 24 in the Ivory Coast do not gain education and 27% who had access to primary education were married or in union aged 18 compared to 9% of women who had secondary education or higher.

More than one-third of Ivorian girls are forced into marriage before the age of 18. Especially for poor households the bride price is an important source of income. There are recently more initiatives to end child marriage, among others the African Union campaign launched by the Ivory Coast on 5 December 2017.

== Violence ==
Wars like the Ivorian Civil War (2002 and 2007) increased Gender based violence in the country. During war or social political crisis more violent actions have been enforced. Primarily forms of sexual violence for example rape have been repeatedly reported during wartimes.

Gender Based violence was and is a big issue in the Ivory Coast. Parts in the country have been locations for women and child-trafficking who were forced labor and sexual exploitation. As source and transit of these events Ivorian women faced a lot of different forms of physical violence. A lot of the violence just like sexual violence or physical violence like dragging, kicking etc. has been implemented by intimate partners and non-partners.

To intervent gender based violence there have been discussion groups about gender norms which focus on reducing several forms of intimate partner violence. To be successful in the reduction of violence against women the nation has to increase the policies and attention regarding GBV. This emphasis would make clear that the disruption of routine in lives through violence and the effect on family structures influence the Ivorian life drastically. Examples for disruption could be no ability of gathering foodstuffs or receiving medical attention.

== Economy ==
The Ivory Coast is the world's largest producer of cacao and cashews and has a subsistence agriculture-based economy. However, under the customary system of land ownership, women are often denied access to land ownership; according to a 2013 World Bank report, Ivorian women, especially rural areas, are often "forced to negotiate plots of land from their families of origin or their husbands for growing food crops." About three-quarters of rural women in the Ivory Coast lived below the poverty line as of 2013.

A 2017 report from the World Bank projected that the adoption of policies to combat gender discrimination in the Ivory Coast could lead to additional long-term economic growth of between US$6 billion to US$10 billion. The World Bank report called for greater access to education for girls; for policies to decrease gender discrimination in the economy (e.g., by increasing women's participation in the civil service and the private sector), by reducing wage disparities, and by increasing access to health care (especially maternal healthcare and family planning). The report called for policies aimed at: "(i) identifying the content of the most urgently needed reforms; (ii) identifying champions who could defend these reforms; and (iii) minimizing the adjustment costs or frictions that could hamper the implementation of the reforms over the long term."

== Women's movements ==
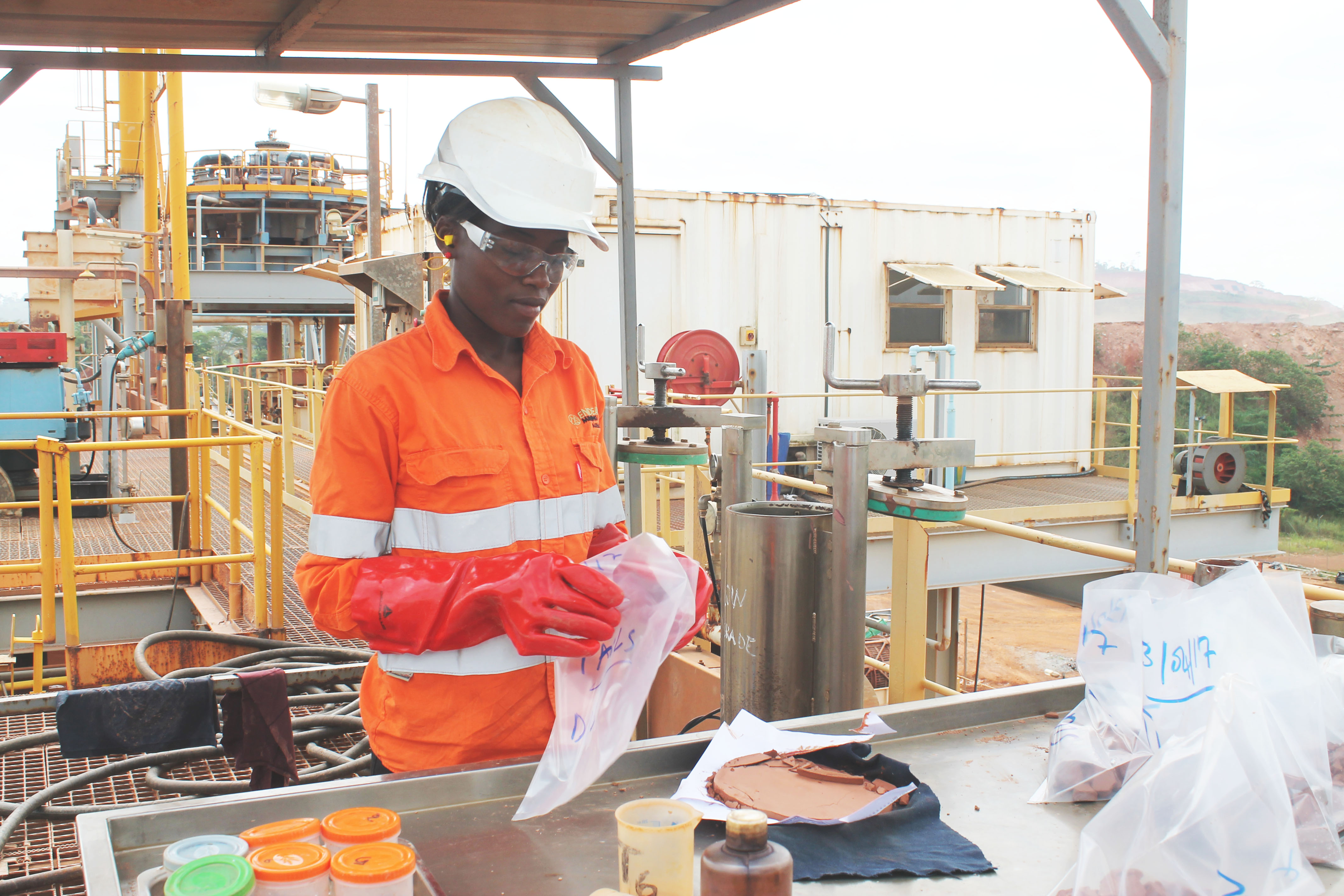
Ivorian worker in mining industry.

UN Women reported that in November 2017, there was a "16 Days of Activism Against Gender-Based Violence Campaign" in the Ivory Coast. The campaign was part of the HeForShe global movement.

In the 1990s, Tomam Constance Yai, the head of the Ivoirian Association for the Defense of Women's Rights, campaigned against polygamy, which was common at the time in both rural and urban Ivory Coast—the "phenomenon of multiple wives, mistresses and concubines that she says perpetuates the sexual privileges of men while stunting the lives of African women." Yai and other activists also petitioned the government to withdraw a discriminatory divorce bill that had been proposed, which would have allowed husbands to easily divorce their wives for alleged adultery, while allowing women the right to divorce only if the husband was "caught in a sexual act at the couple's home with the same woman more than once."

In 2018, Côte d'Ivoire became the second country to become part of the African Women Leaders Network, an initiative to support women's leadership. The project, with international and government backing, works to promote "good governance, peace and stability" focusing on the 2030 Sustainable Development Goals.
