= 2015 Anéfis dispute =

2015 Anefis dispute
- Part of Mali War
Date	August 15–29, 2015
Location	Anefis and surrounding areas, Kidal Region, Mali
Result	Platform victory: Peace negotiations signed between the CMA and Platform in October 2015

Belligerents
Platform: GATIA	CMA

Casualties and losses
Unknown	15 killed (per GATIA)

On August 17, 2015, clashes broke out between pro-government GATIA militants and rebels from the Coordination of Azawad Movements (CMA) in the town of Anefis and surrounding areas. The dispute was settled in September.

== Prelude ==
Prior to the Anefis dispute, pro-government Platform and rebel Coordination of Azawad Movements (CMA) groups entered the Algiers Accords with the Malian government as a means of ending the Mali War. The accords were supposed to end conflict between the CMA and the Malian government and its allies, but only enforced the status quo of the CMA remaining in control of Kidal Region. The previous confrontation between Platform and CMA fighters was in January 2015 in Tabrichat, and both GATIA and the Arab Movement of Azawad claimed victory.

== Clashes and dispute ==
The ceasefire from the Algiers Accords was broken for the first time on August 15, after a short skirmish broke out between the CMA and Platform in the area of Edjarer Amessine in the wadi of Touzik, eighty kilometers south of Kidal. Clashes resumed on August 16 in Edjarer Amessine, and spread to Diré and Tabankort.

Clashes broke out between the two groups at Anefis on August 17, with much more intensity than the previous skirmishes. Anefis, which was held at the time by CMA forces, fell under GATIA control. GATIA's secretary-general Fahad Ag Almahmoud stated that fifteen CMA fighters were killed in the battle. That evening, MINUSMA announced the establishment of a security zone in Kidal and its surroundings. Peacekeepers deployed to the area the next day, and warned Platform that if they advanced to Kidal then MINUSMA would open fire on them. Meanwhile, Platform raised the Malian flag in Anefis.

Both GATIA and the CMA accused each other of first breaking the truce, however a source in MINUSMA speaking to Jeune Afrique stated that they "had no doubt GATIA attacked first."

== Aftermath ==
The Malian government condemned the breakdown of the ceasefire in an August 17 statement. Two days later, however, they stated they had no knowledge of the MINUSMA security zone and urged the UN to take it down. The CMA announced its intention to launch reprisal attacks on August 19, and asked MINUSMA to lift the security zone. MINUSMA was able to call on both Platform and the CMA to step down from their positions, and return to status quo ante bellum.

Platform initially refused to leave Anefis on August 24, prompting the CMA to suspend its participation in the Algiers Accords until Platform complied. Meanwhile, international mediation based in Gao coupled with pressure from the Malian government forced Platform to announce their departure from Anefis on August 29. The departure did not happen until September 9, and was immediately followed by CMA fighters capturing the city. The Malian government denounced the CMA's capture, and claimed MINUSMA should've taken control instead.

A CMA delegation went to Bamako on September 23 and 24, meeting Malian president Ibrahim Boubacar Keïta and, for the first time, a delegation from Platform. Both delegations agreed to respect the ceasefire and not confront each other. In late September and early October, delegations, tribal and military leaders, and fighters from the CMA and Platform met in Anefis to conduct negotiations. Prisoners were exchanged on both sides, and both sides were satisfied with the negotiations.
