= Hauwa Ibrahim =

Nigerian human rights lawyer (born 1968)

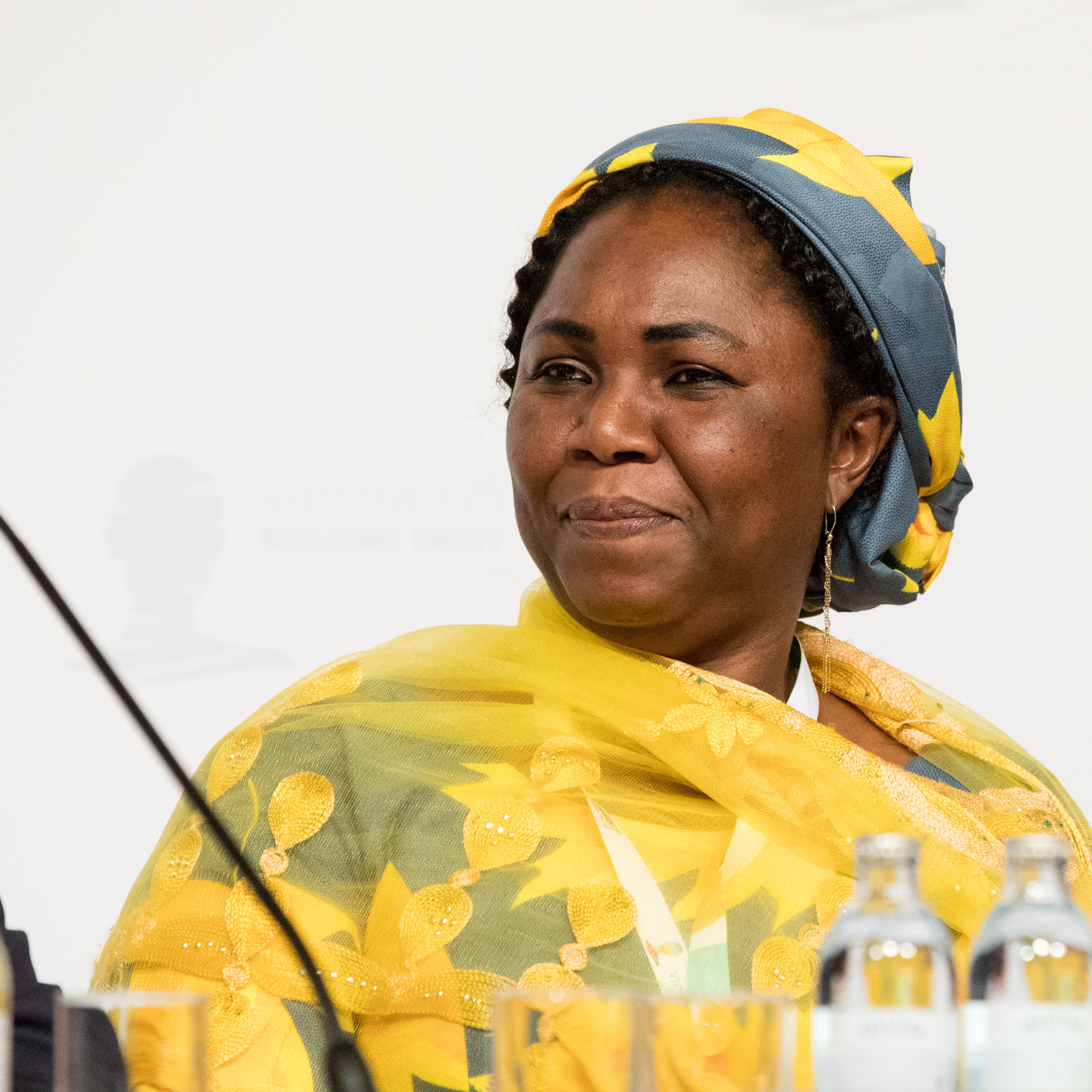
- Born: 20 January 1968 (age 58); Hinna, North-Eastern State (today in Gombe State)
- Citizenship: Nigeria
- Education: Women Teachers College, Azare
- Alma mater: University of Jos
- Occupations: Lawyer, teacher
- Known for: Human Rights Activism
- Awards: European Parliament's Sakharov Prize in 2005

Hauwa Ibrahim (born 1968) is a Nigerian human rights lawyer who won the European Parliament's Sakharov Prize in 2005.

== Early life ==
Hauwa Ibrahim was born in Gombe, Nigeria in 1968. She was born in a Muslim family of eight children. Ibrahim grew up in a small village called Hinna which is in Yalmatu Deba Local Government Area. She was a talah girl. A talah girl walks house to house selling items that she carries on her head.This included objects such as groundnuts, onions, vegetables, and sweet potatoes. Selling these goods was Ibrahim's way of making a money but she was also committed to furthering her education.

Her mother was very supportive of her drive to having an education, saying that "education was the only path out of poverty". Ibrahim was originally arranged to be married when she was ten years old. To prevent her marriage, Ibrahim ran away to an all-girl boarding school and continued her path to an education.

One day, Ibrahim was watching a TV program titled "Kallabi a Cikin Rawani" which was means "women wear gele [head-scarf] around men." This is where she saw a woman named Mrs. Hannatu who was the first female Commissioner for Youths, Sports and Culture in Bauchi State. Ibrahim saw Mrs. Hannatu was on the program and listened as she explained her desire to help girls go to school. Seeing this opened up Ibrahim's eyes as she realized that she wants to do the same thing. It also gave her the courage to believe in herself.

Hauwa Ibrahim intellectual interests and her passion for justice fueled her journey to studying law. She was trained to be a lawyer and was considered one of the first Muslim woman in Nigeria to achieve this distinction.

== Education ==
Hauwa Ibrahim earned her undergraduate legal training (LLB) at the University of Jos in Nigeria. She got her master's degree in international law from there as well. In addition, she earned her graduate degree (BL) from Nigeria Law School. Soon after, she got her master's degree in international studies at American University Washington College of Law.

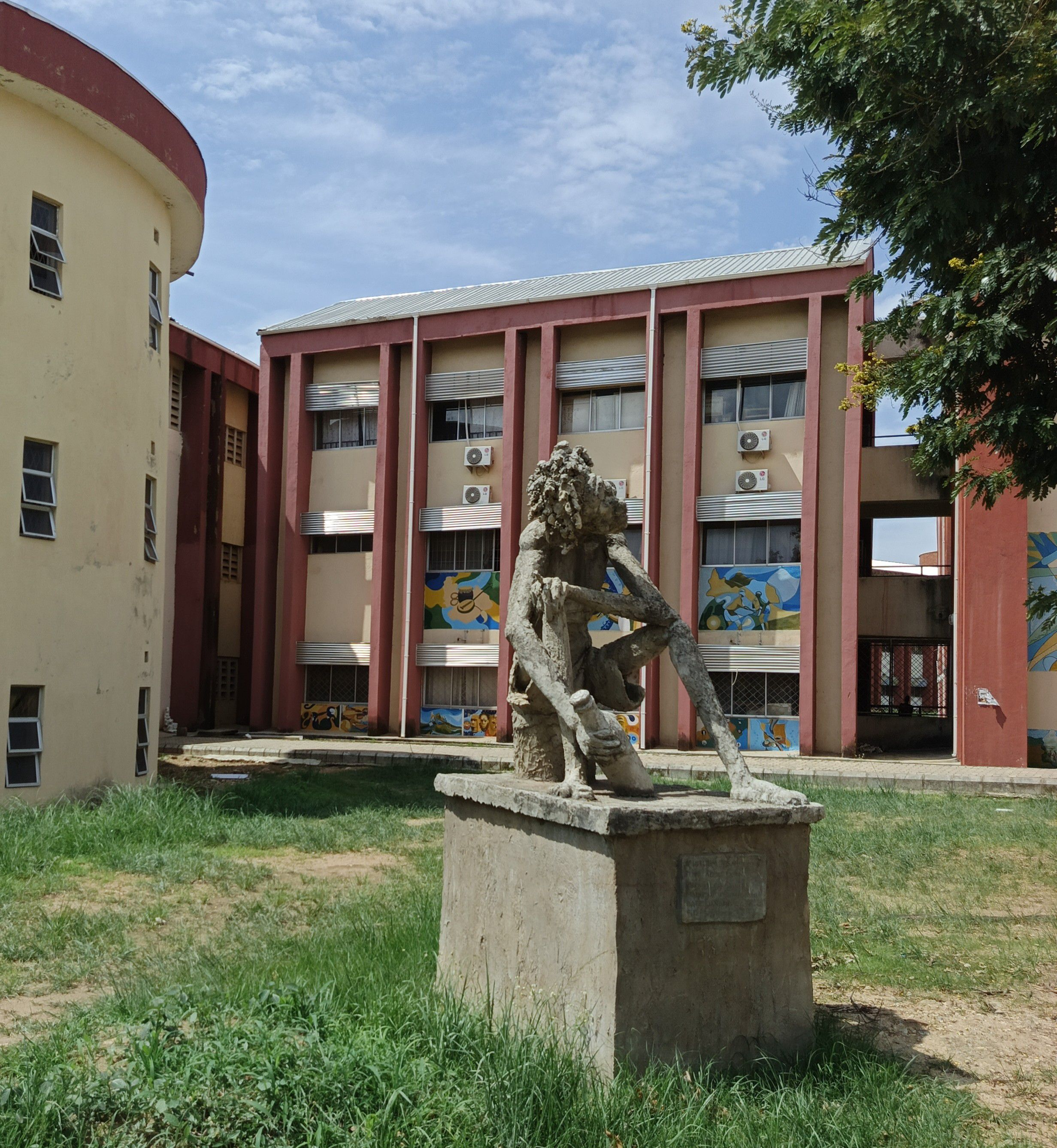
The school, University of Jos, where Hauwa Ibrahim earned her undergraduate degree from.

== Early career ==
In 1999, Hauwa Ibrahim was invited by a non-government organization for the purpose of putting together an appeal in the case brought under the new law, Sharia law. This case was about a young unmarried girl who became pregnant and was sentenced to have 100 lashes. Being pregnant and unmarried in Nigeria often involves serious punishment as it is heavily frowned upon.

This led Ibrahim to start a pro bono practice, defending people condemned under the Islamic Sharia laws that are in force in the northern Nigerian provinces. She defended Amina Lawal,^{[1]} Safiya Hussaini and Hafsatu Abubákar. This has however been refuted by Aliyu Musa Yawuri in her piece 'On Defending Safiyatu Hussaini and Amina Lawal'. In 2005 she was awarded the Sakharov Prize for this work.^{[2]}

Ibrahim first gained international attention in the year 2003 when she won a case that defending a Nigerian woman who was convicted of adultery and sentenced to death by stoning on Sharia law. This case served as a gateway to more than 150 cases Hauwa Ibrahim would later take on.

== International career ==
Hauwa has been a Visiting Professor at Saint Louis University School of Law and Stonehill College, a World Fellow at Yale University, a Radcliffe fellow, and a fellow at both the Human Rights Program and the Islamic Legal Studies Program at Harvard University. Hauwa is presently a teacher and a researcher at Harvard University. She is also one of the 25 leading figures on the Information and Democracy Commission launched by Reporters Without Borders.

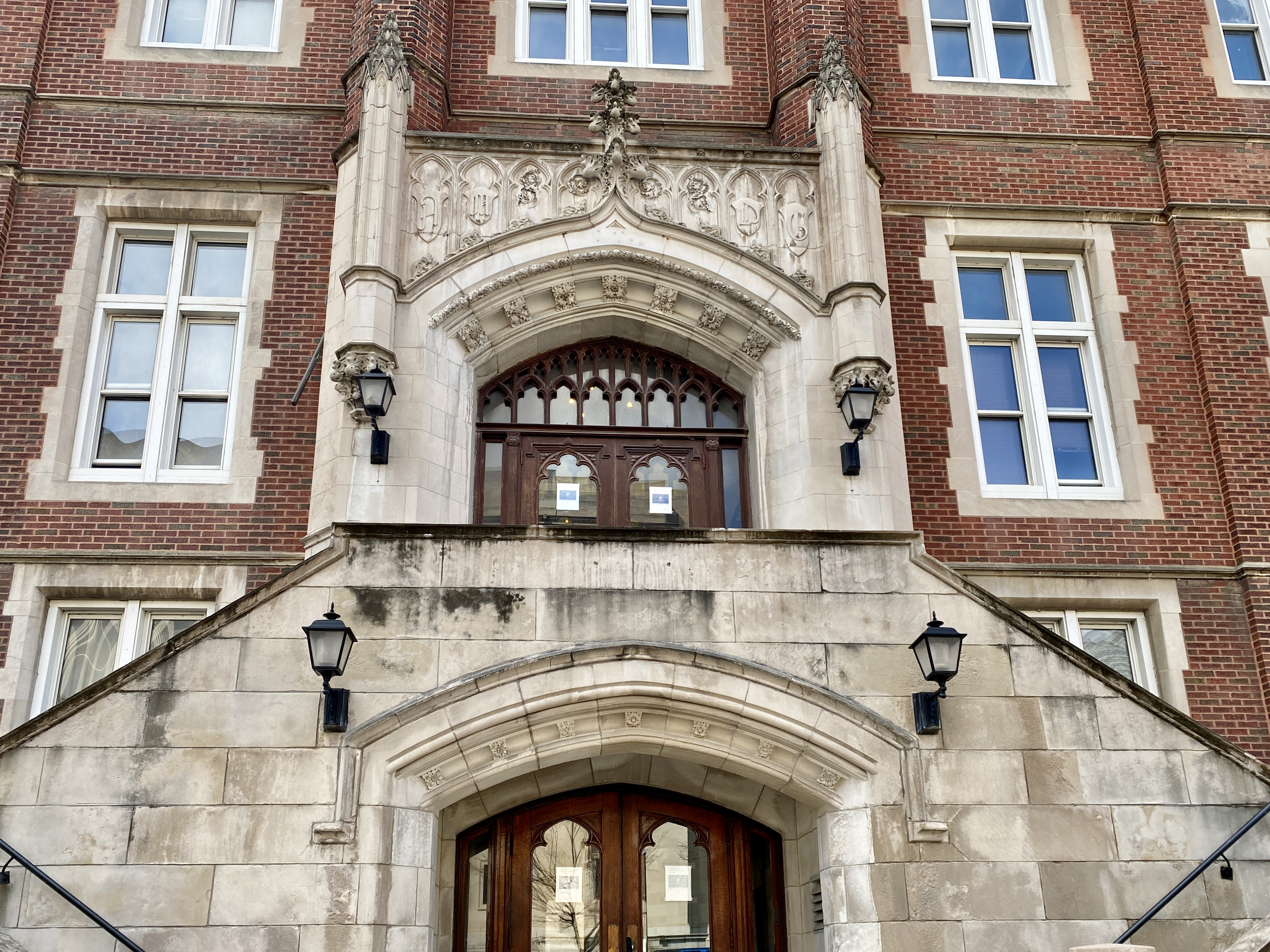
Saint Louis University School of Law, where Hauwa Ibrahim is a Visiting professor at.

While a Radcliffe fellow, Ibrahim adopted an interdisciplinary approach to delve into the theoretical foundations of Shariah law and examine how they have influenced legal practice, which has, in turn, affected the human rights of women in West Africa. Her research led to the book Practicing Shariah Law: Seven Strategies for Achieving Justice in Shariah Courts, published in January 2013."

== Literature ==
Hauwa Ibrahim's book Practicing Shariah Law: Seven Strategies for Achieving Justice in Shariah Courts was inspired by high-profile Shariah cases that arose after Zamfara State first introduced Shariah law on October 27 in 1999.

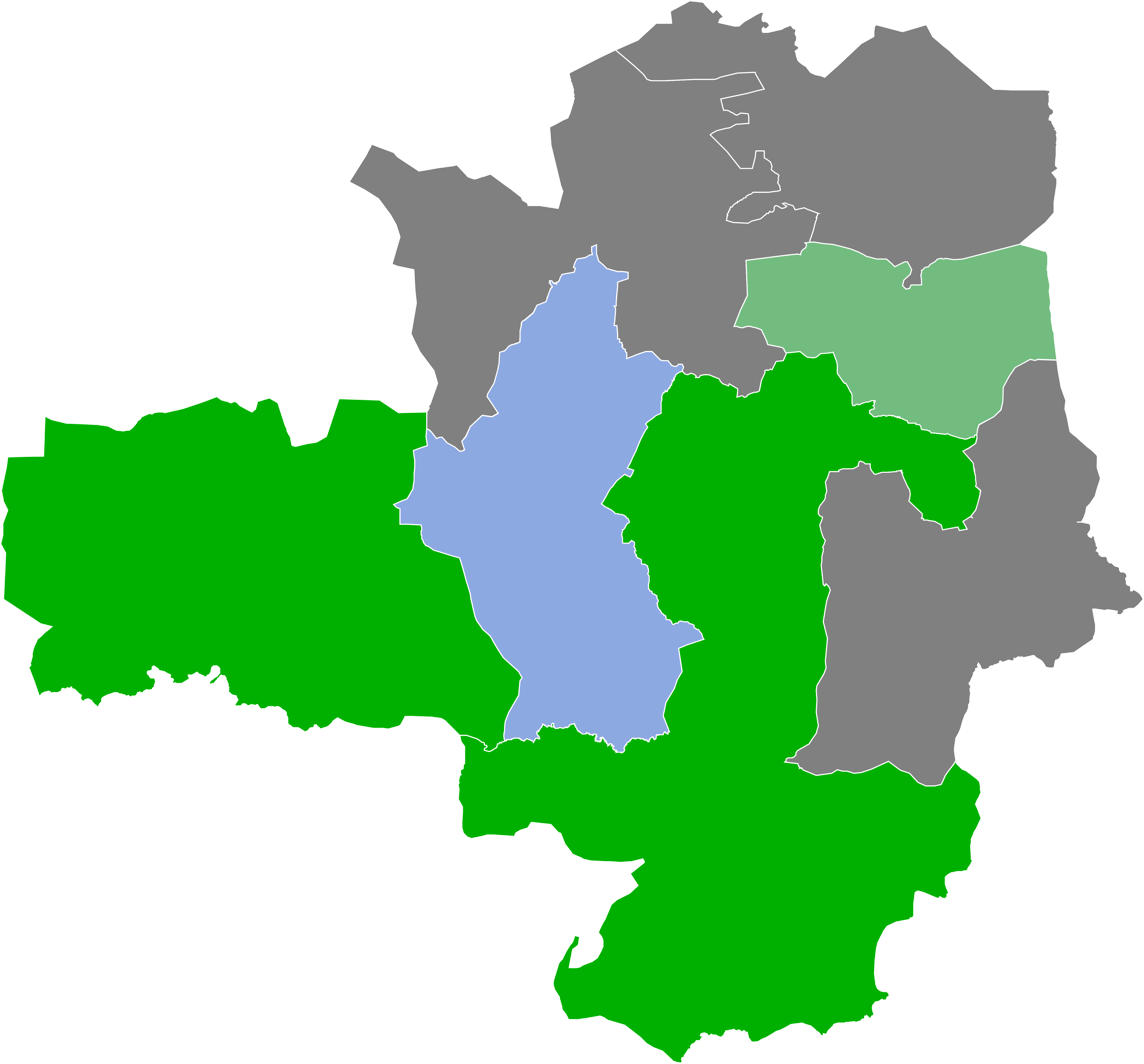
An outline of the state of Zamfara.

One of the first cases that caught Ibrahim's attention was that of Bariya, a thirteen-year-old girl who had a disability. She was from Tsafe in Zamfara State. Bariya's father's acquaintances raped her. Despite being sexually assaulted, she was convicted of zina (sex outside of marriage) and sentenced to 100 lashes. A women's rights organization titled Baobab contacted Ibrahim, who then became Bariya's legal defender.

Ibrahim stated that she had written her book for several reasons including challenges that she has seen with Amina Lawal's case. To defend these young girls' cases, Ibrahim voiced that she could not find any support in the Qur'an for stoning. This comment provoked significant backlash within Nigeria as some were accusing her of being anti-Islam or anti-Shariah.

== Awards and recognition ==
In 2005, Ibrahim was awarded by the European Parliament in recognition of her determination to challenge numerous charades and convictions under strict Islamic Sharia law against women in her own country. Ibrahim had won the Sakharov Prize for Freedom of Thought.

Hauwa Ibrahim's work has been acknowledged by international human-rights organizations such as Reporters Without Borders (RSF).

Ibrahim is the founder of the project, "Mothers Without Boarders" which is diverting the youth from extremism. This project arose from when President Goodluck Jonathan of Nigeria asked Ibrahim to serve on the Presidential Committee working to rescue 219 young girls that were kidnapped by Boko Haram. Ibrahim wanted to challenge extremist ideologies such as, rejecting education to girls, forcing people to follow strict rules, or using violence to enforce religion. She wanted the mothers of these young girls to push back against these ideas. Ibrahim later spent a year in Jordan in order to study how mothers try to stop their children from being recruited by ISIS, which later helped "Mothers Without Boarders" even more. This is not to be confused with the other organization named "Mothers Without Boarders", which is based in Zambia. This organization focuses on vulnerable children, women, and youth through topics like social support, education, and empowerment programs.Ibrahim is also the founder of the Peace Institute. This initiative is in regards to science, technology, engineering, arts, and mathematics in summer camps with children. Ibrahim uses STEM kits to teach students science. The Peace Institute has been a success, reaching over 5,000 pupils since 2019. It is expanding to more communities in Nigeria and Liberia and other African countries as well.

== See also ==
- First women lawyers around the world
