= Tourism in Ivory Coast =

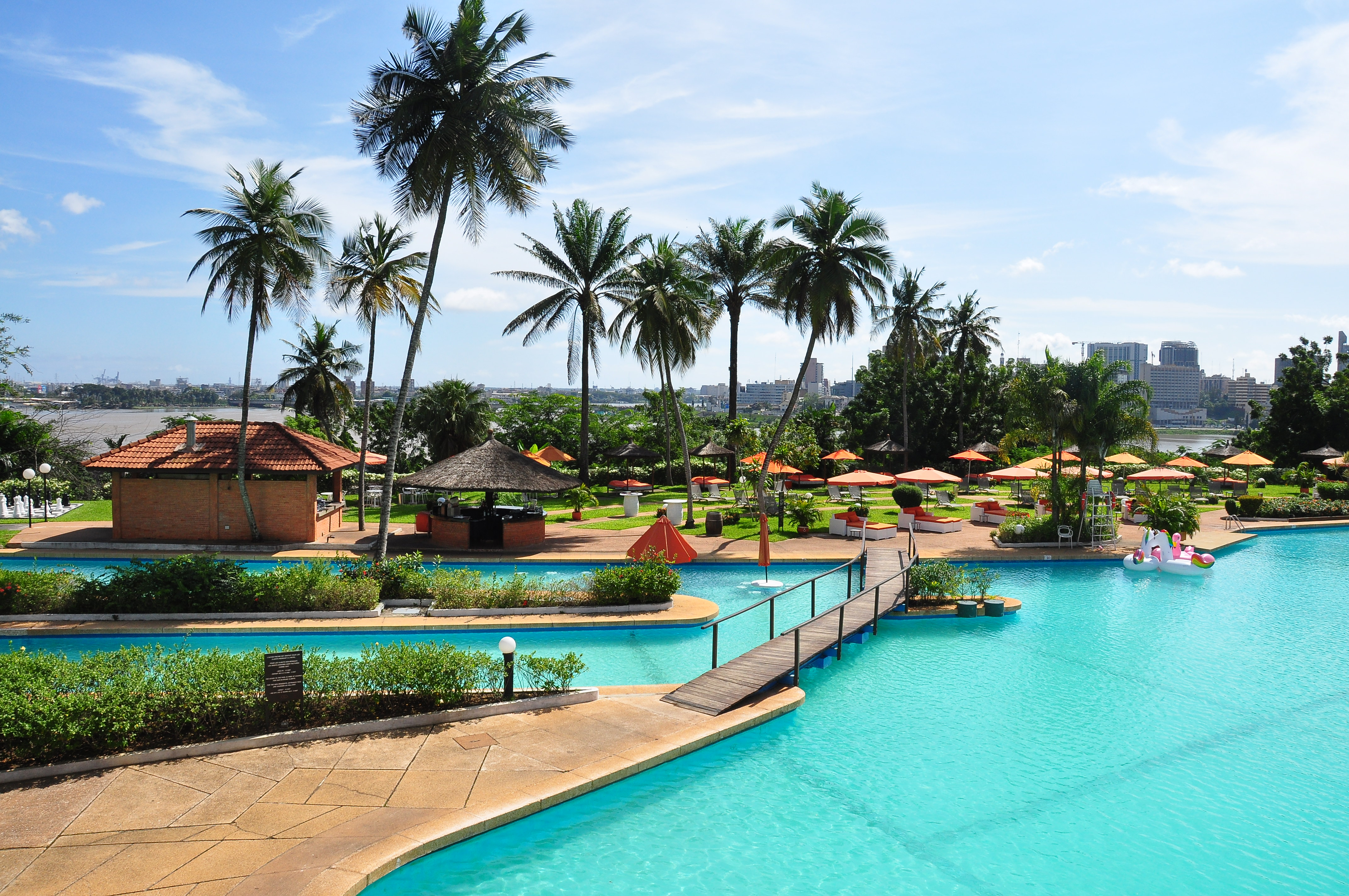
Sofitel hotel swimming pool in Abidjan

The Ivory Coast's tourism industry has developed significantly since the early 1970s. The country had 11,374 beds in 7,786 hotel rooms and a 70% occupancy rate in 1997. In 1998, there were 301,039 arriving tourists, including more than 73,000 from Germany, France, and United Kingdom. Beaches, tourist villages, and photo safaris through wildlife preserves are some of the main attractions.

In 2016, the United Kingdom's Foreign office advised British citizens to avoid areas of the country due to instability and an attack on tourists.

In 2017, the country aimed to increase tourism numbers to 1 million visitors by 2020. In 2019, the country announced an ambitious tourism strategy, with investments into the country's tourism infrastructure. The country aimed to attract between 4 and 5 million tourists yearly by 2025.

Passports are needed for travel into Ivory Coast. Visas are not required for stays of less than 91 days, though a vaccination certificate for yellow fever is required from all foreign visitors. In 2002, the US Department of State estimated the average cost of staying in Abidjan at $160 per day, compared to Yamoussoukro at $98.

During the 45th World Tourism Day celebrated in Man, a city in the West of Ivory Coast, on Saturday, September 27, 2025, Côte d’Ivoire’s Minister of Tourism and Leisure, Siandou Fofana, outlined the government’s vision for a reimagined tourism sector. This vision is anchored in the principles of sustainable development and driven by the national strategy “Sublime Côte d’Ivoire.”

Fofana presented a clear roadmap that puts local communities, responsible investment, environmental stewardship, and cultural heritage at the heart of public action in tourism. The approach aims to create a tourism model that not only attracts visitors but also benefits the people and preserves the country’s rich biodiversity and traditions.

Additionally, from September 19 to September 21, 2025, Ivory Coast held the 10th edition of the International Tourism and Leisure Fair (SITLA). Under the theme “Technological Innovations: A Driver for Tourism and Leisure Development,” the event showcased Côte d’Ivoire’s bold return to the global tourism stage, highlighting how digital transformation is shaping the future of travel and leisure in the country.

== See also ==
- Visa policy of Ivory Coast
