= Grand-Bassam shootings =

Terrorist attack in Grand-Bassam, Ivory Coast on 13 March 2016

- Part of the spillover of the War in the Sahel
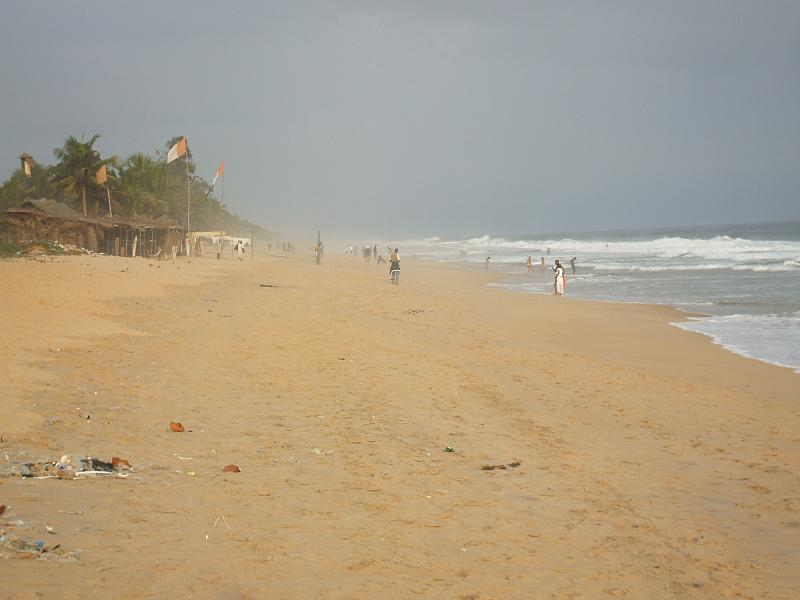
- The beach targeted, pictured in 2008
- Location: Grand-Bassam, Ivory Coast
- Date: 13 March 2016
- Attack type: Mass murder, mass shooting
- Weapons: Assault rifles Hand grenades
- Deaths: 22 (including 3 attackers)
- Injuries: 33
- Perpetrators: Al-Qaeda in the Islamic Maghreb; Al-Mourabitoun
- No. of participants: 6

Grand-Bassam within the Ivory Coast

On 13 March 2016, three Islamist gunmen opened fire at a beach resort in Grand-Bassam, Ivory Coast, killing at least 19 people and injuring 33 others.

== Attack ==
Three armed assailants attacked the Étoile du Sud hotel which, according to Agence France-Presse, was occupied by numerous expatriates at the time. (Note: A group of Ukrainian peacekeepers was also at the beach. Its team supervisor, Maj. Olena Liakhova, suffered a facial wound.) According to officials, 15 civilians and three special forces soldiers were killed.

The attackers were described as African, armed with Kalashnikov rifles and grenade belts and dressed in casual clothes and balaclavas. A shootout occurred between the attackers and police as the assailants reached the La Paillote Hotel. Local residents and tourists were evacuated by army personnel from the beach to nearby hotels, which were temporarily placed on lockdown.

The Associated Press quoted Government officials as saying that security forces had killed six armed men. The terrorists allegedly shouted "Allahu Akbar". An American embassy delegation was at Grand-Bassam on the date of the attack, but the US Embassy in Abidjan said on Twitter that there is "no evidence that U.S. citizens were targeted nor confirmed reports of any U.S [sic] citizens as harmed." French authorities had warned both Ivory Coast and Senegal weeks earlier of the danger of a terrorist attack.

Al-Qaeda in the Islamic Maghreb (AQIM) and al-Mourabitoun claimed responsibility for the attack. On 17 March, AQIM released the names of the attackers: Hamza al-Fulani and Abu Adam al-Ansari from al-Mourabitoun and Abderrahmane al-Fulani from the "Emirate of the Desert". It had been the third bloody attack on a tourism resort in West Africa for four months. In all, dozens of people fell victim to the assassinations and more were injured.

== Casualties ==
Deaths by nationality
Country	Number	Ref.
Ivory Coast	9	
France	4	
Lebanon	1	
Mali	1	
Nigeria	1	
Germany	1	
North Macedonia	1	
Undisclosed	1	
Total	19	

== Reactions ==
=== Domestic ===
- President Alassane Ouattara, visiting the site, stated: "These cowardly attacks by terrorists will not be tolerated".

=== International reactions ===
- Canada: Global Affairs Canada stated that "Canada condemns the terrorist attack at Grand-Bassam beach resort in Côte d'Ivoire. Our thoughts and prayers are with you."
- France: President François Hollande stated that he "strongly condemns the cowardly attack that caused the death of at least ten civilians, including at least one French national, and several members of the security forces in Grand-Bassam". He also stated that "France will bring its logistical support and intelligence to Ivory Coast to find the attackers. It will pursue and intensify its cooperation with its partners in the fight against terrorism."
- India: Prime Minister Narendra Modi condemned the attacks and stated his thoughts were with the families of the victims and wished the injured a speedy recovery.
- United Kingdom: Prime Minister David Cameron stated on Twitter: "I'm appalled by the devastating terror attacks in Ankara and the Ivory Coast. My thoughts are with all those affected."
- United States: In a statement by the National Security Council of the White House, the U.S. condemned the terrorist attack in Grand-Bassam. Furthermore, it extended deep condolences to the loved ones of the victims and that their thoughts and prayers also are with the injured. It also commended "the bravery of the Ivorian and French security personnel who responded to the situation and prevented even worse loss of life."
  Grand Bassam Terrorist attack Monument in Grand-Bassam, Ivory Coast that took place on 13 March 2016

== See also ==
- Radisson Blu Bamako attack
- 2015 Sousse attacks
- 2016 Ouagadougou attacks
- Crime in Ivory Coast
- June 2016 Mogadishu attacks
- List of Islamist terrorist attacks
- List of terrorist incidents, January–June 2016
