= Amina Lawal =

Nigerian woman formerly sentenced to death by stoning (born 1972)

Amina Lawal Kurami
- Born: 1972 (age 53–54)
- Citizenship: Nigerian

Amina Lawal Kurami (born 1972) is a Nigerian woman previously sentenced to death by stoning for adultery and for conceiving a child out of wedlock. Lawal was sentenced by an Islamic Sharia court in Funtua, in the northern state of Katsina, in Nigeria, on 22 March 2002. The person she identified as the father of the child, Yahayya Muhammad Kurami, was acquitted of the accusation of zinā. Although Kurami was excused because he took an oath by the Qur’an, this was not an option for Lawal due to the presence of her child, which is considered proof in the Mālikī school.

Lawal's conviction sparked an international controversy. It was overturned by the Katsina State Sharia Court of Appeal which ruled that it violated Islamic law, and she later remarried.

== Background ==
Lawal was the second Nigerian woman condemned to death by stoning for engaging in sex before marriage. The first woman, Safiya Hussaini, had her sentence overturned in March 2002 on her first appeal. Sharia law was established in northern Nigeria's mostly Muslim state Zamfara in 2000 and has since spread to at least twelve other states.

== Appeals and acquittal ==
An appeal was put in motion and on 25 September 2003 Lawal's sentence of death by stoning for adultery was overturned by a five-judge panel of Katsina State Sharia Court of Appeal. Four of the five judges ruled that the conviction violated Islamic law on a number of points, which included: the defendant's right to proper legal defence was not ensured, the circumstantial evidence of her pregnancy was not sufficient, the confession of the accused was not valid, and only one instead of the required three judges was present at the time of conviction.

Baobab for Women's Human Rights, an NGO based in Nigeria, took up her case which was argued by Nigerian lawyers trained in both secular and Sharia law. Lawal's lawyers included Hauwa Ibrahim, a prominent human rights lawyer known for her pro bono work for people condemned under Sharia law. In their successful defence of Amina Lawal, lawyers used the notion of "extended pregnancy" (dormant foetus), arguing that under Sharia law, a five-year interval is possible between human conception and birth; two years prior to the date of her daughter's birth, she was still married to her husband.

== Reactions ==
The affair exposed civil and religious tensions between the Christian and Muslim regions of Nigeria. The sentence also caused widespread outrage in the West, and a number of campaigns were launched to persuade the Nigerian government to overturn the sentence. Several contestants of the Miss World beauty contest, to be held in Nigeria in 2002, pulled out of the contest to protest against Amina Lawal's treatment. Miss Norway condemned the sentence and called it “utterly revolting” and stated she would not attend until Lawal was acquitted. Miss Ivory Coast said, “[I am] not going to Nigeria, and I hope my decision will help save Amina Lawal.” Miss Togo added, “Stoning this woman is not right. All of society should rise up to end this sort of practice.” Several other beauty queens representing different countries also criticised the sentence and refused to compete. The Oprah Winfrey Show had a special report on Amina Lawal and encouraged viewers to send protest e-mails to the Nigerian Ambassador to the United States: over 1.2 million e-mails ensued.

Amnesty International had a solid response to the sentencing because Nigeria is a signatory of the legally binding international human rights Convention against Torture and Other Cruel, Inhuman or Degrading Treatment or Punishment. The organization also implored Nigeria to bring Sharia law in line with the 1999 Nigerian Constitution. However, Amnesty was unaware that this debate already existed in the religiously separated Nigeria.

United States President Bill Clinton pleaded to the Nigerian President Olusegun Obasanjo, “I hope and pray that the legal system will find a way to pardon a young woman convicted to death for bearing a child out of wedlock.” Obasanjo, as a Christian from the south of Nigeria, is likely to share his negative opinion of this sentencing, and his opinion or intervention would not be appreciated by the Muslim authorities in the northern region.

A 2002 Petition called "save Amina" gathered a few thousand signatures then a 2003 e-communication with the subject line "“Please Stop the International Amina Lawal Protest Letter Campaigns" signed by Ayesha Iman and Sindi Medar-Gould who represented two Nigerian Human Rights organizations said the "save Amina" petition had some inaccuracies including a false assertion that execution of the sentence was imminent. They further contested that "There is an unbecoming arrogance in assuming that international human rights organizations or others always know better than those directly involved, and therefore can take actions that fly in the face of their express wishes".

In May 2003, the official response of the Embassy of Nigeria in the Netherlands to the then Sharia-based trial of the State of Katsina in Nigeria, was that no court had given a stoning order on Lawal. They claimed the reports were "unfounded and malicious" and were "calculated to ridicule the Nigerian judicial system and the country's image before the international community." They claimed no knowledge of such a case.

Ambassador A.A. Agada of the Embassy of Nigeria in Washington D.C., U.S., was more forthcoming in recognizing the case of Lawal and stated on 29 August 2003: "the Embassy wishes to inform that Malama Amina Lawal has three levels of courts of appeal before the final determination of her case. The Embassy hereby assures the general public that Malama Lawal's right to a fair hearing under the Nigerian Constitution is guaranteed. Therefore due appellate processes will be followed to ensure the rule of law".

== In popular culture ==
As noted in the Author Q&A at the end of Will Ferguson's novel 419, the fictional character Amina—a young pregnant woman fleeing the Sharia states of northern Nigeria on foot—was based on Amina Lawal.

Alison M. Jaggar, an American philosopher, wrote an article in 2005 pertaining to this case, titled "Saving Amina".

== See also ==
- Sharia in Nigeria
