= Leila Alaoui =

French–Moroccan photographer and video artist (1982–2016)

- Born: 10 July 1982; Paris, France
- Died: 18 January 2016 (aged 33); Ouagadougou, Burkina Faso
- Education: Hofstra University; CUNY Graduate Center
- Known for: Photographer and video artist
- Website: www.fondationleilaalaoui.org

Leila Alaoui (10 July 1982 – 18 January 2016) was a French–Moroccan photographer and video artist. She worked as a commercial photographer for magazines and non-governmental organizations and completed assignments on refugees. Her work was exhibited widely and is held in the collection of Qatar Museums. Alaoui died from injuries suffered in a 2016 terrorist attack in Ouagadougou, Burkina Faso.

== Life and work ==
Alaoui was born in Paris to a Moroccan father and a French mother, and grew up in Marrakesh, Morocco. During her childhood and adolescence, she was regularly exposed to tragic stories of migrants drowning at sea while undertaking hazardous journeys, which she interpreted as stories of social injustice. When Alaoui turned 18, she moved to New York City to study photography at the Graduate Center of the City University of New York. She also attended Hofstra University from 2000 to 2003. Alaoui felt that studying in the United States allowed her to become "even more exposed to questions of belonging and identity construction". She returned to Morocco in 2008.

Alaoui believed that photography and art could be used for social activism, and should be used for "reflecting and questioning society". As a result, she chose to focus her work on social and national realities of cultural identity and diversity, migration and displacement. To do this, she used image creation, reports and studio video installations. One of her commonly used techniques was to set up a portable studio in a public place such as a market square and to invite interested passers-by to be photographed. Alaoui stated that her inspiration for this type of portrait photography came from Robert Frank's portrayal of Americans in the post-war era, such as in The Americans (1958). Alaoui often emphasizes her subjects, minimizing the background of some of her portraits.

Art critic Lara Atallah described her work as a "rebuke [of] the orientalist discourse", referring to the theory of Orientalism proposed by Edward Said.

Her photos were published in The New York Times and Vogue. She also completed assignments for the Spanish TV reality show El Mago. In 2013, she was commissioned by the Danish Refugee Council to create a series of portraits of refugees in Lebanon. The project was called Natreen ("We Wait"). In 2013, she created a video installation entitled Crossings, describing the journeys of Moroccans travelling to Europe. In 2015, she completed a photographic assignment "Everyday Heroes of Syria", in Lebanon, Jordan and Iraq, focusing on Syrians living in refugee settlements. The project was completed for the Danish Refugee Council, the European Commission Humanitarian Aid Office and ActionAid.

== Death ==
Alaoui was hired by UN Women and Amnesty International to work on a photographic assignment on women's rights in Burkina Faso. On January 16, 2016, during her first week working on the assignment, she was seriously wounded by gunshots while sitting in a parked car with her driver outside the Cappuccino café whilst gunmen attacked the Cappuccino and the Splendid Hotel. Mahamadi Ouédraogo, the driver, sustained critical injuries and died in the vehicle. Alaoui was quickly taken to a hospital and, following an operation, seemed initially to be in a stable condition. She died three days later of a heart attack. Her remains were flown to Morocco at the expense of King Mohammed VI of Morocco.

On her death, the director of the Maison européenne de la photographie and the president of Arab World Institute made a joint statement praising her work giving "a voice to the voiceless" and noting that she was "one of the most promising photographers of her generation".

== Legacy ==
The humanistic commitment displayed by Alaoui throughout her life and work led, after her death, to several tributes in Morocco, France, and many other countries. The 6th Marrakech Biennale (February–May 2016) was dedicated to her memory, as well as the 2nd Photography Biennale of the contemporary Arab world in Paris (2017).

Her family created the Leila Alaoui Foundation in March 2016 to preserve her work, defend her values, and inspire and support artists working to promote human dignity.

== Exhibitions ==
- Marrakesh Biennial, Morocco, 2012
- Marrakesh Biennial, Morocco, 2014
- Crossings, Marrakech Museum of Photography and Visual Arts, 2015; Cairo Video Festival, 2015
- Luxembourg Art Week, November 2015
- Biennale of Photography in the Contemporary Arab World, Paris, 2015

== Collections ==
Alaoui's work is held in the following public collection:

- Qatar Museums, Doha, Qatar
