= Moustapha Ould Limam Chafi =

Mauritanian politician

Advisor to Blaise Compaore
- In office 1990s–2014

Personal details
- Born: Guerou, Mauritania

Moustapha Ould Limam Chafi is a Mauritanian politician who served as a shadow advisor of various African presidents, and ran the "good offices" of Burkinabe president Blaise Compaoré. Chafi was also close with Malian president Amadou Toumani Touré, Nigerien president Mahamadou Issoufou, Guinean president Alpha Condé, Senegalese president Macky Sall, Togolese president Faure Gnassingbé, Bissauan president Umaro Sissoco Embaló, Rwandan president Paul Kagame, and Ivorian president Alassane Ouattara.

== Early life ==
Chafi was born into a Tadjakant family, a nomadic group from Assaba Region, and was born in the town of Guerou. Many Tadjakant, including some of Chafi's family, emigrated to the Democratic Republic of the Congo and Angola in search of work. Chafi's father Limam Chafi was a marabout and goldsmith who was close to the regime of Nigerien president Hamani Diori. Limam Chafi was strongly suspected of supporting a coup against Diori's successor Seyni Kountché.

In an interview, Moustapha Ould Limam Chafi stated that he started his diplomatic career very early with Armenian friends.

== Political career ==
Chafi became an advisor of Burkinabe president Blaise Compaoré in the early 1990s.

In 2003, Chafi was allegedly behind the 2003 Mauritanian coup attempt against Maaouya Ould Sid'Ahmed Taya. Chafi escaped a kidnapping attempt by Mauritanian services in early 2005 in Lomé for his role in the coup attempt.

Chafi spearheaded negotiations with Al-Qaeda in the Islamic Maghreb (AQIM) to secure the release of hostages Robert Fowler and his assistants in April 2009. He also participated in negotiations to release three Spanish aid workers captured by AQIM in November 2009. Chafi participated in negotiations to release Michel Germaneau, although Germaneau was killed by AQIM.

Chafi also helped evacuate Guinean dictator Moussa Dadis Camara to Rabat after an assassination attempt against him in 2009. During the 2014 Burkina Faso uprising, Chafi was flown to Abidjan on a plane chartered by the Ivorian presidency. Chafi's family now lives in Rabat, and he himself lives in Abidjan and Rabat.

Chafi is a fierce opponent of Mauritanian president Mohamed Ould Abdel Aziz, who he criticized for Aziz's strategy of fighting AQIM in 2012. Chafi served as an advisor to former Mauritanian president Sidi Ould Cheikh Abdallahi, and disliked Aziz's overthrow of Abdallahi in 2008. In 2011, Mauritanian authorities launched an investigation into four Mauritanian nationals including Chafi who they suspected of financing terrorism and communicating with terrorist groups.

In 2021, Nigerien president Mohamed Bazoum took on Chafi as an advisor. Chafi's role was to organize the Inclusive and Sovereign National Dialogue committee put on by the Chadian junta. Chafi participated in the council alongside several opponents to the junta, including Burkinabe Djibril Bassolé, Qatari National Security Adviser Mohamed bin Ahmed al-Misnad, and Chadian Foreign Affairs Minister Mahamat Zene Cherif.
