= Tilemsi Arabs =

The Tilemsi Arabs or Arabs of Gao, include Arabic-speaking populations in the northeastern region of the Niger Bend, near Gao. They are distinct from the other large group of Arabic speakers in Mali, the Bérabich, who are generally more educated and hold more pro-government views. The Lemhar Arabs are the largest tribe within Tilemsi Arabs, and are used as a catch-all term for the group. There are other Tilemsi Arab tribes, such as the Mechdouf. Both the Mechdouf and Lemhar have been in conflict since 2007, and both engage prominently in drug trafficking and ethnic militant groups in the Mali War.

== History ==
Historically, the Tilemsi Arabs have been vassals of the Kuntas Arabs. Tilemsi oral history states that the Tilemsi arrived in modern-day Mali just before French colonization, after being asked to immigrate by the Kuntas in their war against the Iwellemmedan. The names of the original Tilemsi émigrés descend from traditional Mauritanian names, but did not follow the Mauritanian naming system. After the war, the Tilemsi that stayed in Mali accepted a lower social caste than the Kuntas.

In Mali, as part of the "lahda" fraud of the 1970s, Kuntas employed Tilemsi Arabs to conduct illegal trade and smuggle goods across the Malian and Algerian borders. The Tilemsi earned enough money from the trade to overtake their former bosses economically. In 2000, the accumulated success from the Tilemsi Arabs caused tensions between the Tilemsi and the Kuntas. When a Tilemsi Arab ran in local elections in 2002, Tilemsi notables refused paying the jiziya, or tribute, to Kuntas. This led to a war between the Tilemsi and Kuntas that subsided in 2006.

Tilemsi Arabs are most numerous in the fourth district of Gao, which was built relatively recently. The term ahl al-gibla refers to Arabic speakers of Mauritanian origin who immigrated to Gao Region recently.

== Mechdouf Arabs ==
Mechdouf Arabs and Lemhar Arabs were allied against the Kuntas until 2005, when a split resulting from drug trafficking intensified over the Mechdouf enjoying preference in government positions during the Amadou Toumani Touré. This split between Mechdouf and Lemhar contributed to the split in pro-government and pro-rebel factions of the Arab Movement of Azawad. Some Mechdouf Arabs also live in Mauritania. In Mali, they are considered a "warrior tribe."

== Lemhar Arabs ==
Lemhar Arabs are established in the Tilemsi valley near Gao, and have been known their activity in the drug-trafficking industry and connections with Islamist groups during the Mali War. When the Movement for Oneness and Jihad in West Africa captured swathes of Gao Region in 2012, it sought significant support from Lemhar Arabs amidst ethnic conflict with the National Movement for the Liberation of Azawad, which was composed predominantly of Tuaregs and to a smaller extent, Kuntas. Despite the end of the war between Kuntas and Lemhars, tensions were still high between the two groups. In January 2010, Lemhars assassinated Sidi al-Mokhtar al-Kunti, the head of the Kuntas in Gao Region, after a Kunta attack on a drug convoy run by Lemhars.

=== Drug trafficking in the Lemhar community ===
Many Lemhar Arab notables who got rich off the drug trade live in an affluent district of Gao known as Cocainebougou, or "Cocaineville". One of the richest and most notable Lemhars, Baba Ould Cheikh, was the former mayor of Tarkint and was involved the Air Cocaine scandal in the late 2000s. Other notable Lemhar personalities such as Cherif Ould Taher, Mohamed Ould Ahmed Deya, and Sultan Ould Bady. These traffickers often operate under names like "Nour Transport", "Tilemsi Transport", and "Antilope Tea."

=== Connections between jihadist groups and Lemhar Arabs ===
Cheikh was in close contact with Al-Qaeda in the Islamic Maghreb in the 2000s and early 2010s, and served as a mediator between the group and European nations following the kidnapping of European nationals in Algeria in 2003. He also served as a mediator in negotiations for the release of Canadian diplomat Robert Fowler, connecting Burkinabe official Moustapha Ould Limam Chafi with Mokhtar Belmokhtar.

When jihadist groups like AQIM, Ansar Dine, and MOJWA took control of northern Malian cities at the start of the Mali War, many Lemhar traffickers aligned with them to protect their businesses and settle the dispute with the Kuntas. Ahmed al-Tilemsi notably fought for these groups to protect his drug trafficking business. The core of MOJWA consisted of Lemhars until July 2012, when the group attempted to recruit from other ethnic groups. The main financiers of these groups were drug traffickers such as Taher and Deya. Other Lemhar notables not connected the drug trade such as Bourem deputy Mohamed Ould Mataly, joined the jihadist groups after their takeover of Gao.

Some former members of MUJAO, spearheaded by Lemhar Yoro Ould Daha, defected to the pro-government faction of the Arab Movement of Azawad.

== Notable Lemhar Arabs ==
- Baba Ould Cheikh, drug trafficker and jihadist financier
- Hanoun Ould Ali, member of pro-government MAA faction
- Cherif Ould Taher, drug trafficker and jihadist financier
- Mohamed Ould Mataly, deputy of Bourem
- Yoro Ould Daha, leader of MAA pro-government faction and former chief of Islamic Police of Gao
- Ahmed al-Tilemsi, co-founder of MOJWA and drug trafficker
- Ould Meydou, Malian general
