= Human trafficking in Ivory Coast =

Ivory Coast has been used as a source, transit, and destination country for women and children trafficked for the purposes of forced labour and commercial sexual exploitation.

In 2010, trafficking within the country's borders was more prevalent, with victims primarily trafficked from the north of the country to the more economically prosperous south. Boys from Ghana, Mali, and Burkina Faso were subjected to forced labour in the agricultural sector, including on cocoa, coffee, pineapple, and rubber plantations; boys from Ghana were forced to labour in the mining sector; boys from Togo were forced to work in construction; and boys from Benin were forced to work in carpentry and construction. Girls recruited from Ghana, Togo, and Benin to work as domestic servants and street vendors often were subjected to conditions of forced labour. Women and girls were also recruited from Ghana and Nigeria to work as waitresses in restaurants and bars and were subsequently subjected to forced prostitution. Trafficked children often faced harsh treatment and extreme working conditions.

In 2010, the government of Ivory Coast did not fully comply with the minimum standards for the elimination of trafficking; however, it made significant efforts to do so. Despite these significant efforts, such as the conviction of one sex trafficker, the government's overall efforts to combat trafficking were limited and ineffective; therefore, Ivory Coast was placed on Tier 2 Watch List for a third consecutive year. The government remained hampered by the absence of a cohesive government, limited resources, and insufficient knowledge of the human trafficking phenomenon among law enforcement officials and judges. The country had never reported a prosecution of forced child labour in the agricultural sector. Police demonstrated a weak understanding of human trafficking by characterising children found in a brothel raid as "voluntary prostitutes", rather than presumptive victims of human trafficking. Ivory Coast also failed to investigate for a third consecutive year. NGO reports that police harass undocumented foreign women in prostitution by demanding sex in exchange for not arresting them.

The Ivory Coast ratified the 2000 UN TIP Protocol in October 2012. The U.S. State Department's Office to Monitor and Combat Trafficking in Persons placed the country in "Tier 2" in 2017 and 2023. In 2023, the Organised Crime Index noted that most trafficking involved Nigerian nationals.

== Prosecution (2010) ==
The government of Ivory Coast legal statutes do not prohibit all forms of trafficking, and there is no specific law punishing such offences. However, Penal Code Article 378 prohibits forced labour, prescribing a sufficiently stringent penalty of one to five years’ imprisonment and a fine of approximately $800 to $2,200. Penal Code Article 376 criminalizes entering into contracts that deny freedom to a third person, prescribing a sufficiently stringent punishment of five to 10 years imprisonment and a fine. Penal Code Articles 335 to 337 prohibit recruiting or offering children for prostitution, prescribing penalties of one to ten years’ imprisonment and a fine; these penalties are sufficiently stringent, but not commensurate with penalties prescribed for other serious offences, such as rape. Ivorian law does not criminalize the trafficking of adults for commercial sexual exploitation.

During the reporting period, the government convicted one trafficking offender. A Nigerian woman promised two girls from Nigeria a trip to the United States, but instead transported them to Ivory Coast and forced them to engage in prostitution. In May 2009, a court in Daloa convicted and sentenced the trafficker to three years’ imprisonment and a $2,000 fine, and the Nigerian Embassy in Abidjan assisted the victims in returning home. The following child trafficking cases were also identified and investigated by law enforcement agencies during the reporting period.

In February 2009, Nigerian traffickers promised jobs in Germany to four Nigerian girls ages 16 to 19, but transported them to Ivory Coast and forced them into prostitution in Vaou; the traffickers evaded capture. In June 2009, police in Soubre intercepted 15 Burkinabe children who were being transported by bus to Ivory Coast for the purpose of labour exploitation and returned them to their parents; the traffickers eluded capture. In September 2009, a female restaurant owner lured two girls, aged 13 and 17, to Odienne with a promise of jobs, but forced them into prostitution. Gendarmes arrested the restaurant owner, but later released her after she paid a fine of about $100 to the victims’ families.

== Protection (2010) ==
The Ivorian government made inadequate efforts to protect victims of trafficking during the last year. Law enforcement authorities did not demonstrate adequate efforts to proactively identify trafficking victims among vulnerable groups, such as foreign children entering the country without their parents, though some victims were identified during the year. During the reporting period, the government did not offer any specialized training to law enforcement and immigration personnel on identifying and treating victims of trafficking. However, in partnership with the ILO, the Ministry of Family held a workshop for 25 families who volunteered to take in trafficking victims intercepted in their communities. The government had no care facilities for foreign or domestic trafficking victims. There was no witness protection or restitution program for trafficking victims. The government neither encouraged nor discouraged victims from assisting in the investigation and prosecution of trafficking offenses. The Ministry of Family identified some existing government structures that could be converted to shelters, and in the meantime referred victims to NGOs that offered suitable lodging. While the Ministry of Family and the National Police employed a small team of social workers to assist trafficking victims after they were identified, the government relied on NGOs for medical and psychological assistance to victims, giving the organizations no financial or material support in return.

The Ministry of Family had responsibility for seeking temporary residency status in Ivory Coast for victims who did not want to return home. During the reporting period, the ministry assisted in the repatriation of 20 trafficked children, including nine from Ivory Coast, two from Burkina Faso, three from Benin, three from Ghana, and three from Togo. All of the children had been forced to work in the informal sector. In June 2009, Ivorian police participated in a foreign law enforcement agency-funded raid on farms growing cocoa and palms in the Aboisso area, discovering more than 50 children working on the premises. Ivorian officials determined that four of these children were trafficking victims and returned three to their families, while transferring the fourth to the Ministry of Family for care. Following raids on brothels and bars, police vice squad members asked women in prostitution if they were victims of traffickers, but did not investigate further if the answer was negative. Regulations protected child victims by not permitting police to interview suspected child victims without a case worker present. Child victims were assigned a Ministry of Family case worker with responsibility for informing victims about judicial proceedings, and these case workers allowed children to decide whether they wished to testify against their alleged traffickers.

== Prevention (2010) ==
The Ivorian government demonstrated and sustained modest efforts to prevent trafficking during the reporting period, primarily through public awareness campaigns, which the Ministry of Family estimated reached 11,000 residents of the country. The Ministry of Interior disseminated anti-trafficking awareness materials to police and gendarmes at border points, along with guidance on investigating those who were attempting to bring children into Ivory Coast. In an effort to reduce demand for commercial sex acts, police continued periodic raids on brothels and bars suspected of exploiting children in the sex trade. Ivory Coast is not a party to the 2000 UN TIP Protocol.
