= 2016 Ouagadougou attacks =

Islamic terrorist attack in Burkina Faso

2016 Ouagadougou Islamic terrorist attacks
- Part of the Islamist insurgency in Burkina Faso, the War in the Sahel, and the Insurgency in the Maghreb (2002–present)
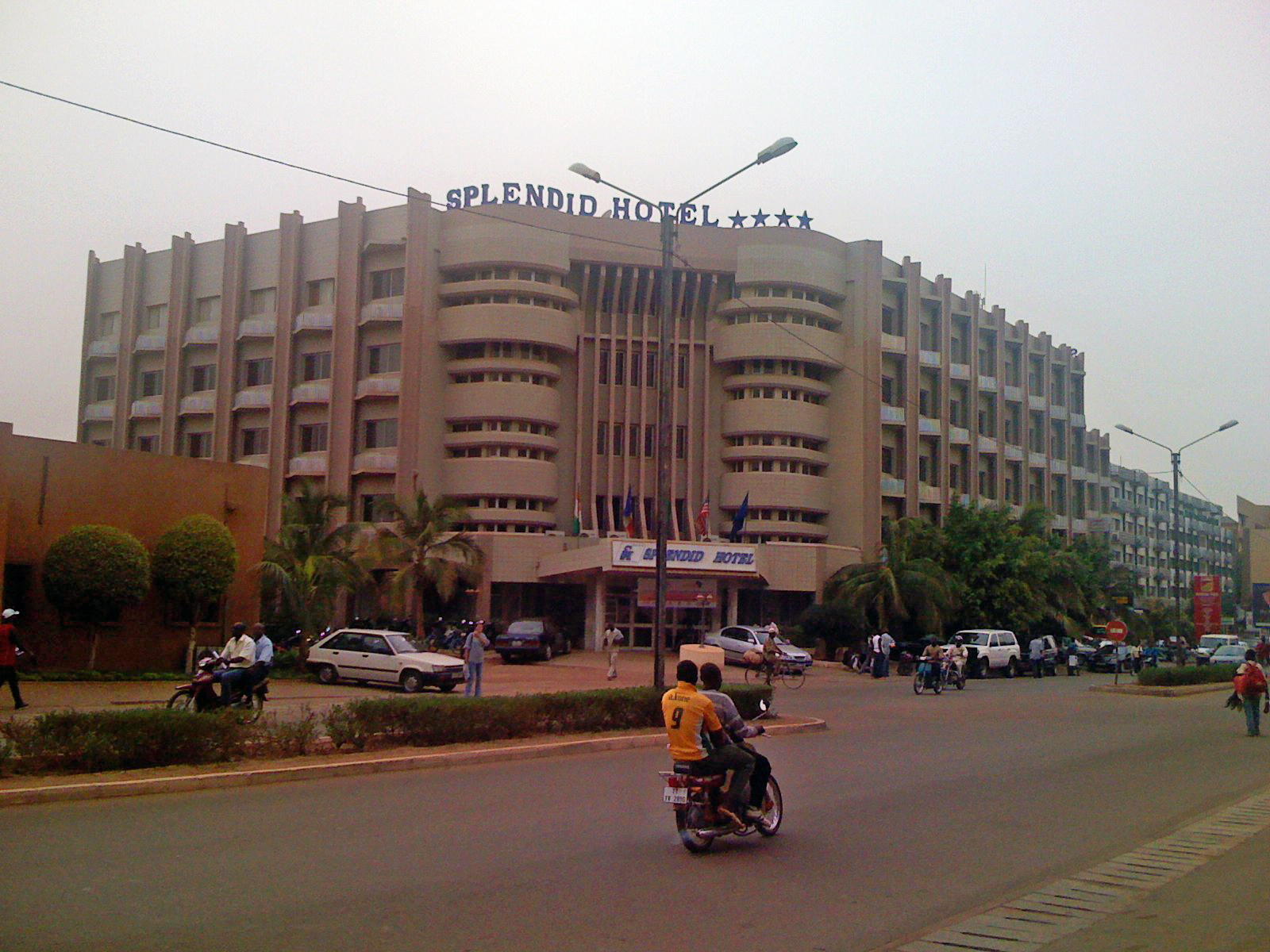
- The Splendid Hotel in 2008

- Location: 12°21′40″N 1°31′05″W; Ouagadougou, Burkina Faso
- Date: 15–16 January 2016; 19:30 – ~next morning (GMT)
- Target: Cappuccino restaurant, Splendid Hotel and Yibi hotel with Westerners (Alleged)
- Attack type: Mass shooting, arson, hostage-taking, sieges, counter-attack
- Deaths: 34 (including four attackers)
- Injuries: 56+ (including some hostages during the rescue)
- Victims: 176 hostages (rescued)
- Perpetrators: Al-Qaeda in the Islamic Maghreb; Al-Mourabitoun
- No. of participants: 6–7 (4 dead, 2–3 on the run)
- Motive: Islamic terrorism

On 15 January 2016, gunmen armed with heavy weapons attacked the Cappuccino restaurant and the Splendid Hotel in the heart of Ouagadougou, the capital of Burkina Faso. At least 30 people were killed, and 56 wounded; a total of 176 hostages were released after a government counter-attack into the next morning as the siege ended. Three perpetrators were also killed. The nearby YIBI hotel was then under siege, where another attacker was killed. Notably, former Swiss MPs Jean-Noël Rey and Georgie Lamon were killed at a restaurant during the attack. Responsibility for the attack was claimed by Al-Qaeda in the Islamic Maghreb (AQIM) and Al-Mourabitoun.

== Background ==
Following the Libyan Civil War, neighboring Mali was wracked by instability, including Islamist attacks, in the Northern Mali conflict. Neighboring countries also experienced a Boko Haram insurgency.

In Burkina Faso, the 2014 Burkinabé uprising ousted President Blaise Compaoré, while the consequent 2015 Burkinabe coup d'état, in relation to the electoral process, was eventually put down under pressure from the African Union. The November 2015 general election resulted in Roch Marc Christian Kaboré becoming president of Burkina Faso. Burkina Faso is part of the G5 Sahel countries formed to counter insurgent attacks. The Splendid Hotel was sometimes used by French troops who were part of the Chad-based Operation Barkhane. The United States had approximately 75 military personnel in the country, including 15 assigned to the embassy and about 60 who provide "security assistance" – training, advising and assisting.

Earlier in the day, at about 14:00 local time, approximately 20 "heavily-armed unidentified individuals" attacked gendarmerie in the village of Tin Abao, near the border with Mali, according to the army. The Security Ministry's Spokeswoman Abi Ouattara also announced that an Austrian couple were kidnapped in the night in northern Burkina Faso near the border with Mali in the Baraboulé area's village of Djibo. Austrian Foreign Ministry Spokesman Thomas Schnoell added that more information was not known but they were "looking into the matter as quickly as possible." However, the couple were later said to be Australian.

== Attacks and sieges ==
=== Cappuccino and Splendid Hotel ===
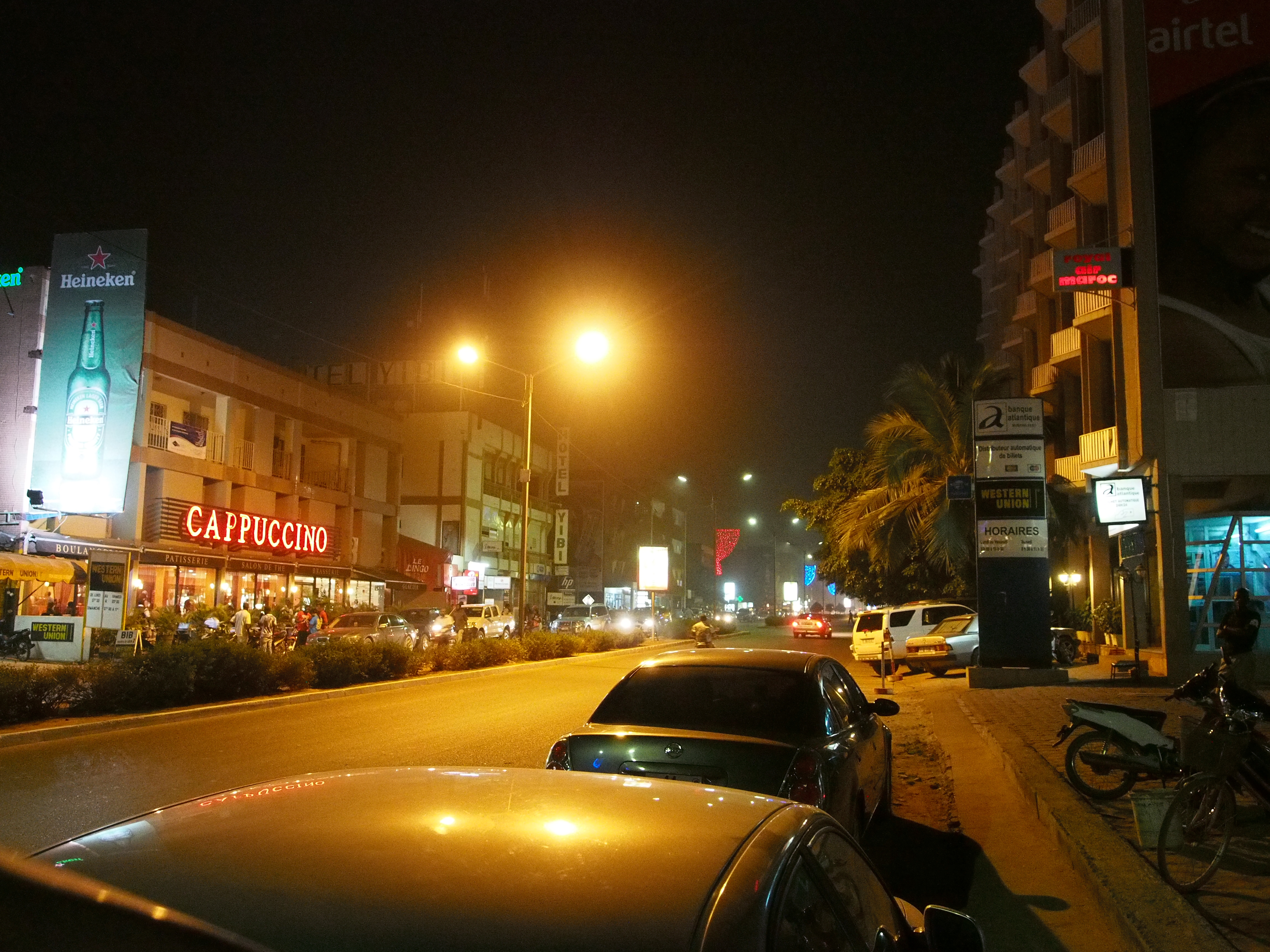
The Cappuccino restaurant in 2012.

On 15 January 2016 at 19:30, according to Communications Minister Remi Dandjinou, six or seven turbaned gunmen, reportedly arrived in four-wheel drive cars and burnt ten vehicles. They attacked the Cappuccino restaurant, which had about 100 guests, according to RTB, and then took hostages at the 147-room four-star Splendid Hotel in the heart of Ouagadougou on Avenue Kwame Nkrumah. Both places are frequented by businessmen and foreigners. A dinner of the ASECNA, which was attended by 200 people, was taking place in the hotel. Some of the perpetrators arrived at the hotel during the day and mingled with guests, while others joined them after nightfall. As Ouagadougou Airport is about 1.5 kilometres (1 mi) from the attack site, Air France and Turkish Airlines flights were diverted to Niamey, Niger.

Foreign Minister Alpha Barry said: "We know that there are victims and there are hostages. Currently the area is blocked by security forces waiting for an assault to free the hostages." According to the head of the city's main hospital there were 20 confirmed deaths, while an unnamed Cappuccino staff member said several people had been killed at the restaurant. At least 20 people were wounded. Robert Sangare, director of Ouagadougou's university hospital centre, said that one European woman being treated at the hospital had said that the perpetrators appeared to target white people. Other survivors, including a Slovenian social anthropologist and a French architect, also reported witnessing white people being "singled out" and double tapped by the attackers. About 10 ambulances were used to ferry the wounded to the hospital through the night.

==== Counter-attack ====
At 01:00 the next day, the hall was set on fire as commandos tried to free an unknown number of hostages, using explosives to enter the building. Two groups of security forces entered the main lobby five hours after the siege began, as gunfire was reported. RTB reported intense gunfire for 40 minutes in the direction of the hotel. It further noted that about 33 hostages had been freed by security forces, including Minister of Public Services, Labour and Social Security Clément Sawadogo, according to Dandjinou. Gunfire reportedly subsided after an hour of the counter-attack, while bodies were seen outside the hotel. The Splendid Hotel siege ended in the morning with the release of 176 hostages, according to Compoare, almost half of whom were injured in the process.

A group of U.S. and French soldiers came to the site, while a curfew was instated from 23:00 to 06:00. An unnamed U.S. Defence Department official said that France had requested its intelligence surveillance and reconnaissance support in the city and that at least one military member in the country was giving "advice and assistance" to French forces at the hotel. Dozens of the French forces came in from neighbouring Mali. French medical teams were sent to provide support, while forensic officers were also sent to the city.

=== YIBI hotel ===
Following the end of the siege at the Splendid Hotel, the Yibi hotel, located next to Cappuccino, was under attack, according to Interior Minister Simon Compaoré. It followed him saying that nearby hotels were being checked to make sure attackers were not hiding there. At about 07:30, government forces entered the hotel on foot, while sharp shooters were reportedly on the roofs of nearby buildings. Radio Omega reported that a fourth attacker had been killed after seeking refuge at the hotel.

== Casualties ==
Deaths by nationality
Country	Number	Note
Burkina Faso	10	
Canada	6	
Ukraine	4	
France	2	
Switzerland	2	
Italy	1	
Portugal	1	
France/Morocco	1	
United States	1	
Netherlands	1	
Libya	1	
Total	30	

The gunmen were initially reported to have killed 20 people, but this number was later revised upward to a total of 30 people with one death in the second hotel; at least 56 other people were injured. Three militants were also killed at the first hotel and one in the second hotel. Ten bodies were found at the Cappuccino across the street from the hotel by firefighters. One of the hostages was an Indian citizen, while at least one of the other wounded was French and another was from the U.S.

The dead were initially reported to be from 18 countries. These included: eight people from Burkina Faso, six Canadians, four of whom were members of the same family from Lac-Beauport, Quebec, another family friend and a member of their visiting party, four Ukrainians of the same family, two each from Switzerland and France, and one each from Portugal, the Netherlands, Italy, Libya and the United States. The latter was working for the Christian group Sheltering Wings. A dual French-Moroccan victim, who was shot multiple times, died in an Ouagadougou hospital three days later. She was Leila Alaoui, a photographer on assignment for Amnesty International.

The two Swiss dead were Georgie Lamon, a former cantonal member of parliament, and Jean-Noël Rey, a former Swiss member of parliament and head of the Swiss post and telecommunications service. Both had been visiting a school created by an association to which they belonged.

== Responsibility ==
Al-Qaeda in the Islamic Maghreb, an Islamist militant organization whose ultimate goal is to overthrow the Algerian government and create an Islamic State in its place, claimed responsibility for the attack. SITE Intelligence Group translated a document that outlined the reason for the attack "revenge against France and the disbelieving West" and that the militants were part of the Mali-based Al-Mourabitoun group. It also quoted a statement from the group as reading: "[The] mujahideen brothers...broke into a restaurant of one of the biggest hotels in the capital of Burkina Faso, and are now entrenched and the clashes are continuing with the enemies of the religion." The group also "asserted the fall of many dead Crusaders." Eyewitnesses said the perpetrators were "light-skinned" and spoke a language not native to the country. Later, two of the attackers were found to be black and one Arab. Of the initially reported six gunmen, at least two of the four perpetrators found were women, according to an announcement by Kaboré. Compoare added that the bodies of three "very young" attackers were found and that they were no older than 26 years old. It was reported on 22 January that three of the six attackers were still on the run.

== Reactions ==
=== Domestic ===
President Roch Marc Christian Kaboré presided over an emergency cabinet meeting and then, along with Prime Minister Paul Kaba Thieba arrived at the attack scene at about lunchtime. Kaboré said it was "a barbaric attack that we must fight." National mourning was observed for 72 hours.

=== International ===
The French embassy announced that a "terrorist attack" was underway and urged its citizens to avoid the area. It added that it had no idea if there were any French citizens inside the hotel. The U.S. embassy issued a statement on Twitter indicating that while it was aware of the situation, there was no indication of any citizens inside the hotel and also urged its citizens to avoid the downtown area of Ouagadougou. The British Foreign and Commonwealth Office issued a similar advisory. French President François Hollande issued a statement early in the morning of 16 January that read: "The President of the Republic expresses his total support for President Kaboré and for the people of Burkina Faso in the face of this odious and cowardly attack which has struck Ouagadougou." Prime Minister Manuel Valls added on Twitter: "By striking Burkina Faso, terrorists have again struck the world. Together we will respond and we will overcome. #JeSuisOuaga" President of the National Assembly of Ivory Coast Guillaume Soro expressed his "compassion and solidarity" to the "government and people." Russia's Ministry of Foreign Affairs condemned the attacks. In announcing the deaths of his fellow citizens, Canadian Prime Minister Justin Trudeau condemned "these senseless acts of violence on innocent civilians." Reporting that Ukrainians were killed, Minister of Foreign Affairs of Ukraine Pavlo Klimkin stated that he was "shocked by the attack" that was "a tragedy for all of us..." U.S. State Department Spokesman John Kirby later offered condolences on the death of his fellow citizen and added that his family "are with all those affected by this brutality." The U.S. embassy called it a "senseless assault on innocent people." Regional neighbor Algeria's Foreign Minister Ramtane Lamamra also condemned the attacks and expressed its solidarity with the families of the victims, the government and the Burkinabé people. Ghana's President John Mahama appointed his former chief of staff, Prosper Douglas Bani, as interior minister to reinforce domestic security following the attacks.

== See also ==
- 2008 Mumbai attacks
- 2015 Corinthia Hotel attack
- 2015 Bamako hotel attack
- Garissa University College attack
- List of Islamist terrorist attacks
- List of terrorist incidents, January–June 2016
- Westgate shopping mall attack
- 2016 Bamako attack
