= Deaths in January 2016 =

The following is a list of notable deaths in January 2016.

Entries for each day are listed alphabetically by surname. A typical entry lists information in the following sequence:

- Name, age, country of citizenship and reason for notability, established cause of death, reference.

== January 2016 ==
=== 1 ===
- Gerald M. Ackerman, 87, American art historian and educator.
- Natasha Aguilar, 45, Costa Rican swimmer, silver and bronze medalist at the 1987 Pan American Games, complications from a stroke.
- George Alexandru, 58, Romanian theater and film actor, complications from an abdominal infection.
- Fazu Aliyeva, 83, Russian Avar poet and journalist, heart failure.
- Lennie Bluett, 96, American actor (Gone with the Wind, Mighty Joe Young, A Star is Born).
- Dale Bumpers, 90, American politician, Governor of Arkansas (1971–1975), Senator from Arkansas (1975–1999).
- Antonio Carrizo, 89, Argentine broadcaster.
- Delia Córdova, 62, Peruvian Olympic volleyball player.
- Maria Gąsienica Daniel-Szatkowska, 79, Polish Olympic alpine skier.
- Jacques Deny, 99, French mathematician.
- Gail Fullerton, 88, American academic administrator.
- Brian Johns, 79, Australian company director, managing director of the Australian Broadcasting Corporation (1995–2000), cancer.
- Gilbert Kaplan, 74, American conductor and businessman, cancer.
- Helmut Koester, 89, German-born American history professor.
- Tony Lane, 71, American art director (Rolling Stone), brain cancer.
- Mark B, 45, British hip-hop record producer.
- Gilberto Mendes, 93, Brazilian composer.
- John Coleman Moore, 92, American mathematician.
- Homa Nategh, 81, Iranian educator and historian.
- Mike Oxley, 71, American politician, member of the United States House of Representatives from Ohio's 4th congressional district (1981–2007), lung cancer.
- Jean Pedersen, 81, American mathematician.
- Ian Pieris, 82, Sri Lankan cricketer (Cambridge University Cricket Club).
- Jim Ross, 89, Scottish-born Canadian ice hockey player (New York Rangers).
- Anil Salgaocar, 75, Indian executive and politician.
- Fred Wiedersporn, 84, German Olympic gymnast.
- Vilmos Zsigmond, 85, Hungarian-American cinematographer (Close Encounters of the Third Kind, The Deer Hunter, McCabe & Mrs. Miller), Oscar winner (1978).

=== 2 ===
- Faris al-Zahrani, 38, Saudi al-Qaeda member, execution by beheading.
- Mieke Andela-Baur, 92, Dutch politician, member of the House of Representatives.
- Marcel Barbeau, 90, Canadian painter and sculptor.
- Ardhendu Bhushan Bardhan, 91, Indian politician, General Secretary of the Communist Party of India (1996–2012), complications from a stroke.
- Vicente Camacho, 86, Northern Mariana Islands businessman and politician, member of the Marianas Political Status Commission.
- Michel Delpech, 69, French singer-songwriter and actor, throat cancer.
- Leonard Evans, 86, Canadian politician, complications from a heart attack.
- Tim Francis, 87, New Zealand diplomat, Ambassador to the United States (1988–1991), Administrator of Tokelau (1984–1988), cancer.
- Brad Fuller, 62, American video game composer (Marble Madness, Tetris, Blasteroids), Director of Engineering for Atari (1993–1996), pancreatic cancer.
- Maria Garbowska-Kierczyńska, 93, Polish actress.
- Matt Hobden, 22, English cricketer (Sussex), fall.
- Matthiew Klinck, 37, Canadian film director and producer (Hank and Mike), stabbed.
- Thomas Johnstone McWiggan, 97, British aviation engineer.
- Gisela Mota Ocampo, 33, Mexican politician, Mayor of Temixco (2016), member of the Chamber of Deputies (2012–2015), shot.
- Nimr al-Nimr, 56, Saudi Shia religious leader, execution by beheading.
- John Reid, 87, Australian Anglican prelate, Bishop of South Sydney (1972–1993).
- Frederic Remington, 86, American politician.
- Rino Salviati, 93, Italian singer, guitarist and actor.
- Kaneko Shigeji, 84, Japanese boxer, OPBF featherweight champion (1953 - 1958), pneumonia.
- Stanley Siegel, 79, American talk show host, pneumonia.
- Fateh Singh, 51, Indian sports shooter and army officer, shot.
- Mirko Vujačić, 91, Montenegrin Olympic athlete.
- Frances Cress Welsing, 80, American psychiatrist and author, complications from a stroke.
- Leonard White, 99, British television producer (The Avengers, Armchair Theatre) and actor.
- Sabri Yirmibeşoğlu, 87, Turkish military officer, Secretary-General of the National Security Council (1988–1990), kidney failure.

=== 3 ===
- Klaas Bakker, 89, Dutch footballer (Ajax).
- Robert H. B. Baldwin, 95, American businessman (Morgan Stanley), pneumonia.
- Leonard Berkowitz, 89, American social psychologist.
- Paul Bley, 83, Canadian jazz pianist.
- Gary Flakne, 81, American politician, member of the Minnesota House of Representatives (1963–1973).
- Amby Fogarty, 82, Irish footballer (Sunderland, Hartlepool, Cork Celtic) and manager (Cork Hibernians, Galway Rovers).
- C. B. Forgotston, 70, American lawyer and political blogger, suicide by gunshot.
- Cristina Grado, 76, Italian actress and voice actress.
- Demmus Hentze, 92, Faroese politician, Finance Minister (1975–1981).
- John McDade Howell, 93, American academic and university chancellor (East Carolina University).
- Shankar Prasad Jaiswal, 83, Indian politician.
- Alberto Iniesta Jiménez, 92, Spanish Roman Catholic prelate, Auxiliary Bishop of Madrid (1972–1998).
- Raymond W. Lessard, 85, American Roman Catholic prelate, Bishop of Savannah (1973–1995).
- Marvin S. Lieberman, 82, American politician.
- Gomer Lloyd, 68, British Olympic bobsledder.
- Raghu Nandan Mandal, 63, Indian politician.
- Andy Maurer, 67, American football player (Atlanta Falcons, Minnesota Vikings, Denver Broncos), cancer.
- Peter Naur, 87, Danish computer science pioneer, Turing Award winner.
- Georg Nees, 89, German academic and artist.
- Bill Plager, 70, Canadian ice hockey player (St. Louis Blues).
- Peter Powell, 83, English kite maker, stroke.
- Tommy Sale, 97, English rugby league player (Leigh, Widnes).
- Igor Sergun, 58, Russian military officer, Director of the GRU (since 2011).
- Ted Stanley, 84, American philanthropist and businessman (Danbury Mint).
- Fridolin Sulser, 89, Swiss-born American pharmacologist.

=== 4 ===
- Tom Allin, 28, English cricketer (Warwickshire), suicide by jumping.
- Frank Armitage, 91, Australian-born American painter and animator (Mary Poppins, Lady and the Tramp, The Jungle Book).
- Jan Aronsson, 84, Swedish footballer (Degerfors IF).
- Robert Balser, 88, American animator (Yellow Submarine, Heavy Metal, The Jackson 5ive), respiratory failure.
- Fernando Barrachina, 68, Spanish footballer (Valencia CF).
- Eugene J. Bedell, 87, American politician.
- Stephen W. Bosworth, 76, American diplomat, Ambassador to South Korea (1997–2001), prostate cancer.
- John A. Busterud, 94, American politician.
- Colin Butler, 102, British entomologist.
- Rūsiņš Mārtiņš Freivalds, 73, Latvian computer scientist and mathematician, heart attack.
- Michel Galabru, 93, French actor (The Judge and the Assassin, La Cage aux Folles, Belle Époque).
- Long John Hunter, 84, American blues guitarist and singer-songwriter.
- S. H. Kapadia, 68, Indian judge, Chief Justice (2010–2012).
- Jorge Lepra, 73, Uruguayan diplomat and politician, heart failure.
- Maja Maranow, 54, German actress (Beloved Sisters), breast cancer.
- Achim Mentzel, 69, German musician and television presenter.
- Red Parker, 84, American football coach (The Citadel, Clemson, Ole Miss).
- Donald J. Parsons, 93, American Episcopal prelate, Bishop of Quincy (1973–1988).
- Marjorie Pizer, 95, Australian poet.
- Joseph Ritz, 86, American author and playwright.
- John Roberts, 69, Welsh footballer (Arsenal, Birmingham, Wrexham).
- Andres Rodriguez, 31, Venezuelan equestrian competitor, silver medalist at the 2015 Pan American Games, traffic collision.
- Leo Rucka, 84, American football player (San Francisco 49ers).
- Gavriel Salomon, 77, Israeli educational psychologist.
- Alexander O. Shirley, 88, British Virgin Islands civil servant and cricketer, Accountant General (1967–1987), namesake of the A. O. Shirley Recreation Ground.
- Antonio Soto Díaz, 66, Puerto Rican politician, member of the Puerto Rico Senate (2009–2011), heart attack.
- Robert Stigwood, 81, Australian band manager (Bee Gees) and film producer (Grease, Saturday Night Fever).
- Edhi Sunarso, 83, Indonesian sculptor (Selamat Datang Monument), heart failure.
- André Turcat, 94, French aviator.

=== 5 ===
- Mamdouh Abdel-Alim, 59, Egyptian actor, heart attack.
- Stanford Anderson, 81, American architectural historian.
- Bob Armstrong, 82, American basketball player (Philadelphia Warriors).
- María Lorenza Barreneche, 89, Argentine socialite, First Lady (1983–1989).
- Pierre Boulez, 90, French composer and conductor.
- Nash Candelaria, 87, American author.
- Agapito Robleda Castro, 83, Honduran politician.
- Patrick Crofton, 80, Canadian politician.
- Christine Lawrence Finney, 47, American painter and animator (Aladdin, The Lion King, Lilo & Stitch).
- John Freebairn, 85, Australian politician, member of the South Australian House of Assembly for Light (1962–1970).
- Percy Freeman, 70, English footballer (Lincoln City, West Bromwich Albion, Reading).
- Albert Gubay, 87, British businessman (Kwik Save).
- Rudolf Haag, 93, German theoretical physicist.
- Lev Nikolayevich Korolyov, 89, Russian computer scientist.
- Jean-Paul L'Allier, 77, Canadian politician, member of the National Assembly of Quebec (1970–1976), Mayor of Quebec City (1989–2005).
- George MacIntyre, 76, American football player and coach (Vanderbilt).
- Tancrède Melet, 32, French tightrope walker and base jumper, fall.
- Gerry O'Malley, 87, Irish Gaelic footballer (Roscommon).
- Uche Okeke, 82, Nigerian artist.
- Antônio Pompêo, 62, Brazilian actor.
- Michael Purcell, 70, Australian rugby union player.
- Jay Ritchie, 79, American baseball player (Boston Red Sox, Atlanta Braves, Cincinnati Reds).
- Anatoly Roshchin, 83, Russian heavyweight wrestler, Olympic champion (1972).
- Elizabeth Swados, 64, American composer and writer (Runaways), complications from surgery.
- Keith Thiele, 94, New Zealand World War II pilot.
- Alex Timpson, 69, British children's rights activist.
- Nuri Turan, 91, Turkish Olympic athlete.
- Hanna-Marie Weydahl, 93, Norwegian pianist.

=== 6 ===
- Nancy Abelmann, 56, American anthropologist.
- Robert D. Acland, 74, American surgeon (Acland's Video Atlas of Human Anatomy).
- Maliheh Afnan, 81, Palestinian-born artist.
- Alfredo "Chocolate" Armenteros, 87, Cuban trumpeter, prostate cancer.
- Ladislav Bačík, 82, Czech Olympic swimmer.
- Douglas Greer, 94, American actor (Our Gang).
- Pat Harrington Jr., 86, American actor (One Day at a Time, Captain Caveman and the Teen Angels, The Inspector), complications from a brain haemorrhage.
- Florence King, 80, American writer.
- Serena Sinclair Lesley, 89, American journalist.
- Hayes McClerkin, 84, American politician.
- Christy O'Connor Jnr, 67, Irish golfer.
- Silvana Pampanini, 90, Italian actress (The Road a Year Long, The City Stands Trial, A Husband for Anna).
- Ioannis Petridis, 84, Greek politician, MP for Pieria (1985–1989).
- Sol Polansky, 89, American diplomat, Ambassador to Bulgaria (1987–1990).
- Qian Min, 100, Chinese politician.
- Marion Studholme, 88, English soprano and music teacher.
- Nivaria Tejera, 86, Cuban poet and novelist, pancreatic cancer.
- Labhshankar Thakar, 80, Indian author.
- Robert D. Timm, 94, American politician.
- Yves Vincent, 94, French actor.
- Zbigniew Zychowicz, 62, Polish politician, Marshal of West Pomeranian Voivodeship (1999–2000).

=== 7 ===
- Oscar Ray Bolin, 53, American serial killer, execution by lethal injection.
- Brahim Chergui, 94, Algerian militant.
- Patrick Connolly, 88, Irish lawyer, Attorney General (1982).
- André Courrèges, 92, French fashion designer.
- Robert M. Cundick, 89, American organist and composer.
- Paddy Doherty, 89, Northern Irish civil rights activist.
- Michael J. Egan, 89, American politician.
- Bill Foster, 86, American college basketball coach (Rutgers, Utah, Duke, South Carolina).
- Joaquín Gamboa Pascoe, 93, Mexican trade union leader and politician.
- Robert Goossens, 88, French jeweller.
- Alwin Albert Hafner, 85, Malagasy Roman Catholic prelate, Bishop of Morombe (1989–2000).
- Alan Haven, 80, English jazz organist.
- John Johnson, 68, American basketball player (Cleveland Cavaliers, Houston Rockets, Seattle SuperSonics), NBA Champion (1979).
- Kitty Kallen, 94, American singer ("Little Things Mean a Lot").
- Jewel Kats, 37, American author, complications following surgery.
- Judith Kaye, 77, American lawyer, Chief Judge of the New York Court of Appeals (1993–2008), cancer.
- István Komáromi, 72, Hungarian politician, MP (1994–1998).
- Richard Libertini, 82, American actor (Fletch, All of Me, Popeye), cancer.
- Cristian Moisescu, 68, Romanian politician, Mayor of Arad (1992–1996).
- William H. O'Dell, 77, American politician, member of the South Carolina Senate (since 1989).
- Houshang Ostovar, 88, Iranian composer.
- Jit Samaroo, 65, Trinidadian Steelpan musician and arranger.
- Ashraf Pahlavi, 96, Persian princess, President of the Women's Organization of Iran (1967–1979).
- Mufti Mohammad Sayeed, 79, Indian politician, Chief Minister of Jammu and Kashmir (2002–2005, since 2015), Minister of Home Affairs (1989–1990), multiple organ failure.
- Troy Shondell, 76, American singer, complications from Alzheimer's disease and Parkinson's disease.
- Sergey Shustikov, 45, Russian football player (Torpedo Moscow) and manager (Solyaris Moscow).
- Sergei Simonov, 23, Russian ice hockey player (HC Lipetsk), complications after spleen surgery.
- Anton Srholec, 86, Slovak writer and priest, lung cancer.
- Anna Synodinou, 88, Greek politician and actress (The 300 Spartans).
- János György Szilágyi, 97, Hungarian historian.
- Yeow Chai Thiam, 62, Malaysian politician, cancer.
- Jesús María Ramón Valdés, 77, Mexican politician.
- Sir Christopher Wallace, 73, British army lieutenant general, Commandant Royal College of Defence Studies (2001–2005), amyloidosis.
- Hansrudi Wäscher, 87, German comics artist.
- Valerio Zanone, 79, Italian politician, Secretary of Italian Liberal Party (1976–1985) and Mayor of Turin (1990–1991).

=== 8 ===
- Hamdy Ahmed, 82, Egyptian actor (Al-Kahira 30, Al-Ard, Al Asfour).
- Horst Boog, 88, German historian.
- Otis Clay, 73, American R&B and soul singer ("Tryin' to Live My Life Without You", "The Only Way Is Up"), heart attack.
- Maria Teresa de Filippis, 89, Italian racing driver, first woman to race in Formula One (Maserati, Behra-Porsche).
- Oscar Fritschi, 76, Swiss politician.
- Ida Gaskin, 96, Welsh-born New Zealand teacher and quiz show contestant.
- Alessandro Ghinami, 92, Italian politician, President of Sardinia (1979–1980).
- M. O. Joseph, 86, Indian film producer.
- Medea Jugeli, 90, Georgian gymnast, Olympic champion (1952).
- Gunaram Khanikar, 66, Indian herbalist.
- Stan Levenson, 77, Canadian Olympic sprinter.
- Diana Mitchell, 83, Zimbabwean political activist and writer.
- German Moreno, 82, Philippine television host (That's Entertainment, Walang Tulugan with the Master Showman, GMA Supershow) and actor, cardiac arrest.
- Tsuneo Nakahara, 85, Japanese communications engineer.
- Royal Parker, 86, American television personality, heart failure.
- Paddy Reid, 91, Irish rugby union and league player.
- Red Simpson, 81, American country singer-songwriter ("I'm a Truck"), complications from a heart attack.
- Brett Smiley, 60, American singer-songwriter.
- Piet Steenkamp, 90, Dutch politician, President of the Senate (1983–1991).
- Risto Syrjänen, 90, Finnish Olympic hurdler.
- Carlos Milcíades Villalba Aquino, 91, Paraguayan Roman Catholic prelate, Bishop of San Juan Bautista de las Misiones (1978–1999).

=== 9 ===
- Barbara Allyne Bennet, 76, American actress (Mac and Me, The Office).
- Myra Carter, 86, American actress (Three Tall Women, 8mm), pneumonia.
- Merab Chigoev, 65, South Ossetian politician, Prime Minister (1998–2001), traffic collision.
- Lawrence H. Cohn, 78, American surgeon, stroke.
- Cielito del Mundo, 80, Filipino singer, actress and politician, heart attack.
- Henri Delerue, 76, French Olympic racewalker.
- Hamada Emam, 68, Egyptian footballer (Zamalek SC).
- Peter Gavin Hall, 64, Australian statistician, leukemia.
- John Harvard, 77, Canadian politician, Lieutenant Governor of Manitoba (2004–2009).
- Gareth Hoskins, 48, Scottish architect, complications from a heart attack.
- Johnny Jordan, 94, English footballer (Tonbridge).
- Bob Leonard, 74, Canadian professional wrestling promoter and photographer (Stampede Wrestling).
- Mike McGinnity, 74, English football chairman (Coventry City).
- Robert Naegele, 90, German actor (The NeverEnding Story II, The Old Fox, Waller's Last Trip).
- Ronnie Quillian, 81, American-born Canadian football player (Ottawa Rough Riders).
- Umberto Raho, 93, Italian actor (The Bird with the Crystal Plumage, The Last Man on Earth, Aladdin).
- Lance Rautzhan, 63, American baseball player (Los Angeles Dodgers, Milwaukee Brewers), cancer.
- José María Rivas, 57, Salvadoran footballer (national team), leukemia.
- Gianni Rondolino, 83, Italian film critic and historian, founder of the Turin Film Festival.
- Paul-Marie François Rousset, 94, French Roman Catholic prelate, Bishop of Saint-Étienne (1971–1987).
- Angus Scrimm, 89, American actor (Phantasm, Alias, John Dies at the End), prostate cancer.
- Beau St. Clair, 63, American film producer (The Thomas Crown Affair, The November Man, Laws of Attraction), ovarian cancer.
- St Jovite, 26, American-bred Irish-trained racehorse, winner of the 1992 Irish Derby and King George VI and Queen Elizabeth Stakes.
- Ed Stewart, 74, British TV and radio broadcaster (Top of the Pops, Crackerjack), stroke.
- Vicente Troudart, 64, Panamanian baseball umpire.
- Peggy Willis-Aarnio, 67, American ballet choreographer.
- Zelimkhan Yaqub, 65, Azerbaijani poet.

=== 10 ===
- Abbas Bahri, 61, Tunisian mathematician and professor (Rutgers University).
- Jerry Beach, 74, American blues musician.
- Wim Bleijenberg, 85, Dutch footballer (Ajax, national team).
- David Bowie, 69, English singer-songwriter, musician ("Heroes", "Space Oddity", "Life on Mars?") and actor (The Man Who Fell to Earth), six-time Grammy winner, liver cancer.
- Bård Breivik, 67, Norwegian sculptor, cancer.
- Alton Brown, 90, American baseball player (Washington Senators).
- Ann Z. Caracristi, 94, American cryptographer, Deputy Director of the NSA (1980–1982), complications from dementia.
- Charles Congden Carpenter, 94, American naturalist.
- Teofil Codreanu, 74, Romanian footballer (Rapid București).
- Jeanne Córdova, 67, German-born American LGBT activist, brain cancer.
- Arlyn E. Danker, 88, American politician.
- Carolyn Denning, 88, American pediatrician, stroke.
- Michael Galeota, 31, American actor (The Jersey, Bailey Kipper's P.O.V., Bushwhacked), heart disease and hypertension.
- Hernán Gamboa, 69, Venezuelan musician (Serenata Guayanesa), cancer.
- Ulrich Hahnen, 63, German politician, Deputy of the Landtag of North Rhine-Westphalia (since 2010), cancer.
- Ralph Hauenstein, 103, American philanthropist and businessman.
- Alex Hickman, 90, Canadian judge and politician.
- Francis Thomas Hurley, 88, American Roman Catholic prelate, Archbishop of Anchorage (1976–2001), Bishop of Juneau (1971–1976).
- George Jonas, 80, Hungarian-born Canadian writer (Vengeance), Parkinson's disease.
- Kalevi Lehtovirta, 87, Finnish Olympic footballer (1952).
- Anthony Mellows, 79, British barrister and academic, Lord Prior of the Order of St John (2008–2014).
- Connie Mhone, 47, Malawian netball player and coach.
- Ivone Mufuca, 43, Angolan Olympic handball player, complications during childbirth.
- Bob Oatley, 87, Australian yachtsman (Wild Oats XI) and winemaker (Rosemount).
- Arthur S. Obermayer, 84, American entrepreneur and philanthropist, cancer.
- Dick Spady, 92, American businessman (Dick's Drive-In).
- John Stokes, 70, British Army soldier and mountaineer.
- The Wolfman, 80, Hungarian-born Canadian professional wrestler (WWWF).
- Cornelis Zitman, 89, Dutch-born Venezuelan sculptor.
- Yusuf Zuayyin, 84, Syrian politician, Prime Minister (1965, 1966–1968).

=== 11 ===
- Budi Anduk, 47, Indonesian actor (Opera Van Java) and comedian, pneumonia.
- Reginaldo Araújo, 38, Brazilian footballer, heart attack.
- Elizabeth Aston, 67, English author, pancreatic cancer.
- Sylvan Barnet, 89, American literary critic, cancer.
- Robert Coates, 87, Canadian politician, MP (1957–1988).
- Sir Kenneth Corfield, 91, British camera engineer, inventor of the Corfield Periflex.
- John Easter, 70, English squash player and cricketer, World Championship silver medallist (1973).
- Berge Furre, 78, Norwegian politician and historian.
- Monte Irvin, 96, American Hall of Fame baseball player (Newark Eagles, New York Giants, Chicago Cubs), winner of the 1954 World Series.
- Yevgeny Kotlov, 66, Russian Soviet ice hockey player (Dynamo Moscow).
- Albert Onyembo Lomandjo, 84, Congolese Roman Catholic prelate, Bishop of Kindu (1966–1978).
- E. John Lownes III, 88, American politician.
- Stanley Mann, 87, Canadian screenwriter (The Collector, Conan the Destroyer, Firestarter).
- John B. Mansbridge, 98, American art director (Bedknobs and Broomsticks, Tron, The Apple Dumpling Gang).
- David Margulies, 78, American actor (Ghostbusters, The Sopranos, Conversations with My Father).
- Chuck Pitcock, 57, American football player (Tampa Bay Bandits).
- János Radványi, 93, Hungarian-born American political scientist and diplomat, Ambassador to the United States (1962–1967).
- Don Strauch, 89, American politician, Mayor of Mesa, Arizona (1980–1984), member of the Arizona House of Representatives (1987–1988), complications from a fall.
- Dorotea Turnbull, 86, Argentine Olympic swimmer.
- Gunnel Vallquist, 97, Swedish writer and translator (In Search of Lost Time).

=== 12 ===
- Hilda Antes, 86, German Olympic sprinter.
- Gian Bazzi, 84, Swiss Olympic ice hockey player (1952).
- Robert Black, 68, Scottish serial killer and kidnapper, heart attack.
- James L. Browning Jr., 83, American prosecutor, fall.
- Ivan Bukavshin, 20, Russian chess Grandmaster, stroke.
- Rose Chibambo, 86, Malawian politician, Deputy Minister for Hospitals, Prisons and Social Welfare (1963–1964), heart attack.
- Marian Czapla, 69, Polish painter.
- Gastón Guzmán, 83, Mexican mycologist and anthropologist, heart attack.
- Brian Johnson, 59, Australian rugby league player and coach (St. George, Warrington), Alzheimer's disease.
- Yoshiko Kakudo, 81, Japanese-born American art curator and philanthropist, stroke.
- Lee Jeong-myung, 48, South Korean Olympic tennis player.
- Ruth Leuwerik, 91, German film actress (The Trapp Family).
- Witold Mańczak, 91, Polish linguist.
- Tommy Mulgrew, 86, British footballer (Southampton).
- Meg Mundy, 101, American actress (Fatal Attraction, All My Children, Ordinary People).
- William Needles, 97, American-Canadian actor.
- Erik Olsson, 85, Swedish Olympic wrestler.
- Milorad Rajović, 61, Serbian footballer.
- Dave Sime, 79, American sprinter and ophthalmologist, Olympic silver medalist (1960), cancer.
- Andrew Smith, 25, American basketball player (Butler Bulldogs, Neptūnas), non-Hodgkin lymphoma.
- John Stevens, 86, British journalist.
- Melania Ursu, 75, Romanian stage and film actress (Flames over Treasures).
- Carolyn D. Wright, 67, American poet, thrombosis.

=== 13 ===
- Luis Arroyo, 88, Puerto Rican baseball player (St. Louis Cardinals, Pittsburgh Pirates, New York Yankees), winner of the 1961 World Series, cancer.
- Brian Bedford, 80, British actor (Robin Hood, Nixon, Much Ado About Nothing), cancer.
- William Craig, 97, American philosopher.
- Giorgio Gomelsky, 81, Georgian-born Swiss filmmaker (La Collectionneuse), impresario, band manager (The Rolling Stones, The Yardbirds), songwriter and record producer.
- Christina Gustafsson, 64, Swedish Olympic sport shooter (1984).
- Bern Herbolsheimer, 67, American composer, cancer.
- J. F. R. Jacob, 92, Indian military officer, pneumonia.
- Sir Albert McQuarrie, 98, Scottish politician, MP for East Aberdeenshire (1979–1983) and Banff and Buchan (1983–1987).
- Dick Megugorac, 87, American land speed racer and customizer.
- Conrad Phillips, 90, British television and film actor (The Adventures of William Tell).
- Lawrence Phillips, 40, American football player (University of Nebraska, St. Louis Rams) and convicted felon, suicide by hanging.
- Vladimir Pribylovsky, 59, Russian human rights activist and journalist.
- Addepalli Ramamohana Rao, 80, Indian Telugu poet.
- Mike Salmon, 82, British racing driver.
- Jim Simpson, 88, American sportscaster (NBC Sports).
- Zaharije Trnavčević, 90, Serbian politician, Acting President of the National Assembly (2012).
- G. A. Vadivelu, 90, Indian independence activist and politician.
- Lois Weisberg, 90, American civil servant and socialite.
- Tera Wray, 33, American pornographic actress, suicide.

=== 14 ===
- René Angélil, 73, Canadian entertainment manager (Celine Dion), throat cancer.
- George Carroll, 94, American lawyer and politician, mayor of Richmond, California (1964–1965).
- Franco Citti, 80, Italian actor (The Godfather, Accattone, The Decameron).
- Calvin Greenaway, 67, Antigua and Barbuda Olympic athlete.
- Laurence Guest, 80, British Olympic rower.
- Jim Hannah, 71, American attorney, Chief Justice of the Arkansas Supreme Court (2005–2015).
- Al Hart, 88, American radio host (KCBS, KNBR, WOBT).
- Glyn W. Humphreys, 61, British neuropsychologist.
- Anna Lærkesen, 73, Danish ballerina.
- Anissa Rawda Najjar, 92, Lebanese feminist and women's rights activist.
- Franco Oppo, 80, Italian composer.
- P. M. K. Raghunath, 65, Indian cricketer.
- Alan Rickman, 69, English actor (Harry Potter, Die Hard, Love Actually), BAFTA winner (1992), pancreatic cancer.
- Shaolin, 44, Brazilian humorist, heart attack.
- Jane Stuart Smith, 90, American operatic soprano, hymnologist, and author
- Robert Banks Stewart, 84, Scottish television writer (Doctor Who, Bergerac, Shoestring), cancer.
- Larry Stuffle, 67, American politician and lobbyist.
- Shigeaki Uchino, 84, Japanese Olympic pentathlete.
- Sergio Vacchi, 90, Italian painter.
- Rajesh Vivek, 66, Indian actor (Lagaan), heart attack.
- Ellen Meiksins Wood, 73, American historian, cancer.
- Leonid Zhabotinsky, 77, Ukrainian Soviet weightlifter, Olympic champion (1964, 1968).

=== 15 ===
- Frank Aasand, 66, American curler.
- Francisco X. Alarcón, 61, American poet, cancer.
- Peter Atteslander, 89, Swiss sociologist.
- James Birren, 97, American gerontologist.
- Daniel Bohan, 74, Canadian Roman Catholic prelate, Archbishop of Regina (since 2005), cancer.
- Robert Darène, 102, French actor (The Cage).
- Robin Fletcher, 93, British academic administrator and field hockey player, Olympic bronze medallist (1952).
- Anil Ganguly, 82, Indian film director (Kora Kagaz, Tapasya).
- Marie L. Garibaldi, 81, American judge, first woman to serve on the New Jersey Supreme Court.
- Dan Haggerty, 74, American actor (The Life and Times of Grizzly Adams), spinal cancer.
- Tunku Alif Hussein, 31, Malaysian royal.
- Pete Huttlinger, 54, American guitarist (John Denver, LeAnn Rimes), stroke.
- Avrom Isaacs, 89, Canadian art dealer.
- Ken Judge, 58, Australian football player (East Fremantle, Hawthorn, Brisbane Bears) and coach (Hawthorn, West Coast Eagles), cancer.
- Andrzej Kotkowski, 75, Polish film director (Olympics 40).
- Hiroshige Koyama, 78, Japanese botanist.
- Peter Kraus, 83, German Olympic athlete.
- Marvin Lipofsky, 77, American glass artist, complications of diabetes.
- P. J. Mara, 73, Irish public affairs consultant, Senator (1977–1981, 1982–1983).
- Rex Morgan, 67, American basketball player (Boston Celtics), throat cancer.
- John J. Pruis, 92, American educator, President of Ball State University (1968–1978).
- Alexandre Reza, 93, Russian-born French jeweler.
- Oleksandr Shevchenko, 78, Ukrainian scientist, jurist and politician, member of the Verkhovna Rada (2012–2014).
- Grzegorz Strouhal, 73, Polish Olympic sport shooter.
- Manuel Velázquez, 72, Spanish footballer (Real Madrid, Rayo Vallecano, Málaga), winner of the 1965–66 European Cup.
- Aristide von Bienefeldt, 56, Dutch writer, cancer.
- Robert D. Wetmore, 85, American politician.
- Buzzy Wilkinson, 83, American basketball player (Virginia Cavaliers).

=== 16 ===
- Joannis Avramidis, 93, Georgian-born Austrian sculptor.
- Joan Balzar, 87, Canadian artist.
- Charles L. Bestor, 91, American composer and academic.
- Theodor Danetti, 89, Romanian stage and film actor.
- Ananda Chandra Dutta, 92, Indian botanist.
- Jerry Dwyer, 85, American businessman and pilot, complications from Alzheimer's disease.
- Thor Furulund, 72, Norwegian painter.
- Hubert Giraud, 94, French songwriter.
- Bob Harkey, 85, American racecar driver (USAC).
- Joe Hergert, 79, American football player (Buffalo Bills).
- Kevin Junior, 46, American musician.
- Georgie Lamon, 81, Swiss politician, shot.
- Gary Loizzo, 70, American singer (The American Breed), pancreatic cancer.
- Ted Marchibroda, 84, American football player (Pittsburgh Steelers, Chicago Cardinals) and coach (Baltimore Colts, Baltimore Ravens).
- Rudy Migay, 87, Canadian ice hockey player (Toronto Maple Leafs).
- John Mills, 85, Canadian writer.
- Carmelau Monestime, 86, Haitian-born American activist and radio broadcaster, pioneer of Haitian Creole radio in South Florida.
- Hans-Joachim Reich, 85, German Olympic swimmer.
- Jean-Noël Rey, 66, Swiss businessman, CEO of Swiss Post, shot.
- Lloyd Rudolph, 88, American political scientist.
- Mervyn Sandri, 83, New Zealand cricketer.
- Eva Saulitis, 52, American marine biologist and poet, breast cancer.
- Ed Voytek, 80, American football player (Washington Redskins).
- Leonidas B. Young II, 62, American politician, Mayor of Richmond, Virginia (1994–1996).

=== 17 ===
- Reza Ahadi, 53, Iranian football player and coach.
- Peggy Anderson, 77, American author and journalist (The Philadelphia Inquirer).
- Blowfly, 76, American musician and producer, liver cancer.
- Mondli Cele, 26, South African footballer, traffic collision.
- Olamide David, 14, Nigerian actor, abdominal injury.
- Melvin Day, 92, New Zealand artist.
- Jo de Winter, 94, American actress (Gloria, Dirty Harry, Bird).
- Geethapriya, 83, Indian director (Mannina Maga).
- Mic Gillette, 64, American brass player (Tower of Power), heart attack.
- Dale Griffin, 67, British drummer (Mott the Hoople), Alzheimer's disease.
- Gulch, 31, American thoroughbred racehorse, euthanised due to complications from cancer.
- Gottfried Honegger, 98, Swiss artist and graphic designer.
- Carina Jaarnek, 53, Swedish singer and Dansband artist, cerebral haemorrhage.
- Stephen Levine, 78, American poet.
- Jules Le Lievre, 82, New Zealand rugby union player (Canterbury, national team).
- Sherron Mills, 44, American basketball player (BCM Gravelines), amyotrophic lateral sclerosis.
- Ion Panțuru, 81, Romanian bobsledder, Olympic bronze medalist (1968).
- Delphine Parrott, 87, British immunologist.
- Billy Quinn, 80, Irish hurler.
- V. Rama Rao, 80, Indian politician, Governor of Sikkim (2002–2007).
- Josef Rösch, 90, Czech-born American radiologist.
- Angus Ross, 59, Scottish darts player, pancreatic cancer.
- Ramblin' Lou Schriver, 86, American country musician and radio broadcaster (WXRL), heart disease.
- Francis B. Schulte, 89, American Roman Catholic prelate, Archbishop of New Orleans (1988–2001).
- Mike Sharpe, 64, Canadian professional wrestler (WWF).
- John Taihuttu, 61, Dutch footballer (VVV, Fortuna Sittard).
- Sudhindra Thirtha, 89, Indian Hindu religious leader.
- Jenő Váncsa, 87, Hungarian politician, Minister of Agriculture and Food (1980–1989).

=== 18 ===
- Leila Alaoui, 33, French-born Moroccan artist and photographer, heart attack.
- António de Almeida Santos, 89, Portuguese lawyer and politician, President of Assembly of the Republic (1995–2002).
- Johnny Bach, 91, American basketball player (Boston Celtics) and coach (Fordham University, Penn State, Chicago Bulls).
- Terry Cook, 88, Welsh rugby union and rugby league footballer.
- Manpreet Akhtar, 51, Indian Punjabi and folk singer.
- Pierre DesRuisseaux, 70, Canadian poet.
- Glenn Frey, 67, American songwriter, musician (Eagles) and actor (Jerry Maguire), complications following intestinal surgery.
- Karsten Isachsen, 71, Norwegian priest, author and public speaker.
- Andy Dog Johnson, 57, British artist, designer of many The The record sleeves, brain tumour.
- Lars Roar Langslet, 79, Norwegian politician, Minister of Culture and Science (1982–1986).
- Oleksiy Logvynenko, 69, Ukrainian translator (The Catcher in the Rye).
- Loredana, 91, Italian actress (Immigrants, The King's Jester, La Fornarina).
- Mike MacDowel, 83, British racing driver (Cooper), cancer.
- Pablo Manavello, 65, Italian-born Venezuelan musician.
- Gary Menteer, 76, American television producer and director (Family Matters, Punky Brewster, Laverne & Shirley).
- William Morgan, 85, American architect.
- Else Marie Pade, 91, Danish composer.
- Asha Patil, 79, Indian actress.
- Thrisadee Sahawong, 35, Thai actor.
- T. S. Sinnathuray, 85, Singaporean Supreme Court judge, pneumonia.
- Antonella Steni, 89, Italian actress (The Tiger and the Pussycat, Kaputt Mundi, Nel sole).
- Joe Sweeney, 82, Australian Olympic wrestler.
- Michel Tournier, 91, French writer (Friday, or, The Other Island, The Erl-King).
- Nicolaus Zwetnow, 86, Norwegian sport shooter.

=== 19 ===
- William G. Bowdler, 91, American diplomat, Ambassador to South Africa (1975–1978).
- Laurie Bower, 82, Canadian jazz musician
- Robert M. Carter, 73, British-born Australian marine geologist and climate change denier, complications from a heart attack.
- Antonia Churchill, 96, American Olympic sailor (1936).
- John Corcoran, 56, Irish sports administrator.
- David Craighead, 84, Romanian-born American politician.
- Jean-Philippe Douin, 75, French military officer, Chief of the Defence Staff (1995–1998).
- Joachim Fernandez, 43, Senegalese footballer.
- M. K. A. D. S. Gunawardana, 68, Sri Lankan politician, Minister of Lands (since 2015).
- Óskar Jónsson, 90, Icelandic Olympic runner.
- Claude Lefebvre, 86, Canadian politician, Mayor of Laval, Quebec (1981–1989).
- Laurence Lerner, 90, South African-born British literary critic.
- Richard Levins, 85, American mathematical ecologist and population geneticist.
- Forrest McDonald, 89, American historian and constitutional scholar.
- Sylvia McLaughlin, 99, American environmentalist, co-founder of Save the Bay.
- Micole Mercurio, 77, American actress (Flashdance, What Lies Beneath, The Client).
- Lou Michaels, 80, American football player (Los Angeles Rams, Pittsburgh Steelers, Baltimore Colts), pancreatic cancer.
- Max Nijman, 74, Surinamese singer.
- Samuel Odulana Odugade I, 101, Nigerian royal, Olubadan of Ibadan (since 2007).
- Ettore Scola, 84, Italian film director and screenwriter (We All Loved Each Other So Much, A Special Day, Le Bal), heart attack.
- Rich Severson, 71, American baseball player (Kansas City Royals).
- Sheila Sim, Lady Attenborough, 93, English actress (A Canterbury Tale, Pandora and the Flying Dutchman, West of Zanzibar), dementia.
- William Y. Smith, 90, American air force general, heart failure.
- Frank Sullivan, 85, American baseball player (Boston Red Sox, Philadelphia Phillies, Minnesota Twins), pneumonia.
- Eugen Vollmar, 87, Swiss Olympic rower.

=== 20 ===
- Herbert L. Abrams, 95, American physician.
- Lee Abramson, 45, American composer and musician.
- Arch, 21, American Thoroughbred racehorse, winner of the Super Derby (1998) and Fayette Stakes (1998), heart attack.
- Bud Beardmore, 76, American lacrosse coach (Maryland), Parkinson's disease.
- Constance Beresford-Howe, 93, Canadian novelist.
- Subrata Bose, 83, Indian politician, cardiac arrest.
- Mykolas Burokevičius, 88, Lithuanian politician, member of the Politburo of the CPSU Central Committee.
- Chang Yung-fa, 88, Taiwanese businessman (Evergreen Group).
- Edmonde Charles-Roux, 95, French writer.
- Stuart Cowden, 90, English footballer (Stoke City).
- Joan Douglass, 91, American politician.
- Bairbre Dowling, 62, Irish actress (Zardoz, The Dead, War of the Buttons).
- Ronnie Greenwald, 82, American rabbi.
- Jack Hailman, 79, American zoologist.
- David G. Hartwell, 74, American editor, publisher and critic, injuries from a fall.
- Hung-ta Chang, 102, Chinese botanist.
- Brian Key, 68, British politician, MEP for Yorkshire South (1979–1984).
- Kingmambo, 25, American-bred French thoroughbred racehorse, euthanized. (death announced on this date)
- Valerie Pearl, 89, British historian.
- Eva Schorr, 88, German painter and composer.
- George Weidenfeld, Baron Weidenfeld, 96, Austrian-born British publisher, philanthropist, and newspaper columnist.
- Edward Yourdon, 72, American computer scientist.

=== 21 ===
- Ron Collins, 59, Canadian curler.
- Mauro Gianneschi, 84, Italian cyclist.
- Andrew J. Hinshaw, 92, American politician, member of the United States House of Representatives from California's 39th and 40th congressional districts (1973–1977).
- Glenn Jenks, 68, American ragtime pianist and composer.
- Bill Johnson, 55, American alpine skier, Olympic champion (1984).
- Bogusław Kaczyński, 73, Polish classical music journalist, stroke.
- Gérard Kamanda wa Kamanda, 75, Congolese politician.
- Richard Klinkhamer, 78, Dutch writer.
- Derrick Todd Lee, 47, American convicted serial killer, heart disease.
- Cabot Lyford, 90, American sculptor, pulmonary distress.
- Harrison McIntosh, 101, American ceramicist.
- Jerker Porath, 94, Swedish biochemist.
- Stephanie Rader, 100, American spy.
- Garnet Richardson, 82, Canadian curler, world champion (1959, 1960, 1962, 1963).
- Mrinalini Sarabhai, 97, Indian classical dancer, choreographer and instructor.
- Robert Sassone, 37, French road racing cyclist, suicide.
- Val Sears, 88, Canadian journalist (Toronto Star).
- Francis Seow, 87, Singapore-born American writer and political refugee, pneumonia.
- Michael Sheringham, 67, English literary academic.
- Ron Southern, 85, Canadian businessman (ATCO).
- Robert Tuggle, 82, American writer and archivist.
- Gerald Williams, 86, Welsh tennis commentator.

=== 22 ===
- Tom Aidala, 82, American architect.
- Khandaker Nurul Alam, Bangladeshi singer and composer.
- Victor Arbez, 81, French Olympic skier.
- Homayoun Behzadi, 73, Iranian football player (Shahin, Paykan, national team) and coach (Persepolis), Asian Champion (1968, 1972).
- Eugene Borowitz, 91, American rabbi and philosopher.
- Fred Bruney, 84, American football player (Boston Patriots).
- Tommy Bryceland, 76, Scottish footballer (St Mirren, Norwich, Oldham).
- Pete Carmichael, 74, American football coach (Jacksonville Jaguars).
- Ryuichi Doi, 76, Japanese politician.
- John Dowie, 60, Scottish footballer (Fulham, Celtic).
- John Farris, 75, American author.
- Kamer Genç, 75, Turkish politician, member of the Grand National Assembly (1987–2015), cancer.
- Shankar Ghosh, 80, Indian tabla player, pneumonia.
- Bill Groom, 81, Canadian curler.
- Holly Hogrobrooks, 75, American civil rights activist and journalist.
- Waymond C. Huggins, 88, American politician.
- Juan Manuel Ley, 82, Mexican businessman (Casa Ley).
- Jorge Lucardi, 87, Argentine Olympic equestrian.
- Constantin Mihail, 70, Romanian track and field coach.
- Ian Murray, 83, Scottish Roman Catholic prelate, Bishop of Argyll and the Isles (1999–2008).
- Abolhassan Najafi, 86, Iranian writer and translator.
- Denise Newman, 91, British Olympic diver (1948).
- Mikhail Odnoralov, 71, Russian-born American painter.
- Cecil Parkinson, Baron Parkinson, 84, British politician, cabinet minister, cancer.
- Robert Pickus, 92, American activist.
- Lois Ramsey, 93, Australian actress (The Box, Prisoner).
- Miloslav Ransdorf, 62, Czech politician, MEP (since 2004).
- Raymond Rock, 93, Canadian politician.
- Sarah, 15, American zoo cheetah.
- Anthony Simmons, 93, British screenwriter and film director (The Optimists of Nine Elms, Black Joy).
- Storm Flag Flying, 16, American thoroughbred racehorse, foaling complications.
- Rik Wilson, 53, American ice hockey player (St. Louis Blues).
- Tahsin Yücel, 83, Turkish writer.

=== 23 ===
- Nikolay Abramov, 54, Russian Vepsian writer and translator.
- Bob Arnott, 93, Australian Olympic alpine skier (1952).
- Dorothy Atkinson, 86, American historian.
- Lela Autio, 88, American painter.
- Jimmy Bain, 68, Scottish bassist (Rainbow, Dio), lung cancer.
- Jack Bannister, 85, English cricket player (Warwickshire) and commentator.
- Barry Brickell, 80, New Zealand ceramic artist.
- Cadalack Ron, 34, American rapper, mixed drug intoxication.
- Pablo Contessi, Paraguayan doctor and politician, Governor of Presidente Hayes Department (since 2013), traffic collision.
- Antony Emerson, 52, Australian tennis player, cancer.
- Espectrito, 49, Mexican professional wrestler (WWF, AAA).
- Josip Friščić, 66, Croatian politician, Vice President of Parliament (2008–2011).
- Sofía Gandarias, 58, Spanish painter.
- Archie Gouldie, 79, Canadian professional wrestler, complications from hip surgery.
- Jennifer Guinness, 78, Irish socialite and kidnapping victim, cancer.
- Grahame Hodgson, 79, Welsh rugby union player (national team).
- Žuži Jelinek, 96, Croatian fashion stylist, designer and writer.
- A. C. Jose, 78, Indian politician, Speaker of Kerala Legislature (1982), member of Parliament (1996–1997, 1998–2004).
- Marie Mahoney, 91, American baseball player (AAGBPL).
- R. Clayton McWhorter, 82, American businessman and philanthropist.
- Matt Pearce, 48, Canadian football player (Winnipeg Blue Bombers).
- Elisabeta Polihroniade, 80, Romanian chess Woman Grandmaster (1982) and International Arbiter.
- Bernard Quennehen, 85, French racing cyclist.
- Bill Roberts, 90, American basketball player (Chicago Stags, Boston Celtics, St. Louis Bombers).
- Francisco Rubio Llorente, 85, Spanish jurist, President of the Spanish Council of State (2004–2012).
- George Sefcik, 76, American football coach (Cincinnati Bengals, New York Giants, Atlanta Falcons).
- Koichi Sekimoto, 37, Japanese footballer (Sagan Tosu).
- Dmitry Shirkov, 88, Russian theoretical physicist.
- Bobby Wanzer, 94, American Hall of Fame basketball player and coach (Rochester/Cincinnati Royals), NBA Champion (1951).
- Walt Williams, 72, American baseball player (Chicago White Sox, Cleveland Indians, New York Yankees), heart attack.

=== 24 ===
- Gian Carlo Abelli, 74, Italian politician, member of the Chamber of Deputies.
- Fredrik Barth, 87, Norwegian social anthropologist.
- Neville Black, 90, New Zealand rugby union (Auckland, national team) and rugby league (Wigan, Keighley) player.
- Yvonne Chouteau, 86, American ballerina.
- David Finkelstein, 86, American physicist.
- Forouzan, 78, Iranian actress.
- Malcolm Grear, 84, American graphic designer.
- John Jay Hooker, 85, American politician.
- Christine Jackson, 53, British-born Australian cellist, complications from a brain aneurysm.
- Constantijn Kortmann, 71, Dutch legal scholar.
- Clyde Mashore, 70, American baseball player (Montreal Expos).
- Donald Milne, 81, American politician, member of the Vermont House of Representatives (1967), cancer.
- Marvin Minsky, 88, American cognitive scientist and pioneer in artificial intelligence, cerebral hemorrhage.
- Wim Mook, 83, Dutch physicist.
- Alejandro Muñoz-Alonso, 82, Spanish politician, member of the Congress of Deputies (1989–2000) and Senate (2000–2015).
- Zarkus Poussa, 40, Finnish drummer (RinneRadio) and songwriter.
- Teófilo Rodríguez, 44, Venezuelan criminal, shot.
- Barry J. Shillito, 95, American businessman and government official.
- Lois Snowe-Mello, 67, American politician, member of Maine House of Representatives (1996–2004) and Senate (2004–2012).
- Gillian Tanner, 96, British firefighter.
- Schalk van der Merwe, 54, South African tennis player.
- Eric Webster, 84, English football player (Manchester City) and manager (Stockport County).
- Henry Worsley, 55, British adventurer, multiple organ failure.

=== 25 ===
- Jashubhai Dhanabhai Barad, 60, Indian politician, member of Parliament (2004–2009), brain tumour.
- David Chatters, 69, Canadian politician, pancreatic cancer.
- Blaine Denning, 85, American basketball player (Elmira Colonels, Harlem Globetrotters, Baltimore Bullets).
- Thornton Dial, 87, American artist.
- Denise Duval, 94, French soprano.
- Kalpana, 50, Indian actress (Thanichalla Njan), heart attack.
- Howard Koslow, 91, American illustrator.
- Robert Lorick, American lyricist and voice actor. (death announced on this date)
- John Murrell, 83, British theoretical chemist.
- Padmarani, 79, Indian actress.
- Concepcion Picciotto, 80, Spanish-born American peace activist.
- Leif Solberg, 101, Norwegian composer and organist.
- Ron Stillwell, 76, American baseball player (Washington Senators), cancer.
- Paul Terasaki, 86, American scientist and philanthropist.

=== 26 ===
- Alvin Achenbaum, 90, American advertising executive.
- Sunday Adewusi, 79, Nigerian policeman, Inspector-general of police (1981–1983).
- Zaw Zaw Aung, 79, Burmese author and public intellectual.
- Black, 53, British singer-songwriter ("Wonderful Life"), head injuries sustained in a traffic collision.
- Bernard Cookson, 79, British cartoonist.
- Vasilya Fattakhova, 36, Russian Tatar singer, complications of childbirth.
- LaVoy Finicum, 54, American cattle rancher and militant (Malheur National Wildlife Refuge Occupation), shot.
- Barney Hall, 83, American sports commentator (Motor Racing Network), complications from surgery.
- Christer Jönsson, 72, Swedish Olympic gymnast.
- Gil Kahele, 73, American politician, member of the Hawaii Senate (since 2011).
- Ted Karras Sr., 81, American football player (Chicago Bears), NFL champion (1963).
- Tommy Kelly, 90, American actor (The Adventures of Tom Sawyer, Peck's Bad Boy with the Circus), heart failure.
- Sahabzada Yaqub Khan, 95, Pakistani politician and diplomat, Minister of Foreign Affairs (1982–1991, 1996–1997), Ambassador to the United States (1973–1979).
- Olga Kozičová, 64, Slovak Olympic swimmer.
- Martin Lavut, 81, Canadian film maker (Remembering Arthur).
- Margaret Pardee, 95, American violinist and teacher.
- Ray Pointer, 79, English footballer (Burnley, Coventry, Portsmouth).
- Bryce Rohde, 92, Australian jazz pianist, composer.
- T. J. Tindall, 65, American guitarist (MFSB).
- Jerzy Tomaszewski, 92, Polish photographer.
- Takeo Uesugi, 75, Japanese landscape architect.
- László Versényi, 84, Hungarian theatre and voice actor.
- Abe Vigoda, 94, American actor (The Godfather, Barney Miller, Joe Versus the Volcano).
- Barrington Watson, 85, Jamaican painter.
- Oscar Wiggli, 88, Swiss composer and sculptor.
- Larry Woods, 76, Canadian Olympic sailor.

=== 27 ===
- Peter Baker, 84, English footballer (Tottenham Hotspur).
- Barbara Berger, 85, American baseball player (AAGPBL).
- John Brudenall, 77, Australian librarian.
- Antonio Castellanos Mata, 68, Spanish physicist.
- Mary Lou Crocker, 71, American professional golfer.
- Alice Denham, 89, American writer and model, complications from ovarian cancer.
- Georgy Firtich, 77, Russian composer and pianist.
- Artur Fischer, 96, German inventor.
- James Garrett Freeman, 35, American criminal, execution by lethal injection.
- Augusto Giomo, 75, Italian Olympic basketball player (1960, 1964).
- John Howe, 85, South African-born British air vice marshal.
- Carlos Loyzaga, 85, Filipino Olympic basketball player (1952, 1956), bronze medalist at the 1954 FIBA World Championship.
- William E. Martin, 70, American musician, songwriter, screenwriter and voice actor.
- Tommy O'Hara, 63, international professional footballer.
- Jack Reed, 91, American businessman and politician.
- Shirley Tonkin, 94, New Zealand paediatrician and sudden infant death syndrome researcher.
- DeWitt Williams, 96, American politician.
- Ihor Zaytsev, 81, Russian-born Ukrainian Soviet footballer (national team).

=== 28 ===
- Signe Toly Anderson, 74, American singer (Jefferson Airplane).
- Maheswar Baug, 85, Indian politician and independence activist.
- Yisroel Belsky, 77, American rabbi.
- Gene Bissell, 89, American football player and coach (Kansas Wesleyan Coyotes).
- Buddy Cianci, 74, American politician and radio host, Mayor of Providence, Rhode Island (1975–1984, 1991–2002).
- Robert Courtney, 56, New Zealand Paralympic champion sprinter (1984).
- Aleš Debeljak, 54, Slovenian writer, struck by vehicle.
- James deSouza, 90, Pakistani Roman Catholic priest.
- Emile Destombes, 80, French-born Cambodian Roman Catholic prelate, Vicar Apostolic of Phnom Penh (2001–2010).
- Trude Dothan, 93, Israeli archaeologist.
- Paul Kantner, 74, American musician (Jefferson Airplane, Jefferson Starship) and songwriter ("Wooden Ships"), multiple organ failure.
- Mike Minor, 75, American actor (Petticoat Junction, All My Children, The Beverly Hillbillies).
- Jim Morris, 80, American bodybuilder.
- Tommy O'Hara, 62, Scottish footballer (Queen of the South, Washington Diplomats, Motherwell).
- Nigel Peel, 48, English cricketer (Cheshire), brain tumour.
- Peter Robinson, 57, New Zealand musician (The Tin Syndrome).
- Axel Schandorff, 90, Danish track cyclist, Olympic bronze medalist (1948).
- Nadine Senior, 76, English dance teacher.
- Marion Sewer, 43, American pharmacologist.
- Dave Thomson, 77, Scottish footballer (Dunfermline Athletic, Queen of the South).
- Bob Tizard, 91, New Zealand politician, Deputy Prime Minister (1974–1975).
- Ladislav Totkovič, 53, Slovak football player (Inter Bratislava) and manager.
- Richard P. Von Herzen, 85, American earth scientist.
- Basil Wellicome, 89, British Olympic bobsledder.

=== 29 ===
- Karen Johnson Boyd, 91, American heiress and philanthropist.
- Jean-Marie Doré, 77, Guinean politician, Prime Minister (2010).
- Billy Faier, 85, American banjo player.
- Virginia Herrick, 99, American actress (Roar of the Iron Horse, I Killed Geronimo, Vigilante Hideout).
- Sam Hulbert, 79, American academic.
- Nayani Krishnakumari, 85, Indian writer and folklorist.
- Albert Low, 87, British author.
- Linus Maurer, 90, American cartoonist, inspiration for the name Linus Van Pelt.
- Aurèle Nicolet, 90, Swiss flautist.
- Cayetano Paderanga Jr., 67, Filipino economist, Director-General of NEDA (2010–2012), complications after heart surgery.
- Ruth Rehmann, 93, German writer.
- Jacques Rivette, 87, French film director (La Belle Noiseuse, Celine and Julie Go Boating, Out 1) and critic (Cahiers du cinéma), complications from Alzheimer's disease.
- Philip J. Rock, 78, American politician, President of the Illinois Senate (1979–1993).
- John Roper, Baron Roper, 80, British politician.
- Benjamin F. Shobe, 95, American civil rights attorney and judge.
- Donald I. Williamson, 94, British biologist.

=== 30 ===
- Roberto Albanese, 65, Italian politician.
- Girolamo Arnaldi, 86, Italian historian.
- Tony Blaz, 57, Guamanian politician and civil servant, member of the Legislature of Guam, pneumonia.
- J. Robert Carrier, 90, American politician.
- Tias Eckhoff, 89, Norwegian industrial designer.
- Asuquo Ekpe, Nigerian international footballer.
- Feyrouz, 72, Egyptian actress.
- Frank Finlay, 89, English actor (Othello, The Pianist, Bouquet of Barbed Wire), heart failure.
- Francisco Flores Pérez, 56, Salvadoran politician, President (1999–2004), cerebral hemorrhage.
- Betty Francis, 84, American baseball player (AAGBPL).
- T. N. Gopakumar, 58, Indian journalist, cancer.
- K. V. Krishna Rao, 92, Indian general.
- Don Marks, 62, Canadian writer and indigenous rights advocate, liver disease.
- Noelle Middleton, 89, Irish actress.
- Maikhail Miller, 23, American football player (Murray State, Ole Miss), traffic collision.
- Kollam G. K. Pillai, 91, Indian actor.
- Georgia Davis Powers, 92, American civil rights activist and politician, first female and African-American member of the Kentucky State Senate (1968–1989).
- Peter Quinn, 90, Irish Gaelic footballer (Mayo).
- Bill Reinhard, 93, American football player (Los Angeles Dons).
- Ken Sailors, 95, American basketball player (University of Wyoming, Providence Steamrollers), complications from heart attack.
- Mohammad Salimi, 78, Iranian general, Commander-in-Chief of the Army (2000–2005).
- Clarence Lorenzo Simpson Jr., 83, Liberian jurist and politician.
- Max Stackhouse, 80, American theologian.
- Dov Yermiya, 101, Israeli army officer and author.

=== 31 ===
- Jalal Aliyev, 87, Azerbaijani politician.
- Gillian Avery, 89, British children's novelist and historian.
- Mere Broughton, 79, New Zealand Māori language activist and unionist.
- Jon Bunch, 45, American singer (Sense Field, Further Seems Forever), suicidal overdose.
- Bob Bushnell, 100, American bass player and guitarist.
- Miron Chichișan, 70, Romanian politician, Mayor of Zalău (1992–1996).
- Lance Cox, 82, Australian football player (Richmond).
- Elizabeth Eisenstein, 92, American historian.
- Tom Hancock, 67, American politician.
- David Lake, 86, Indian-born Australian science fiction writer.
- Artie L. Metcalf, 86, American biologist.
- Bob Pelkington, 74, American basketball player (Xavier University).
- Pat Piper, 81, American politician.
- Betty Rosenquest Pratt, 90, American tennis player.
- Wolfgang Rademann, 81, German television producer and journalist.
- Donald Van Norman Roberts, 87, American civil engineer.
- Randhir Singh, 94, Indian political scientist.
- Benoît Violier, 44, French-Swiss chef, suicide by gunshot.
- Sir Terry Wogan, 77, Irish-British broadcaster (BBC), cancer.
- Hubert Yockey, 99, American physicist and information theorist.
- Yuan Geng, 98, Chinese politician and business executive.
