= Lownes =

Lownes is a surname. Notable people with the surname include:

- Anna Lownes (1842–1910), American painter
- E. John Lownes III (1927–2016), American politician
- Elizabeth Lownes (1835–1899), birth name of Elizabeth Lownes Rust, American philanthropist, humanitarian, and Christian missionary
- Jolliffe Lownes (died 1627), English apothecarist
- Millicent Lownes-Jackson (fl. from 1990), American professor and author
- Victor Lownes (1928–2017), American businessman and Playboy Enterprises executive

== See also ==
- Lowness (disambiguation)
