= David Craighead =

David Craighead may refer to:

- David Craighead (organist)
- David Craighead (politician)
