= Kotlov =

Kotlov (Russian: Котлов) is a Russian masculine surname, its feminine counterpart is Kotlova. Notable people with the surname include:

- Nikita Kotlov (born 1991), American soccer player
- Yevgeny Kotlov (1949–2016), Soviet hockey player
