= Mark Austin (composer) =

New Zealand musician

Mark Austin (born 1958) is a New Zealand composer and musical director who has written scores for many films, television programmes and commercials. Much of his work has received critical acclaim and he continues to write soundtracks in between commissions and other projects.

== Career ==
With David Long, Austin has collaborated with dance choreographers Douglas Wright, Ann Dewey, Daniel Belton, and Mary Jane O’Reilly, and, on his own, with Josie Thompson.

Besides writing alone, he has collaborated with David Long, Don McGlashan and Neill Duncan, among others. He has also worked in dance and theatre and was particularly active in this area in Auckland in the 1990s, where he was involved in several productions at the now defunct Watershed Theatre. A notable example is Braindead the Musical, on which he collaborated with Neill Duncan as co-composer and Musical Director in 1995, the libretto having been written by Fran Walsh and Stephen Sinclair, with props created by Weta Workshop and the production directed by Michael Hurst.)

In 2002, he moved to his home town of Wellington (where he was well known in the early 1980s as leader of The Tin Syndrome (band)).
