= Lowness =

Lowness may refer to:

- Sharon Lowness, Canadian musician; see Boot Records
- The noun form of Low (complexity), a relationship between complexity classes in computational complexity theory
- Prince Lowness, a character in the Terrific Whatzit DC Comics stories
- A song by Patrice Rushen from the 1990 album The Meeting

== See also ==
- Low (disambiguation)
- Lownes (disambiguation)
- Meanness
- Pitch (music)
