= Millicent Lownes-Jackson =

American professor and author

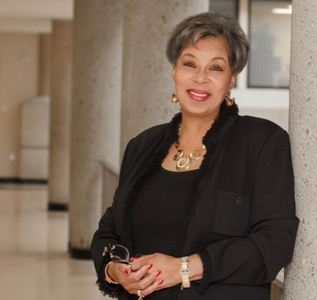
Image of Millicent Lownes-Jackson

Millicent Gray Lownes-Jackson is an American professor and author. She became the dean of the college of business at Tennessee State University on July 1, 2013. She is the founder of the non-profit organizations Interdenominational Services Organization of America, Inc. (ISOA) and The World Institute for Sustainable Education and Research (The WISER Group).

Lownes-Jackson has dedicated her life to providing leadership in academia and the community and resultantly is a recipient of numerous awards and honors for service.

== Early life and education ==
Lownes-Jackson is a native of Philadelphia, Pennsylvania. She was an only child; her father was a funeral director and her mother taught business school and was also a realtor. Lownes-Jackson completed high school and received a Bachelor of Arts degree from Fisk University. While living in Nashville, Tennessee, she continued her education at Vanderbilt University, where she became the first African American woman to receive a Master of Business Administration degree (MBA) from this institution.

== Academic career ==
Lownes-Jackson began a career in banking after receiving the MBA degree. She later applied and was hired as an instructor in the division of business at Tennessee State University. While teaching, she began working on her doctorate and received the Ph.D. degree from Vanderbilt University. She continued her career in academia, becoming a tenured full-professor. For 37 years she has worked in higher education administration, research, teaching, and entrepreneurial endeavors. Internationally recognized as a small business expert, she has authored more than 15 books, numerous refereed journal articles, proceedings, and book chapters, and has made more than 200 academic and professional presentations. Her most recent research in the areas of technology and entrepreneurship provided Lownes-Jackson the opportunity to present internationally in China and Italy.

Lownes-Jackson was interim provost, executive vice president, associate dean and later dean of the AACSB International-accredited College of Business at Tennessee State University. She was the first woman and first African American to hold this position. She also served as the director of the Tennessee Small Business Development Center, the director of the Tennessee State University Small Business Institute Program and director of the TSU Kauffman Entrepreneurial Internship Program.

Dr. Lownes-Jackson has served on the Board of Directors of AACSB International, the major accrediting body for business schools around the world, and was the recent recipient of the National HBCU Business Deans Roundtable Milton Wilson Award for Distinguished Service.

== Community involvement ==
Lownes-Jackson founded the Interdenominational Services Organization of America, Inc. (ISOA) in 1990, a non-profit economic development organization established to empower women, youth, and the less advantaged with business and entrepreneurial knowledge for successful economic posturing. Lownes-Jackson purchased a 6,000-square-foot church facility containing class, training and conference rooms, and offices for ISOA operations.

Since its inception, ISOA has served over 6,000 youth, women, and young men. The organization presently serves these populations through its Women's Executive Roundtable for college aged women, its Men's Executive Roundtable for college aged men, its BEEM (Business Exchange for the Entrepreneurially Minded) Speaker Series that takes business leaders into college and public school classrooms, and its Annual BEEM Career Fair, Nashville's first career fair designed to expose elementary children to career options and positive role models.

Lownes-Jackson is also the co-founder of The World Institute for Sustainable Education and Research (The WISER Group), an international organization which unites educators, researchers, and practitioners to share ideas and philosophies and to foster the economic growth and development of women around the world. The WISER Group provides books and journals to educators, conducts research and provides workshops and training programs along with consulting and coaching services.

== Personal life ==
Lownes-Jackson is married to Dr. Arthur Jackson and has three adult children, one daughter-in-law, and three grandchildren.

== Published works ==
- Flying Solo, How to Build a Profitable Enterprise (2000)
- Encyclopedia of African American Business (2006)
- The Economic Empowerment of Women: A Global Perspective – by Dr. Millicent Lownes-Jackson and Dr. Retta Guy (2012)
- A Review of Internet Usage among Minority-Owned Businesses in the United States (2010)
- Web based Tutorials and Traditional Face to Face Lectures: A Comparative Analysis of Student Performance (2013)
