= John Mills (writer) =

Canadian writer

Howard Edwin "John" Mills (June 23, 1930 – January 16, 2016) was a Canadian writer, professor of medieval literature and publisher of novels and essays.

== Early life and education ==
Mills was born in London, England in 1930 to working-class parents. He went to high school in Sutton, just south of the city. He won a Surrey Agricultural scholarship to The University of Wales at Bangor, but spent most his time mountain climbing and did not graduate.

== Career ==
Mills worked in Scandinavia for a few months, then was conscripted into the British Army in 1950 and served two years, one of them in Germany. He got a job in England as a technical writer, and the immigrated to Canada in 1952. He worked at various jobs, including encyclopaedia salesman and technical writer, and then he became a radar installer first on the Mid-Canada Line, then on the DEW-Line in the Canadian Arctic. He moved to Montreal in 1959 and worked as a tutor and a laundryman.

Mills married in 1960 and moved to Vancouver in 1961, and attended the University of British Columbia. In 1964 he received a Woodrow Wilson Fellowship at Stanford University where he completed a master's degree. In 1965 he finished his graduate work at Stanford and got a job at the then newly opened Simon Fraser University. In 1969 he was an assistant professor of English.

Mills wrote a number of novels and essays, and through part-time studies at the Vancouver School of Theology he received a Master's of Theological Studies degree in 1988. He served as a professor of medieval literature at Simon Fraser until his retirement in 1995 as a Professor Emeritus. In 2014 he lived in Vancouver. Mills died January 16, 2016.

== Publications ==
Some of his essays and books include: The Land of Is (1972), The October Men, Skevington’s Daughter, Runner in the Dark (1992), Lizard in the Grass, Thank your mother for the Rabbits (1993).

Much of his material is more fully available in his book of autobiographical essays called "Thank your mother for the Rabbits". This book was shortlisted for the Hubert Evans Non-fiction Prize in 1994.

=== Books ===
- The Land of Is Oberon Press, 1972
- The October Men Oberon Press, 1974
- Skevington's Daughter Oberon Press,
- Runner in the Dark Oberon Press, 1992
- Lizard in the Grass ECW Press, 1980
- Thank your Mother for the Rabbits Porcupine's Quill Press, 1993
