= Melania Ursu =

Romanian actress

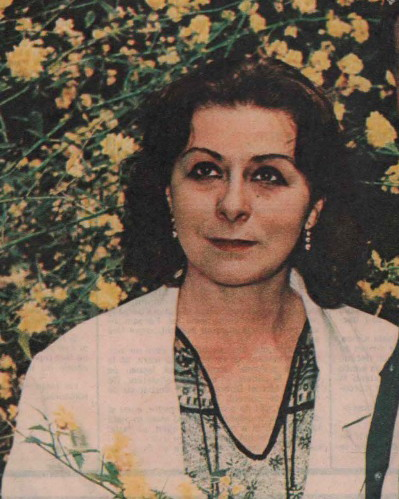
- Born: Melania Ursu; July 16, 1940; Sibiu, Kingdom of Romania
- Died: January 12, 2016 (aged 75); Cluj-Napoca, Romania
- Education: Institute of Theatre and Film Arts (IATC)
- Occupations: Stage actress; film actress
- Employer(s): Cluj-Napoca National Theatre; National Theatre of Târgu Mureș
- Awards: Order of Cultural Merit; Order of the Star of Romania; UNITER award for lifetime achievement

Melania Ursu (July 16, 1940 – January 12, 2016) was a Romanian stage and film actress.

Born in Sibiu, she graduated from the Institute of Theatre and Film Arts (IATC) in 1961. Ursu performed at the Cluj-Napoca National Theatre. From 1977 to 1979 she played at the National Theatre of Târgu Mureș.

In 1969, she was awarded the Order of Cultural Merit, 4th class. Her most prominent award was the Order of the Star of Romania, Knight class. In 2012 she received the UNITER (Romanian Theatrical Union) award for lifetime achievement.

Ursu died in 2016 in Cluj-Napoca, of a heart attack.

== Filmography ==
- Gaudeamus igitur (1965)
- Mere roșii ("Red Apples", 1975)
- Misterul lui Herodot ("The Mystery of Herodotus", 1976)
- Iarba verde de acasă ("Green Grass of Home", 1977)
- Vis de ianuarie ("January Dream", 1979)
- Intoarcerea lui Vodă Lăpușneanu ("The return of Vodă Lăpușneanu", 1980)
- Munții în flăcări ("Mountains on Fire", 1980)
- Dragostea mea călătoare ("My Beloved Traveler", 1980)
- Pădureanca ("The Forest Woman", 1986)
- Flăcări pe comori ("Flames over Treasures", 1987)
- Meditație lacustră ("Lake Meditation", 1995)
- Păcatele Evei ("Eva's Sins", 2005)
- Feedback (2006)
- Caravana cinematografică ("Kino Caravan", 2009)
