= Alice Denham =

American writer and model (1927–2016)

- Denham in 1962

Playboy centerfold appearance
- July 1956
- Preceded by: Gloria Walker
- Succeeded by: Jonnie Nicely

Personal details
- Born: January 21, 1927 Jacksonville, Florida, U.S.
- Died: January 27, 2016 (aged 89) New York City, U.S.
- Height: 5 ft 2 in (157 cm)

Alice Denham (January 21, 1927 – January 27, 2016) was an American writer and model. She was Playboy magazine's Playmate of the Month for the July 1956 issue.

== Early life ==
Denham was born in Jacksonville and raised in Coral Gables and Chevy Chase, Maryland. She graduated from the University of North Carolina as a member of Phi Beta Kappa, before earning a scholarship to the University of Rochester where she graduated with a master's degree in English in 1950. She wrote her thesis on the plays of T. S. Eliot.

She was a cousin of Denham Fouts, an international socialite who was the lover of several prominent gay figures.

== Career ==
After finishing her degree, Denham immediately moved to New York City, where she aspired to be a writer and began modeling to earn money. She posed at "camera clubs", underground organizations that circumvented laws restricting the production of nude photos. She also posed for a variety of magazine and book covers as well as comic strips and film posters. She wrote stories for pulp magazines, occasionally also posing for the covers and illustrations; an issue of the men's magazine True Adventures featured her on the cover while including her short story "Girl Gun Runners of Saigon". Denham was Playboy magazine's Playmate of the Month for the July 1956 issue, which also included a reprinting of her story "The Deal", accompanied by an illustration by LeRoy Neiman. However, the magazine rejected two of her subsequent stories after it decided to no longer feature women's bylines.

After moving to New York, Denham quickly befriended James Baldwin, Jack Kerouac and James Dean; she met Dean through her friend Christine White and was occasionally romantically involved with him. She regularly attended literary parties in New York, where she aggressively pursued budding and successful male writers. She allegedly had relationships with numerous notable figures including Nelson Algren, Ad Reinhardt, Hugh Hefner, James Jones, Anatole Broyard, Evan S. Connell, Joseph Heller, William Gaddis, Gardner McKay, David Markson, and Philip Roth. She also counted Norman Mailer as one of her friends and met many literary figures through attending his parties. Most of her relationships were with married men.

Denham struggled for many years to secure a publishing deal for her debut novel, about an affair between an artist and a composer. It was finally published in 1967 under the title My Darling from the Lions. In the meantime, she worked writing jacket copy for publishers and modeled at commercial shows, appearing as Miss Minute Maid of 1957 and 1958. She also appeared in several films, debuting in The Twilight Girls (1957), appearing as a nudist in All of Me (1963), and starring in Warm Nights and Hot Pleasures, Olga's Girls, and Olga's House of Shame (all 1964). In 1973, she released her second novel, Amo, an erotic feminist science fiction tale about a "centerfold from outer space". She also penned the novelisations Adios, Sabata (1971) and The Ghost and Mrs. Muir (1968).

An early second wave feminist, Denham campaigned to legalize abortion and was a member of the National Organization for Women's original chapter. In the 1970s, she served as an associate professor at John Jay College of the City University of New York. During this time, she participated in a discrimination case of the Equal Employment Opportunity Commission that was settled in the faculty women's favor for $3.5 million.

Denham was the subject of a musical composition by Fluxus artist Al Hansen; "Alice Denham In 48 Seconds".

In 2006, she published Sleeping with Bad Boys, an intimate memoir about her experiences in the New York circle of writers in the 1950s and 1960s. It was followed in 2013 by her book Secrets of San Miguel, which contained stories about the bohemian community in San Miguel de Allende, Mexico, and was inspired by her numerous visits to the city.

== Personal life ==
Denham was divorced once. In 1980, she married John Mueller, an accountant.

She died in Manhattan on January 27, 2016, from complications of ovarian cancer, at the age of 89.

Lynn Turner	Marguerite Empey	Marian Stafford	Rusty Fisher	Marion Scott	Gloria Walker
Alice Denham	Jonnie Nicely	Elsa Sørensen	Janet Pilgrim	Betty Blue	Lisa Winters
