= Peter Robinson (New Zealand musician) =

New Zealand musician (1958–2016)

Peter David Mills Robinson (24 August 1958 – 28 January 2016) was a New Zealand musician who played keyboards in The Tin Syndrome in the early 1980s. He also played on recordings with Circus Block 4 and Violet Summer, and, under the alias David Mills, with Anthony McCarten's mid-1980s musical project "Anthony Takes A Bath".

Robinson lived in Wellington for many years, where he was a recognisable local identity and was regarded as a talented pianist and innovative synthesizer player. In recent years, he frequently played with Wellington's The Synth Orchestra, under the name Peter R, The Druid.

Robinson died at his home in Wellington on 28 January 2016.
