= Vicente Troudart =

Panamanian baseball umpire

Vicente Troudart was a Panamanian baseball umpire who worked numerous international events, including the 2004 Olympics. He died January 9, 2016, at 64 years old.
