= Zaw Zaw Aung (writer) =

Zaw Zaw Aung (Burmese: ဇော်ဇော်အောင်; 1937–2016) was a Burmese author, critic and public intellectual, best known for introducing the concepts of modernism and post-modernism to Burmese readers. He was born in Monywa, and attended Mandalay University. He earned a master's degree from Rangoon University and later taught there. Aung died in Rangoon on January 26, 2016.
