= Alberto Iniesta Jiménez =

Spanish Catholic prelate

His Excellency Alberto Iniesta Jiménez
- Titular Bishop of Tubernuca
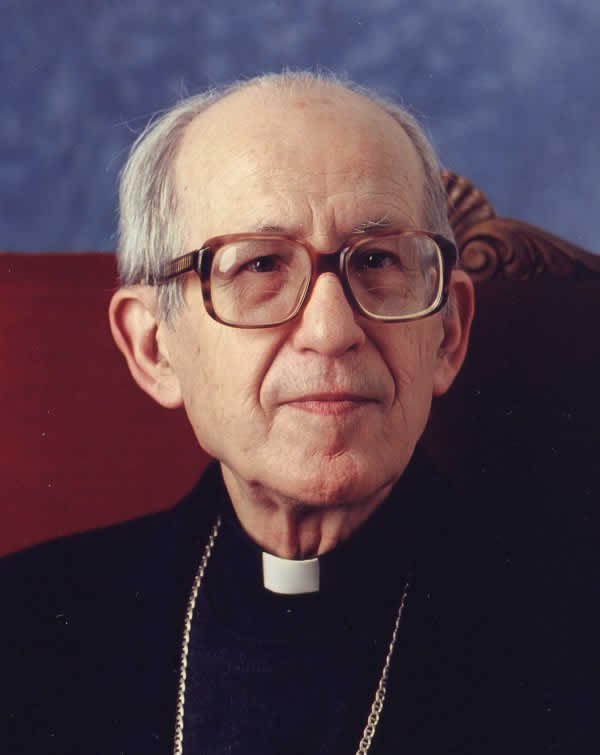
- A picture of Bishop Alberto Iniesta Jiménez
- Church: Roman Catholic Church
- See: Titular See of Tubernuca
- In office: 1972–2016
- Predecessor: none
- Successor: incumbent

Orders
- Ordination: 13 July 1958

Personal details
- Born: 4 January 1923 Albacete, Spain
- Died: 3 January 2016 (aged 92)

Alberto Iniesta Jiménez (4 January 1923 – 3 January 2016) was a Spanish prelate of the Catholic Church.

Iniesta Jiménez was born in Albacete and ordained a priest on 13 July 1958. He was appointed titular bishop of the Tubernuca as well as auxiliary archbishop of the Archdiocese of Madrid on 5 September 1972. He was ordained a bishop on 22 October 1972. Iniesta Jiménez retired as auxiliary archbishop on 5 April 1998.
