= Oscar Wiggli =

Swiss sculptor and composer (1927–2016)

- Born: 9 March 1927; Olten, Switzerland
- Died: 26 January 2016 (aged 88); Delémont, Switzerland
- Education: ETH Zurich, Académie de la Grande Chaumière
- Known for: Iron and steel sculpture, electroacoustic music

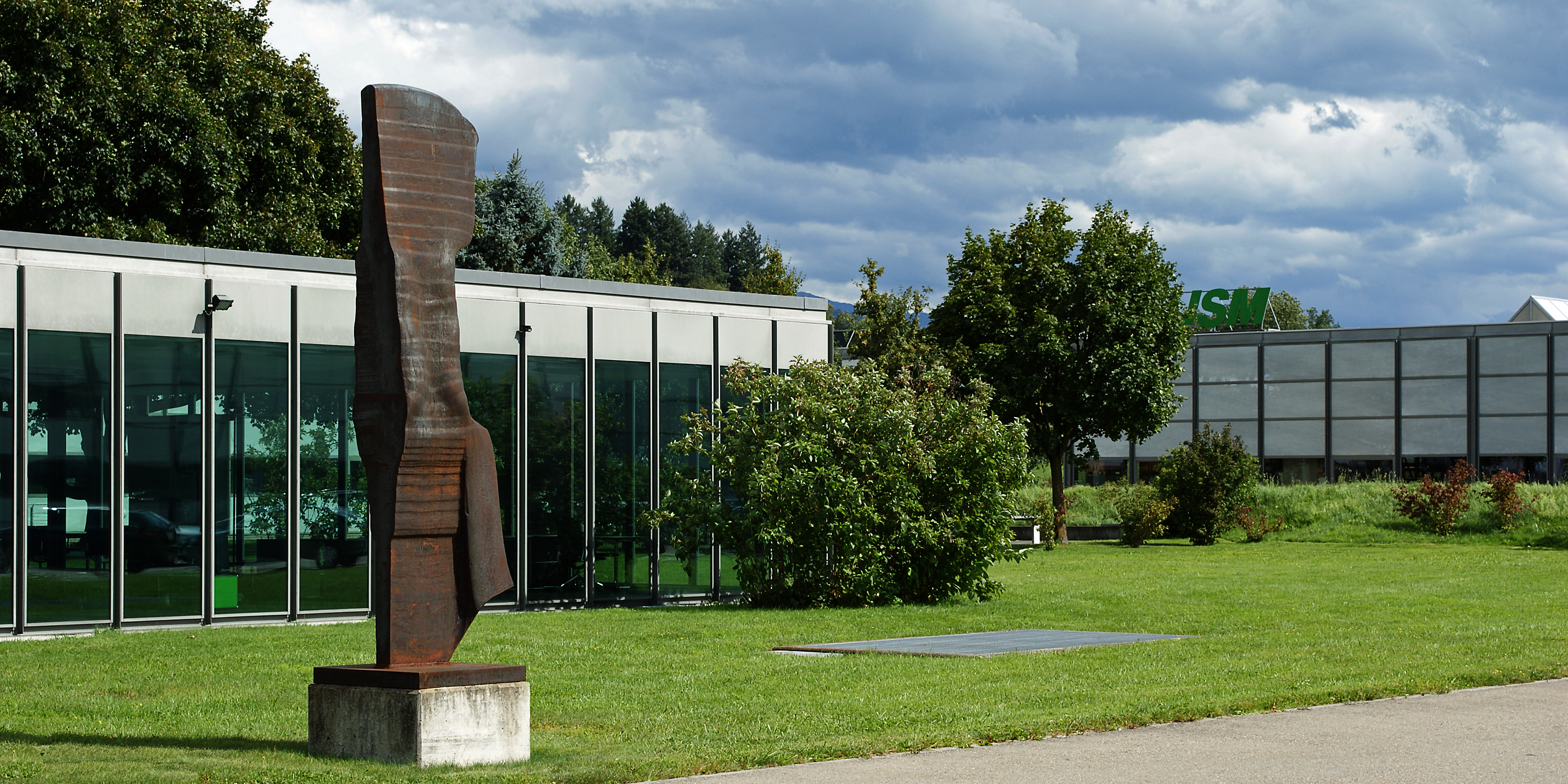
USM pavilion with a sculpture by Wiggli

Oscar Wiggli (9 March 1927 – 26 January 2016) was a Swiss sculptor and composer known for abstract forged-iron sculptures. He exhibited at the Venice Biennale in 1980.

== Biography ==
Oscar Wiggli was born on 9 March 1927 in Olten. His father, Emil Wiggli, was a secondary-school teacher, and his mother, Rosa Klein, was a primary-school teacher and painter. He grew up in Solothurn and completed his secondary education there in 1946. From 1946 to 1949, Wiggli trained as a mechanic. From 1949 to 1951, Wiggli studied science and architecture at ETH Zurich before settling in Paris. He trained as a sculptor at the Académie de la Grande Chaumière until 1953. In 1954, he worked for a stonemason in Grosshöchstetten.

In 1955, Wiggli began experimenting with forging. In 1956, he married the painter, graphic artist and photographer Janine Maria Moulin. From the same year, he maintained studios in Montrouge and Muriaux. Wiggli received Federal Art Scholarships in 1957, 1958 and 1960, and the Kiefer-Hablitzel Scholarship in 1960. Between 1968 and 1976, he continued developing his forging technique in a number of workshops. He received the Solothurn Art Prize in 1974.

In 2002, the Oscar and Janine Wiggli Foundation was established. He received the Prix des arts, des lettres et des sciences of the Canton of Jura in 2009. Wiggli died on 26 January 2016 in Delémont.

== Work ==
=== Sculpture ===
Wiggli worked across iron and steel sculpture, electroacoustic music, drawing, printmaking and photography. The abstracted human figure was central to his visual art. From the 1950s, he was internationally known for his iron sculpture, as well as for drawing and printmaking. Wiggli is regarded as one of Switzerland’s leading artists of abstract forged-iron sculpture.

Wiggli's early sculpture included female nudes in plaster, as well as portrait heads and animal figures in stone and bronze. From 1956, he produced abstract sculptures from sheet iron. His training as a mechanic gave him a technical foundation for working with forged iron. He moved from cold-worked metal to forging iron plates, using a welding torch and forging hammers. As his methods developed, his forms became simpler and his sculptures increased in size, becoming larger than life from the mid-1970s. In some works from 1969 onwards, he reduced the composition to only a few elements, while his later work moved towards monolithic forms. In 1977, Wiggli installed a large mechanical forging hammer at his Muriaux studio, allowing him to shape iron plates up to two centimetres thick.

In 1987, Wiggli completed his first large-scale iron sculpture at an industrial forge. From 1988 to 1994, he worked at Von Roll’s industrial facilities in Gerlafingen. In 1988, he learned to shape heavy pieces of glowing metal in Von Roll’s open-die forge, a technique he used to produce monolithic sculptures. His sculpture EOS was installed in the courtyard of Porrentruy Castle in 1989 as part of celebrations marking ten years since the founding of the Canton of Jura. He also created a large multi-layered sculpture for the Kantonsschule Hardwald in Olten, installed at the school entrance.

=== Photography and music ===
During the 1960s, Wiggli produced experimental photography. He used double exposure to combine images of female figures with his iron sculptures in the series Superpositions. From the 1980s, he turned increasingly to electroacoustic music. After studying synthesizer techniques in Paris in 1981–82, Wiggli and his wife built a synthesizer. He subsequently experimented with sound and composition. His compositions incorporated sounds produced during forging, including hammer blows, and were presented at exhibitions and festivals as well as on radio. In 2004, he gave a concert at Zurich’s Hochschule für Musik at the invitation of the International Society for Contemporary Music. Between 1981 and 2007, he released around a dozen CDs of his compositions.

=== Collections ===
Wiggli’s work is held in Swiss public collections including the Aargauer Kunsthaus, Kunstmuseum Bern, Kunstmuseum Olten, Kunstmuseum Solothurn, Kunstmuseum Winterthur and Kunsthaus Zürich.

== Exhibitions ==
Wiggli began exhibiting in Switzerland and internationally in 1956. His work was shown at the Städtische Kunstgalerie in Bochum in 1968, the Kunsthalle Bern in 1972, Kunstmuseum Winterthur and Kunstmuseum Solothurn in 1977, and the Venice Biennale in 1980. Other exhibitions included the Musée d’art et d’histoire in Fribourg in 1990 and Kunstmuseum Bochum in 1994.

To mark Wiggli’s 80th birthday in 2007, the Kunstmuseum Bern and the Zentrum Paul Klee jointly presented his work in the exhibition Oscar Wiggli: Body – Space – Sound. The exhibition surveyed his sculpture, drawings, photography, film and electroacoustic music.

== Gallery ==
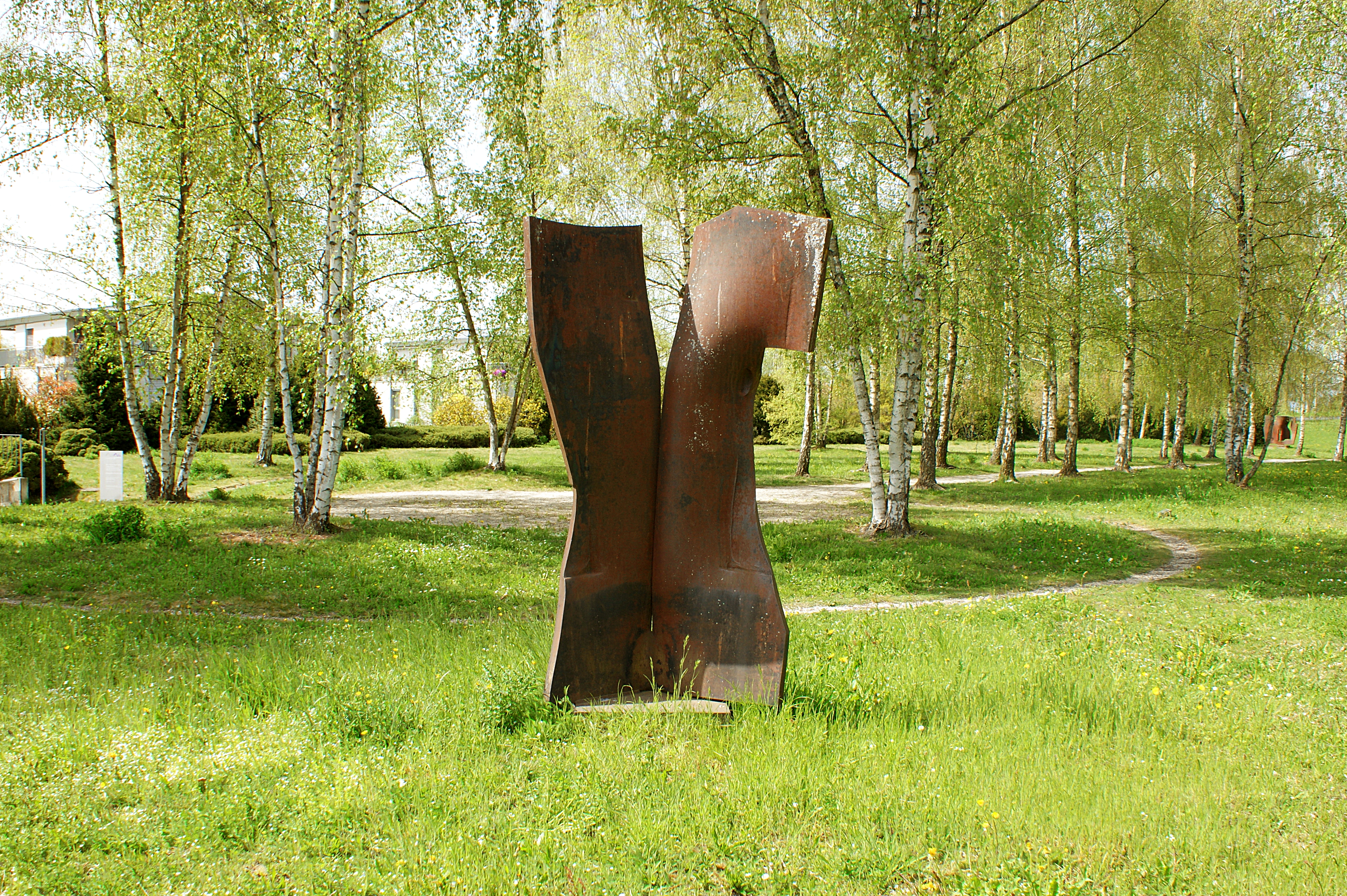
Elnac, Corten steel sculpture (1991)

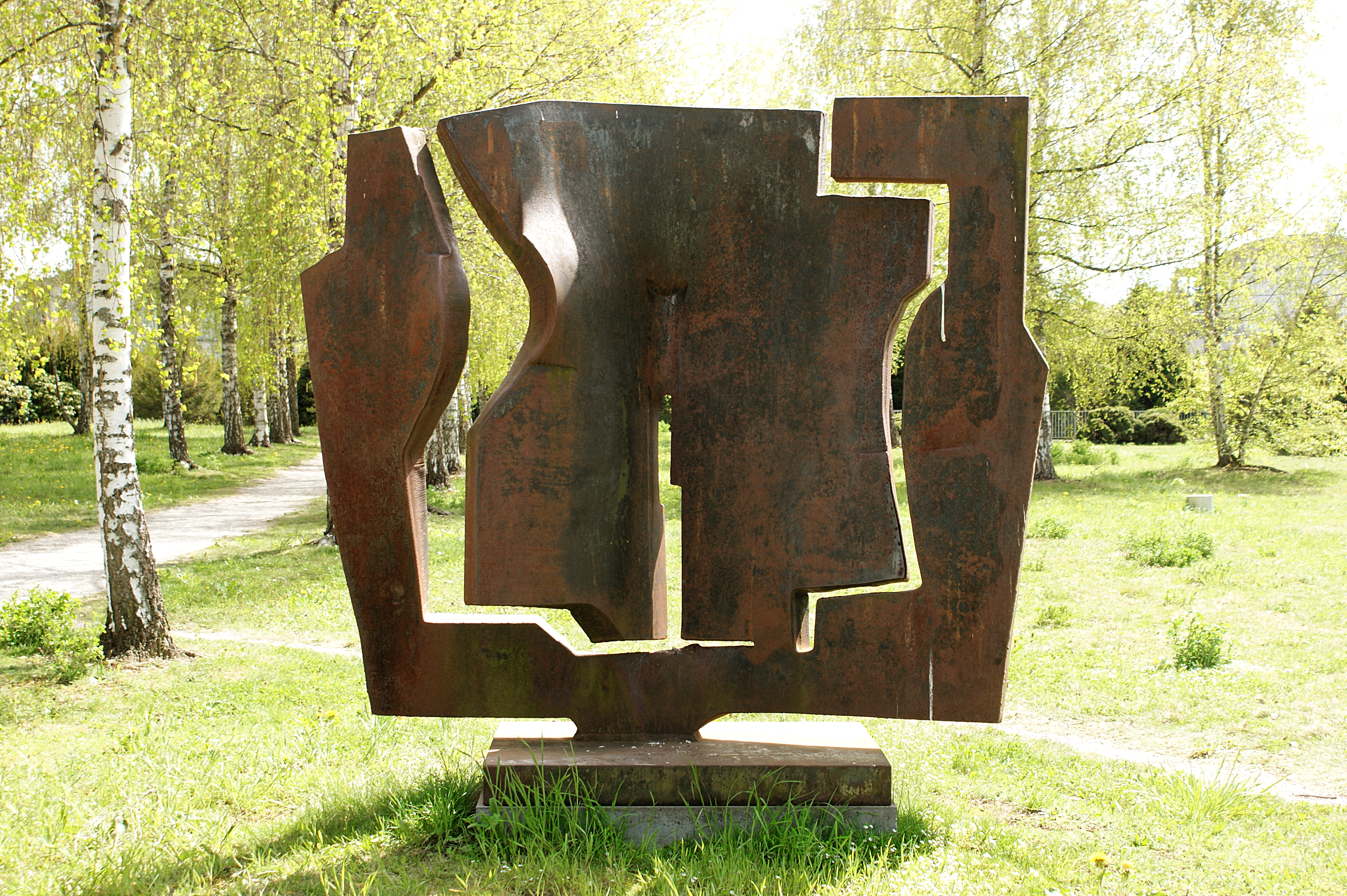
Loaraden, steel sculpture (1993)

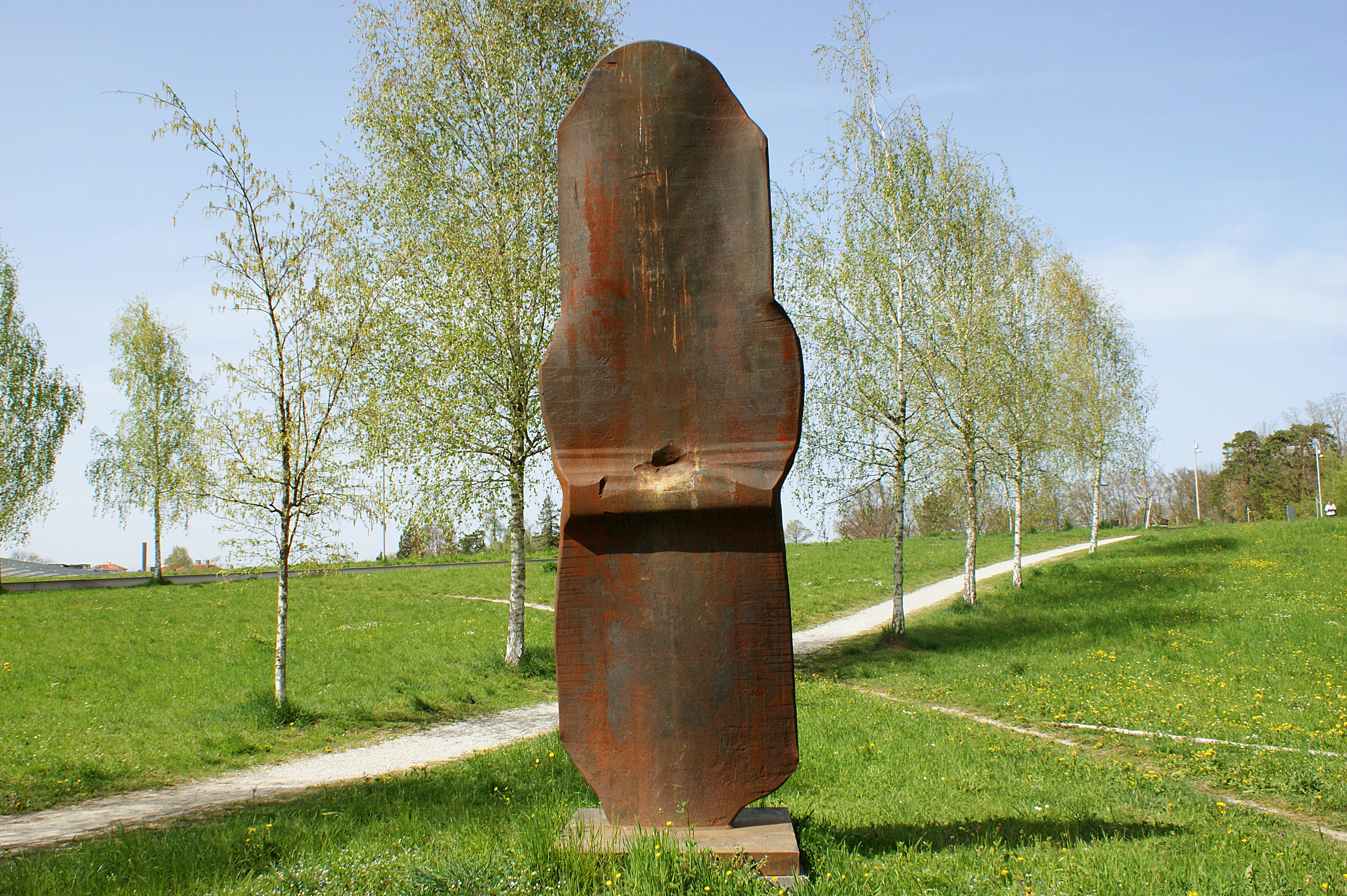
Canrac, steel sculpture (1996)
