= Holly Hogrobrooks =

American civil rights activist

- Born: September 8, 1940; Houston, Texas, USA
- Died: January 22, 2016 (aged 75); Memphis, Tennessee, USA
- Occupations: Activist, journalist

Holly Adrienne Hogrobrooks (September 8, 1940 – January 22, 2016) was an American civil rights activist and journalist in Houston, Texas. She was a leader of the Progressive Youth Association, active in student protests against racial segregation in 1960 and 1961.

== Early life ==
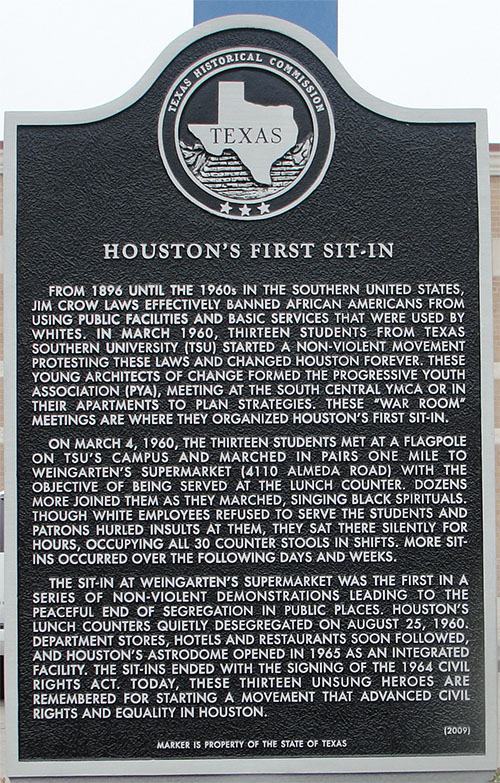
Houston Sit-in Historical Marker

Holly Hogrobrooks was born in Houston, the daughter of Theodore Marcus Hogrobrooks and Euneida Mae Goens Hogrobrooks. She attended the Mather School in South Carolina. As a student at Texas Southern University, she was a founding member of the Progressive Youth Association, and its successor, the Sit-In Foundation.

== Career ==
In 1960, while she was a college student, Hogrobrooks organized the first sit-in protest against racial segregation at a Houston lunch counter, and worked with Freedom Riders in 1961, to desegregate train stations. She was jailed at least twice for her civil rights activism. She was later a journalist at the Houston Informer and the Houston Forward Times, worked in public relations, and taught at her alma mater, Texas Southern University, until she retired in 2000.

== Personal life ==
Hogrobrooks married Joseph D. Brown in 1969. They divorced in 1979. She was survived by a daughter when she died in 2016, aged 75 years, in Memphis, Tennessee.
