= The Tin Syndrome =

- Origin: Wellington, New Zealand
- Genres: Alternative rock, new wave
- Years active: 1981–1985
- Labels: Jayrem Records
- Past members: Mark Austin; David Long; Peter Robinson; Kevin McGill; Paul Sainsbury; Malcolm Reid

The Tin Syndrome was an alternative rock group from Wellington, New Zealand, active in the early to mid 1980s. Led by quirky songwriter/guitarist Mark Austin (New Zealand Composer), the band was noted for its off-beat sound, energetic delivery and frenetic lyrics, as found in such early songs as "Random Wellingtonian" and "Plastic Bag". From late 1981 to mid 1984 The Tin Syndrome was a popular live act in its home town of Wellington, where its unique and complex arrangements had an enduring influence on the local music scene.

== History ==
The Tin Syndrome began at a time when there was little infrastructure to support or nurture local bands in New Zealand. The group evolved from short-lived punk band Boots and Sneakers, formed by ex Hutt Valley schoolmates Mark Austin and Kevin McGill, which played some gigs around Wellington in 1980 with Paul Sainsbury on drums. When they brought in Peter Robinson (New Zealand Musician) (keyboards) and replaced their vocalist with a second guitarist, 16-year-old David Long, The Tin Syndrome was created, although it was a few more months before their eventual drummer, Malcolm Reid, was found. The band members allegedly taught themselves to play their instruments and liked to repeat musical accidents in their arrangements, calling their music unorthodox while in reality their song-writing was sophisticated and melodic. Their early gigs produced an immediate following, complete with a few "instant disciples" and their popularity among a large committed fan base stemmed from there. Their two main stage appearances at Hawke's Bay’s 10,000 strong Brown Trout rock festival in the summer of 1982-83, including the coveted 10pm Friday night slot, attracted national media coverage and a commercial-sounding vinyl EP "The Tin Syndrome", produced for Jayrem Records by Ian Morris (musician) of Th' Dudes, was released the following June, topping the charts in Wellington and officially peaking at no.16 on the NZ national sales chart. (Unofficially, it reached the top 5 the following week but this coincided with the dominant record retail chain of the time and sole distributor of Jayrem product, Chelsea Records, having its chart returns for the week excluded from consideration by the Recording Industry Association of New Zealand as part of its random sampling process.) The group was constantly developing its sound and the EP had captured a period when they were experimenting with a "particularly glossy aesthetic", but by the time of its delayed release, they were no longer comfortable with the record or the video for "Street Song", filmed in Dec '82, which had grabbed media attention. After a few months off the scene they came back, in early '84, with a busy performing schedule, a new repertoire and one member less - but following some memorable gigs that winter, were not seen again until the release, on vinyl, of their album "No Ordinary Sickness", produced with their devoted sound-man Mark Ingram in early '85. The album was unrelenting in its quirkiness and polarized opinion, but did draw some very favourable reviews and the first two pressings sold out within a couple of months. A video was made for the single "The Package to Sell" (which later became the title track of a Jayrem Records compilation released that year). The album also spawned the student radio hits "American Blessing" and "Don’t Want to Be a Statistic". Like many things about The Tin Syndrome, the group's demise was quite mysterious. No announcement was ever made but all the members were in other bands before the album was released and it slowly became evident that the winter 1984 gigs had in fact been their last.

== Legacy ==
The Tin Syndrome comprised a collection of distinctive original musicians who are known to have influenced other NZ musicians. Long, who was just 16 when he played his first gig with this band, went on to international fame in the 1990s with The Mutton Birds and, in an era when few other NZ groups had a significant keyboard presence in their sound, Robinson was something of a pioneer, working with analog synthesizers without the benefit of sequencers, samplers, or even preset sounds. The group was known for being colourful and theatrical (in 1984 Austin was even shown acting in a play in a TV special on Wellington music) and coming, as they did, before such wacky Wellington bands as the Six Volts, they did a lot to define the eccentric character of the Wellington sound. Both Austin and Long have gone on to be successful soundtrack composers. Sound man Mark Ingram, who cut his teeth with this band, went on to be a music producer of international renown, in Australia.

== Discography ==
Date of Release	Title	Label	Charted	Country	Catalog Number
1983	The Tin Syndrome - EP	Jayrem	30 (singles chart)	New Zealand	JAY-104
1985	No Ordinary Sickness - Album	Jayrem	23 (album chart)	New Zealand	JAY-319
1985	Package To Sell (compilation - Various NZ Artists, featuring The Tin Syndrome)	Jayrem	-	New Zealand	BURT-6
