= Ruth Rehmann =

German writer (1922–2016)

Ruth Rehmann (June 1, 1922 – January 29, 2016) was a German writer.

== Life ==
Rehmann was born in Siegburg, the daughter of a local pastor. She studied in Hamburg with the aim of becoming a translator; and then she studied art history, German literature and music. During the 1950s, she worked as a violinist, as a teacher and as a press secretary at the American and Indian embassies. In 1983, Rehmann ran as a Green Party candidate for a seat in the Bundestag.

In 1959, Rehmann published her first novel Illusions (Illusionen). She had attracted much attention when she read a chapter from that book at the Group 47 conference in 1958. Her second novel The People in the Valley (Die Leute im Tal) won first prize in a literature contest. Later novels include:

- The Man in the Pulpit (Der Mann auf der Kanzel) (1979)
- Farewell from the master class (Abschied von der Meisterklasse) (1985)
- The Woman from Schwaig Farm (Die Schwaigerin) (1987)

She has also written several radio plays and some short stories.
