= Stephanie Rader =

Stephanie C. Rader
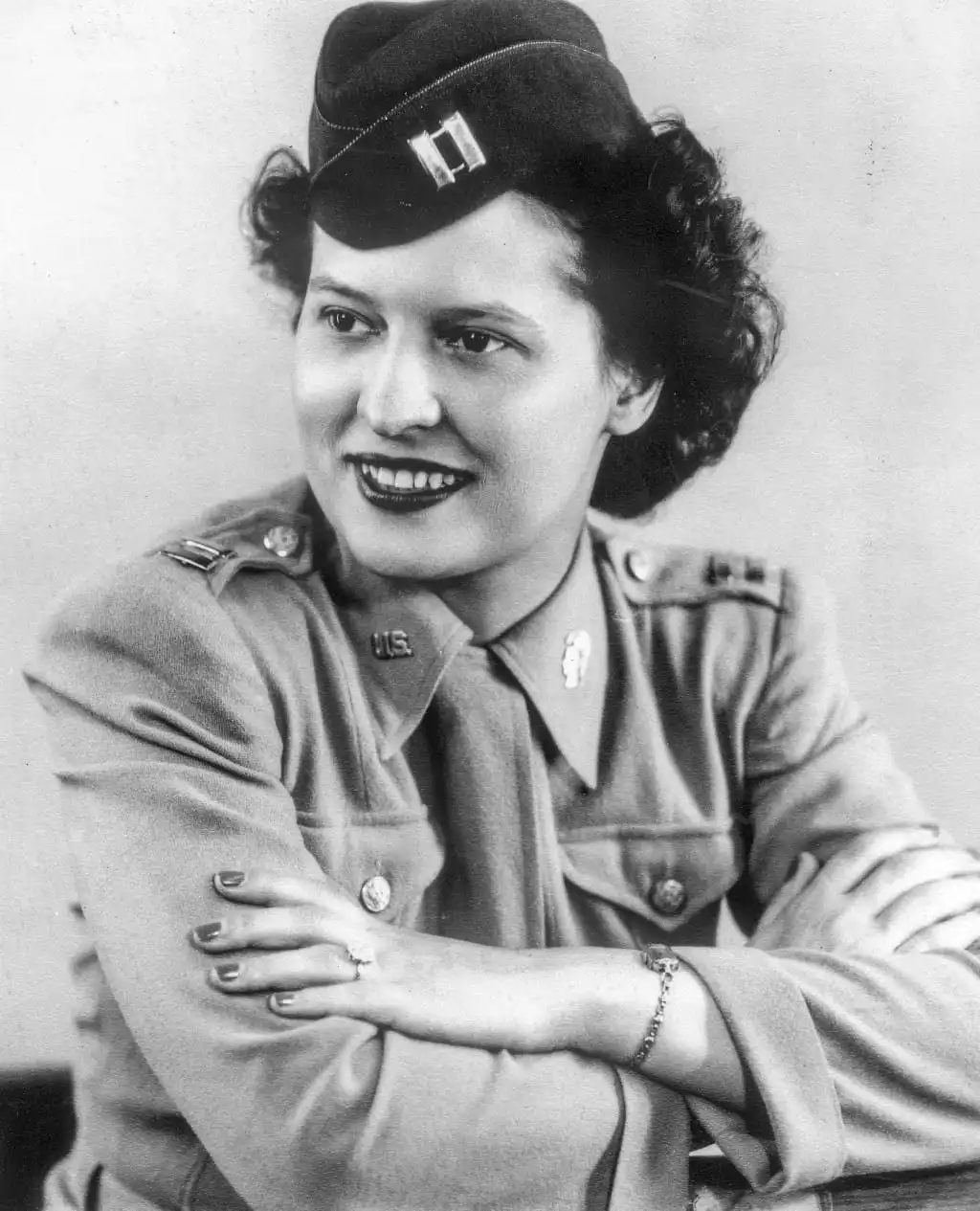
- Born: May 15, 1915; Toledo, Ohio, U.S.
- Died: January 21, 2016 (aged 100); Alexandria, Virginia, U.S.
- Other name: Stephanie Czech Rader
- Education: Cornell University
- Occupations: Undercover intelligence agent, librarian
- Employer: Texas Oil Company
- Organization(s): Office of Strategic Services, Women’s Army Corps

Stephanie Czech Rader (May 15, 1915 – January 21, 2016) was an American undercover intelligence agent.

She was born to Polish immigrants in Toledo, Ohio, and was raised only knowing the Polish language and culture. As she did not speak English well, she had some difficulties at school at first, but eventually earned a full scholarship to Cornell University where she completed a chemistry degree in 1937.

Rader joined the Women’s Army Corps towards the end of World War II and was soon selected for service in the Office of Strategic Services due to her knowledge of Polish culture. She was one of two OSS agents working out of the U.S. Embassy in Warsaw and traveled the country under the guise of finding family members in the aftermath of World War II.

This allowed her to acquire intelligence on Russian troop movements and socio-economic information unobtainable by Embassy officials. She was, by all definitions, a spy. She knew that if she were captured, she would disappear. "They gave me a gun, but I never carried a gun ... What the heck was I gonna do with a dumb gun?", she said.

== Death ==
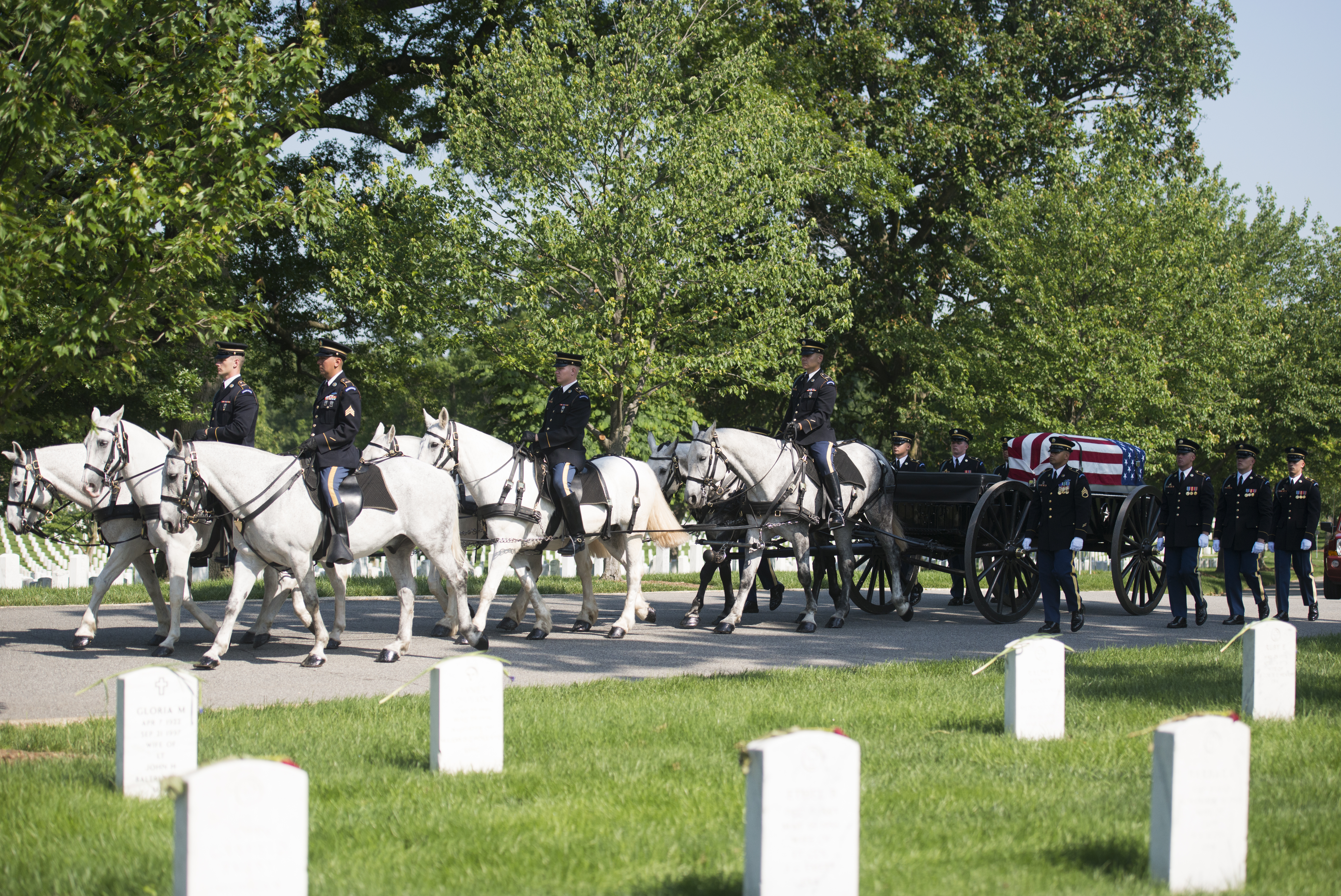
Rader's funeral at Arlington National Cemetery in June 2016

Rader died in 2016 at the age of 100 in her Alexandria, Virginia, home. Only very late in her life did her friends and neighbors realize that she was one of the most successful intelligence agents of post-war Poland. In the years shortly before her death, her friends and neighbors, together with the Office of Strategic Services Society, championed on her behalf for her to be awarded the Legion of Merit. Her superior officers had recommended her for this award in 1946 but the request was turned down by the War Department for unknown reasons.
