= Thrisadee Sahawong =

Thai actor (1980–2016)

- ทฤษฎี สหวงษ์
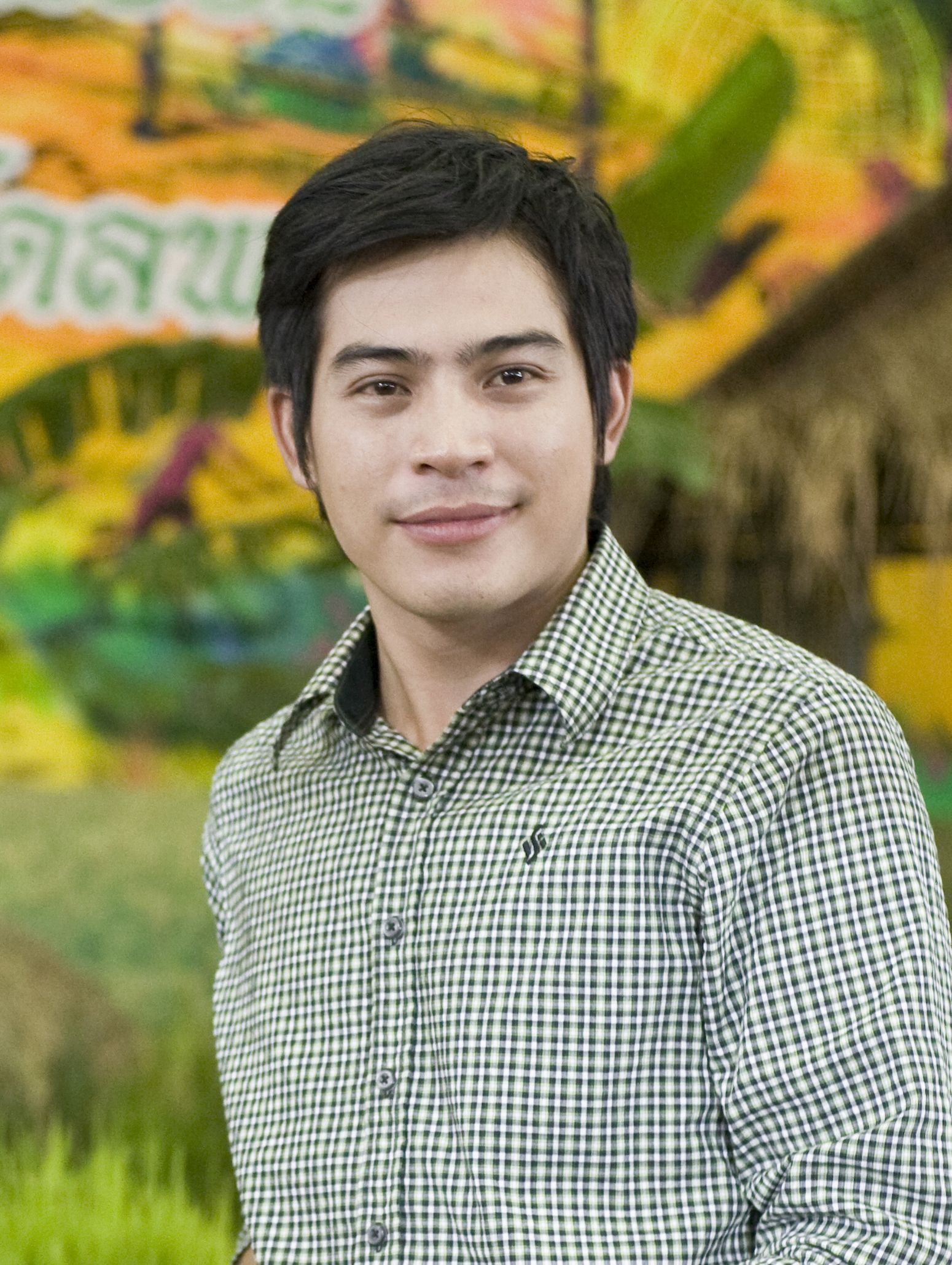
- Thrisadee in 2009
- Born: 23 January 1980; Buriram, Thailand
- Died: 18 January 2016 (aged 35); Bangkok, Thailand
- Occupation: Actor
- Years active: 2005–2016
- Spouse: Vanda Mutthasuwan
- Children: Phakwan Sahawong

Thrisadee Sahawong (Thai: ทฤษฎี สหวงษ์), (23 January 1980 – 18 January 2016), nicknamed Por (Thai: ปอ), was a Thai actor. He had an exclusive contract with Channel 3 (Thailand). He is best known for his roles in Phoo Yai Lee Kab Nang Ma (2011), Mon Rak Luk Thung (2012), Sao Noei Roi Ran (2016), etc.

== Early life and career ==
He was born in Buriram Province, on 23 January 1980. He was the son of Sanguan Sahawong and Phitsamai Sahawong, and had two brothers. He finished his secondary class education from Buriram Pittayakhom School. He was successful in his education test to university class after secondary 5 and he finished his university education in Chandrakasem Rajabhat University.

After he finished his studies, he worked at Siam Commercial Bank, and took modelling jobs part-time. In 2004, he received the "Kleo Young" award. After receiving the award, he then started his career as an on-stage entertainer, which later led to an exclusive contract with Channel 3 (Thailand) in 2005. His first TV Soap Opera was "Likasit Huajai".

== Personal life ==
He was married to Wanda Mutthasuwan, Taekwondo sportspeople and journalist in 2013, after being pals for 10 years. They have a daughter, Phakwan "Mali" Sahawong, who was born on 24 October 2013.

== Death ==
Sahawong contracted dengue fever in 2015 and was taken to a private hospital before being transferred and hospitalized in Ramathibodi Hospital. Despite hard efforts by his doctors including an artificial heart lung machine and amputation on one of his legs, he succumbed to his illness and died on 18 January 2016, at the age of 35 years.

== Partial filmography ==
- "Likasit Huajai" (2005)
- Phoo Yai Lee Kab Nang Ma (2011)
- Mon Rak Luk Thung (2012)
- Sao Noi Loy Larn (2016)
- Tan Chai Kammalor (2016)
