= Vasilya Fattakhova =

Russian singer (1979–2016)

Background information
- Born: Василя Разифовна Фаттахова; 31 December 1979; Beloretsk, Russian SSR, Soviet Union
- Died: 26 January 2016 (aged 36) Ufa, Bashkortostan, Russia
- Genres: Tatar music, pop music, pop-folk
- Occupation: Singer
- Years active: 2000–2016
- Formerly of: Aydar Galimov

Vasilya Razifovna Fattakhova (Russian: Василя Разифовна Фаттахова, Tatar: Вәсилә Разиф кызы Фәттахова, romanized: Väsilä Razif qızı Fättaxova, 31 December 1979, Beloretsk – 26 January 2016, Ufa) was a Tatar singer from Bashkortostan. She was declared an Honored Artist of the Republic of Tatarstan (2015) and Honored Artist of the Republic of Bashkortostan (2015). She first gained popularity among the Tatars and Bashkirs for performing the song "Tugan Yak" by composer Ural Rashitov.

== Early life ==
Fattakhova was born on 31 December 1979, in Beloretsk, Bashkortostan. She graduated from the choir department of Uchaly College of Arts and Culture.

In 1999 she entered the Ufa State Institute of Arts in the vocal department. In October, she left on tour with Aidar Galimov's band as a backup singer.

== Career ==
Fattakhova is most famous for her hit "Tugan Yak" (Homeland), performed in the Tatar language, which gained fame throughout Russia and elsewhere. Most of the song consists of only her voice and percussion, omitting the bayan, which is nearly universal in Tatar music. The song was recognized as the best in the category "International Song" at the variety festival "Crystal Nightingale" and among "The best hits of the 10th anniversary" of the annual international festival "Tatar җyry" Tatar song in 2008.

Other well-known songs include "Әytelmәgәn mәhәbbәt" (2002, "The unspoken love", includes an option in the Bashkir language, sung in duet with Aydar Galimov), "Yalgyz milesh" (Lonely rowan tree), "Etiem" (The Father), "Almagach chechage" (Apple Blossom), "Shakhter Kary" (The Song of the Miner). Fattakhova performed an annual tour called "Every spring".

== Personal life and death ==
Fattakhova had been married to Ilgiz Gabderakypov since 2007. In 2011, their son Karim was born. Fattakhova gave birth to their daughter Kamila on 27 December 2015. As the birth of their daughter was very difficult, she was taken to the intensive care unit of the Republican Clinical Hospital in Ufa. Although doctors performed five surgeries, they were unable to save the singer. As a result, Fattakhova died at the Republican Clinical Hospital in Ufa on 26 January 2016, at the age of 36. She was buried at the "Walk of Fame" of the Southern Cemetery in Ufa.

== Discography ==
- 2002 – Туган як (Homeland)
- 2008 – Мәхәббәт кыллары (Strings of Love)
- 2012 – The Best
- 2016 – Ашыгасын... (Let's hurry...)
