= Zbigniew Zychowicz =

Polish politician and member of the Democratic Left Alliance

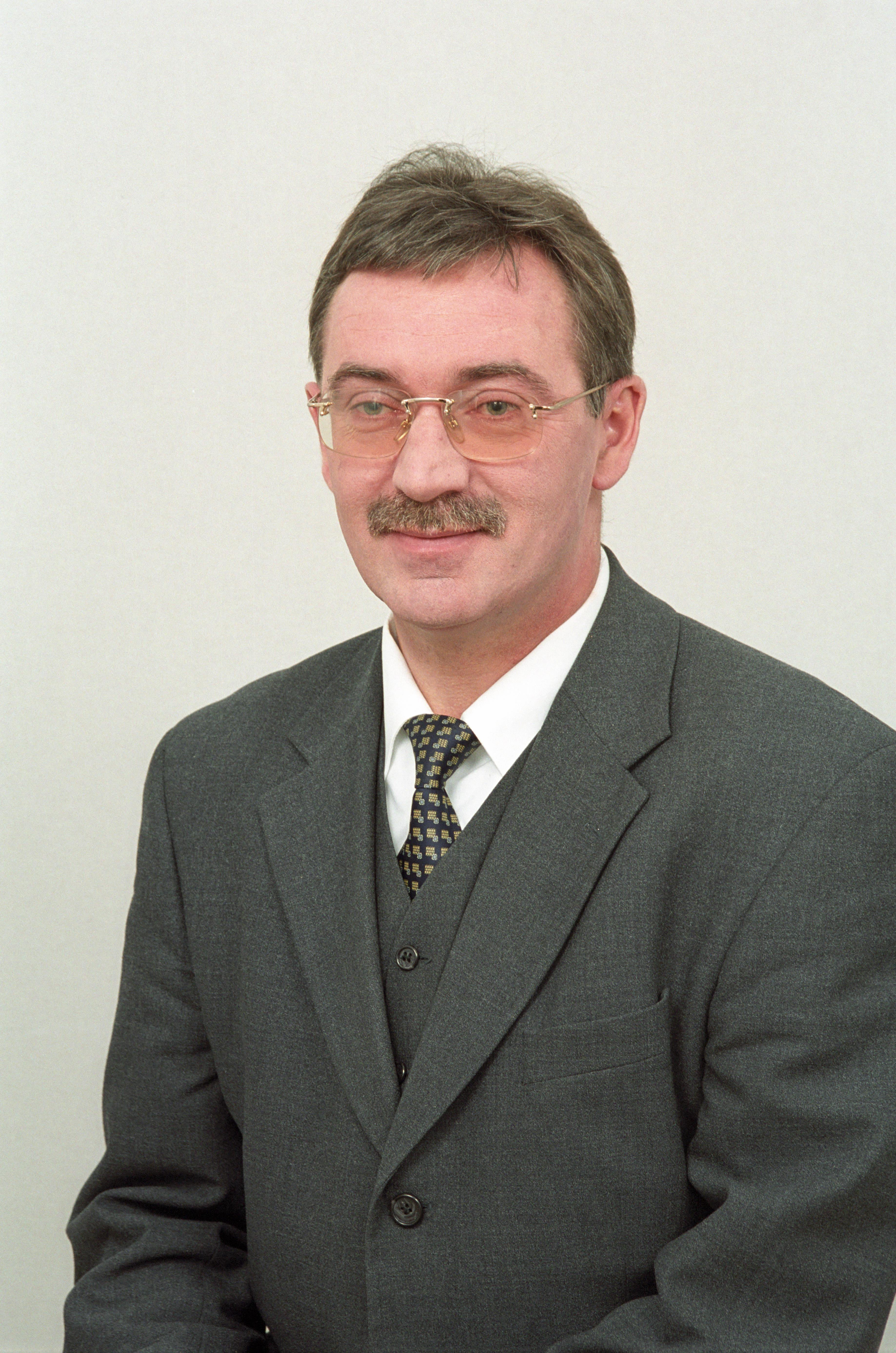

Marshal of West Pomeranian Voivodeship
- In office 1 January 1999 – 26 January 2000
- Preceded by: office created
- Succeeded by: Józef Faliński

Personal details
- Born: 29 April 1953 Miastko
- Party: Democratic Left Alliance
- Education: Agricultural University in Szczecin
- Awards: Badge of Honor for Merits to the Local Government Badge of Honor of the West Pomeranian Griffin

Zbigniew Stanisław Zychowicz (April 29, 1953 – January 6, 2016) was a Polish politician and member of the Democratic Left Alliance (SDL). He served as the Voivodeship Marshal of West Pomeranian Voivodeship from 1999 to 2000. He was a deputy to the Senate of Poland for IV and V term.

== Biography ==
He was born in 1953 in Miastko to a working-class family. In 1978 he graduated from agricultural economics at the Agricultural University in Szczecin. He has also completed postgraduate studies of rural sociology and agriculture at the Warsaw University of Life Sciences. He completed research internships in Heidelberg and at the Faculty of Political Science and Journalism at the University of Warsaw. Since 1978 he was working for Agricultural University in Szczecin. In 1982 he obtained a PhD at the University of Silesia.

In the years 1994-1998 he chaired the Self-Government Assembly of the Szczecin Province. He was a co-founder and the first president of the Euregion Pomerania. From 1995 to 1998, he worked as the editor-in-chief of Przegląd Samorządowy. In 1998 he was elected the first marshal of the West Pomeranian Voivodeship and he was until 2000. From 1 July to 31 December 1999 he was the chairman of the Convent of Marshals of the Voivodeships of the Republic of Poland. In the years 1999-2000 he was the co-chairman of the Polish-German Committee for Cross-Border Cooperation, and until January 2000 – co-chairman of the Government-Self-Government Team for Regional Policy, Spatial Development and Environmental Protection.

From 1995 to 2001 he was a member of the Congress of Local and Regional Authorities of the Council of Europe in Strasbourg. In March 2000, he became an advisor for local government affairs to the President of the Republic of Poland, he held this position until assuming the mandate of a senator.

He belonged to the Polish United Workers' Party and was a member of the Social Democracy of the Republic of Poland. He was a member of the Democratic Left Alliance, and a member of the Provincial Board of that party.

In the Senate, he worked in the following committees: Local Government and State Administration, Foreign Affairs and European Integration and in the Extraordinary Committee of European Legislation.

Zychowicz died in a hospital in Szczecin on January 6, 2016, at the age of 62.

== Honours and decorations ==
=== National honours ===
Ribbon bar	Honour	Date
	Gold Badge of Honor of the West Pomeranian Griffin	5 May 2003
	Badge of Honor for Merits to the Local Government	18 September 2015
