= Richard P. Von Herzen =

American marine geophysicist (1930–2016)

Richard P. Von Herzen (1930–2016) was an Earth scientist at Woods Hole Oceanographic Institution who pioneered studies of heat flowing from the seafloor. He won the 1998 Maurice Ewing Medal. He graduated from California Institute of Technology (BA), Harvard University (MA), and the Scripps Institution of Oceanography (PhD).
