= John Stevens (crime reporter) =

English journalist

- John Stevens at work
- Born: 1929
- Died: January 12, 2016 (aged 86–87)
- Occupation: Crime reporter
- Employer: London Evening Standard
- Known for: Close contacts with Scotland Yard

John Stevens (1929 – 12 January 2016) was a crime reporter for the London Evening Standard who was known for his close contacts with Scotland Yard.
