= Flames over Treasures =

- Poster
- Directed by: Nicolae Mărgineanu
- Produced by: Nicolae Mărgineanu
- Starring: Mircea Albulescu; Claudiu Bleonț; Magda Catone; Remus Margineanu; Imola Gaspar; Valentin Uritescu; Melania Ursu
- Release date: 1988
- Country: Romania
- Language: Romanian

Flames over Treasures (Romanian: Flacăra pe Comori, and also known as Flames on the Treasures), is a 1988 Romanian film produced by Romania Film and directed by Nicolae Mărgineanu from a script by Ion Agârbiceanu from Agârbiceanu's novel "Archangels." It concerns a gold mine in Romania reported to be haunted. It stars Mircea Albulescu, Claudiu Bleonț, Magda Catone, Remus Margineanu, Imola Gaspar, Valentin Uritescu and Melania Ursu.

Flacăra pe Comori won the Prize for Direction at the Romanian National Film Festival, Costinesti, 1987. The film is released in the United States on DVD and VHS by Ager Film, a company dedicated to releasing Romanian films for home video.

== Cast ==
- Mircea Albulescu
- Claudiu Bleont
- Magda Catone
- Viorel Ludușan
- Remus Mărgineanu
- Vasile Nițulescu
- Claudiu Oblea
- Valentin Uritescu
- Melania Ursu
