= Witold Mańczak =

Polish linguist

Witold Mańczak (12 August 1924 – 12 January 2016) was a Polish linguist. He was a member of Polish Academy of Learning and the Polish Academy of Sciences. He is best known for his historical linguistics work on identifying, via statistical methods focusing especially on well-studied European languages, overarching tendencies in analogical change. He has also argued that Gothic is closer to German than to Scandinavian, and suggests Goths originally hailed from somewhere around present day Austria, rather than from Scandinavia."

== Publications ==
- Witold Manczak, The Method of Comparing the Vocabulary in Parallel Texts. Journal of Quantitative Linguistics 10(2): 93–103 (2003)
- Witold Mańczak (1999). Wieża Babel. Wrocław: Zakład Narodowy im. Ossolińskich. ISBN 83-04-04463-3.
- Witold Manczak: "Lingwistyka a Prehistoria". BULLETIN DE LA SOCIÉTÉ POLONAISE DE LINGUISTIQUE, fasc. LV, 1999 ISSN 0032-3802 pdf
- Folia Linguistica Historica, Acta Societatis Linguisticae Europaeae .ISSN 0165-4004 Vol. XXI / 1–2 (2000)
- WM: Criticism of naturalness: Naturalness or frequency of occurrence?
- WM: Damaris Nübling, Prinzipien der Irregularisierung. Ein kontrastive Analyse von zehn Verben in zehn germanischen Sprachen
- WM: O Odcyfrowaniach pism. BULLETIN DE LA SOCIÉTÉ POLONAISE DE LINGUISTIQUE, fasc. LX, 2004, ISSN 0032-3802
- PRAOJCZYZNA SŁOWIAN

== See also ==
- Jerzy Kuryłowicz
