= Joseph Ritz =

American dramatist

Joseph P. Ritz (6 November 1929 – 4 January 2016) was an American journalist and playwright.

== Early life and education ==
Ritz was born in Chicago, Illinois. His natural parents are unknown. He was adopted by Joseph Ritz (originally Rizzi) and his wife, Helen, and raised in Canton, Ohio. He graduated from Catholic grade school and Central Catholic High School there.

He joined the Army in 1948, was stationed in Fort Lewis, Washington, and was deployed to Fort Richardson, Alaska, near Anchorage, after the start of the Korean War.

Ritz had his first newspaper article – a feature story on Army ski exercises – published in The News Tribune of Tacoma, Washington, while he was at Fort Lewis. In Alaska, he joined the Anchorage Writers Club.

Following his discharge, he attended Seattle University and worked as a hopper for The Seattle Times, delivering bundles of newspapers to stores.

After a year, he transferred to Marquette University in Milwaukee, Wisconsin, where he majored in journalism. He was an associate editor of the student magazine the Marquette Journal and worked part-time as a copy boy for the Milwaukee Sentinel when it was a Hearst newspaper. He graduated from Marquette with a bachelor's degree in journalism in February 1955.

== Career ==
Ritz's first job out of college was as a news writer for radio station WFDF in Flint, Michigan. He also was a stringer for the Detroit Times and United Press International. He went on to become a reporter for The Leader Herald in Gloversville, New York; The Journal-Courier in New Haven, Connecticut; and The Evening News in Newburgh, New York.

In the early 1960s, he also was assistant news director for Fordham University in the Bronx, New York.

At The Evening News, he wrote part of a news series entitled "The Road to Integration" that won a 1964 Pulitzer Citation for Public Service for the Gannett group of newspapers.

In 1964, he went to the Buffalo Courier-Express, where he was a reporter, copy editor and editorial writer at different times until the paper went out of business in September 1982. He then was an education, business and labor writer for The Buffalo News. His weekly column on labor unions earned him several awards. He retired in 1993.

In retirement, he continued to write freelance. His articles appeared in The New York Sun, the New York Herald-Tribune, the Daily Express in London, and the National Catholic Reporter.

== Death ==
He died in Hamburg, New York, on 4 January 2016. He was survived by his wife of 57 years, Ann; five children and eight grandchildren.

== Books and plays ==
Ritz wrote the books The Despised Poor: Newburgh's War on Welfare and I Never Looked for My Mother and Other Regrets of a Journalist.

His plays include:

- Copy Desk (performed in Buffalo and Los Angeles)
- Trappists (performed several times in New York City and published in an anthology entitled Incisions – Award Winning Plays from the Stage & Screen Book Club
- The Harvest Years, I.R.S.
- Mark & Livy

== Awards and recognition ==
Prizes for his newspaper articles include:

- New York State Publishers' Award for Community Service
- The New York State AFL-CIO 1986 Award "for outstanding achievements and contributions on behalf of working men and women in the state"
- the American Political Science Association's Award for "Distinguished Reporting of Public Affairs"
- the U.S. Department of Labor Award in 1988 for "outstanding efforts to advance the welfare of American's working men and women".
