= Benjamin F. Shobe =

American judge

Benjamin Franklin Shobe (October 2, 1920 – January 29, 2016) was an American civil rights attorney and jurist who advocated for the desegregation of public education and public facilities in the Commonwealth of Kentucky.

== Early life and education ==
Benjamin F. Shobe was born on October 2, 1920, in Bowling Green, Kentucky, and spent most of his life in Louisville, Kentucky. His parents were both educators. His father, Walter L. Shobe, was the Dean of Men at Kentucky State College and later principal of a high school for blacks. Anna L. Shobe, his mother, was an elementary school teacher who taught Benjamin for a time. Shobe had one older brother, Dr. Walter Shobe.

Benjamin F. Shobe earned a bachelor's degree in 1941 from Kentucky State College (now Kentucky State University), a historically black school in Frankfort. While in college, Shobe, along with his brother Walter, was inducted into the Tau Sigma Honor Society for his academic excellence. Shobe was an active member of the debating team. One of his professors, Dr. Henry E. Cheaney, encouraged him to pursue a career in law.

Shobe wanted to pursue a law degree at a school in Kentucky such as the University of Louisville or the University of Kentucky, but state law prohibited African Americans from attending graduate or professional schools in Kentucky. Under the Anderson-Mayer Bill, the Commonwealth of Kentucky was required to pay tuition and fees for African Americans to attend graduate and professional schools at out-of-state institutions. The state paid the tuition and fees for Shobe to attend the University of Michigan Law School (Ann Arbor campus). While in law school, Shobe was selected for mentorship in the Society of Barristers. He graduated from the University of Michigan with his law degree in 1946 and returned to Louisville, Kentucky to practice as a trial attorney.

== Career ==
After spending three years as an associate in the law firm of Charles Anderson, Shobe began his own practice. As a civil rights attorney for the NAACP, Shobe worked with Thurgood Marshall (who later became the first black US Supreme Court Justice), James Nabritt, and James A. Crumlin to integrate the University of Kentucky in 1949. These attorneys represented Lyman T. Johnson, a black student who could not attend the university's graduate school because he was black. Shobe and his fellow attorneys won the case, Lyman T. Johnson v. University of Kentucky, paving the way for minorities to attend the university's graduate and professional schools.

In 1951, Shobe partnered with attorneys James A. Crumlin and Robert L. Carter to represent plaintiffs in Sweeney v. City of Louisville. Shobe and his team made successful arguments and won the case in the federal courts. As a result of Shobe's work, public parks in Louisville, Kentucky were desegregated.

On January 6, 1953, Judge Frank Ropke appointed Shobe to the Jefferson Circuit Court, making him the first African American to serve as a judge in Kentucky since Reconstruction. Shobe served as a hearing officer for the Workman's Compensation Board, Assistant Commonwealth's Attorney for eight years, and a Trial Commissioner. At the request of the Kentucky Secretary of Justice, Shobe traveled throughout Kentucky training lawyers on the state's criminal code. In 1972, Shobe appointed Olga Peers, who would later become the first female Circuit Court Judge in Kentucky, to the old Louisville Police Court.

In November 1976, Governor Julian Carroll appointed Shobe to serve as the Chief Judge of the 15th Division of the Jefferson Circuit Court. Shobe was the first African American to be appointed as a Chief Judge, serving with honor until his retirement in 1992. For several years after his retirement from the bench, Shobe served as an Alternative Dispute Resolution Specialist for Retired Judges and Associates.

== Civic and religious engagement ==
Shobe served as President of the Louisville Branch of the National Association for the Advancement of Colored People (NAACP). He was a member of Omega Psi Phi fraternity. A life member of the National Urban League, Shobe also joined Ye Olde Esquires, Inc.

Shobe joined Portland Memorial Baptist Church in 1978 where he served as a Deacon and Sunday School teacher.

== Awards and honors ==
In 1992, Shobe was honored by the Louisville Bar Association as Judge of the Year. The Kentucky Commission on Human Rights inducted Shobe into the Gallery of Great Black Kentuckians as its 42nd honoree in 2006. Shobe received the Nathaniel A. Harper Diversity Award from the Kentucky Bar Association in 2012.

== Death ==
Shobe died at the age of 95 on January 29, 2016. Funeral services were held at Portland Memorial Baptist Church on February 8, 2016. He is buried in Cave Hill Cemetery in Louisville, Kentucky.

Hundreds of people gathered to celebrate Shobe's life at his funeral. Ministers and community leaders spoke highly of Shobe's love of God and his family as well as his commitment to serving others. Attorneys and judges from across Kentucky paid tribute to Shobe for his kindness, integrity, and brilliance. Chief Justice John D. Minton of the Kentucky Supreme Court lauded Shobe's character and accomplishments. A letter honoring Shobe from US President Barack Obama was read. The American Flag at the US Capitol in Washington, DC, was flown at half-mast in honor of Shobe on the day of his funeral.

== Legacy ==
In 2006, the Louisville Bar Association and the Louis D. Brandeis American Inns of Court at Louisville Association developed the Judge Shobe Civility and Professionalism Award to recognize Louisville Bar Association members "whose lives and careers embody professionalism, civility, honesty and courtesy" – all trademarks portrayed by Shobe throughout his career, association officials said. About his life, [Shobe] says, "I was always willing to try, I was never going to back down, I was willing to take the challenge, win, lose, or draw."

In 2012, the Louisville Black Lawyers Association and the Kentucky Court of Justice sponsored the dedication of the Circuit Judge Benjamin F. Shobe Jury Assembly Room in the Jefferson County Judicial Center. The Kentucky Bar Association will honor Shobe posthumously at its 2016 Annual Convention.

Shobe mentored attorneys and judges throughout his life. For years after his retirement, colleagues visited and consulted him for advice and support. In a joint resolution, the Kentucky state legislature honored the memory of the late jurist by designating the I-264 overpass over Northwestern Parkway in Jefferson County as the "Judge Benjamin Shobe Memorial Overpass" in 2017. Judge Shobe is survived by his wife of 43 years, Barbara Kirby-Shobe, his ten children, one adopted son, grandchildren, and great-grandchildren.

== Sources ==
- A.D. Porter and Sons Obituary for Judge Benjamin Shobe
- Kentucky Commission on Human Rights
- Michigan Law Student Profile: Benjamin F. Shobe
