= Agapito Robleda Castro =

Honduran politician

Agapito Robleda Castro (d. January 5, 2016) was a Honduran politician. His nom de guerre during his underground years was 'Renato Pereira'.

Robleda Castro was born a peasant family in El Progreso, Yoro on March 30, 1932. At the age of 16 he began to work at the Tela Railroad Company. He became a member of the Honduran Democratic Revolutionary Party (PDRH). He joined a Marxist study group in La Ceiba, together with other PDRH members, in 1952.

Robleda Castro was one of the co-founders of the Communist Party of Honduras in 1954. He was a member of the politburo of PCH. An active labour organizer, he took part in the banana workers struggle the same year. He served as editor of the communist newspaper Tribuna Revolucionaria ('Revolutionary Tribune').

Between the 1960s and 1980s he was active in the Sitraterco (Sindicato de Trabajadores de la Tela Rail Road Company) union.

The third plenum of the PCH Central Committee, held in Mexico in 1965, decided that returnees from political education abroad like Robleda Castro would be charged with organizing the party inside Honduras. Inside the PCH Central Committee Robleda Castro had argued in favour of organizing guerrilla struggle.

In 1967 Robeleda Castro broke with PCH and founded the Marxist-Leninist Communist Party of Honduras (PCMLH) in San Pedro Sula.

He died in San Pedro Sula on January 5, 2016.
