= Mikhail Odnoralov =

Russian painter (1944–2016)

- Михаи́л Никола́евич Однора́лов
- Born: Mikhail Nikolayevich Levidov; 10 November 1944; Moscow, Soviet Union
- Died: 22 January 2016 (aged 71); New York City, US
- Education: Robert Falk private studio; Moscow Art School at Krasnaya Presnya; Russian State University for the Humanities
- Known for: Painter and curator
- Movement: Expressionism, Surrealism

Mikhail Nikolayevich Odnoralov (born Levidov, Russian: Михаи́л Никола́евич Однора́лов; 10 November 1944 – 22 January 2016) was a Russian nonconformist artist who was well known in Moscow in the 1970s. He spent the second half of his life in New York City.

== Biography ==
In 1957, Odnoralov received early art lessons at Robert Falk's private studio, and from 1958 to 1960, he attended art school in Krasnaya Presnya, Moscow.

Odnoralov took part in the second Russian avant-garde movement. However, he was also a member of the USSR Union of Artists and showed his paintings at official exhibitions. From 1966 to 1979, his paintings were frequently exhibited at the Union of Moscow Artists.

His art studio was sometimes a gathering site for underground artists to plan their next collective show or to discuss one another's work, and he was briefly detained for his role in the Bulldozer Exhibition in 1974. A couple weeks after his release, his paintings were displayed before crowds in Izmaylovsky Park.

The Soviet regime was suspicious of Odnoralov not mainly for the content of his paintings (although the Communist authorities did not like the icons depicted in his works, which clearly reflected Russian religious philosophy), but for his uncensored social activity. The KGB urged his neighbors to file complaints claiming that the guests at his studio disturbed them.

In 1980, Odnoralov emigrated from the USSR. He lived and worked on the Lower East Side of Manhattan. He died on 22 January 2016 in New York City.

== Selected exhibitions ==
- May 1961: Summer Theatre, Tarusa, Kaluzhskaya Oblast. Joint exhibition with other Moscow artists such as Igor Vulokh, Mai Miturich-Khlebnikov, Eduard Steinberg and Boris Sveshnikov.
- 29 September 1974: II Autumn Open-Air Art Exhibition, Izmaylovsky Park.
- 20–30 September 1975: VDNKh, Culture Pavilion.
- 1983: "Unofficial Art from the Soviet Union", Capitol Hill, Washington, D.C.
- 1987: "Retrospection 1957–1987", State Exhibition Hall Gallery Belyaevo, Moscow.
- 1988: "Russian Still Life", Museum of Russian Art, Jersey City.
- 1997: "Alice from the Lower East Side", Lehman College Art Gallery, New York City. Solo exhibition.
- 2003: "Memories: Russian Postmodern Nostalgia", Yeshiva University Museum, New York City.
- 5–28 February 2010: "Retrospection", Tretyakov Gallery, Moscow. Solo exhibition.
- 6 June–12 July 2010: Russian Museum, Saint Petersburg. Solo exhibition.

== Museum collections ==
- Tretyakov Gallery (Moscow, Russia)
- Russian Museum (Saint Petersburg, Russia)
- Nasher Museum of Art, Duke University (Durham, North Carolina)
- Zimmerli Art Museum at Rutgers University (New Brunswick, New Jersey)
- Hofstra University Museum (Hempstead, New York)
- Museum of Contemporary Russian Art in Exile (Montgeron, France)
