= Addepalli Ramamohana Rao =

Indian poet and literary critic

- Born: 6 September 1936; Chintalaguntapalem, Machilipatnam, Krishna district, Andhra Pradesh
- Died: 14 January 2016 (aged 79); Kakinada, Andhra Pradesh
- Occupations: poet, literary critic

Addepalli Ramamohana Rao was a noted Telugu poet and literary critic from India.

== Early life ==
He was born in Chintalaguntapalem village in Machilipatnam of Andhra Pradesh, India, on 6 September 1936.

== Works ==
He penned 13 compilations of poetry, 25 books on literary criticism and 600 books on various genres.

== Awards ==
- Praja Kavi
