= Oscar Fritschi =

Swiss politician (1939–2016)

Oscar Fritschi

Oscar Fritschi (25 February 1939 – 8 January 2016) was a Swiss politician (FDP).

== Biography ==
Fritschi was born on 25 February 1939 in Winterthur, Switzerland. He grew up as the son of a liberal Superintendent of the textile industry. He completed a history degree at the University of Zurich and received a doctorate. He subsequently worked as a high school teacher and wrote reports of party meetings for the Neue Zürcher Zeitung (NZZ).

In 1965, Fritschi was appointed by the then cantonal party president and editor of the NZZ Ernst Bieri to party secretary for the canton and city of Zürich. In 1972, Fritschi became editor in chief for the Zürcher Oberland.

From 1986 to 1992, Fritschi was president of the FDP of the canton of Zürich. From 1991 to 1992, he was a member of the Cantonal Council of the Canton of Zürich. On November 25, 1991, he was in the National Assembly elected and had there a seat in the Security Policy, the Political Institutions and the Drafting Committee. In the 1999 parliamentary elections, he no longer had support, and therefore resigned December 5, 1999, the Grand Chamber of. After that, he was president of the European Conference on Human Rights and self-determination.

Fritschi retired in 2004, but remained Chairman of the Board of the scoreboard of Uster, and worked for the Journal of Zürcher Oberland. He was also appointed to the board of the FDP of the district Hinwil and president of the Foundation for Archaeology and Cultural History in Canton of Zürich.

In the Swiss army, Fritschi was a Colonel. He never married.

Fritschi died on 8 January 2016, following a short stay in a hospital.
