= Mondli Cele =

South African soccer player (1989–2016)

Personal information
- Full name: Mondli Cele
- Date of birth: 19 March 1989
- Place of birth: Durban, South Africa
- Date of death: 17 January 2016 (aged 26)
- Place of death: Pietermaritzburg, South Africa
- Height: 1.73 m (5 ft 8 in)
- Position: Midfielder

Senior career*
Years	Team	Apps	(Gls)
2012–2014	Gamalakhe United		
2014–2016	Maritzburg United	37	(5)
- * Club domestic league appearances and goals

Mondli Cele (19 March 1989 – 17 January 2016) was a South African soccer player who played as a midfielder. He played his career only in South Africa, and died in a car accident near Pietermaritzburg.

== Club career ==
=== Gamalakhe United ===
Born in Durban, South Africa, Cele joined Port Shepstone-based second division club Gamalakhe United in 2012.

=== Maritzburg United ===
Cele caught the eye of Maritzburg United coach, Steve Komphela, after impressing in a Nedbank Cup match against Engen Santos. In August 2014, he joined Maritzburg United.

== International career ==
Cele was included in the preliminary South Africa squad for the 2015 Africa Cup of Nations, but did not make the final 23. Maritzburg United captain Ashley Hartog said Cele's call-up, along with Kwanda Mngonyama, inspired their teammates.

== Death ==
Cele died on Sunday, 17 January 2016, when a car he was in plunged into the Msunduzi River near Pietermaritzburg. He had scored for Maritzburg United during their match against Orlando Pirates earlier on that day. After his death, tributes to him were paid, including Minister of Sport Fikile Mbalula saying it should serve as a reminder to fight road carnage in South Africa, the Premier Soccer League observing a moment of silence at all the Sunday's matches, Ghanaian former international player John Paintsil, and Kurt Lentjies revealing that Maritzburg United had dedicated their 2015–16 Premier Soccer League season to him.
