= Yevgeny Kotlov =

Soviet ice hockey player

Personal information
- Born: 16 December 1949 Chelyabinsk, Russia
- Died: 11 January 2016 (aged 66) Moscow, Russia

Sport
- Sport: Ice hockey
- Club: Traktor Chelyabinsk (1967–70); HC Dynamo Moscow (1970–79)

Yevgeny Nikolayevich Kotlov (Russian: Евгений Николаевич Котлов; 16 December 1949 – 11 January 2016) was a Soviet hockey player.

His hockey career began in 1963. Known for his performances in clubs Traktor Chelyabinsk (1967–70) and HC Dynamo Moscow (1970–79). He played for the youth team of the USSR and the second. At the end of his playing career, working children and youth coach. He died in Moscow in 2016.
