= David Craighead (politician) =

Romanian-American politician

Member of the Oklahoma House of Representatives from the 95th district
- In office 1973–1989
- Preceded by: A. J. Clemons
- Succeeded by: Jim Isaac

Personal details
- Born: March 8, 1931 Galați, Romania
- Died: January 19, 2016 (aged 84)
- Party: Democratic
- Spouse: Betty Craighead
- Children: 2
- Education: Baylor University

David Craighead (March 8, 1931 – January 19, 2016) was a Romanian-American politician. He served as a Democratic member for the 95th district of the Oklahoma House of Representatives.

== Life and career ==
Craighead was born in Galați in Romania. He attended Baylor University.

Craighead served in the army during the Korean conflict. He was a columnist and newspaper reporter for newspapers in Oklahoma and Texas.

In 1973, Craighead was elected to represent the 95th district of the Oklahoma House of Representatives, succeeding A. J. Clemons. He served until 1989, when he was succeeded by Jim Isaac.

Craighead died in January 2016, at the age of 84.
