= E. John Lownes III =

American politician

Member of the New Hampshire House of Representatives from the Grafton 8th district
- In office 1978–1980

Personal details
- Born: April 18, 1927 Providence, Rhode Island, U.S.
- Died: January 11, 2016 (aged 88)
- Party: Republican

E. John Lownes III (April 18, 1927 – January 11, 2016) was an American politician. He served as a Republican member for the Grafton 8th district of the New Hampshire House of Representatives.
