= Dick Spady =

American businessman

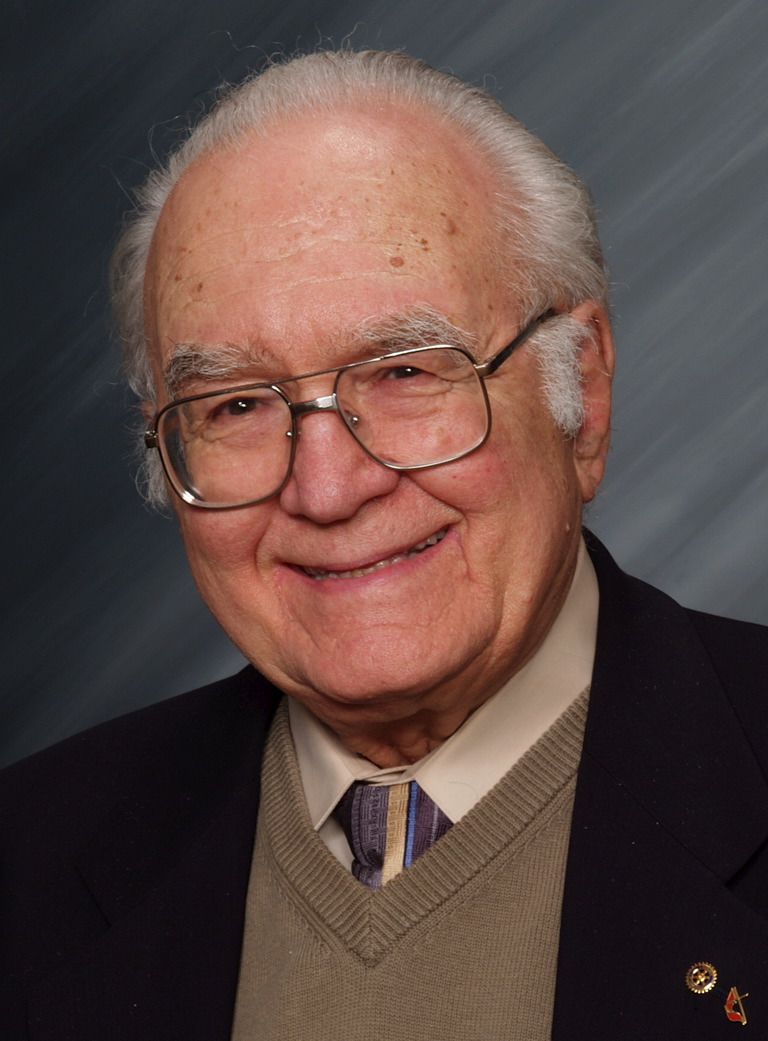
- Born: October 15, 1923
- Died: January 10, 2016 (aged 92)
- Education: Oregon State University
- Occupation: Businessman
- Known for: Founder of Dick's Drive-In

Richard Jack Spady (October 15, 1923 – January 10, 2016) was an American businessman best known as the co-founder and namesake of Dick's Drive-In, a chain of fast food restaurants local to Seattle, Washington. Born in Portland, Oregon, he served military service in World War II and the Korean War. Inspired by a restaurant selling hamburgers, he made the decision to open his own drive-in. With the help of two partners whose shares he later bought out, Spady opened the first Dick's Drive-In in Wallingford in 1954.

== Life and career ==
Spady was born in Portland, Oregon, on October 15, 1923. After graduating from Grant High School, he joined the United States Navy as a Seabee during World War II in 1943. A stint at Pearl Harbor was where he met his future business partner, H. Warren Ghormley. When the war ended, and with the assistance of the G.I. Bill, Spady attended Oregon State University and graduated in 1950. He then additionally served three more years in the Korean War as a commissary officer at Itazuke Air Base (now Fukuoka Airport).

After returning home from service in 1953, Spady was searching for potential business opportunities. While working as a commercial real estate agent, he visited a local restaurant. After seeing a stack of hamburger patties in their refrigerator and inquiring, Spady learned that the restaurant went through multiple stacks of patties per day. While going into the restaurant business was risky, Spady was nonetheless inspired, stating, "I figured I could survive long enough to get into something respectable, like real estate." He contacted Ghormley, who was living in Seattle, and the two agreed to become business partners. They also convinced Ghormley's wife's boss, Dr. B. O. A. Thomas, to join the business.

After traveling to California to study hamburger restaurants like McDonald's, Spady moved to Seattle to open his first restaurant. The first Dick's Drive-In opened on January 28, 1954, on 45th Avenue NE in Wallingford, celebrating its grand opening on February 20. Throughout Spady's tenure, Dick's added five more locations. He also worked to ensure that the restaurant employees were paid above minimum wage and received multiple benefits. In 1991, Spady bought out the other business partners. Following Spady's retirement, his son Jim later took over the presidency of Dick's Drive-In.

== Personal life ==
Spady met Ina Lou Arnold shortly after the opening of the first Dick's restaurant. They later married on August 5, 1955, and had five children together.

On January 10, 2016, Spady died of natural causes in Seattle.
