= Seattle Public Utilities =

Government agency of Seattle, Washington, US

Agency overview
- Formed: 1997
- Preceding agency: Seattle Engineering and Water Departments
- Type: Public utility
- Jurisdiction: City of Seattle and some outlying communities
- Headquarters: Municipal Tower, 700 Fifth Avenue, Seattle, Washington, United States; 47°36′18.36″N 122°19′47.28″W
- Annual budget: $809 million USD (2013)
- Agency executive: Andrew Lee, General Manager/CEO
- Website: https://www.seattle.gov/utilities

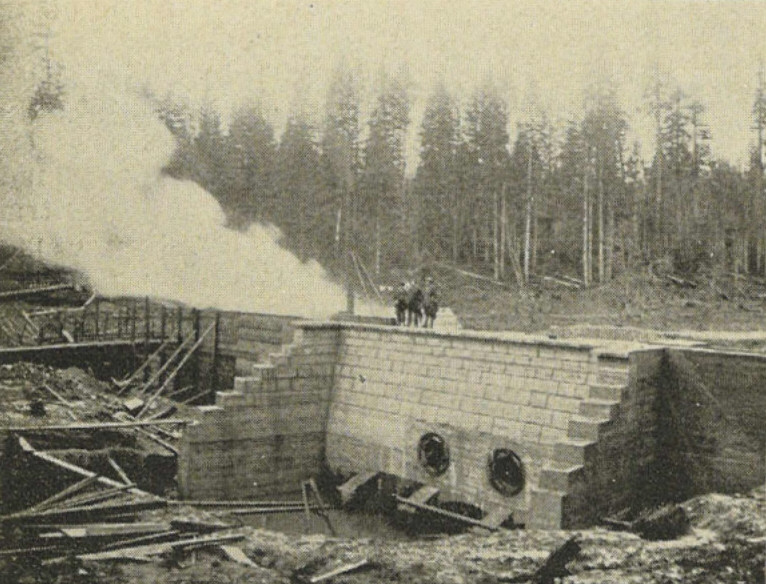
Water supply intake and wing dam under construction, 1900.

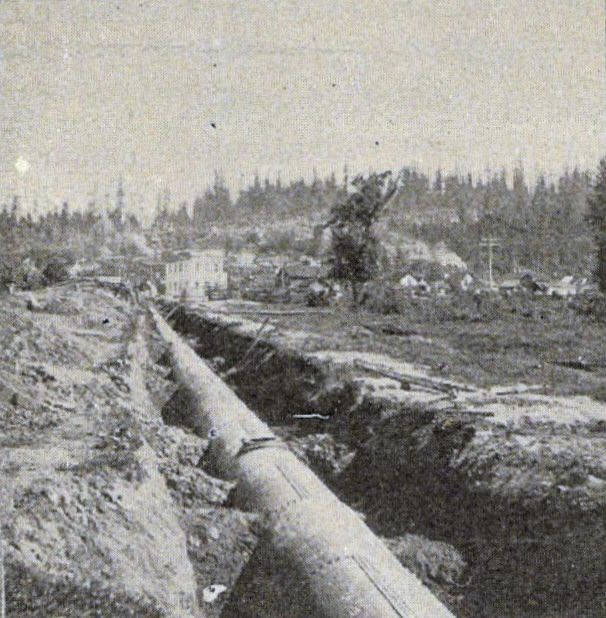
Pipe near Renton, Washington to bring Cedar River water to Seattle; this 1900 picture shows pipe newly laid.

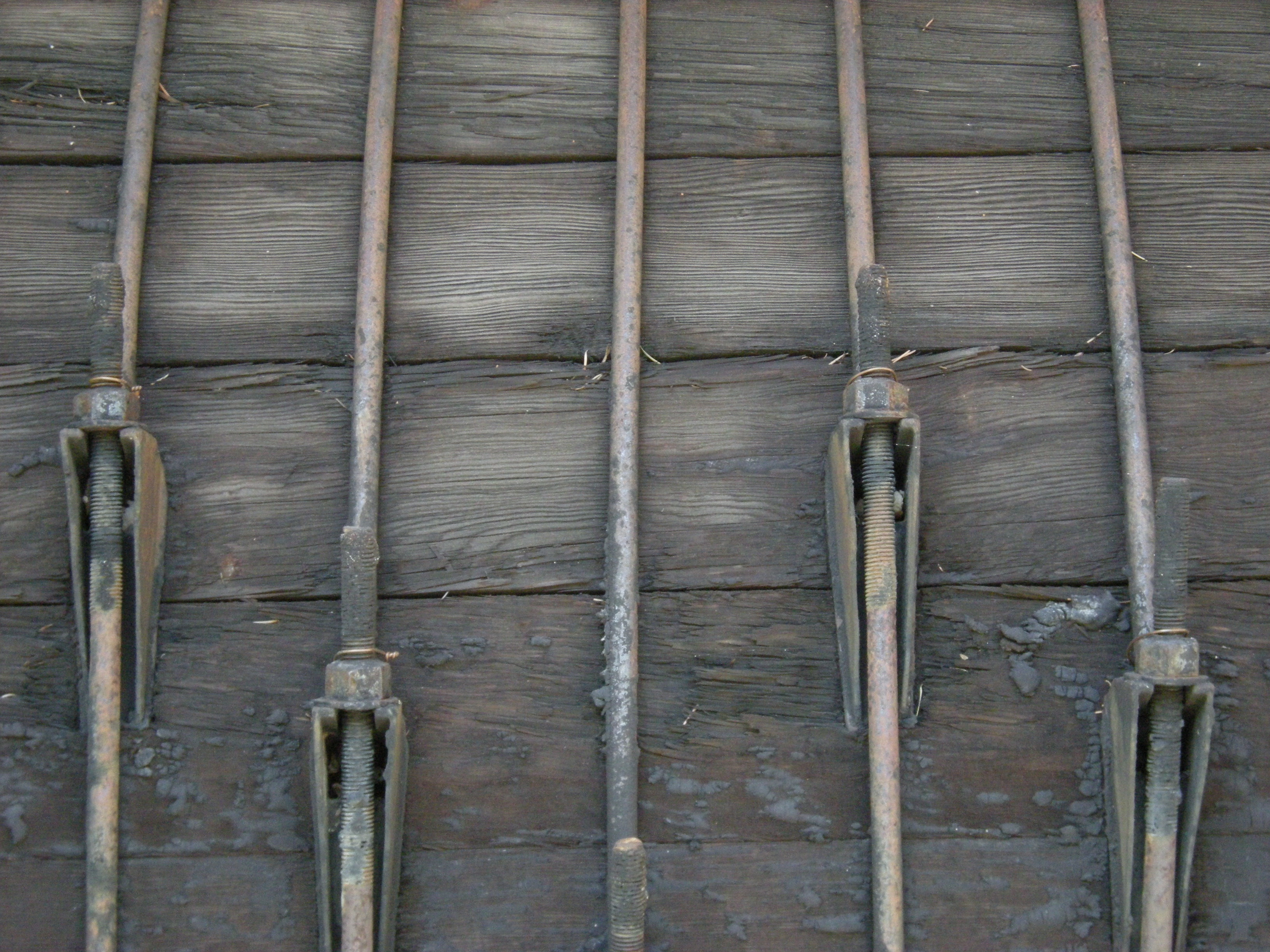
Closeup view of a section of the wooden pipe that brought Cedar River water to Seattle from 1930 to 1991. Metal bands hold the pipe together. This section is now on display in Maple Valley, Washington.

Seattle Public Utilities (SPU) is a public utility agency of the city of Seattle, Washington, which provides water, sewer, drainage and garbage services for 1.3 million people in King County, Washington. The agency was established in 1997, consolidating the city's Water Department with other city functions.

== Water supply ==
SPU owns two water collection facilities in the Cascade Mountains that supply drinking water used by 1.6 million people in Seattle and surrounding suburbs in 2023. The Cedar River watershed comprises 60 percent of the normal supply, and the Tolt River watershed supplies the remaining 40 percent (primarily north of Green Lake). The Cedar River supply is unfiltered, while the Tolt River is filtered and relied upon more heavily during dry years.

From the city's founding through the 1880s, Seattle's water was provided by several private companies. In a July 8, 1889, election, barely a month after the Great Seattle Fire (June 6, 1889) gave a dramatic illustration of the limitations of the city's water supply, Seattle's citizens voted 1,875 to 51 to acquire and operate their own water system. In accordance with this vote, the city Water Department acquired the Lake Union and Spring Hill plants for $400,000.

This was understood from the first to be only a temporary expedient, inadequate to the expected growth of the city. Attention soon focused on the Cedar River, an idea first proposed in the 1870s; the question was how to bring that water to the city. From 1892, the responsibility for doing so fell to newly hired City Engineer Reginald H. Thomson and his assistant George F. Cotterill. Besides the technical challenges, they and a series of Seattle mayors had to keep the citizenry on board to move forward with this expensive project through the Panic of 1893.

The Klondike Gold Rush put Seattle on a sound economic footing. The 1901 completion of Cedar River Supply System No. 1 (active from February 21, 1901) gave the city a steady supply of clean water with an intake 28 miles (45 km) from the city itself; this was supplemented by Cedar River Supply System No. 2 in 1909. Together, these systems gave the city a supply of more than 60,000,000 US gallons (227,125 kl) of water a day.

The original Cedar River pipeline was made of reinforced wooden pipe "big enough so a small boy could stand upright in it" and carried 22,500,000 US gallons (85,172 kl) of water a day. By 1950, three big mains carried up to 162,000,000 US gallons (613,237 kl) of water a day.

To guard against contamination at the source, the city purchased or otherwise gained control of 142 square miles (370 km^{2}) of land and placed it under the jurisdiction of the Department of Health and Sanitation. The city also established an extensive system of reservoirs within city limits. By 1919, six reservoirs had a combined capacity of 270,000,000 US gallons (1,022,061 kl). In 1950, the city owned "about two-thirds" of the watershed, the federal government "about one-fourth"; the remainder, "around eleven square miles," was owned by private lumber companies.

Seattle has at times contracted to provide water for entities outside of city limits. By 2007, it provided water to 19 municipalities and water districts in King County.

In recent decades, the Seattle Regional Water System has significantly improved conservation. 2008 usage was roughly equal to usage in 1960, despite roughly a 35% increase in population over that period. From 1990 to 2012 total water usage declined 29%, despite a population increase of 17%.

== Waste ==
SPU operates two waste sorting facilities: the North Transfer Station in Wallingford and the South Transfer Station in South Park. Both facilities were opened in the 1960s and rebuilt in the 2010s to handle greater volumes and include environmentally friendly features. Garbage from Seattle is shipped out via train to the Columbia Ridge Landfill near Arlington, Oregon.

== See also ==
- Utilities of Seattle
- Government and politics of Seattle
