= North Transfer Station =

Waste transfer station in Seattle, Washington, United States

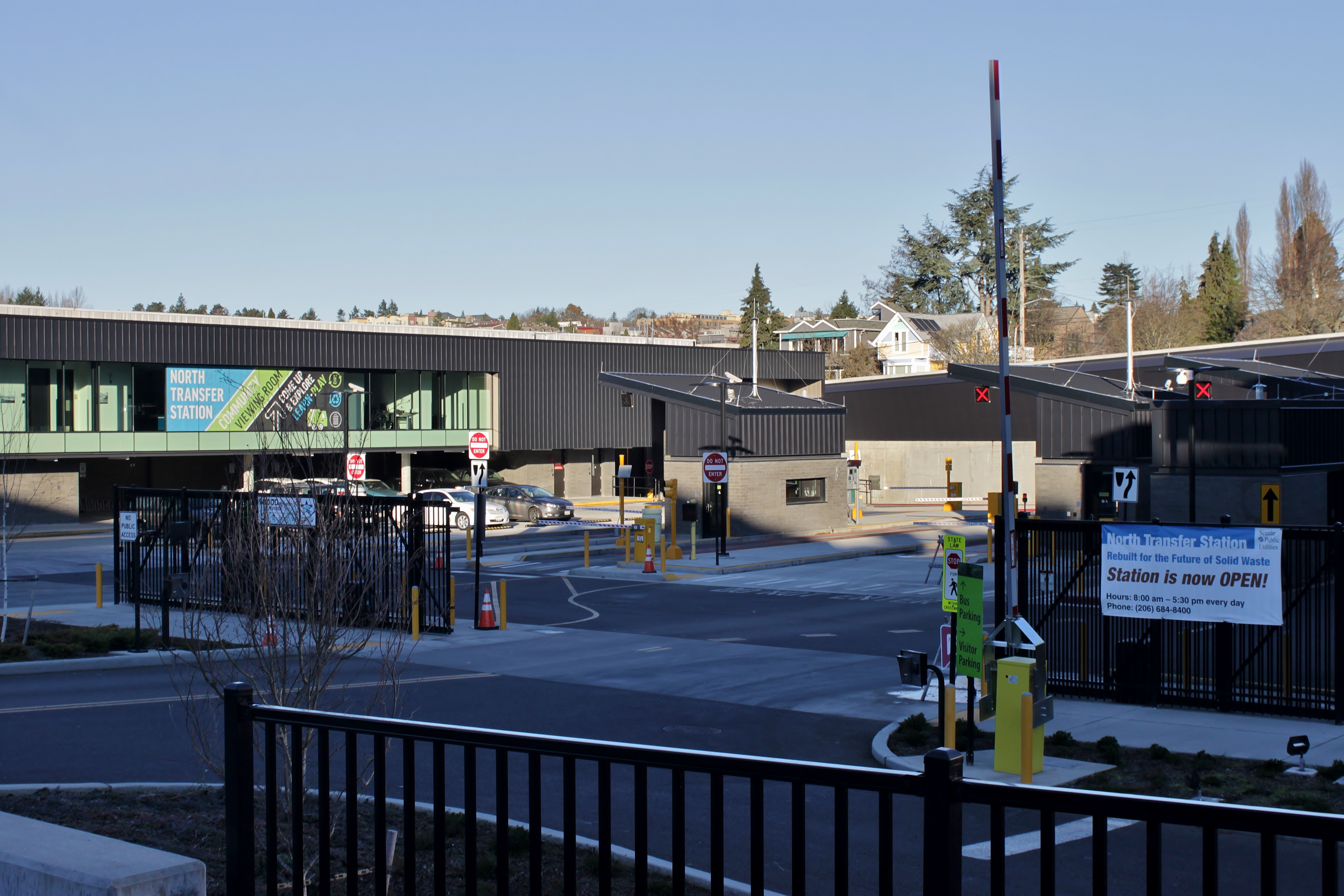
- Main entrance at North 34th Street
- Interactive map of the North Transfer Station area
- Alternative names: North Recycling and Disposal Station

General information
- Status: Operational
- Type: Waste transfer station
- Location: 1350 North 34th Street; Seattle, Washington, U.S.
- Coordinates: 47°38′55″N 122°20′26″W
- Opened: January 2, 1968
- Renovated: 2014–2016
- Renovation cost: $108 million
- Owner: Seattle Public Utilities

Technical details
- Floor count: 2
- Floor area: 163,600 sq ft (15,200 m^{2})
- Grounds: 217,800 sq ft (20,230 m^{2})

Renovating team
- Renovating firm: Mahlum Architects
- Main contractor: Lydig Construction

The North Transfer Station, also known as the North Recycling and Disposal Station, is a municipal waste collection and distribution facility in Seattle, Washington, United States. It is located in the Wallingford neighborhood near Gas Works Park and is one of two transfer stations managed by Seattle Public Utilities.

The original facility opened in 1968 at the site of a former city stable and garage as part of a new plan to haul garbage from Seattle to the Cedar Hills Regional Landfill rather than use local dumps. In the early 2000s, the city government proposed building a modern transfer station on the site, which was approved by Seattle Public Utilities in 2011. The old facility was closed in January 2014 and replaced by a new transfer station that opened in November 2016. It includes a community center with a viewing room, public art, green architecture, and an outdoor playground.

== History ==
The Seattle city government approved construction of its first set of waste transfer stations in 1966, following the closure of several in-city landfills and an agreement to haul garbage to the Cedar Hills Regional Landfill near Kent. The stations were placed in South Park and east of Fremont, the latter on a 4.5-acre (1.8 ha) site that was already used for city maintenance shops that would be relocated to other lots. The South Park facility opened in August 1966, while development of the Fremont facility was delayed by an unsuccessful proposal to add a rooftop tennis court.

Plans for the North Transfer Station were approved in December 1966, consisting of a 120-by-240-foot (37 by 73 m) building that would replace the landfill on Union Bay. Residents of nearby Wallingford submitted a petition to the city council to prevent the construction of the transfer station, but were turned away. On-site construction began in May 1967 with the demolition of the Edgewater Stables, which housed workhorses for the city's maintenance departments and later their replacement vehicles.

The North Transfer Station was dedicated and opened on January 2, 1968, costing $700,000 to construct (equivalent to $4.81 million in 2024 dollars). It was limited to operating during daylight hours and only levied a charge on commercial trucks and vehicles with trailers. The facility began accepting recycled materials without charge shortly after it opened, spearheaded by a Boy Scouts initiative to collect glass for recycling. The facility was repeatedly criticized for its lack of safety barriers separating people from the compactor pit, the noise generated by trucks and various machines, and unpleasant odors that permeated towards nearby residential areas, prompting Wallingford residents to petition city hall for stronger smell controls. The North Transfer Station site was later proposed as the location of a household hazardous waste collection facility, but the lack of suitable land moved the proposed collection facility to Haller Lake.

=== Replacement ===
The Seattle city government adopted new waste management regulations in 1998, including plans to renovate the existing transfer facilities after they had surpassed their designed lifespan. A separate solid waste facilities master plan was published in 2003 and proposed modest expansion of the North Transfer Station, along with other modernization measures. Earlier drafts of the plan had proposed closing the North facility and replacing it with a new intermodal transfer and export center in Interbay, but the use conflicted with existing and planned development in the area.

In 2005, the Seattle City Council approved a $30 million plan to demolish and rebuild the North Transfer Facility, which would expand by 1.5 acres (0.61 ha) that was acquired through the condemnation of an Oroweat bakery building and a street vacation. The facilities master plan also included the construction of a new facility in Georgetown that was scrapped in 2007 in favor of expanding the existing transfer stations to accommodate recycling and other types of waste. The community councils of Fremont and Wallingford appealed the project's environmental studies, stating that the city had not exhausted other alternatives to expanding the North Transfer Station, and the city formed a stakeholder advisory group to address their concerns.

The $52 million renovation project was approved in 2011 by Seattle Public Utilities following consultations from the local community and would be funded by a rate increase for garbage disposal services. The old transfer station was closed on January 20, 2014, requiring users to use the re-opened South Transfer Station in South Park or the county-run transfer station in Shoreline. The old transfer station was demolished by the end of the year and construction on the new building began in July 2014, with steel supports for the new building installed in late 2015. The outdoor public, public artwork, and other community amenities were installed by March 2016. Work continued inside the buildings to install electrical and HVAC systems. The renovated transfer facility opened on November 28, 2016, at a cost of $108 million. The project's cost rose during construction because of unexpected environmental remediation. The donation center and community education and viewing room were opened in February 2018.

== Facilities and design ==
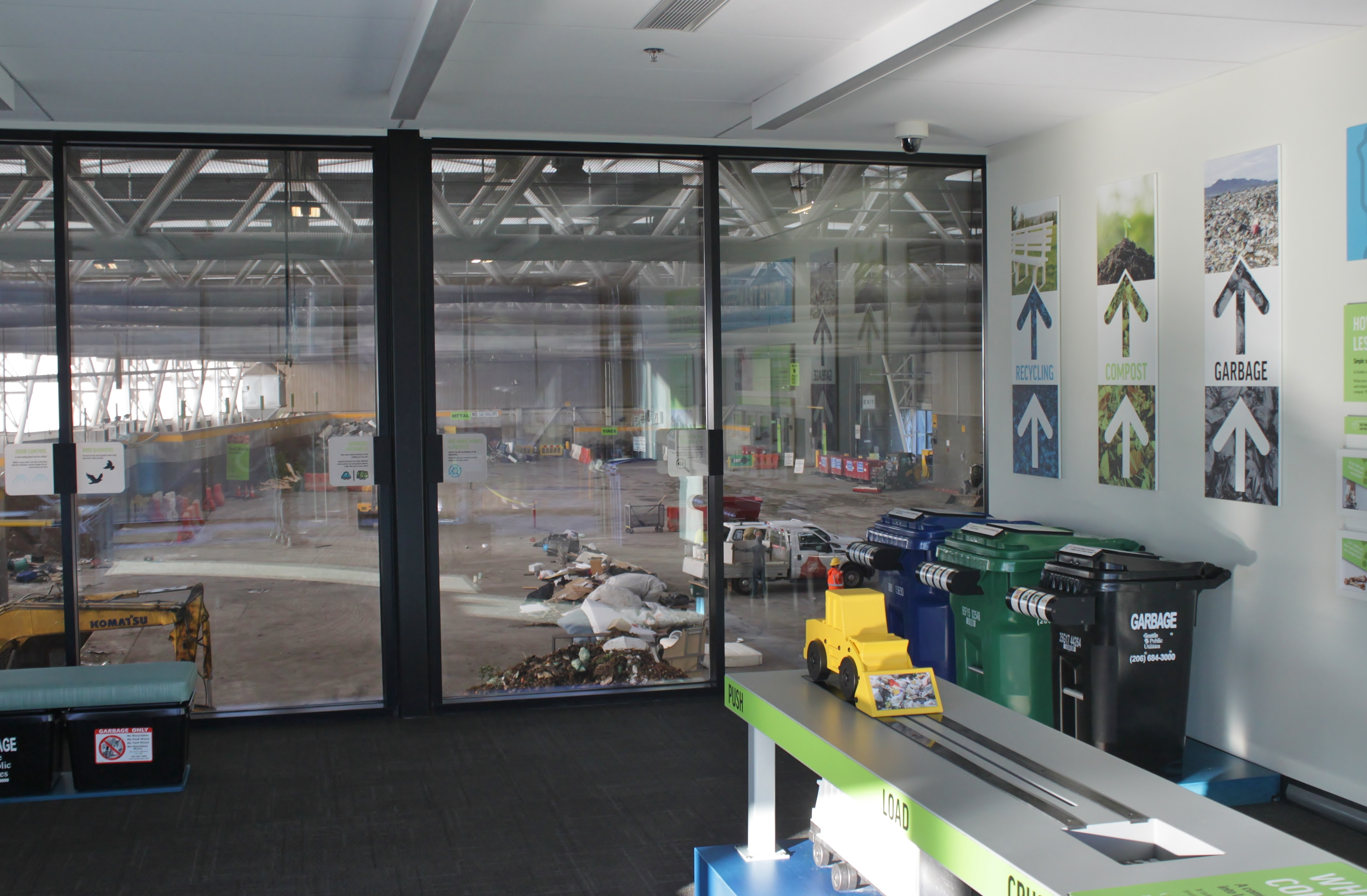
The North Transfer Station's education and viewing room, which overlooks the tipping floor

The North Transfer Station is located on a 5-acre (2.0 ha) site in southern Wallingford near Gas Works Park and the Burke-Gilman Trail on the north side of Lake Union. The sloped campus includes a main building for waste processing, an administration office, and a separate facility for reuse and recycling. Its main entrance is on North 34th Street, which has a set of five scales and queuing space for up to 50 vehicles. The main building on the site is two stories and has 65,000 square feet (6,000 m^{2}) of floor space, with a tipping floor and underground compactors that feed into transport trailers. It was designed by Mahlum Architects with environmentally friendly features, including a green roof, skylights, rooftop solar panels, improved ventilation, and on-site stormwater treatment. The main building's roof was sunk below the northern street level using a series of tri-chorded steel trusses that would allow for an open tipping floor. The waste facility and adjoining reuse and recycle building can handle up to 750 short tons (680 t) of materials per day.

The main building also has an education and viewing room on the second floor that overlooks the tipping floor. It includes scale models of vehicles used at the transfer station, historic photos of garbage collection, and exhibits on recycling and composting. The education center was named in 2011 for J. P. Patches, a local television clown who was known as the "Mayor of the City Dump". The east side of the transfer station facing Woodlawn Avenue North has a small park with a playground, basketball court, seating areas, and exercise equipment. The main building has a public plaza with an outdoor sculpture, "Reclaimed" by Jean Shin, that uses 10,000 feet (3,000 m) of salvaged steel rebar from the original facility to depict the topography of the site before the 1960s.

The design of the facility has been praised by critics for its environmentally-friendly features and public amenities that are not commonly found at waste facilities. It received LEED Gold certification and was awarded a 2019 COTE Top Ten Award from the American Institute of Architects in 2019. The roof truss system was recognized with a national technical award from the American Institute of Steel Construction in 2018.
