= Steam heating (disambiguation) =

Steam heating usually means steam heating as a type of central heating system.

For related articles on Steam heating see:

- District heating
- Geothermal heating
- Seattle Steam Company
- Steam generator (railroad)

== See also ==
- Steam Heat, a show tune song
