= Home of the Good Shepherd =

- U.S. National Register of Historic Places
- Seattle Landmark
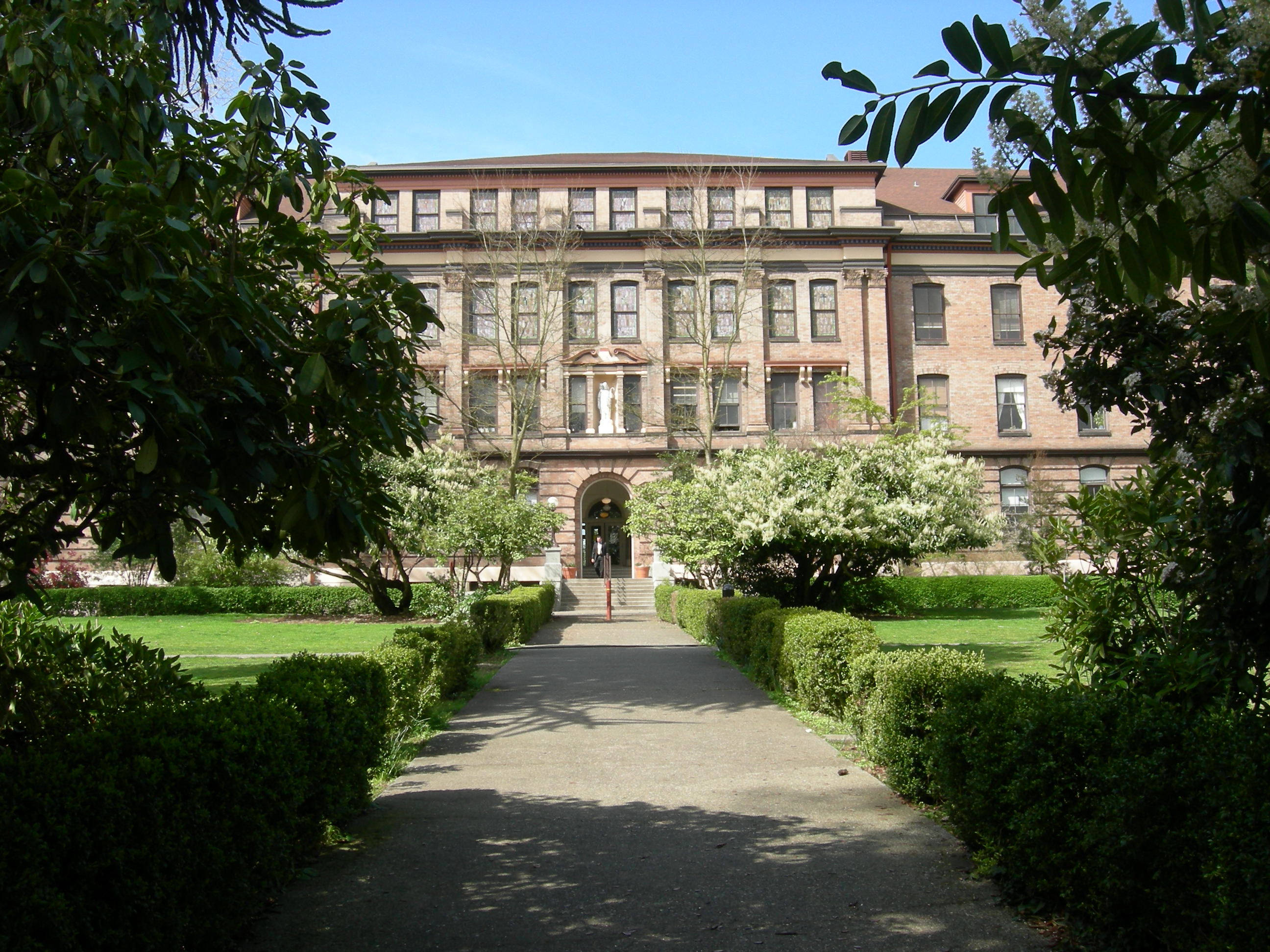
- The park and front entrance to Good Shepherd Center

- Location within Washington (state)
- Location: Sunnyside, N. and 50th St., Seattle, Washington
- Coordinates: 47°39′51″N 122°19′51″W
- Built: 1906
- Architectural style: Classical Revival
- NRHP reference No.: 78002753

Significant dates
- Added to NRHP: May 23, 1978
- Designated SEATL: September 10, 1984

Meridian Playground (also known as Meridian Park) is in the Wallingford neighborhood of Seattle, Washington, United States.

The site features a building called the Good Shepherd Center, which is listed on the National Register of Historic Places as the Home of the Good Shepherd and is a city of Seattle designated landmark. The center was built in 1906 as a Catholic School for wayward girls and operated until 1973. The building is now run by Historic Seattle, while the remainder of the site is run by Seattle Parks and Recreation.

The building includes space for the Wallingford Community Senior Center, Meridian School, Tilth Alliance, community organizations, and low cost housing for artists. The old chapel in the center of the top two floors has been converted into a performance space that features experimental performances organized through the Wayward Music Series.

The gardens and the apple orchard of the old school largely remain. The pool has been filled in and converted into a garden, and the bath house has been converted into a picnic shelter. Amid the orchard are a playground and two playfields, and to the south side is a demonstration garden operated by Tilth Alliance, and a P-Patch community garden. Community involvement with the site occurs through the Good Shepherd Center Advisory Board.

The playground at the site was revamped in 1998 and then upgraded in 2007, both times with matching grants through the city. The sculptures at the back of the playground are based on children's book characters and the two sculptures at the entry are designed to recall past use of the Home of the Good Shepherd, with a nun in front of the GSC and a school girl picking an apple. There is also a niche sculpture of Jesus as the Good Shepherd over the front entrance to the Center. The play equipment includes a water run (now shut down), swings, and some spinning Kompan play structures for older children.
