= Utilities of Seattle =

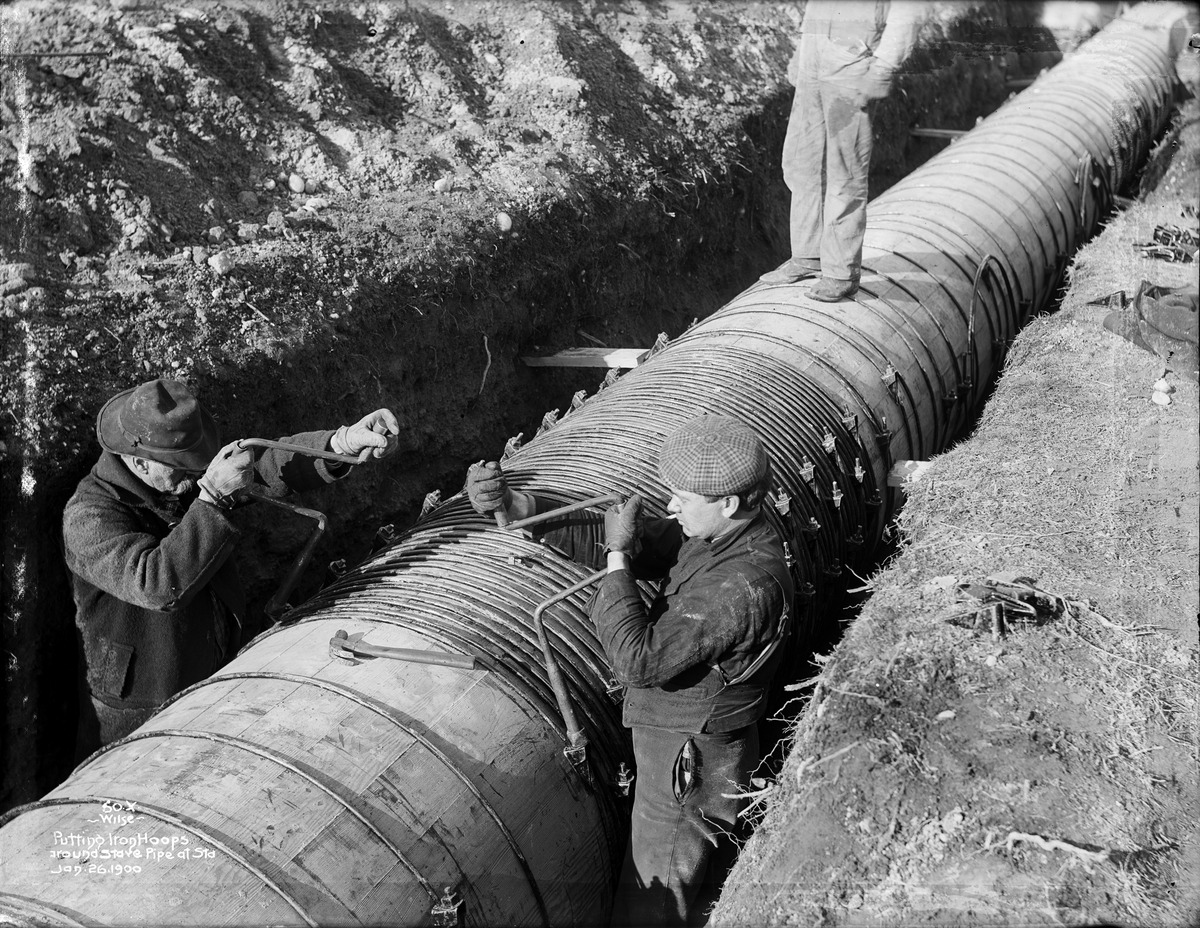
Laying pipe to bring water from the Cedar River in 1900

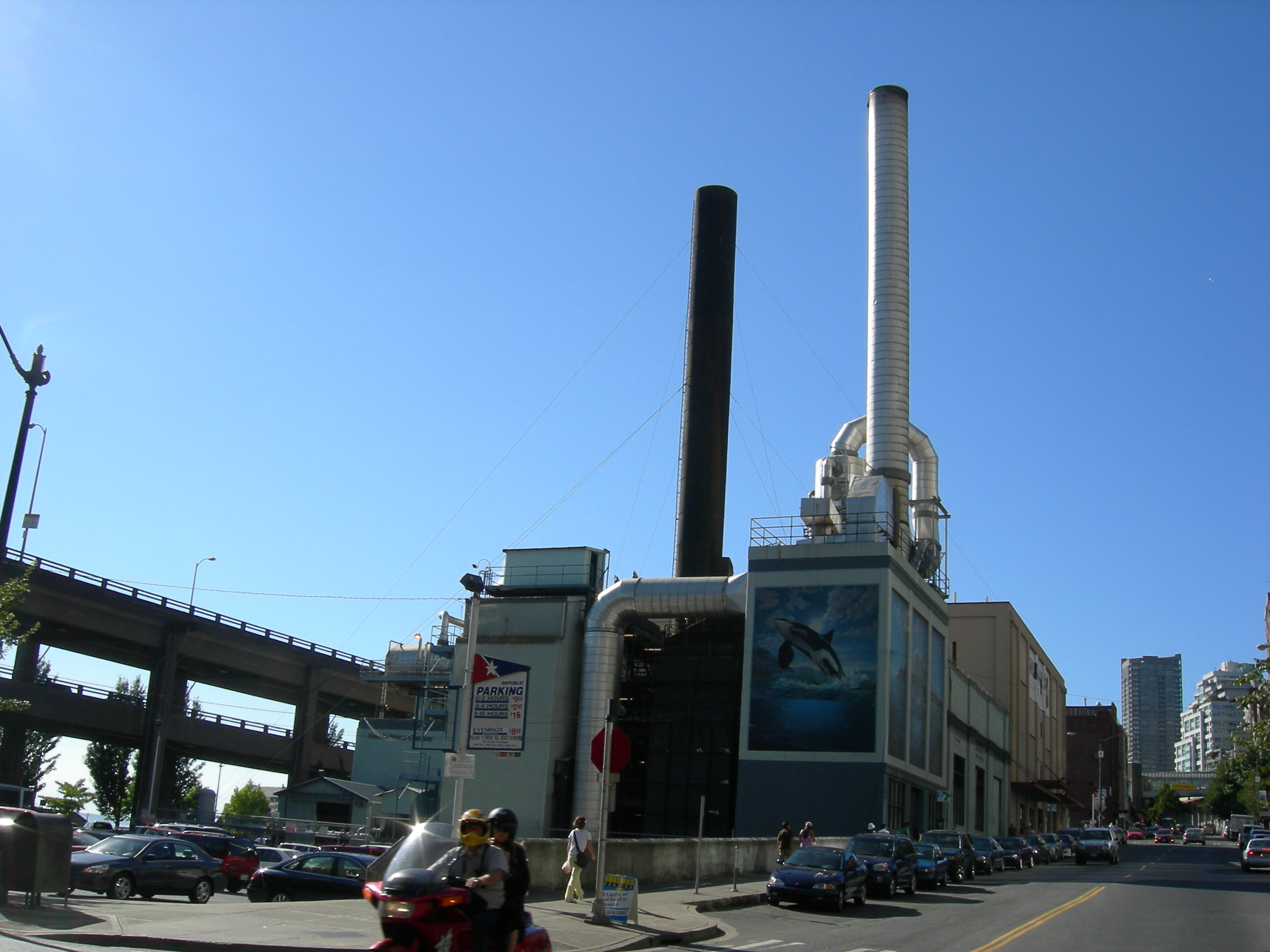
Seattle Steam Company in 2006

The utilities of Seattle are provided by two government owned, and five privately owned, public utilities. The public utilities are Seattle Public Utilities (SPU) for the water supply and waste management, and Seattle City Light for electricity. The private companies are Puget Sound Energy for natural gas; CenTrio Seattle for district heating; CenturyLink for telephone service, DSL and FTTH; and Comcast and Wave Broadband for cable television and cable internet.

== Overview ==
The city's water is furnished by Seattle Public Utilities, an agency of the city, which owns two water collection facilities: one in the Cedar River watershed, which primarily serves the city south of the Lake Washington Ship Canal, and the other in the Tolt River watershed, which primarily serves the city north of the canal.

Natural gas is furnished by privately owned Puget Sound Energy, which began its existence in 1886, generating electric power as the Seattle Electric Light Company. Nowadays, the city's electricity is furnished by Seattle City Light, an agency of the city, which owns numerous hydroelectric dams on the Cedar and Skagit Rivers. Seattle first decided to invest in public power generation in 1902, initially handling this as part of the water department; the resulting Cedar Falls hydroelectric facility (1905) is now the oldest continually operating, publicly owned hydroelectric plant in the U.S. City Light became a separate city agency in 1910, and, in 1951, bought out the last of their privately owned competitors.

The privately owned Seattle Steam Company, founded 1893, generates steam by burning natural gas and wood, and provides it to over 200 businesses in downtown Seattle—where hotels figure prominently among its customers—and on First Hill, where it serves several of the city's largest hospitals. The company was renamed Enwave Seattle in 2014.

== Early water supply ==
The first water system in Seattle is credited to one of the city's founding pioneers, Henry Yesler. He stored water from springs in a tank located on what is now Yesler Way between Fourth and Fifth Avenues, roughly the location of the Old Public Safety Building on the uphill east edge of the Pioneer Square neighborhood, site of the settlement that became the city. From this tank a V-shaped trough conducted water to his mill at the foot of Mill Street, now Yesler Way.

As the settlement grew into a town and city, water was drawn from Lake Washington and Lake Union. Various independent companies provided water to different neighborhoods. The largest of these was the Spring Hill Company, which drew water from Lake Washington. Formed in 1881 by Louis R. Johns and J.R. Lewis, they stored water from the springs on First and Beacon Hills in seven tanks, holding a combined 200,000 gallons. They sold out a year later to a partnership consisting of John Leary, Bailey Gatzert, and Jacob Furth. They began pumping water from Lake Washington in 1884, at the current location of Colman Park. In 1889, they added a 2,500,000 gallon reservoir located at Holgate and 14th on Beacon Hill.

These arrangement soon proved inadequate. On September 24, 1888, Mayor Robert Moran urged the city council to call an election to "determine finally whether this city is to have an abundant supply of pure water at cost, or continue to pay tribute to private individuals on all water used in the future."

In a July 8, 1889, election, barely a month after the Great Seattle Fire (June 6, 1889) gave a dramatic illustration of the limitations of the city's water supply, Seattle's citizens voted 1,875 to 51 to acquire and operate their own water system. In accordance with this vote, the city Water Department acquired the Lake Union and Spring Hill plants for $400,000 (equivalent to $14 million today.). These plants saw the city through until the 1901 completion of Cedar River Supply System No. 1.
