= Jean Shin =

Korean American artist

- Born: 1971 (age 54–55); Seoul, South Korea
- Education: Skowhegan School of Painting and Sculpture; Pratt Institute
- Occupation: Artist
- Website: www.jeanshin.com

Jean Shin (born 1971) is an American artist living in Brooklyn, NY. She is known for creating elaborate sculptures and site-specific installations using accumulated cast-off materials.

== Personal life ==
Shin was born in Seoul, South Korea and moved to the United States when she was 6 years old, growing up in Bethesda, Maryland. Both of her parents who had been professors in Seoul took various jobs after moving to the Washington, D.C. area, eventually owning a supermarket and liquor store.

Shin was encouraged to pursue painting seriously in high school, and in 1990 during her senior year she entered the Presidential Scholars Program competition in the arts and won a full scholarship to Pratt Institute in Brooklyn. She received a B.F.A. in painting in 1994 and an M.S. in Art History and Criticism in 1996. She then worked at the Whitney Museum in New York as a curatorial assistant. Since 1998, she has taught at the Pratt Institute as an adjunct professor. She also attended the Skowhegan School of Painting and Sculpture in 1999.

== Work ==
Shin is best known for her labor-intensive, sculptural process of transforming accumulations of cast-off objects into visually alluring, conceptually rich works. For each project, she amasses vast collections of a particular object—prescription pill bottles, sports trophies, sweaters—which are often sourced through donations from individuals in a participating community. These intimate objects then become the materials for her sculptures, video and site-specific installations. Her works navigate the boundary between abstraction and representation, while considering both formal issues and cultural investigations. She is represented by Praise Shadows Art Gallery in Boston, Massachusetts.

Shin's artwork references a wide range of art historical precedents, from minimalism, with its unyielding repetition of singular forms, to feminism, with its focus on traditional craft techniques, and Arte Povera, with its connection to everyday life.

Her inventory of scavenged and obsolete materials includes worn shoes, lost socks, broken umbrellas, broken ceramics, discarded lottery tickets, and prescription pill bottles, all of which she accumulates in massive quantities. Shin then transmutes these finds through a process of deconstruction, alteration, and restoration. The resulting sculptures and installations consist of hundreds, sometimes thousands, of seemingly identical objects, each of which carries a multitude of potential meanings that inspire both personal and collective associations.

The focus shifts constantly in my installations between individual and group identity, the single unit and the larger whole, the intimate and the excessive. My elaborate work-process mirrors these dualities, as objects of mass production and consumerism are transformed through intense handmade labor.

Shin's work is included in New York City's Second Avenue Subway. In addition to Shin, fellow artists in the "extensive underground art museum funded and commissioned by MTA Arts & Design" include Chuck Close, Sarah Sze and Vik Muniz. Shin's installation "Elevated" mosaics located at the Lexington Avenue–63rd Street station is based on early-20th-century photographs of the 2nd and 3rd Avenue elevated lines from the Transit Museum and New-York Historical Society archives.

== Exhibitions ==
Shin's work has been widely exhibited in major national and international museums, including a 2004 solo project at The Museum of Modern Art in New York, The Fabric Workshop and Museum in Philadelphia in 2006, and a solo exhibition at the Smithsonian American Art Museum in Washington, DC in 2009.

- 2026: "Celadon Landscape", Focus Gallery at Green-wood Cemetery; "Offering", Green-wood Cemetery, Brooklyn NY
- 2025: "Bodies of Knowledge", The Dorsky Museum of Art, SUNY New Paltz; "Glimmer of Hope", presented by Powerhouse Arts and Arrival Art Fair, Studio B at Hotel Downstreet, North Adams, MA
- 2024: "The Museum Body", Amon Carter Museum of American Art, Fort Worth, TX; "Perch", The Trustees of Reservations, Appleton Farms, Ipswich, MA
- 2023: "Second Skin", Praise Shadows Art Gallery, Boston, MA; "Floating MAiZE", Brookfield Place (Toronto), Toronto, ON
- 2021: "FALLEN", Olana State Historic Site, Hudson, NY
- 2020: "Floating MAiZE" and "The Last Straw", Brookfield Place (New York), New York, NY
- 2019: "Outlooks", Storm King Art Center, New Windsor, NY; "Celadon Landscape", Sarasota Art Museum, Sarasota, FL
- 2018: "Jean Shin: Collections", The Philadelphia Museum of Art, Philadelphia, PA
- 2017: "MetaCloud", Pioneer Works, Brooklyn, NY; "MAiZE", Jule Collins Smith Museum of Fine Art at Auburn University, Auburn, AL; "MAiZE", Figge Art Museum, Davenport, IA
- 2016: "Surface Tension", Cristin Tierney Gallery, New York, NY
- 2015: "Inclusions", Trammell & Margaret Crow Collection of Asian Art, Dallas, TX; "Links", Olson Gallery, Bethel University, St. Paul, MN; "Domesticated Landscapes", Mark Moore Gallery, Culver City, CA
- 2013: "Host", Montclair Art Museum, Montclair, NJ; "Intervals", The 13th KAFA Award Recipient Exhibition, Korean Cultural Center, Los Angeles, CA
- 2012: "Jean Shin and Brian Ripel: Retreat", deCordova Museum and Sculpture Park, Lincoln, MA; "Recall", Pratt Institute, Brooklyn, NY
- 2010: "Jean Shin and Brian Ripel: Unlocking", Scottsdale Museum of Contemporary Art, Scottsdale, AZ; "Pattern Folds", Calvin Klein Collection, New York, NY; Los Angeles, CA; Seoul, Korea
- 2009: "Common Threads", Smithsonian American Art Museum, Washington, DC
- 2008: "And we move", Location One, New York, NY
- 2007: "Key Promises", Frederieke Taylor Gallery, New York, NY
- 2006: "TEXTile", The Fabric Workshop and Museum, Philadelphia, PA
- 2005: "Glasscape", Galerie Eric Dupont, Paris, France; "Accumulations", University Art Museum at University at Albany, Albany, NY
- 2004: "Projects 81: Jean Shin", Museum of Modern Art, New York, NY; "Recent Works", Frederieke Taylor Gallery, New York, NY; "Hide", Ulrich Museum, Wichita, KS
- 2003: "Penumbra", Socrates Sculpture Park, Long Island City, NY
- 1999: "444", Apexart, New York, NY

=== Public commissions ===
- 2016 Elevated, MTA Arts & Design, Lexington Avenue–63rd Street (63rd Street Lines), New York, NY; Reclaimed, City of Seattle Office of Arts and Culture, Seattle Public Utilities, North Transfer Station, Seattle, WA
- 2014 100 Wishes, Maimonides Medical Center, Brooklyn, NY
- 2010 Settings, New York City Department of Cultural Affairs, Percent for Art Commission, P/IS 276, Battery Park City, NY
- 2008 Celadon Remnants, MTA, Arts for Transit Commission, LIRR Broadway Station, Queens, NY; Dress Code, US General Services Administration Art in Architecture Award, George Fallon Federal Building, Baltimore, MD

== Collections ==
- Boise Art Museum, Boise, Idaho
- Calvin Klein Corporate Art Collection, New York, NY
- Chaney Family Collection
- Chase Bank Corporate Art Collection
- Citicorp Corporate Art Collection
- City of Seattle, Office of Arts and Culture
- Cleveland Clinic, Cleveland, Ohio
- Fabric Workshop and Museum, Philadelphia, Pennsylvania
- Honolulu Museum of Art, Honolulu, Hawaii
- Lehman Brothers, London
- Maimonides Medical Center, Brooklyn, New York
- Metropolitan Transit Authority, Arts for Transit, Queens, New York
- Microsoft Corporate Art Collection
- Montclair Art Museum, Montclair, New Jersey
- Museum of Glass, International Center of Contemporary Art, Tacoma, Washington
- Neuberger Berman Collection
- The Percent for Art Program of the New York City Department of Cultural Affairs, New York, New York
- The Rose Art Museum, Brandeis University, Waltham, Massachusetts
- Smithsonian Museum of American Art, Washington, District of Columbia
- Studio Museum in Harlem, New York, New York
- Surdna Foundation, New York, New York
- Sweet Briar College, Art Gallery, Virginia
- Ssamzie Collection, Seoul Korea
- Ulrich Museum of Art, University of Wichita, Wichita, Kansas
- U.S. General Services Administration, Art in Architecture, Baltimore, Maryland
- Wadsworth Atheneum Museum of Art, Hartford, Connecticut
- The West Family Collection

== Recognition ==
- 2022 Frederic Church Award
- 2018 Wave Hill Winter Workspace Residency, New York, NY
- 2017 Pratt Alumni Achievement Award
- 2016 Artist in Residence, Material for the Arts, Long Island City, NY
- 2012 KAFA Award for the Visual Arts, Korea Arts Foundation of America
- 2008 New York Foundation for the Arts, Fellowship Award in Architecture/Environmental Structures
- 2007-08 Location One International Residency Program, New York, NY
- 2006-07 Pollock-Krasner Foundation Grant
- 2004-05 Dieu Donne Papermill, Studio Workshop Residency, New York, NY; Lower East Side Printshop, Special Editions Fellow, New York, NY
- 2004 Creative Capital Professional Development Workshop, Mid-Atlantic Arts Foundation
- 2003-06 Fabric Workshop and Museum, Artist Residency, Philadelphia, PA
- 2003 New York Foundation for the Arts, Fellowship Award in Sculpture; Art Omi International Artists Residency, Brooklyn NY; BCAT/Rotunda Gallery Residency, Brooklyn, NY
- 2001 Louis Comfort Tiffany Foundation Biennial Art Award; Asian Cultural Council Fellowship
- 1992 Vermont Studio Center, International Residency Program, Johnson, VT
- 1990-04 Charles Pratt Scholar, Full Merit Scholarship and Pratt National Talent Search First Place, Brooklyn, NY
- 1990 United States Presidential Scholar in the Arts (selected by the White House Commissioners); National Foundation for the Advancement for the Arts Award
