= The Commons at Federal Way =

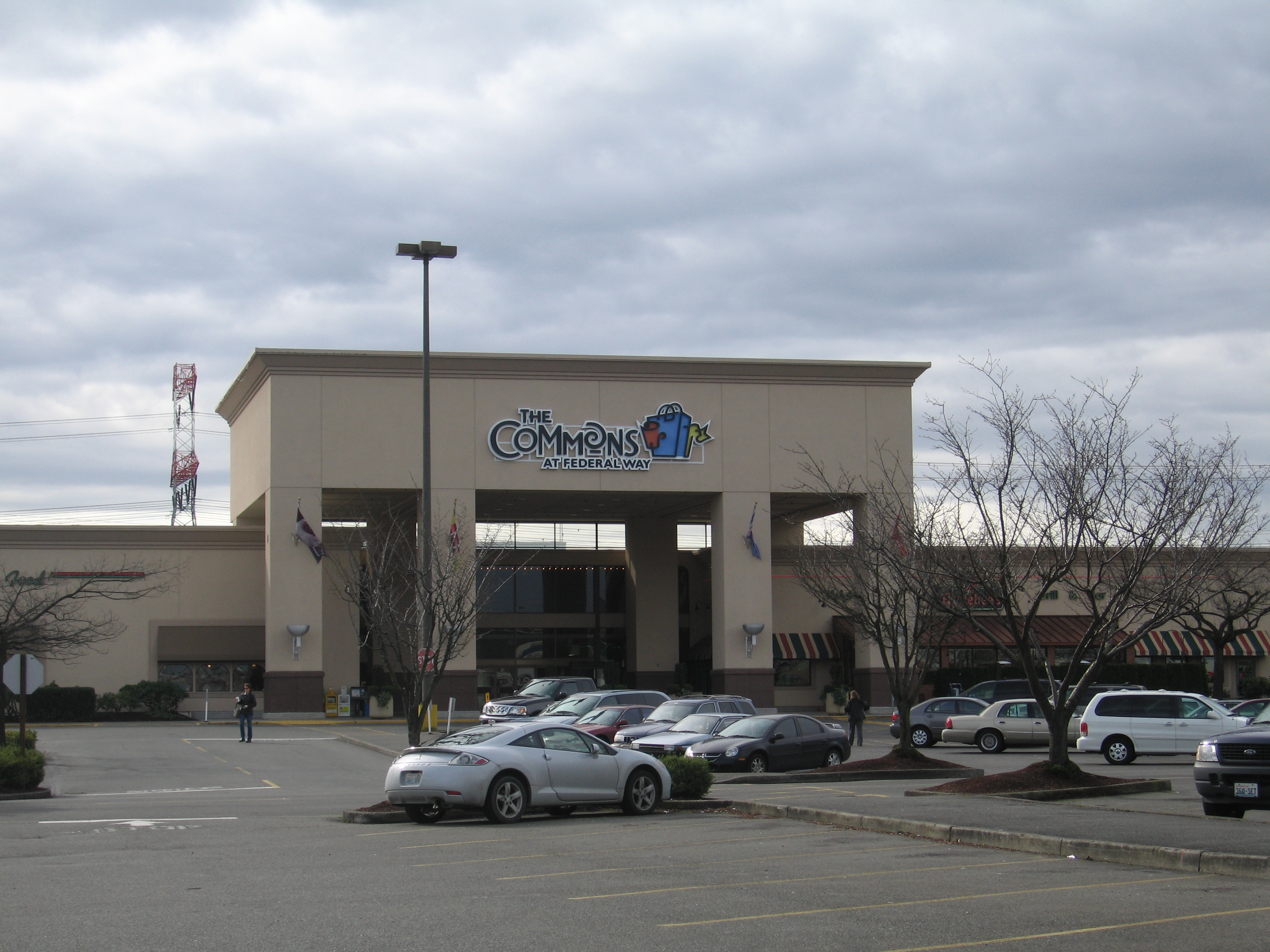
- Front entrance
- Location: Federal Way, Washington, US
- Coordinates: 47°18′48″N 122°18′31″W
- Address: 1928 S Commons; Federal Way, Washington
- Opened: August 14, 1975; 51 years ago
- Developer: Newman Properties and The Hahn Company
- Manager: Charles Sullivan
- Owner: Merlone Geier Partners
- Architect: Nelson WallaDolle & Company
- Num. of stores: 62
- Num. of anchor tenants: 4
- Floor area: 781,791 sq ft (72,630.8 m^{2})
- Floors: 1
- Parking: 3,664
- Website: www.shopthecommonsmall.com

The Commons at Federal Way (formerly SeaTac Mall) is a regional shopping mall located in Federal Way, Washington, and is the only indoor shopping center in the city. Steadfast Commercial Properties changed the mall's name to The Commons at Federal Way in November 2003 as part of a redevelopment program. The previous name had been confusing due to the later incorporation of SeaTac as a separate city.

Improvements to the shopping center in 2008 were expected to improve sales upon an expected $25 to $30 per square foot ($250–300/m^{2}) by year's end. Steadfast Companies later sold the mall to San Francisco-based Merlone Geier Partners for $46.5 million in March 2017. Several stores and restaurants vacated the mall during the Great Recession and replaced with new tenants by 2010. The mall has over 70 stores; its anchor stores include Burlington, Century Theatres, Kohl's, and Target.

== History ==
The mall was a joint-venture between California-based Newman Properties and The Hahn Company; the mall's design incorporated elements of Pacific Northwest architecture, including wood finishes and Native American artwork. The designer of the mall was Nelson WallaDolle and Company.

SeaTac Mall opened on August 14, 1975, with two of four planned anchor stores: Peoples and Elvins. A Lamonts and Sears were planned to open within the following year.

The mall's site was originally a forested, swampy pasture that was the homestead of Mabel Webb Alexander, who arrived in Washington in 1879 and died at age 96. For many years the original SeaTac Mall used a thunderbird in the logo and had a mascot, Thudius T. Thunderbird.

The first Cinnabon opened at SeaTac Mall in December 1985. However, Cinnabon does not currently operate a location in the mall.

On January 4, 2018, it was announced that Sears would be closing as part of a plan to close 103 stores nationwide. The store closed in April 2018. The store was renovated and replaced with an Amazon Fresh grocery store that opened in 2022. Amazon Fresh closed in June 2025.

On January 6, 2021, it was announced that Macy's would be closing in April 2021 as part of a plan to close 46 stores nationwide.

In March 2023, it was reported that Burlington would be opening in a portion of the former Sears space between Daiso and Amazon Fresh. The store opened on October 6, 2023.

Dick's Drive-In opened a fast food restaurant in the mall's west parking lot in July 2023.

An impending closure of Dick's Sporting Goods at the mall was reported late in 2025. The store closed on January 3, 2026.
