= Dick's Drive-In =

Fast food restaurant chain in the Seattle metropolitan area

Dick's Drive-In Restaurants, Inc.

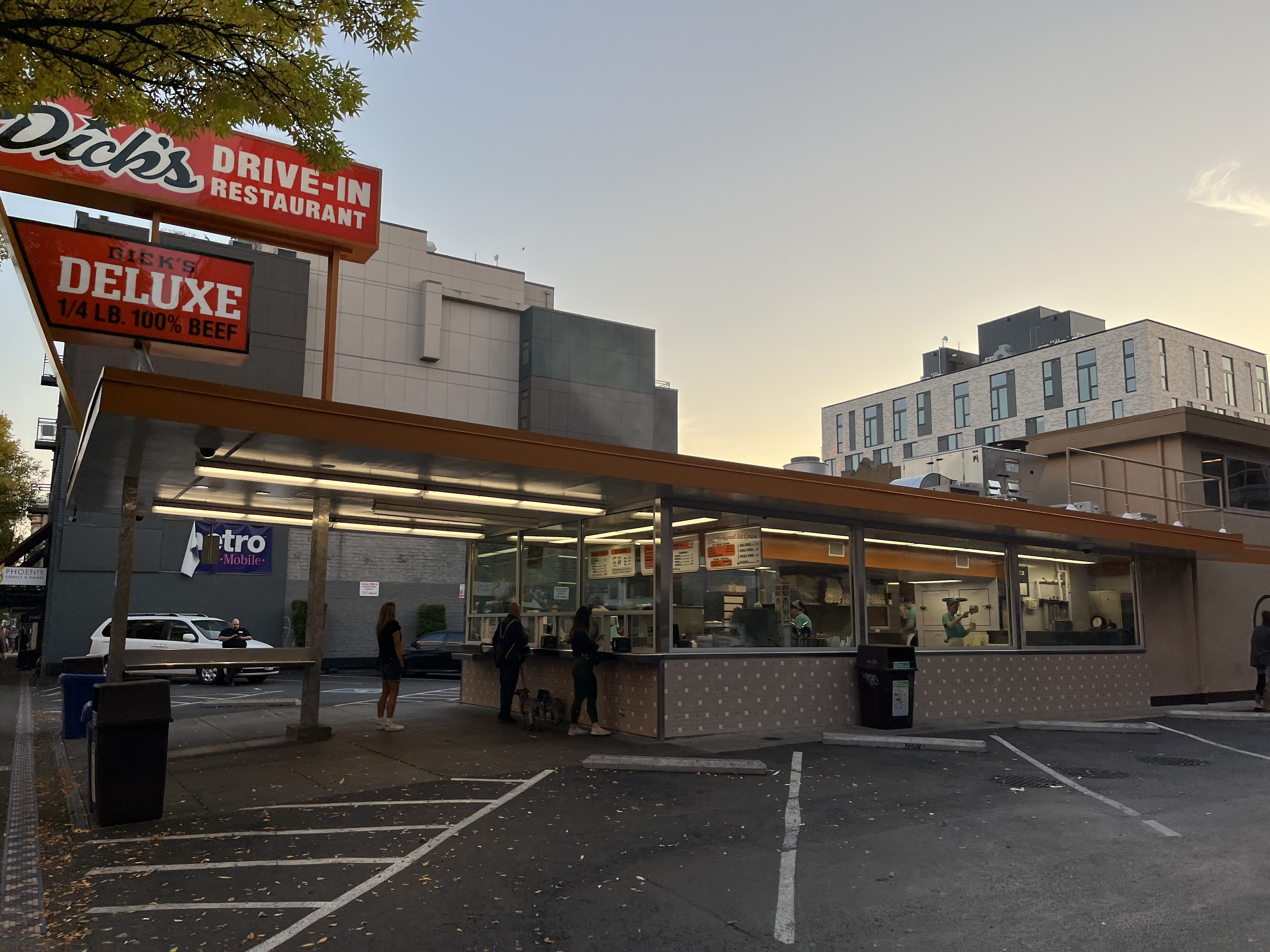
- The Capitol Hill restaurant, 2022
- Type: Private
- Industry: Restaurants
- Genre: Fast food
- Founded: 1954; 72 years ago Wallingford, Seattle, Washington, U.S.
- Founders: Dick Spady; H. Warren Ghormley; B. O. A. Thomas
- Headquarters: Seattle, Washington, U.S.
- Number of locations: 10
- Key people: Jasmine Donovan (President, CFO)
- Products: Hamburgers, fries, shakes, sodas, and ice cream.
- Revenue: US$18 million (2021)
- Number of employees: 270 (2021)
- Website: www.ddir.com

Dick's Drive-In Restaurants, Inc., or simply Dick's, is an American regional chain of fast-food restaurants located in the Seattle metropolitan area. It was founded in Seattle's Wallingford neighborhood in 1954 by Dick Spady, H. Warren Ghormley, and Dr. B.O.A. Thomas. As of 2025, Dick's has ten locations, of which all but one are drive-ins.

== History ==
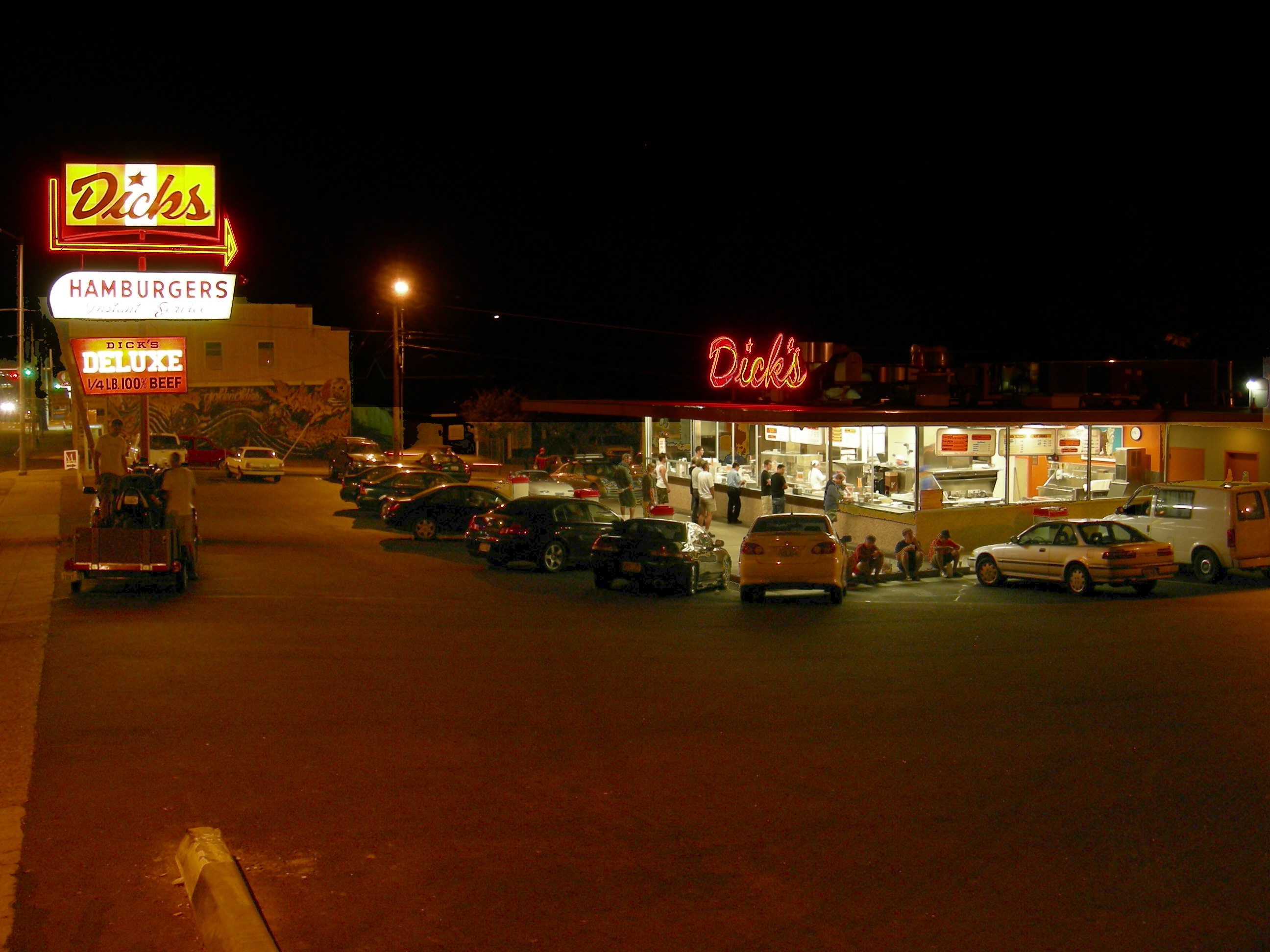
Dick's original location in Wallingford on a summer night

Founders Dick Spady, H. Warren Ghormley, and Dr. B. O. A. Thomas opened the first Dick's on January 28, 1954, in Seattle's Wallingford neighborhood. Located on N.E. 45th Street, the restaurant was designed by noted Seattle architect Raymond Peck, whose iconic design for the original location has been replicated at all future locations except Queen Anne. A grand opening was held on February 20, 1954. In 1955, a second Dick's was opened in Seattle's Capitol Hill district. This was followed by a third in 1960 in the Crown Hill neighborhood, a 4th in 1963 in Lake City, and ventured outside of Seattle's city limits for the first time to Bellevue in 1965. The Bellevue location is the only location to have closed, shuttering its doors in 1974 as a Herfy's opened across the street with indoor seating. Shortly after the closure of the Bellevue location, the Queen Anne location opened in 1974. All but the Queen Anne location are without customer seating. The Queen Anne location has indoor tables and no drive-in.

The simple menu has changed little over time. It features fast-food staples such as hamburgers, hand-cut french fries, and individually made milkshakes. Dick's is particularly well known for the "Dick's Deluxe," which includes lettuce, mayonnaise, and chopped pickles. No substitutions are allowed and all burgers are cooked to well done. For most of Dick's history, the only available omissions were the Deluxe without cheese or fries without salt. More recent menu changes, however, allow ordering plain versions of the hamburger and cheeseburger.

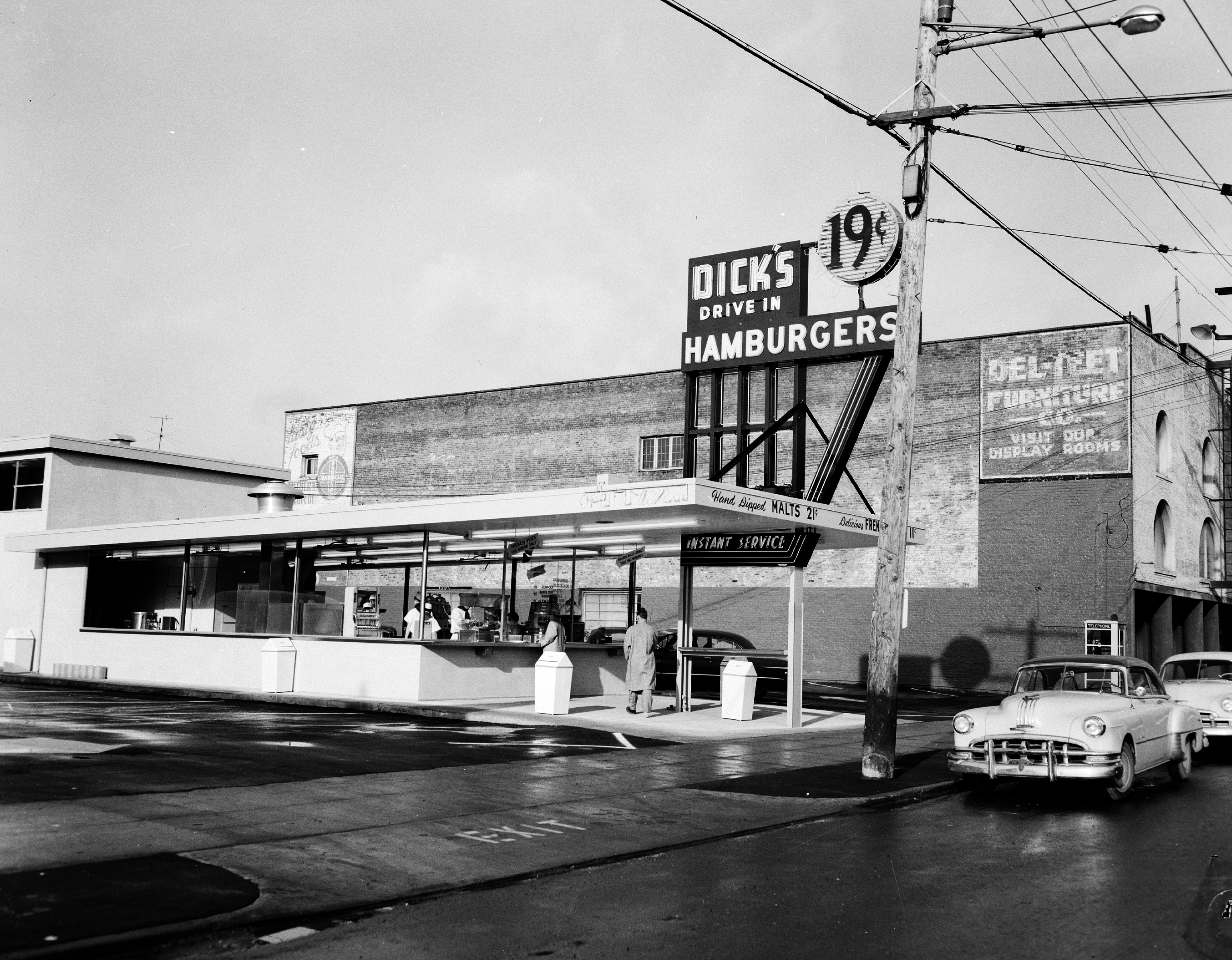
The Capitol Hill location in 1955

For several years Dick's has offered employee benefits such as a 50% matched 401(k), 100% employer-paid medical insurance, and a college tuition scholarship (currently at $28,000) accessible after six months of employment. In 2013, Dick's Drive-In was voted "the most life-changing burger joint in America" in an Esquire.com poll.

The Spady family acquired the remaining stakes owned by the other two partners and began to plan for expansion. In September 2010, it was announced that Dick's was planning on opening its first new location in over 30 years, and an online poll on their website would determine the new location. After a few weeks of polling, the area north of Seattle won the right for a new Dick's Drive-In. On October 15, 2010, Dick's officials announced the new location to be in Edmonds on the corner of Hwy 99 and 220th St. On October 20, 2011, the 6th location in Edmonds opened to the public. The opening occurred multiple weeks ahead of schedule.

In 2017, Dick's launched another poll to determine its seventh location, which would be located either on the Eastside or in South King County. Over 177,000 participants cast their votes, with the majority favoring the South region. Locations being considered included Kent, West Seattle, South Seattle, Renton, Burien, SeaTac, Tukwila, Auburn, Normandy Park, Des Moines and Federal Way. After an extensive amount of time, it was announced on September 7, 2017, that the 7th location to the chain would be located in Kent on Highway 99, 5 miles (8 km) south of Sea-Tac Airport. The location opened on December 12, 2018.

In September 2020, Dick's announced that it would launch a food truck to serve five locations in Western Washington that were chosen through a public poll: Bellevue, Bellingham, Everett, Renton, and West Seattle. The restaurant also announced that it would be expanding to the Eastside once a suitable location is found.

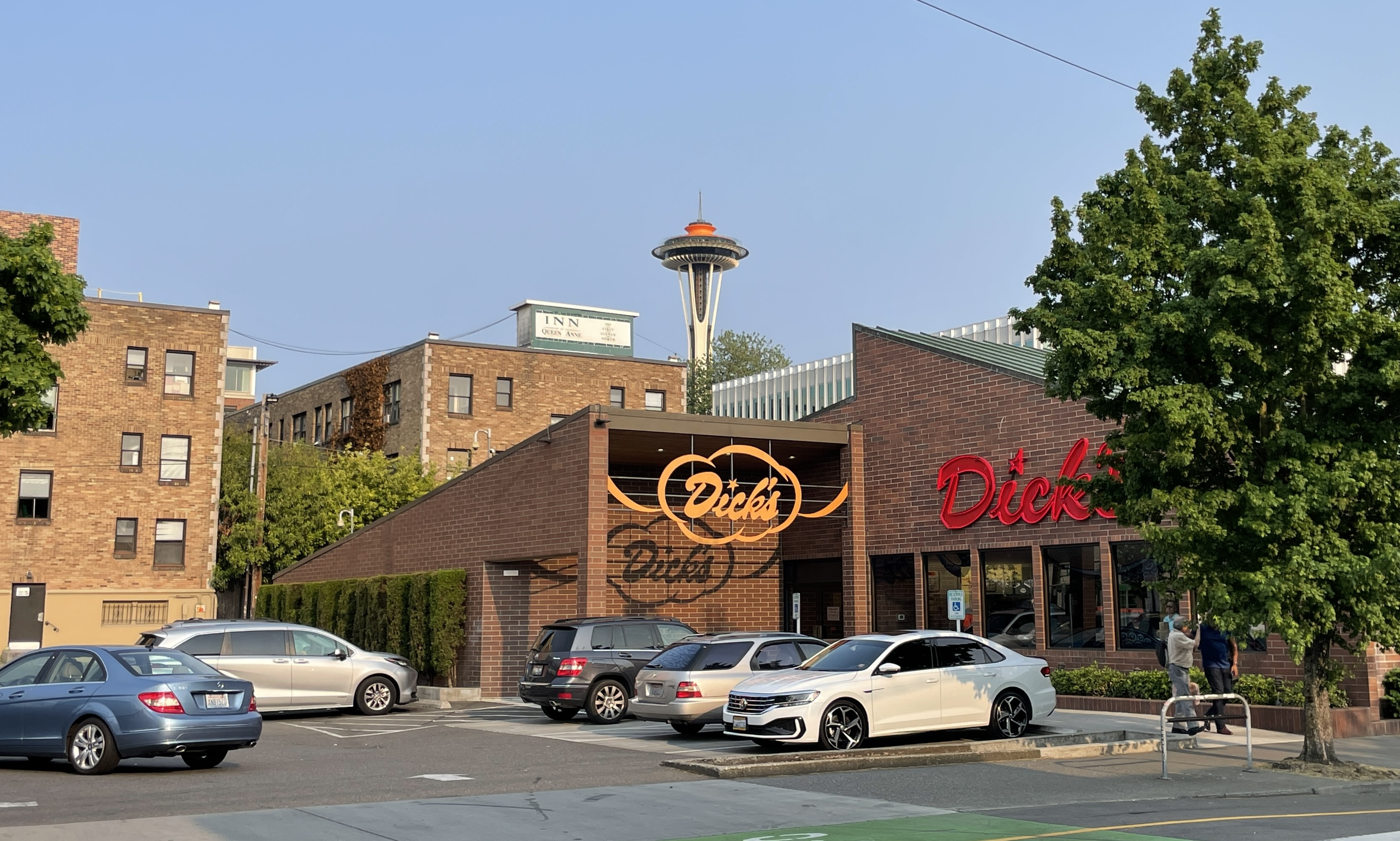
Dick's Drive-in in Queen Anne

A collaboration with local chef Edouardo Jordan of Salare and JuneBaby was also announced with a three-day popup event at the Queen Anne location. In December 2021, Dick's opened an Eastside location at the Crossroads Shopping Center in Bellevue. Dick's then announced on April 28, 2022, that it would open a ninth location at The Commons shopping center in Federal Way in 2023. A tenth location, in Everett, opened on June 12, 2025, and is the chain's northernmost restaurant.

== Locations ==
- Wallingford (opened on January 28, 1954)
- Capitol Hill (opened on January 29, 1955)
- Crown Hill (opened in 1957)
- Lake City (opened in 1963)
- Bellevue (opened in 1965; *closed in 1974)
- Lower Queen Anne (opened in 1974)
- Edmonds (opened on October 20, 2011)
- Kent (opened on December 12, 2018)
- Bellevue Crossroads (opened on December 16, 2021)
- Federal Way at The Commons at Federal Way (opened July 27, 2023)
- Everett (opened on June 12, 2025)

The chain's eleventh location, announced in June 2026, is planned to be on the Tulalip Indian Reservation near Marysville.

There is also an unrelated Dick's Hamburgers restaurant in Spokane. Although this is a drive-in, operated in much the same manner as the Seattle chain (and with a larger menu), it is not affiliated with Dick's Drive-In. It was founded in 1954 and renamed to Dick's in 1967.

== In popular culture ==
- Seattle-native rapper Sir Mix-a-Lot places a scene of his 1988 song "Posse on Broadway" at Dick's on Capitol Hill, describing it as a hangout for the rich and cool.
- Seattle hip hop duo Macklemore & Ryan Lewis shot a scene for the music video for their 2012 song White Walls at the Dick's on Capitol Hill. Thousands of fans showed up at the location for an opportunity to catch the stars as the duo performed the song on the roof of the store.
- Since 2017, Dick's has sponsored a "Seattle House" at the annual South by Southwest music festival in Austin, Texas, providing a venue for PNW musicians, artists, and creators to meet, perform, grab at bite to eat, and feel at home in their journey halfway across the country.
- Since 2022, an annual marathon between the six Seattle locations named the "Dick's-A-Thon" has been held as a fundraiser for search and rescue organizations in Washington.

== See also ==
- List of hamburger restaurants
