= Seattle Steam Company =

District heating public utility

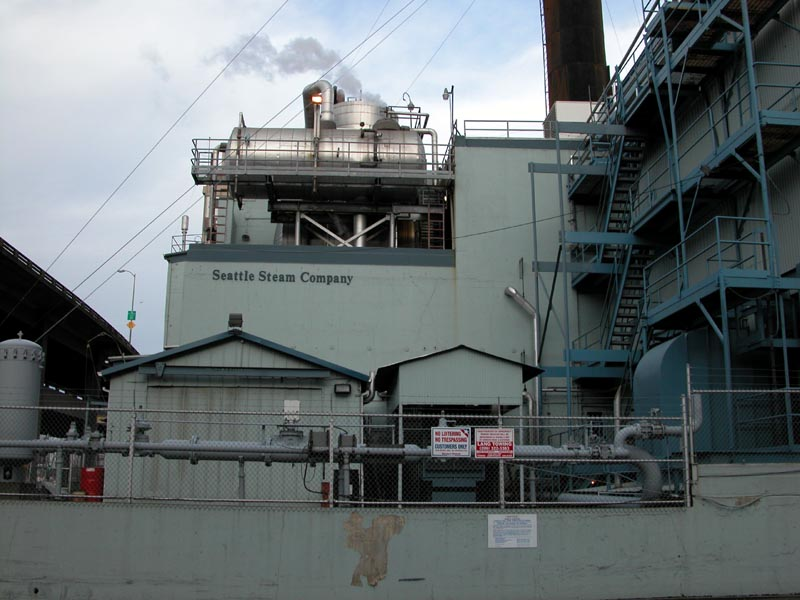
Steam plant

CenTrio, formerly known as the Seattle Steam Company, is a district heating public utility that provides steam (generated by burning natural gas, diesel oil, and recycled wood) to over 175 businesses in downtown Seattle and on First and Capitol Hills via 18 miles of steam pipeline. Its plants are located on Western Avenue at Union Street, just west of Pike Place Market, and on Post Avenue at Yesler Way, in Pioneer Square.

== About ==
Seattle Steam was founded in 1893 as the Seattle Steam Heat and Power Co. It owns 18 miles of pipes under the streets of Downtown. Its average winter output is 250,000 to 300,000 pounds (110,000 to 140,000 kg) of steam per hour; this drops to less than 100,000 pounds (45,000 kg) in the summer.

Seattle Steam's biggest customers are Swedish Medical Center, Harborview Medical Center, and Virginia Mason Medical Center, which use the steam for heat and sterilization. Other big customers include hotels, which use the steam for heat and for generating hot water, Seattle Public Library, which uses it for heat and the Seattle Art Museum, which uses it for heat and humidity control.

In May 2014, Seattle Steam was bought by Enwave Energy Corporation, a unit of Brookfield Asset Management of Toronto, and renamed Enwave Seattle. In April 2021, Australian investment firm QIC partnered with Ullico to acquire "100% interest" in Enwave Energy's U.S. business, rebranding those operations (including Enwave Seattle) to CenTrio.

== Gallery ==
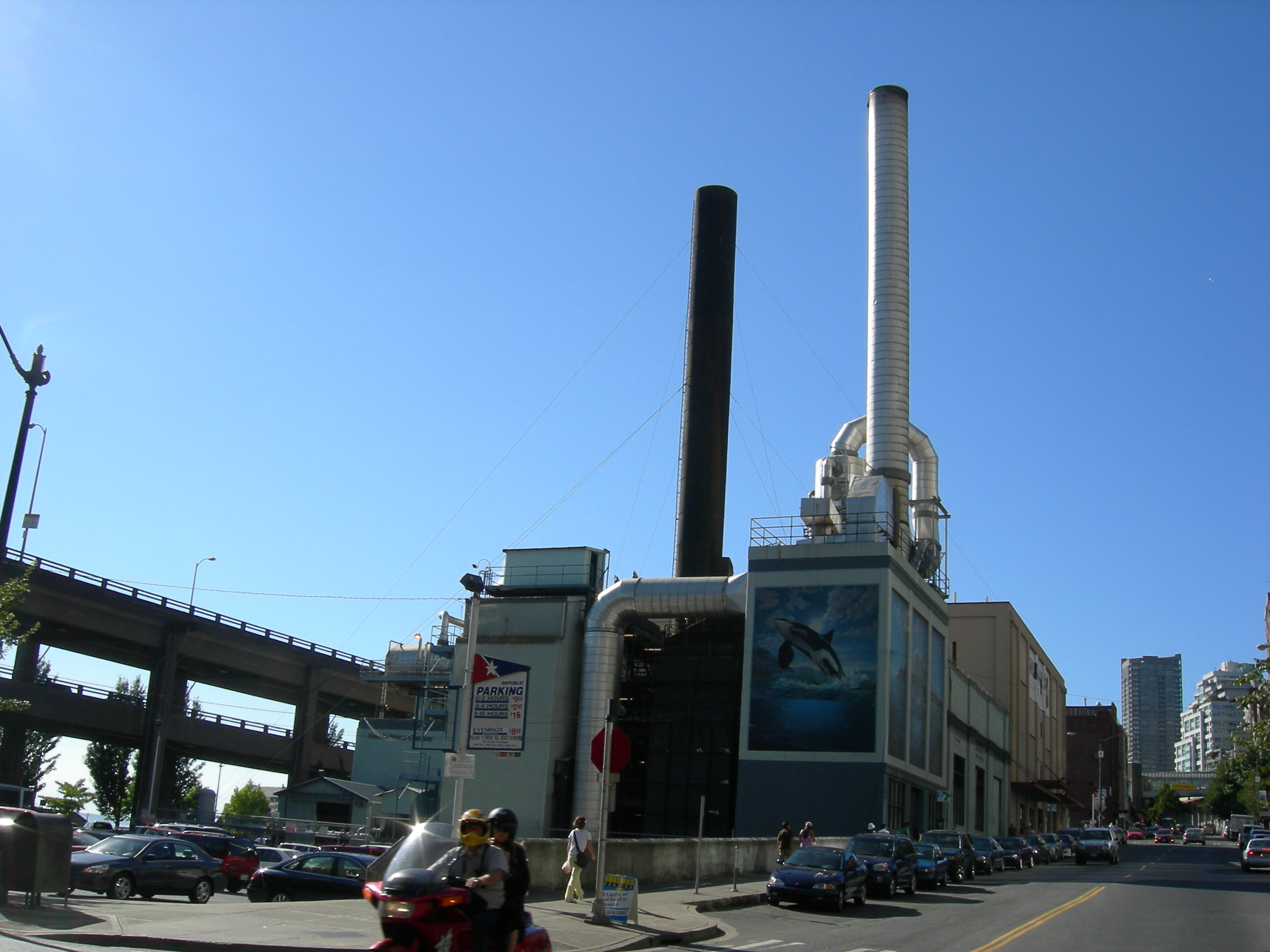
Main plant, seen here from Western Avenue

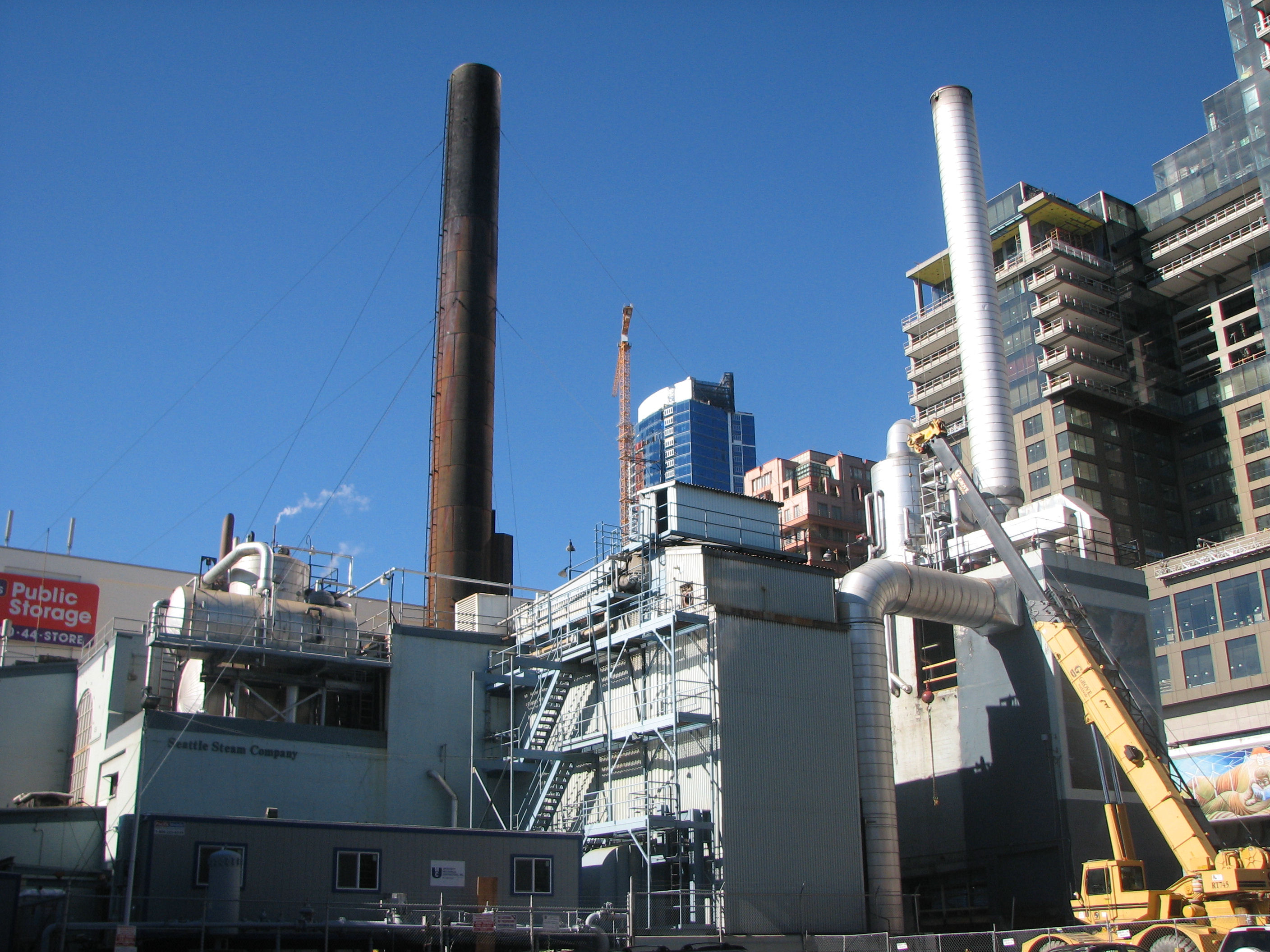
Main plant, downtown

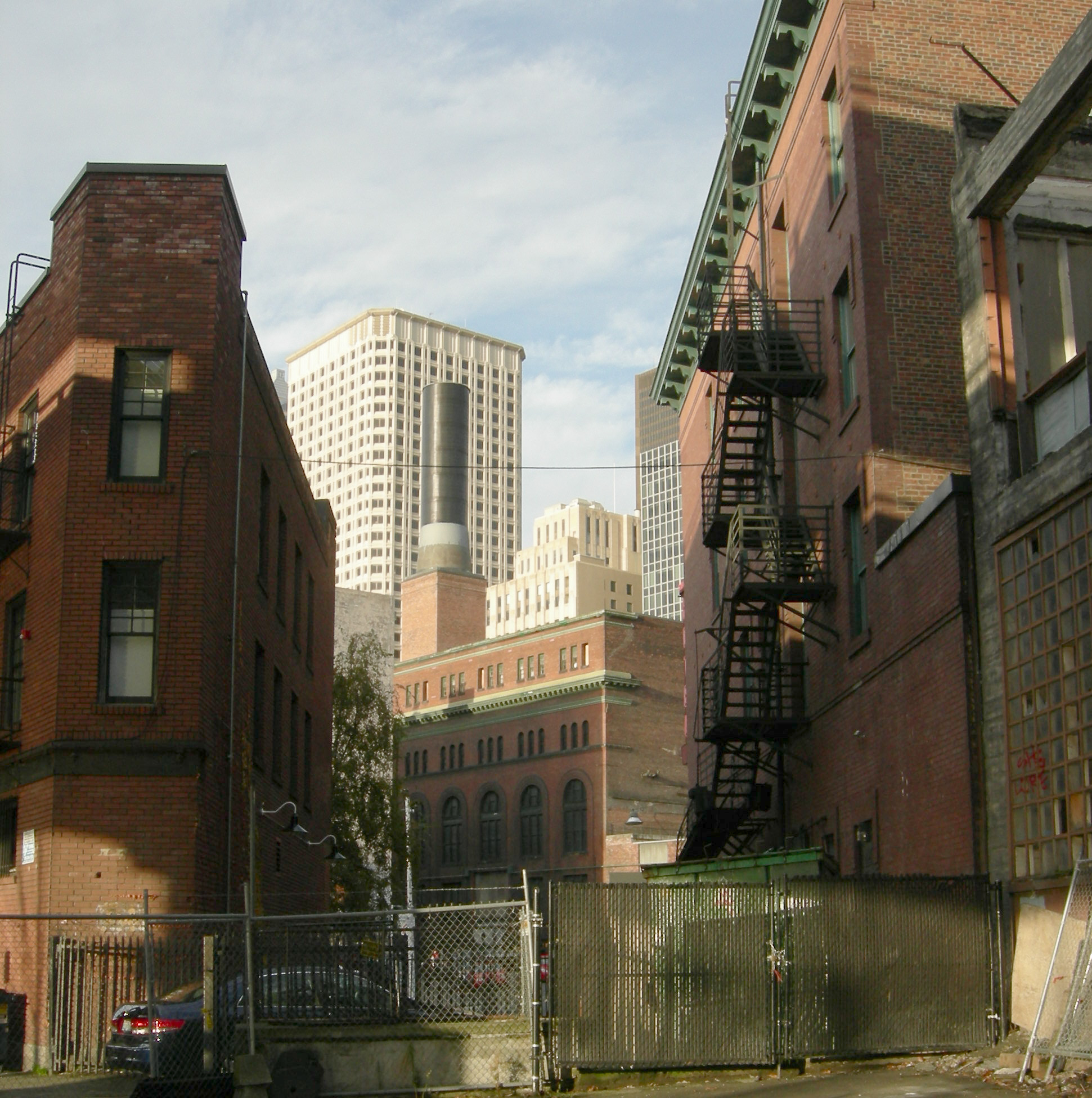
Old Post Station, Seattle Steam Company (at center)

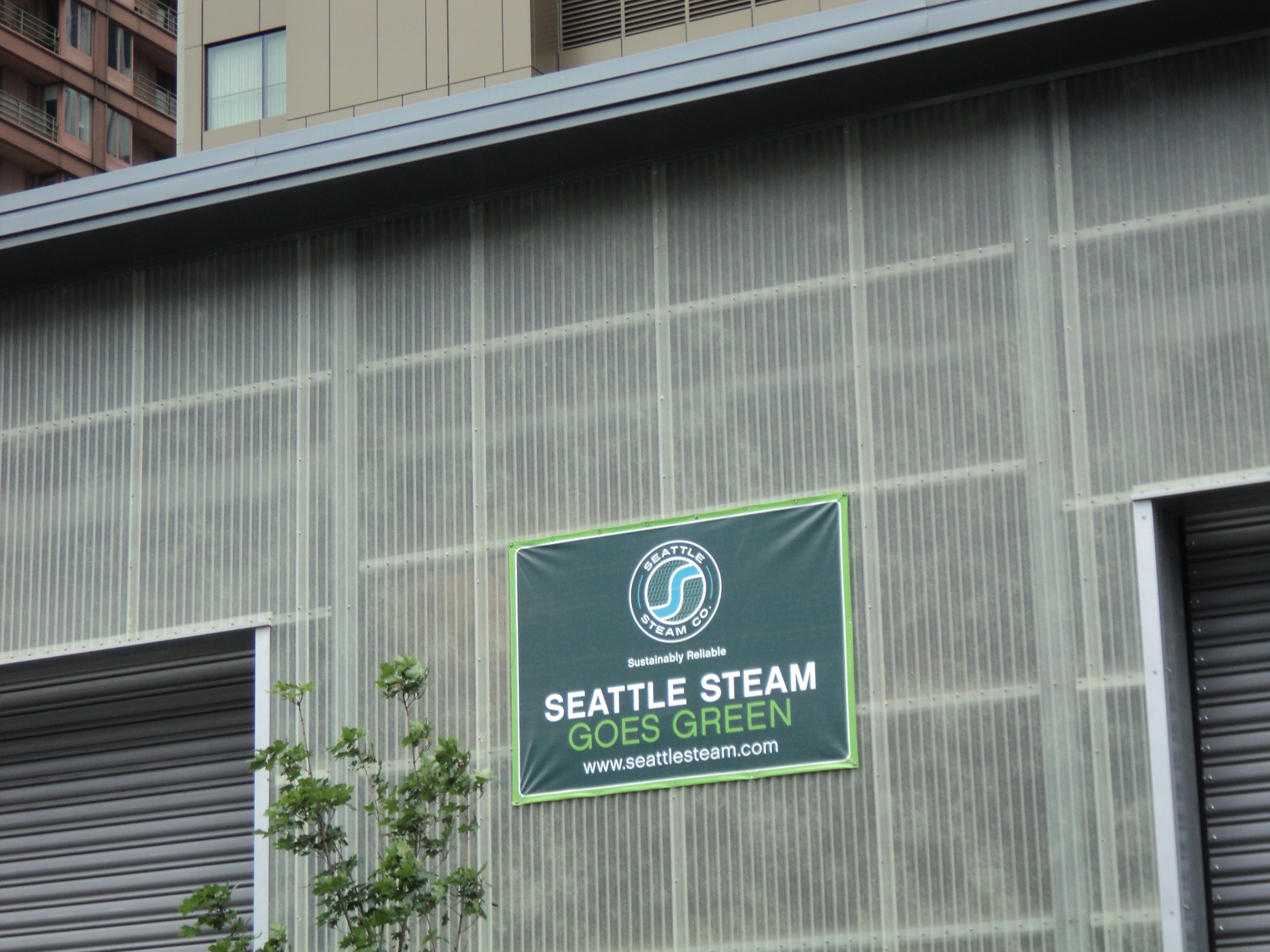
Sign on wood handling building on Western Avenue

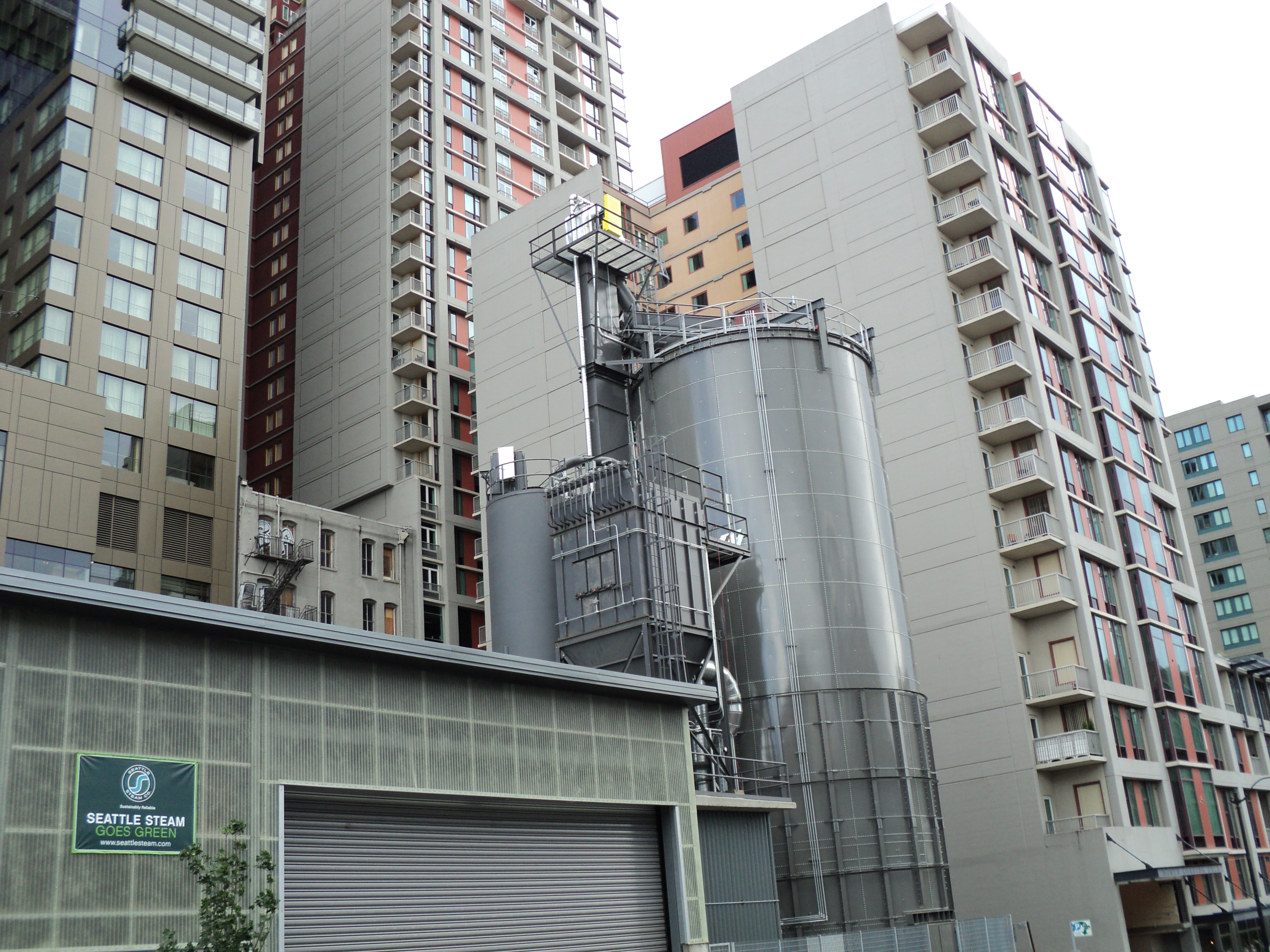
Wood handling building and storage silo

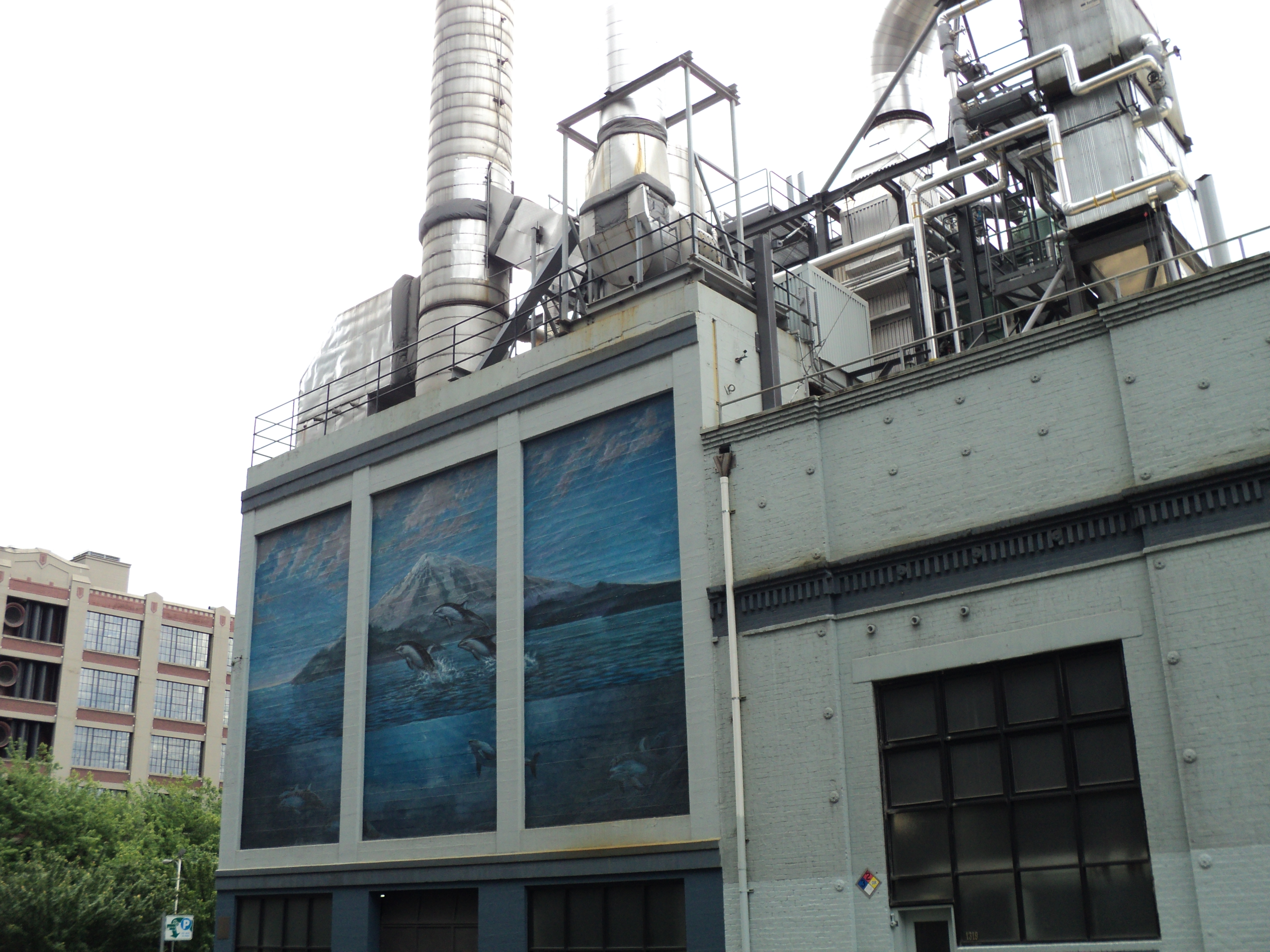
View of the main plant on Western Avenue

== See also ==
- Holly Steam Combination Company
- Utilities of Seattle
