= Cedar Hills Regional Landfill =

Landfill in King County, Washington

- Landfill
- Coordinates: 47°27′22″N 122°02′36″W
- Location: Maple Valley, Washington, United States
- Operator: King County Solid Waste Division

Area
  - Total: 920 acres (370 ha)
- Opened: 1963
- Website: kingcounty.gov

Cedar Hills Regional Landfill is a municipal landfill near Maple Valley, Washington, United States. It is operated by the King County Solid Waste Division and encompasses 920 acres (1.44 sq mi; 3.7 km^{2}) of space near State Route 169. The landfill opened in 1963 and is the county's only active waste facility, serving an estimated 1.4 million people in King County—excluding the cities of Seattle and Milton. Cedar Hills was originally anticipated to be full by 2012, but recent estimates have pushed the date back to 2028, with further expansion planned. The landfill continues to receive 2,500 short tons (2,300,000 kg) of trash per day and has a population of bald eagles and other birds that frequent the area and deposit trash in surrounding neighborhoods.

== Facilities ==
The 920-acre (1.44 sq mi; 3.7 km^{2}) Cedar Hills Regional Landfill is located 9 miles (14 km) southeast of Renton near Maple Valley. The landfill is divided between nine areas that have been continually expanded since the 1980s. The facility continues to take in 2,500 short tons (2,300,000 kg) of garbage delivered by 130 trucks from the county's transfer facilities. A bioenergy plant uses collected methane from the landfill to produce electricity for the Puget Sound Energy grid.

== History ==
The state government originally owned the undeveloped Cedar Hills site and signed a 40-year lease with King County in 1960. The site was divided between a central landfill, established in 1964, and a rehabilitation center for alcoholics. The central facility at Cedar Hills replaced a system of 16 open landfills that were operated by the county until the late 1960s. The facility was initially expected to handle the county's garbage needs for up to 40–50 years, but the addition of a contract with the City of Seattle caused capacity concerns by the late 1960s. The county government paid $350,000 to acquire a high-density compactor in 1968 that doubled capacity at Cedar Hills. The machine compressed garbage into a tenth of its original volume and deposited bales of compressed garbage into open trenches.

King County operated several other landfills, including a "backup" site for Cedar Hills near Issaquah, but they ceased operations in the 1980s in favor of expanding Cedar Hills. The City of Seattle diverted its garbage to the Midway Landfill in Kent in the mid-1970s, but returned to Cedar Hills in 1987. To reduce the burden of garbage disposal at Cedar Hills, Puget Sound Energy proposed the construction of a waste-to-energy incineration plant in 1980, but the proposal was repeatedly declined by the county government. A nearby composting facility was opened by a private operator in 1989.

Cedar Hills was designated as a high-risk hazardous site by the Washington State Department of Ecology in 1992 due to the presence of arsenic, lead, and benzene in groundwater. As of 2016, liquids from the oldest sections of the landfill are anticipated to seep into an underground aquifer by 2058. The landfill is also home to a population of bald eagles, ravens, crows, and seagulls. The county government uses fireworks and other countermeasures to deter the birds, and have sought permission to use similar tactics against the bald eagles. Beginning in January 2025, Cedar Hills was closed on weekends as part of a pilot program to reduce operating costs that are not fully recouped from fees on commercial garbage haulers.
