= Wallingford, Seattle =

Neighborhood of Seattle, Washington

Wallingford
- Neighborhood of Seattle
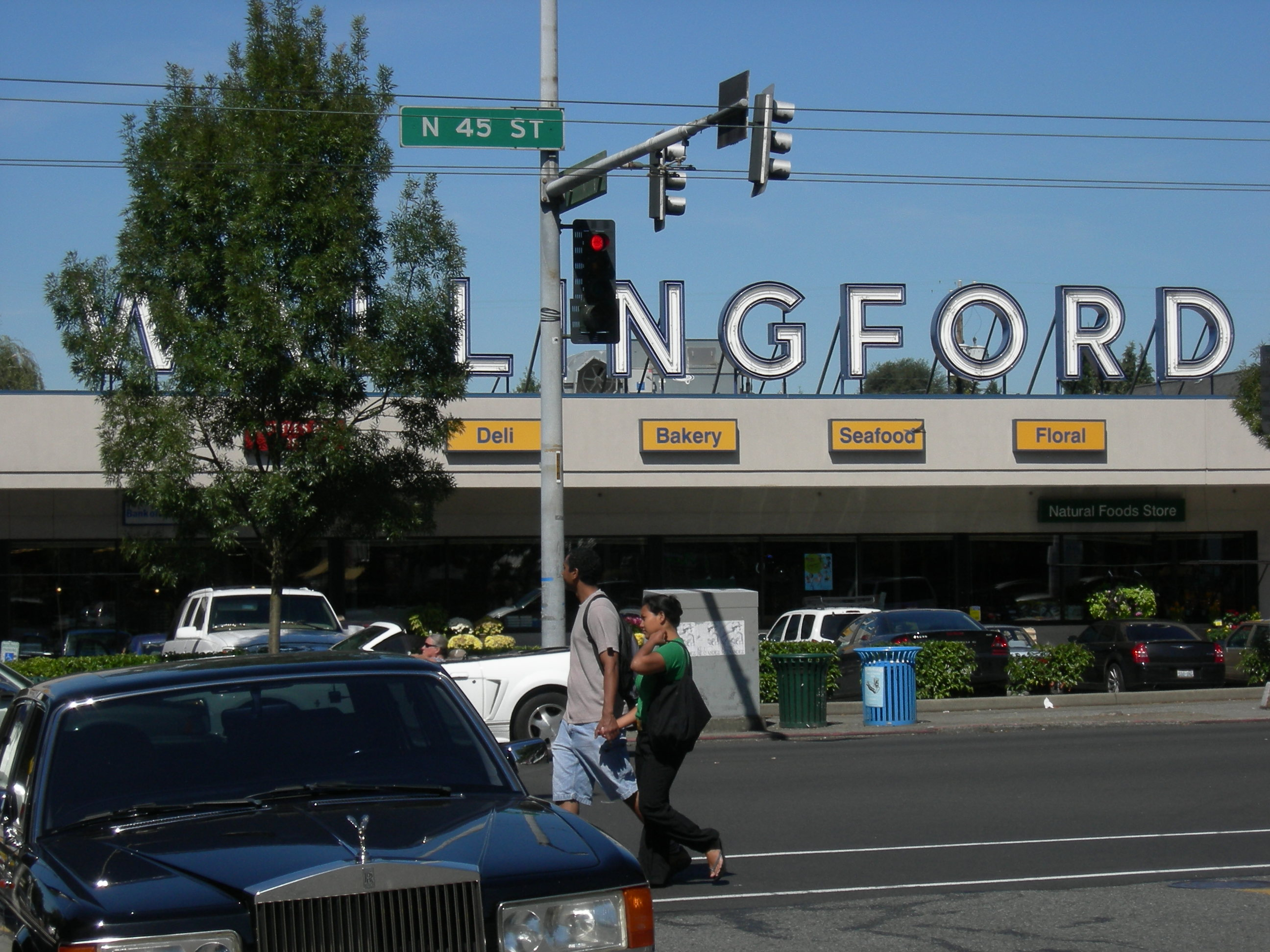

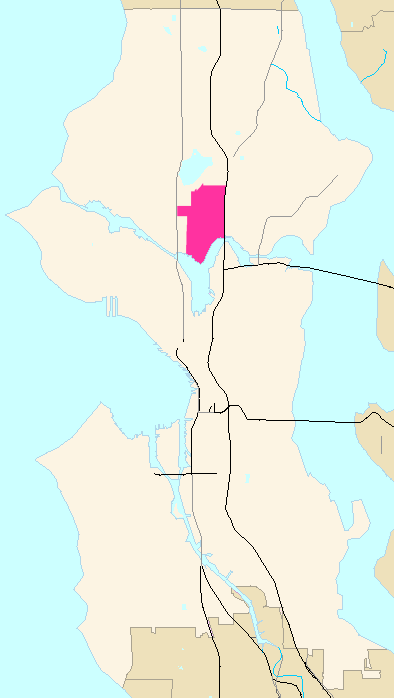
- Wallingford highlighted in pink
- Coordinates: 47°39′33″N 122°20′10″W
- Country: United States
- State: Washington
- City: Seattle
- City Council: District 4
- Neighborhood Council: Lake Union District
- Police District: North Precinct, B3
- Legislative District: 43rd
- Established: Annexed to Seattle on May 3, 1891
- Named after: John Noble Wallingford Jr.

Area
  - Total: 1.07 sq mi (2.8 km^{2})

Population
  - Total: 12,210
  - Density: 11,400/sq mi (4,410/km^{2})
- ZIP code: 98103

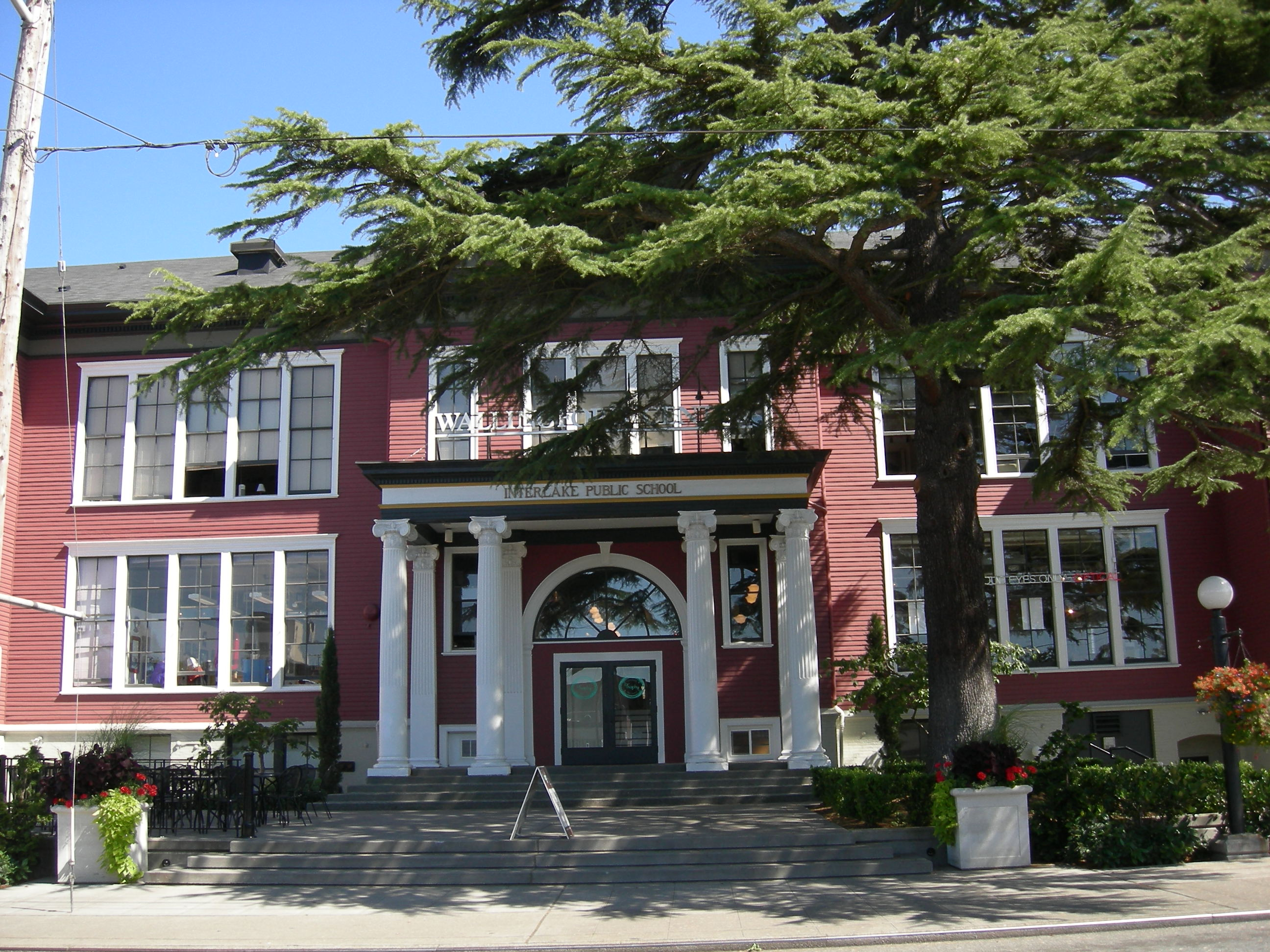
Wallingford Center

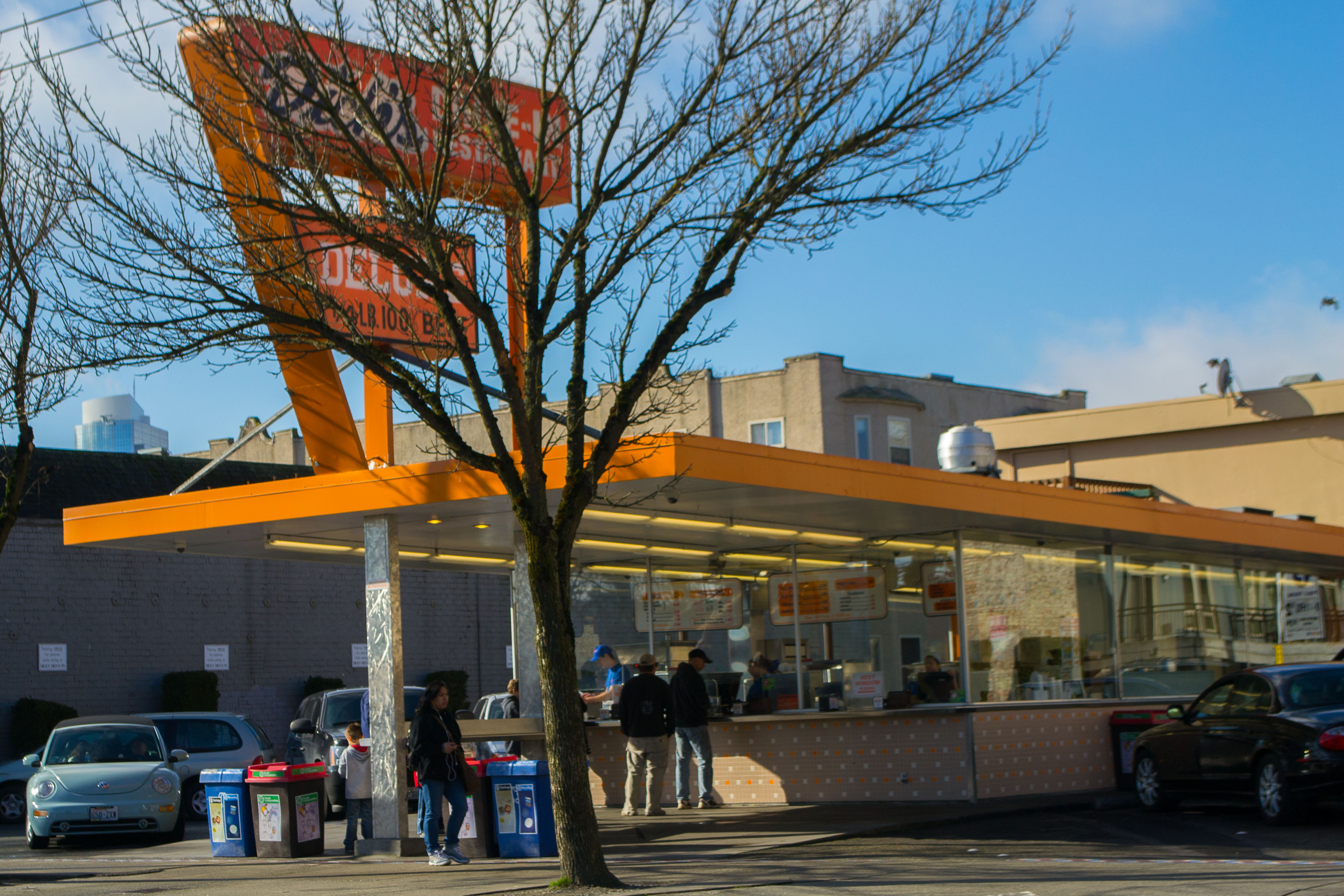
Dick's Drive In

Wallingford is a neighborhood in north central Seattle, lying on a hill above the north shore of Lake Union about four miles from the downtown core. The neighborhood developed quickly during the early 20th century after the establishment of the University of Washington to the east. With trolley tracks laid through the neighborhood as early as 1907, Wallingford is a classic streetcar suburb, typified by its many 1920s era box houses and bungalows. Commercial development is primarily concentrated along North 45th Street where a number of iconic structures stand including the neon "WALLINGFORD" sign, the Wallingford Center, and the original Dick's Drive-In. With its central location, numerous public amenities, including the Gas Works Park, and views of both the Olympic and Cascade mountains, Wallingford has long been home to many middle and upper-class families. While Wallingford is mostly residential in nature, the neighborhood's southern edge, along Lake Union, has historically been an industrial and commercial business strip. In recent years, numerous office buildings have been developed as an extension of the burgeoning business center in neighboring Fremont. In 2014 Brooks Sports moved its headquarters from Bothell to a new six-story office building at the southwestern edge of Wallingford.

== Boundaries ==
Like all Seattle neighborhoods, there are no official boundaries for Wallingford. Geographically speaking, the neighborhood is primarily defined by the sloping ridge that runs north from the edge of Lake Union to North 45th Street, with the ridge line approximately following Wallingford Avenue North. Generally the boundaries are considered as Aurora Avenue to the west, Interstate 5 to the east, Lake Union to the south, and North 50th Street to the north; however the western and northern boundaries are often debated. A Seattle City Clerk map shows an area west of Stone Way North—and from there south of North 45th Street—as part of Fremont. A number of businesses in this southwestern section, particularly those south of North 40th Street, use the Fremont moniker in their names, such as the Fremont Collective at Stone Way North and North 35th Street and the Fremont Brewing Company at North 34th Street and Woodland Park Avenue North. The 1998 Neighborhood Plan defined the northern edge of the neighborhood as North 60th Street, however the area north of North 50th street is sometimes associated with Green Lake and sometimes considered part of the distinct neighborhood of Tangletown/Meridian, a northern part of Wallingford.

The cultural center of the neighborhood is frequently considered the intersection of North 45th Street and Wallingford Avenue North. The QFC grocery store on the north side of this intersection has a large, neon "WALLINGFORD" sign made up in part from letters from the old "FOOD GIANT" sign, which adorned QFC's predecessor for decades. On the southeastern corner of this intersection is the Wallingford Center, a 53,000 square foot elementary school built in 1904 that has been renovated and converted into two floors of shopping and dining establishments with 24 studio apartments above.

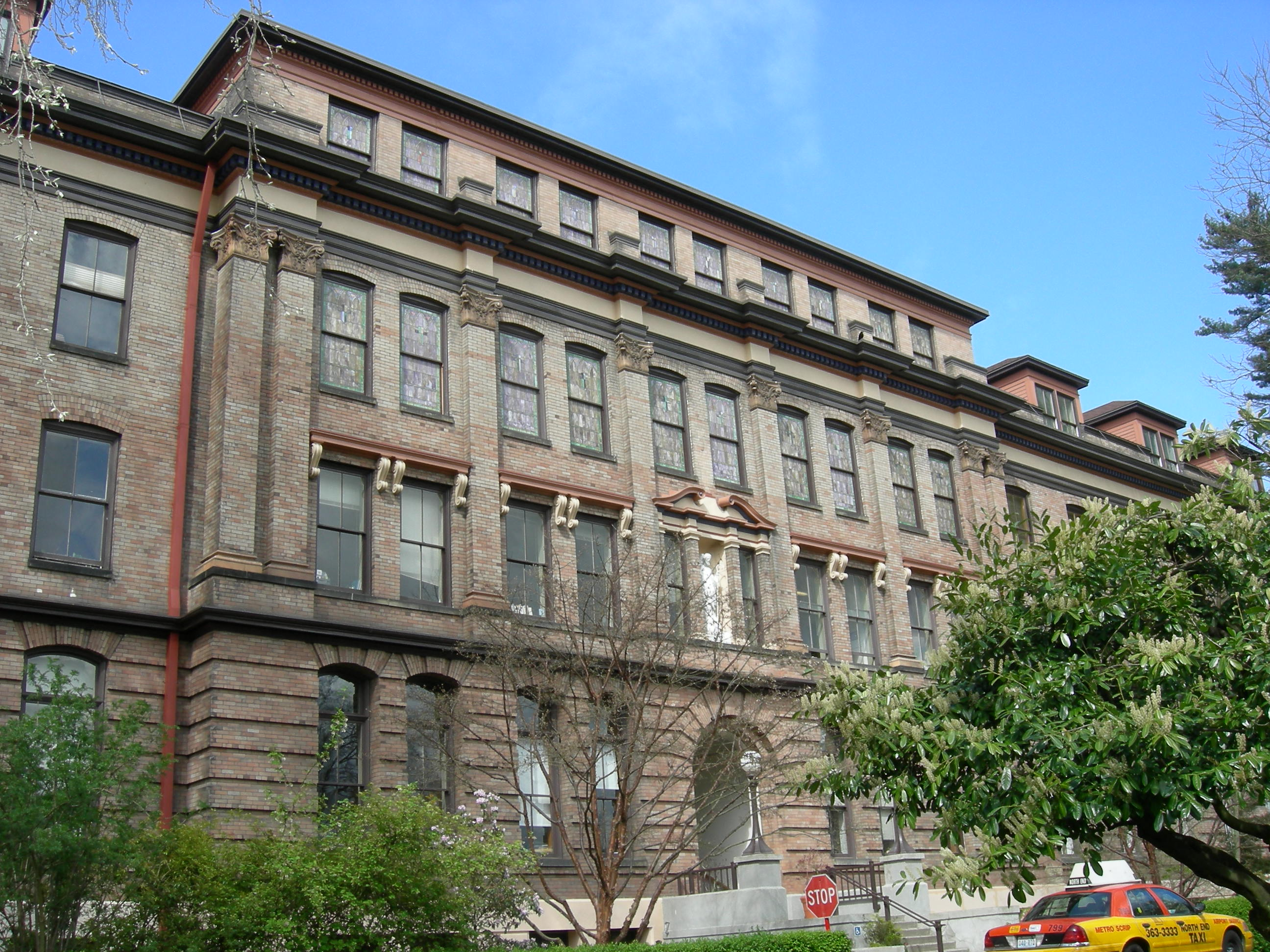
Good Shepherd Center

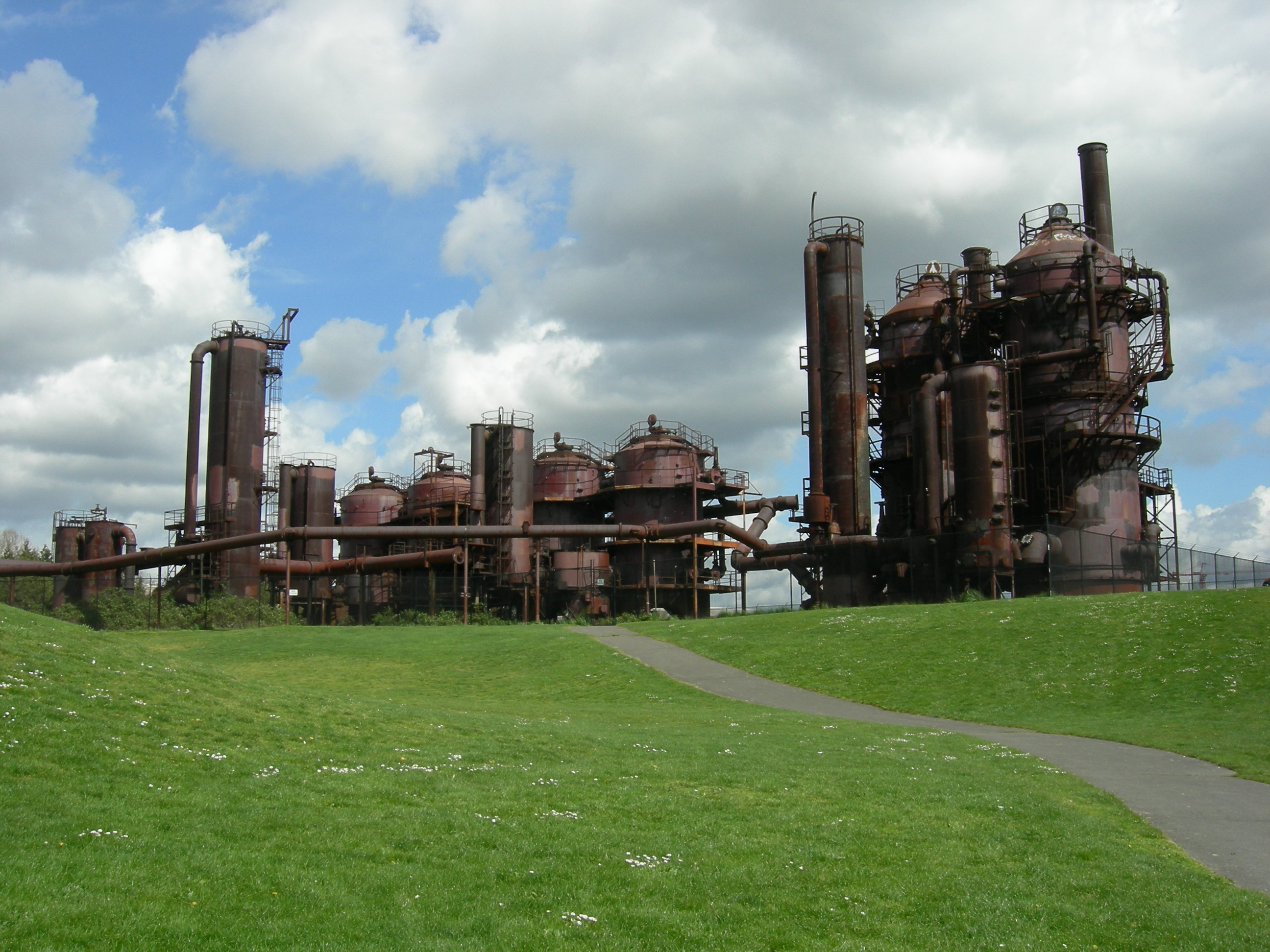
Gas Works Park

== History ==
John Noble Wallingford Jr. (1833–1913) was a major local landowner and real estate speculator; at one time his holdings included most of what is now Wallingford and extended north as far as Green Lake. He traveled often up and down the West Coast of the United States and lived for a time in Alaska.

== Neighborhood character ==
Wallingford's business district extends along North 45th Street, from Stone Way North in the west to Sunnyside Avenue North in the east, and features the QFC grocery store, many small shops, three banks, three pharmacies, a few taverns and bars, the Wallingford Center (the former Interlake Elementary School, now turned into shops and apartments), and numerous restaurants (including the first Dick's Drive-In, founded 1954).

=== Notable structures and places ===
Public spaces include Gas Works Park, Meridian Playground, Wallingford Center shopping mall, Wallingford branch of Seattle Public Library and Wallingford playfield. Gas Works Park on Lake Union borders the Burke-Gilman Trail and provides a panoramic extension into Lake Union, with a playground added in 2018 as part of the 2009 parks levy. The nearby North Transfer Station, a waste sorting center, was rebuilt in 2016 and includes a small park and playground.

Meridian Playground features a former Roman Catholic home for wayward girls called the Good Shepherd Center, now a shared community space run by Historic Seattle. Major tenants include Tilth Alliance, Meridian School, the Wallingford Community Senior Center, and the Chapel performance space, which features the Wayward Music Series. Wallingford Playfield borders Hamilton International Middle School and features views and a wading pool open in summer months. To the north lies Lower Woodland Park, which features athletic fields, a skate park, tennis courts, and connections to the Woodland Park Zoo and Green Lake.

Wallingford is home to several community organizations. The Wallingford Neighborhood Office, located behind the CVS helps organize local events. The Wallingford Community Council meets the first Wednesday every month in the Good Shepherd Center and engages the community with government organizations. Sustainable Wallingford is a residents group dedicated to sustainable living. Tilth Alliance runs the public gardens and plant sales at the Good Shepherd Center. Solid Ground (formerly The Fremont Public Association) is colocated with the Wallingford Branch of the Seattle Public Library and runs a food bank and family support services. The Wallingford Boys and Girls club provides a safe, social space for kids and teens, while the Wallingford Community Senior Center provides a safe social space for older folks. Wallingford Toastmasters is for adults of all ages and meets periodically at the Wallingford Community Senior Center.

Just south of North 45th Street on Interlake Avenue North is Lincoln High School. The school was closed in 1981, but was re-established as a comprehensive high school in the fall of 2019, after a comprehensive renovation in 2017–2019. During the years when the high school was not operating, the school buildings were used house public schools "in exile" while their own buildings underwent major renovations, and was also as the North Seattle site for Cascadia Elementary School, a selective public school, before its permanent building in the Licton Springs neighborhood was completed.

Several motion pictures have featured scenes filmed in Wallingford, including Cinderella Liberty, Scorchy, Harry and the Hendersons, World's Greatest Dad, Singles, Say Anything..., American Heart, Class of 1999, 10 Things I Hate About You, and Three Fugitives.

The Wallingford–Meridian Streetcar Historic District was designated by the National Register of Historic Places on December 9, 2022, to recognize the neighborhood's streetcar suburb origins, similar to a handful of other neighborhoods in Seattle, and thus controversial when compared to thousands of other neighborhoods like it nationwide. The designation covers the area between Northeast 46th Street to the south, Interlake Avenue North to the west, North 50th Street to the north, and 5th Avenue Northeast to the east, which has 570 single-family homes and 66 multifamily buildings. The designation was criticized as an attempt to prevent further density in the neighborhood and preserve single-family zoning, while proponents favored protection of aesthetic and architectural features.

== Demographics ==
While the neighborhood does not have official boundaries, the area roughly corresponds to the King County Census Tracts 50, 51, and 54. While portions of Census Tract 52 would generally be considered part of Wallingford, it is not included in the demographic estimates below.

As of the 2010 U.S. census there were roughly 12,210 people living in the neighborhood. The population density was 11,411 people per square mile (4,406 people/km^{2}), roughly 47% denser than the average density of Seattle.

The racial makeup of the neighborhood was 84.3% White, 2.2% African American, 0.4% Native American, 7.2% Asian, 0.1% Pacific Islander, 0.9% from other races, and 4.8% from two or more races. Hispanic or Latino of any race were 4.6% of the population. The neighborhood's non-white population of 15.7% is roughly half that of Seattle as a whole.

According to the 2013 American Community Survey, 40% of neighborhood units are single family homes, with the other 60% made up of apartments, condos, and townhomes. Roughly 45.4% of units were owner-occupied, compared to 54.6% managed as rental properties. 45.9% of the housing structures were built prior to 1939.

Wallingford is a relatively prosperous community. The median income for a household in 2013 was $76,909, compared to $67,479 for the city as a whole. The median home price for Wallingford was $522,366 compared to $421,000 for the city as a whole. The unemployment rate for the neighborhood was 4.2% compared to around 5.9% for 2013 for the city as a whole.

== Events ==
Major annual events in the neighborhood include the Wallingford Parade as part of Seafair, the Wallingford Bratwurst Festival run by St. Benedict's Church and School, and the fourth of July fireworks show at Gas Works Park. Smaller events include Seattle Tilth's chicken coop tour and the Wallingford Neighborhood office's garden and home tours.
