= Trams in Winterthur =

Former tram system in Switzerland (1898–1951)

Coordinates: 47°30′00″N 8°43′24″E

Winterthur tramway network
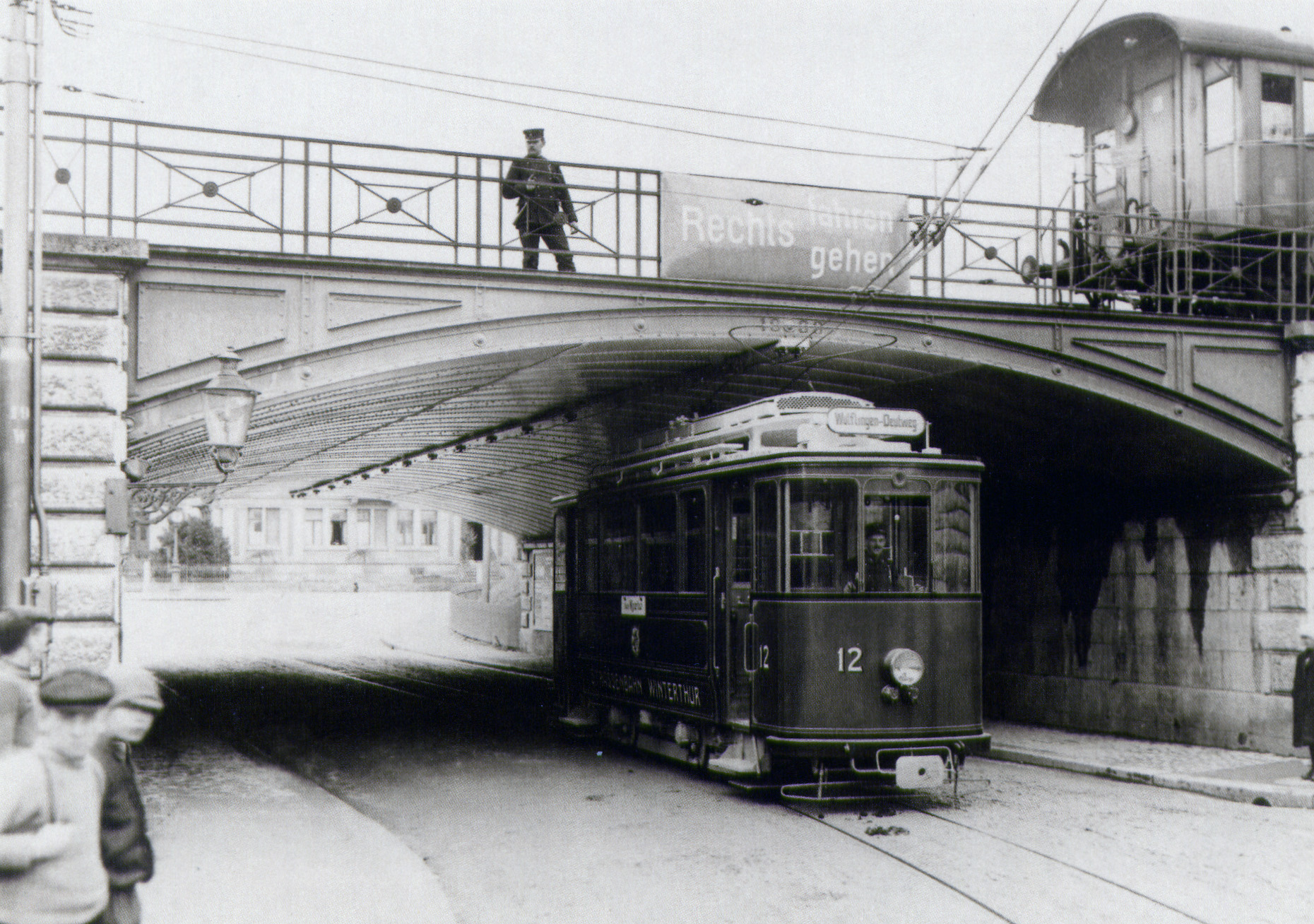
- Tram using underpass near Winterthur railway station

Operation
- Locale: Winterthur, Switzerland
- Open: 13 July 1898
- Close: 2 November 1951
- Status: Closed
- Routes: 2 (max)
- Operators: Gesellschaft Winterthur-Töss (WT) (1898–1900); Städtische Strassenbahn Winterthur (StStW) (1900–1940); Verkehrsbetriebe Winterthur (VW) (1940–1951)

Infrastructure
- Track gauge: 1,000 mm (3 ft 3 3/8 in) metre gauge
- Propulsion system: Electricity
- Electrification: 550 V DC
- Depots: Töss (1898–1914); Deutweg (from 1914)

Statistics
- Route length: 11.14 km (6.92 mi)
- Website: http://www.stadtbus-winterthur.ch Stadtbus Winterthur (in German)

The Winterthur tramway network (Alemannic German: Strassenbahnnetz Winterthur) was part of the public transport network of the city of Winterthur, in the canton of Zürich, Switzerland, for more than 50 years.

Opened in 1898, the network also served the neighbouring communities of Töss, Wülflingen, Oberwinterthur and Seen, all of which were incorporated into the municipality of Winterthur in 1922. After reaching its maximum extent in 1931, the network was gradually replaced from 1938 by the Winterthur trolleybus system, until the network's closure in 1951.

Throughout its existence, the network's operator was the Gesellschaft Winterthur-Töss (WT), which was renamed Städtische Strassenbahn Winterthur (StStW) in 1900 and Verkehrsbetriebe Winterthur (VW) in 1940. The company still exists today, as Stadtbus Winterthur (DE).

== History ==
The tramway network, which opened on 13 July 1898, was the second form of public transport in Winterthur, after a horse-drawn omnibus service, which had run between 1895 and 1897. The network's first tramway was a 1.77 km (1.10 mi) long radial route from Bahnhof (Winterthur railway station) to Töss. It served as a complement to the existing Winterthur–Bülach–Koblenz railway line, which had been in service since 1876, and which already had a station at Töss.

The trams on the first tramway ran every 10 minutes, and a single ticket cost ten Rappen. The city centre terminus was initially not outside the railway station, but at the Restaurant Wartmann – that is, at the junction of the Wartstrasse and the Rudolfstrasse and thus on the western side of the station yard. The Töss terminus was located approximately at the current Töss Zentrum trolleybus stop.

Initially, the trams were stored and maintained in a wooden depot on the grounds of the Töss-based Maschinenfabrik Rieter. A 274 m (899 ft) long non-revenue track was constructed in Töss to link the depot with the rest of the network. Rieter was also engaged by the city as general contractor in respect of the tracks, the catenary and the first generation trams. In addition, the company was responsible for supplying electric current to the catenary until 1904, when the Winterthur municipal power station took over that task. The voltage used to power the network was 550 volts DC.

After the turn of the century, the network was extended as follows:

1 November 1912	Zürcherstrasse/Rudolfstrasse–Bahnhofplatz ^{[1]}	0.116 km	Line 1
31 October 1914	Bahnhofplatz–Deutweg	1.894 km	Non-passenger carrying line, from 28 January 1915 Line 2
31 October 1914	Deutweg–Depot Deutweg ^{[2]}	0.069 km	Non-passenger carrying line, from 30 November 1922 Line 2
28 January 1915	Bahnhofplatz–Stadtrainbrücke	1.054 km	Line 1
28 January 1915	Bahnhofplatz–Wülflingen Lindenplatz	2.973 km	Line 2
30 November 1922	Depot Deutweg–Seen Schulhaus	1.867 km	Line 2
22 March 1926	Stadtrainbrücke–Stadtrain	circa 0.3 km	Line 1
18 December 1931	Stadtrain–Bahnhof Oberwinterthur	1.056 km	Line 1

- ^{[1]} = Simultaneously, the circa 200 m long section in the Rudolfstrasse was closed.
- ^{[2]} = Simultaneously, the non-passenger carrying line in Töss was closed.

Additionally, on 31 October 1914, the StStW opened a tram deport of its own in Tösstalstrasse in the present-day Mattenbach quarter. This so-called Depot Deutweg remains in service to this day, as a bus garage.

With the last extension of the network to Oberwinterthur, the tram network reached its maximum extent of 11.140 km (6.922 mi), of which 1.154 km (0.717 mi) was double track. Any further expansion of tram routes – for example, a proposed extension to the central cemetery in Rosenberg – remained unrealised, as a consequence of either the introduction of motor bus services in 1931, or the forced conversion to trolleybuses from 1938.

Following a referendum on 20 February 1938, the tramway network was replaced by trolleybus routes as follows:

28 December 1938	Bahnhof–Wülflingen Lindenplatz	Line 2
24 July 1941	Bahnhof–Seen Schulhaus	Line 2
6 October 1951	Bahnhof–Töss	Line 1
3 November 1951	Bahnhof–Bahnhof Oberwinterthur	Line 1

== See also ==
- List of town tramway systems in Switzerland
