= Blumenau (Winterthur) =

Quarter in Winterthur, Switzerland

Coordinates: 47°30′26″N 8°42′41″E

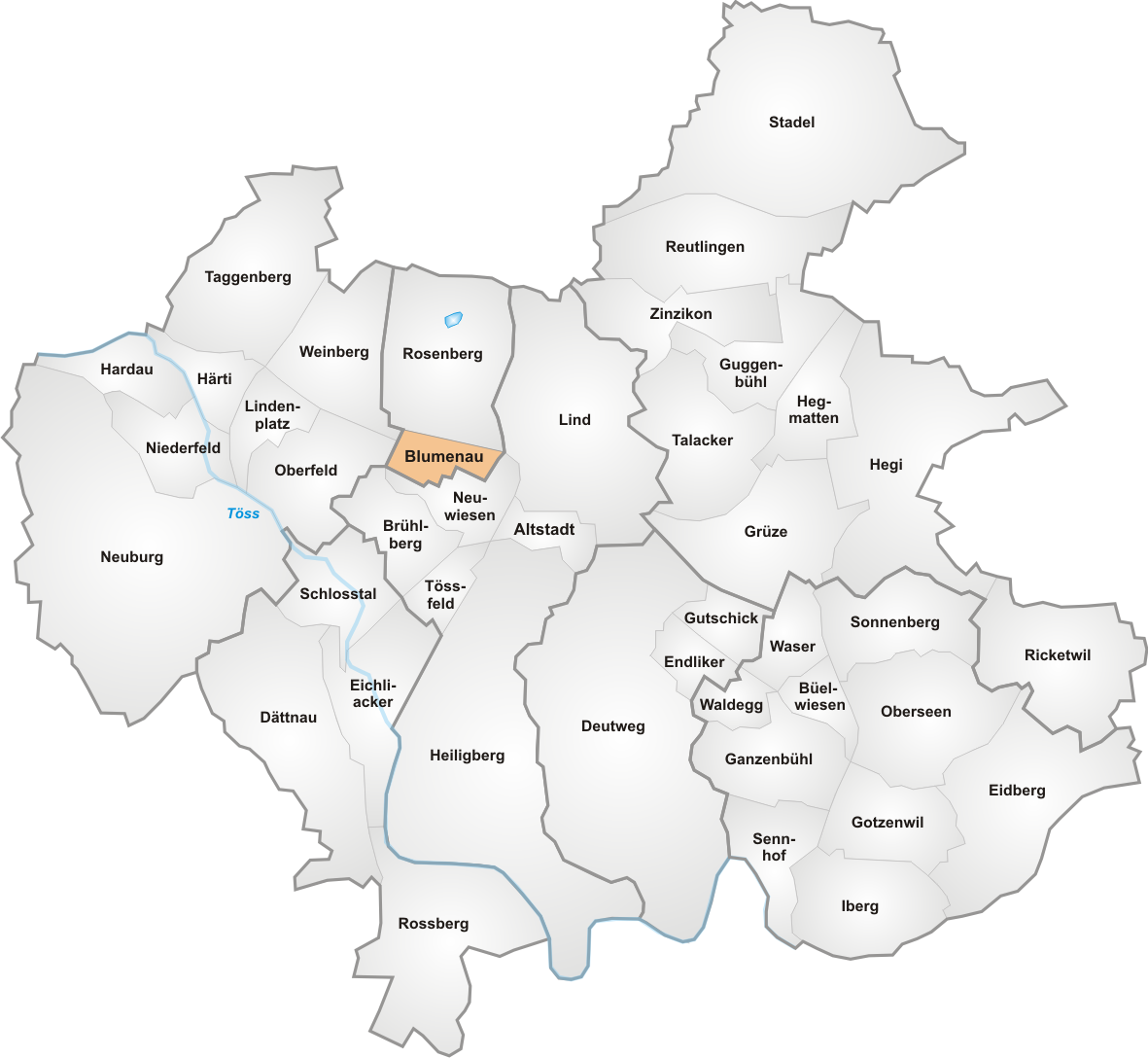
The quarter of Blumenau in Winterthur.

Blumenau is a quarter in Winterthur, Zürich, Switzerland. It was at one point a part of Veltheim, which was its own municipality, but Veltheim was incorporated into Winterthur in 1922.
