= ISW =

ISW may refer to:

- Integrated Sachs–Wolfe effect, a gravitational redshift of CMB radiation
- Institute for the Study of War, an American research group
- International School Winterthur, Switzerland
- Incredibly Strange Wrestling, a wrestling promotion in California
- Indiana Southwestern Railway, United States
- South Wood County Airport, Wisconsin, United States
- International Sponsors of War - Ukrainian list of international companies still operating in Russia after 2022
