= Stadt (Winterthur) =

Coordinates: 47.499°N 8.729°E

Stadt District of the city of Winterthur
- District
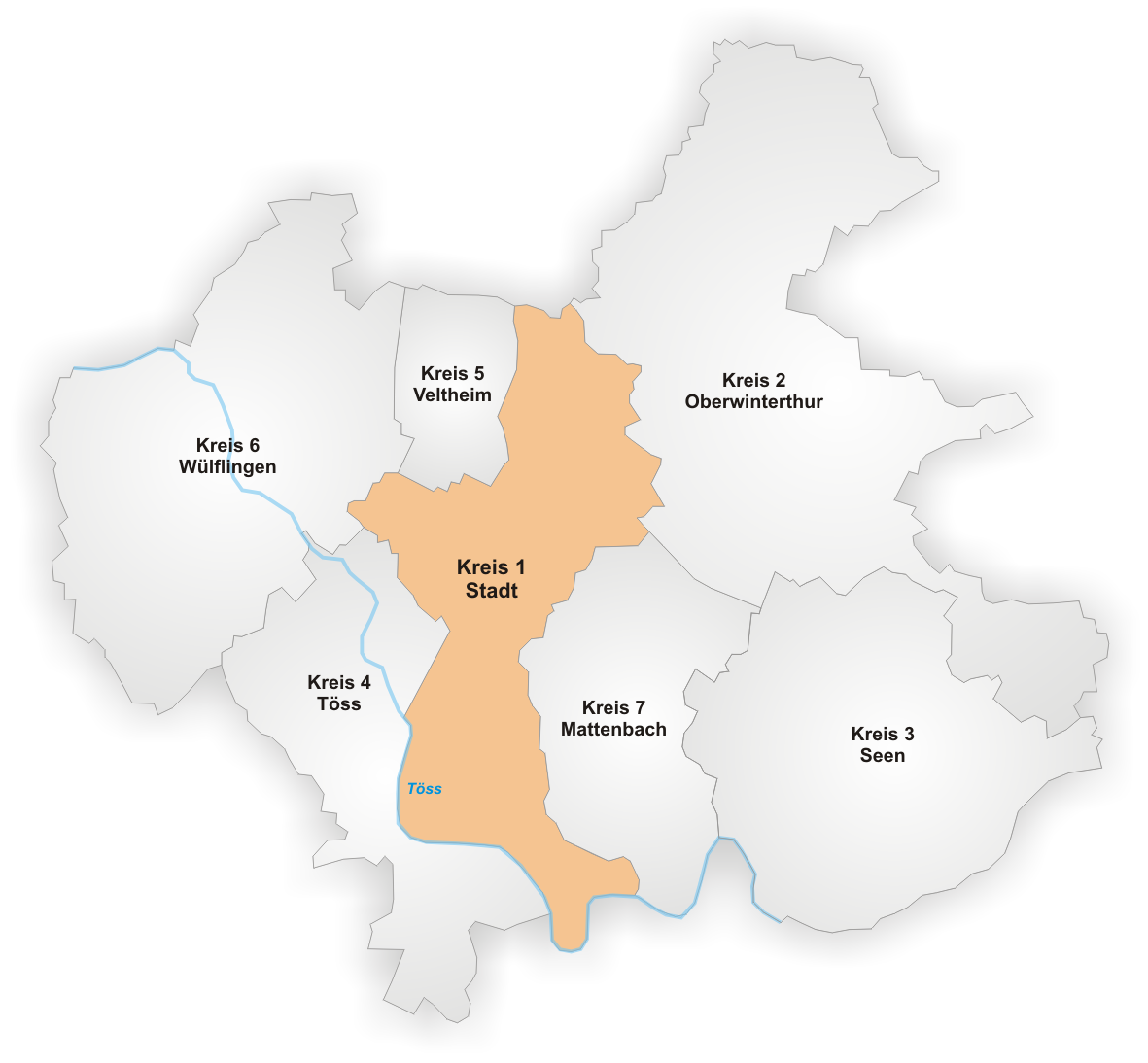
- Country: Switzerland
- Canton: Zürich
- City: Winterthur

Area
  - Total: 10.39 km^{2} (4.01 sq mi)

Population (31 Dec 2012)
  - Total: 19,593
- District number: 1
- Quarters: Altstadt; Lind; Heiligberg; Tössfeld; Brühlberg; Neuwiesen

Stadt (German pronunciation: [ʃtat], lit. 'City') is a district in the Swiss city of Winterthur. It is district number 1, thus mainly comprising the original city.

The district comprises the quarters Altstadt, Lind, Heiligberg, Tössfeld, Brühlberg and Neuwiesen.
