= Willy Bretscher =

Willy Bretscher (1897 in Winterthur – 1992) was a Swiss newspaper writer and editor.

Bretscher began his career as a secretary with the Neues Winterthurer Tagblatt, subsequently having his work taken up by numerous publications. In 1917 he took a position with the Neue Zürcher Zeitung, becoming in 1925 its Berlin correspondent. Bretscher voiced a strong dislike for Socialism, finding it too close to Communism, and in his position was able to witness firsthand the troubles of the Weimar Republic. He was made the Zeitung's editor-in-chief in 1933, holding the post until 1967. Bretscher aided in the early development of Liberal International; he died in 1992.

== Sources ==
- Liberal International
- Works by Willy Bretscher at Open Library
