= Punish (band) =

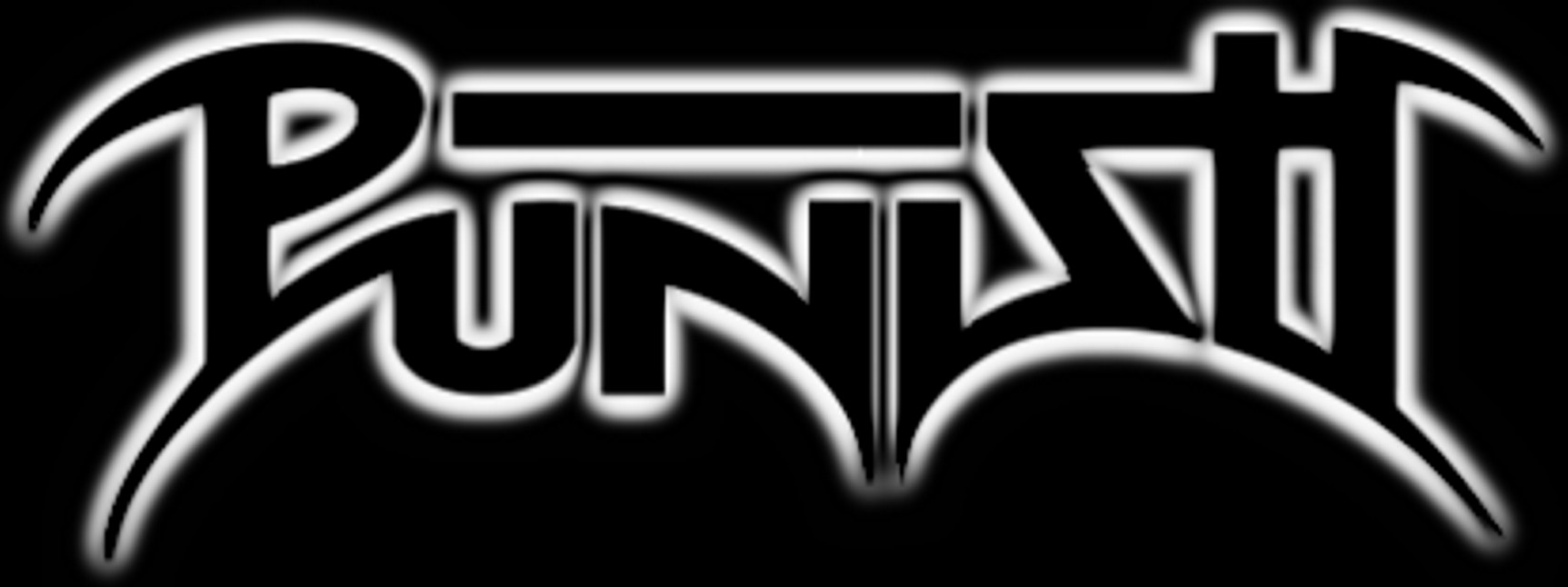
- Punish logo

Background information
- Origin: Winterthur, Switzerland
- Genres: Technical death metal
- Years active: 1996–present
- Members: André Mathieu; Oli Keller; Reto Crola; Monika Hagmann
- Past members: Chris Block; Mirko Siegwart; Reto Hardmeier; Ralph Huber
- Website: http://www.punish.ch/

Punish is a technical death metal band from Switzerland, formed in 1996. The band has shared the stage with international bands including: Artillery, Atheist, Belphegor, Cannibal Corpse, Destruction, Exhumed, Hour of Penance and Illdisposed.

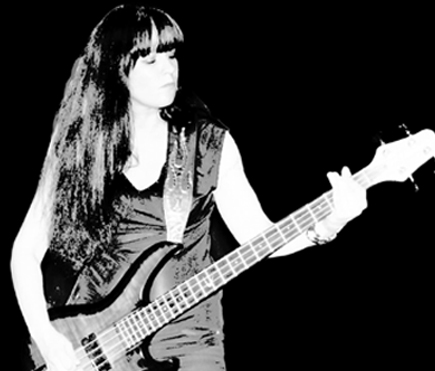
Monika Hagmann

== History ==
The band was formed in 1996 by André Mathieu, guitarist Ralph Huber and bass player Reto Hardmeier. In 1998 drummer Reto Crola and singer Chris Block completed the lineup. Together, they composed their first song, the result of which was their self-titled debut album released in 2000.

In 2001 Mirko Siegwart became their new bass player. The MCD Three Songs of Mental Disorder was released in 2004, followed by the EP Four Songs In Morbid Lust, a year later. Both records were recorded at Mastersound Studio in Germany. In 2005, Hardmeier rejoined the band.

When Block left in 2006, Reto and Mathieu took over vocals. That year the band toured Europe together with Helheim. The band's second album, Dawn of the Martyr, appeared in 2007. In 2008 they played together with Nocturnus on another European tour. Their third album Raptus was released in 2009. In 2012 Mathieu took over all vocal parts, abandoning the Two-Voice-Concept. In 2013 Punish released their fourth album Sublunar Chaos, via Apostasy Records and Monika Hagmann became the band's new bass player.

In 2016 Punish announced on their website that guitar player Ralph Huber left the band and has been replaced by Oli Keller.

== Style ==
Punish plays ambitious technical death metal, where the guitar parts are partly reminiscent on those of Death.

== Discography ==
=== Albums ===
- Punish (2000, DIY)
- Dawn of the Martyr (2007, Quam Libet Records)
- Raptus (2009, Stonepath Records)
- Sublunar Chaos (2013, Apostasy Records)
- PANIK (2016)

=== EPs ===
- Four Songs In Morbid Lust (2005, DIY)

=== Demos ===
- Three Songs of Mental Disorder (2004, DIY)
