= Neue Zürcher Zeitung =

German-language daily newspaper

Coordinates: 47.388°N 8.521°E

- Type: Daily newspaper
- Format: Swiss
- Owner: NZZ Mediengruppe
- Founder: Salomon Gessner
- President: Felix Graf
- Editor-in-chief: Eric Gujer
- Founded: 12 January 1780; 246 years ago
- Political alignment: Classical liberalism Centre-right; Liberal democracy
- Language: German
- Headquarters: Zürich
- Country: Switzerland
- Circulation: 108,709 (including e-paper, 2014)
- Readership: 0.253 Mio.
- ISSN: 0376-6829
- OCLC number: 698049952
- Website: nzz.ch (in German)

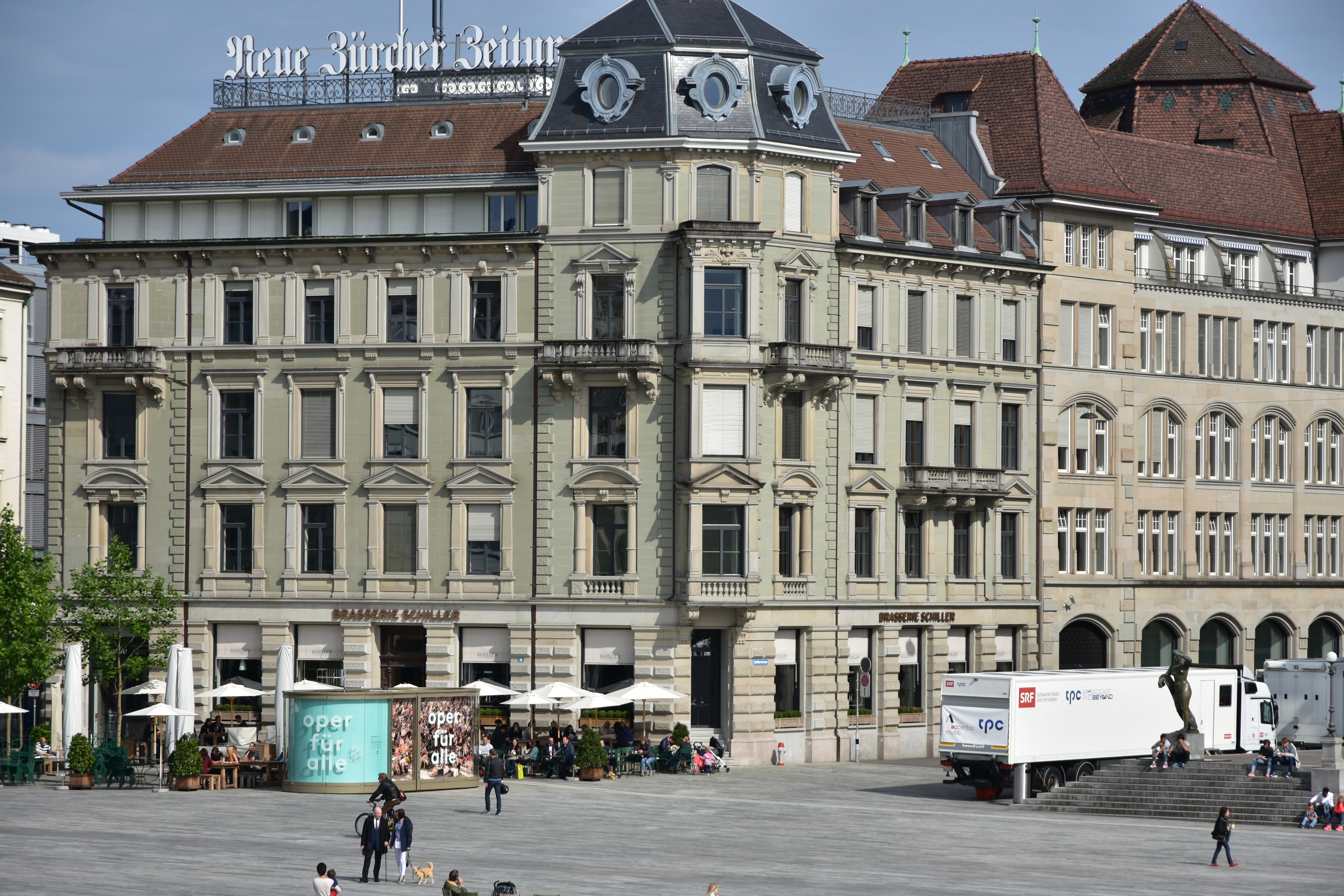
Head office in Zurich, as seen from Sechseläutenplatz

The Neue Zürcher Zeitung (NZZ; "New Newspaper of Zurich") is a German-language daily newspaper, published by NZZ Mediengruppe in Zurich, Switzerland. It was founded in 1780. The Neue Zürcher Zeitung is considered the Swiss newspaper of record published in German and historically liberal and right-leaning in political terms.

== History and profile ==
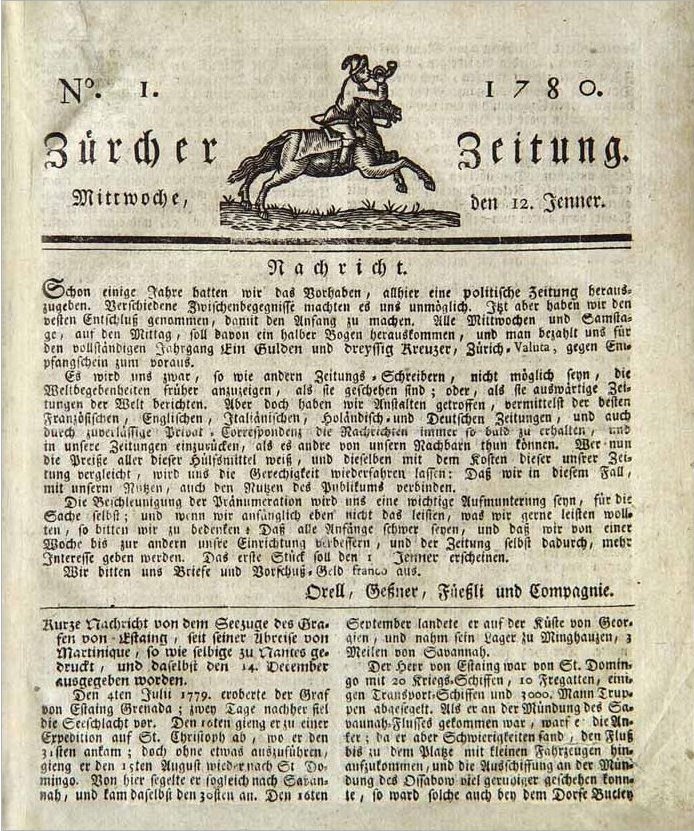
Zürcher Zeitung, no. 1 (1780)

One of the oldest newspapers still published, it originally appeared as Zürcher Zeitung, edited by the Swiss painter and poet Salomon Gessner, on 12 January 1780. It was renamed Neue Zürcher Zeitung in 1821.

According to Peter K. Buse and Jürgen C. Doerr, many prestigious German language newspapers followed its example because it set "standards through an objective, in-depth treatment of subject matter, eloquent commentary, an extensive section on entertainment, and one on advertising."

Aside from the switch from its blackletter typeface in 1946, the newspaper has changed little since the 1930s. Only in 2005 did it add color pictures, much later than most mainstream papers. The emphasis is on international news, business, finance, and high culture. Features and lifestyle stories are kept to a minimum.

Historically, the newspaper has been politically positioned close to the liberal Free Democratic Party of Switzerland since its early period. The paper's official statutes and guidelines declare it to have a "liberal democratic foundation". Accordingly, it has traditionally adopted a free-market liberal and centre-right orientation. However, in 2014, Markus Somm (formerly an editor at the Basler Zeitung), a more pronounced right-wing journalist, was slated to became editor-in-chief, leading to fears by staff of a rightward shift, resulting in internal protest. The internal upheaval eventually lead to Somm not taking on his role. However, the appointment of Eric Gujer as editor-in-chief in 2015 and René Scheu as head of the feature section in 2016, as well as almost half of all contributing editors leaving the newspaper between 2015 and December 2017, marked a noticeable shift to the right, according to critics.

In their analysis, Linards Udris and fellows of the University of Zurich ranked the Neue Zürcher Zeitung in a dominant position in their media quality yearbook.

== Circulation ==
The circulation of Neue Zürcher Zeitung was 18,100 copies in 1910. It rose to 47,500 copies in 1930 and 66,600 copies in 1950.

In 1997, the Neue Zürcher Zeitung had a circulation of 162,330 copies. Its circulation was 169,000 copies in 2000. The circulation of the paper was 166,000 copies in 2003. The 2006 circulation of the paper was 146,729 copies. Its circulation was 139,732 copies in 2009. In 2010, the paper had a circulation of 136,894 copies.

=== Weekend edition ===
In 2002, the newspaper launched a weekend edition, NZZ am Sonntag (NZZ on Sunday). The weekend edition has its own editorial staff and contains more soft news and lifestyle issues than its weekday counterpart, as do most Swiss weekend newspapers. Its circulation was 121,204 copies in 2006.

NZZ am Sonntag was awarded the European Newspaper of the Year in the category of weekly newspaper by the European Newspapers Congress in 2012.

=== Archives ===
In 2005, the complete run of the newspaper's first 225 years was scanned from microfilm. A total of two million images comprising seventy terabytes, and its Blackletter type was scanned – using optical character recognition – at a total cost of €600,000 (or €0.30 per image). The result is a searchable digital archive, accessible online by subscribers and publicly on site in Zurich.

The digitization was carried out by an institute of the German research organization Fraunhofer Society – the Institute for Media Communication (since 2006, the Fraunhofer Institute for Intelligent Analysis and Information Systems), headquartered in Sankt Augustin, North Rhine-Westphalia.

== Editors-in-chief ==
- 1821 – 1830: Paul Usteri
- 1830 – 1849: 10 different editor-in-chiefs
- 1849 – 1867: Peter Jakob Felber
- 1868 – 1872: Eugen Escher
- 1872 – 1876: Hans Weber
- 1876 – 1877: Eugen Huber
- 1877 – 1878: Gottwalt Niederer
- 1878 – 1884: Gustav Vogt
- 1885 – 1915: Walter Bissegger
- 1915 – 1929: Albert Meyer
- 1933 – 1968: Willy Bretscher
- 1968 – 1985: Fred Luchsinger
- 1985 – 2006: Hugo Bütler
- 2006 – 2014: Markus Spillmann
- Since 2015: Eric Gujer

== NZZ Libro ==
NZZ Libro is the book publishing part of the Neue Zürcher Zeitung (NZZ). Books have been published since 1927; since 1980, the publishing house has been run as a separate profit centre. Since 2006 the publishing house has operated under the name NZZ Libro. The publishing programme of specialist and non-fiction literature includes, among other things, political, cultural, historical, and economic books, as well as biographies and illustrated books, predominantly with a Swiss reference.

== Award ==
The Neue Zürcher Zeitung was a co-recipient of the 1979 Erasmus Prize, alongside German newspaper Die Zeit.

== See also ==
- Le Temps, the French-language Swiss newspaper of record
