= International School Winterthur =

Defunct school in Winterthur, Switzerland

Coordinates: 47.5069°N 8.7655°E

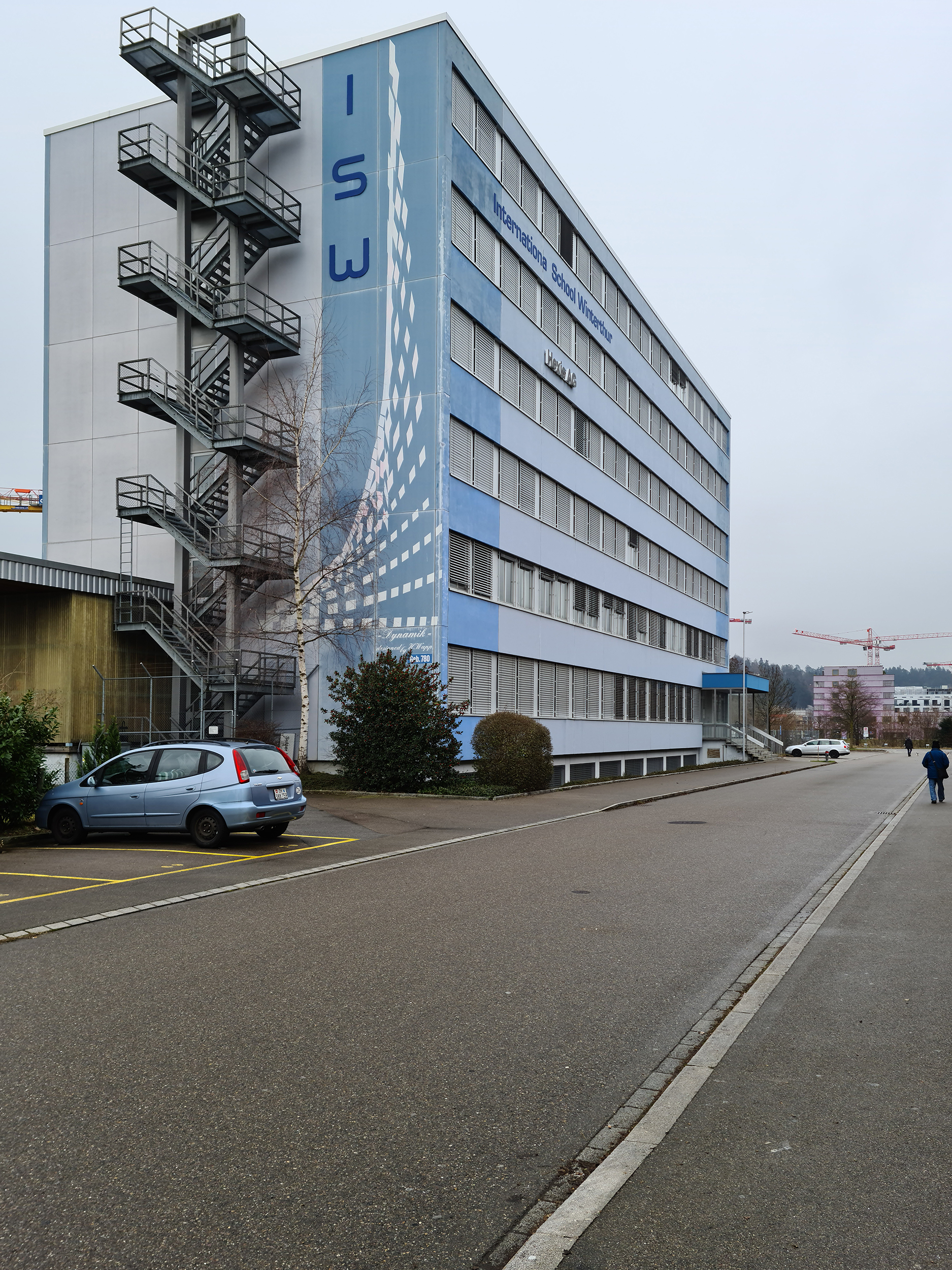

Information
- Established: 2001
- Closed: 2015
- Age: 3 to 18

International School Winterthur (ISW) was an international school in Winterthur, Switzerland, serving ages 3 through 18. It was established in 2001, but closed suddenly on 22 May 2015 after declaring insolvency.

ISW's Kindergarten and primary education programs (Primary Years Programms and part of Middle Years Programm) were approved by the bureau for elementary school (Volksschulamt), administration for education (Bildungsdirektion), canton of Zurich.

ISW's lower secondary education program (the higher part of the Middle Years Programm) was also approved as Sekundarstufe by the bureau for elementary school (Volksschulamt), administration for education (Bildungsdirektion), canton of Zurich.

However ISW's upper secondary education programs (Diploma Program and International Matura) were not approved as a Mittelschule by the bureau for gymnasial and vocational education (Mittelschul- und Berufsbildungsamt), administration of education (Bildungsdirektion), canton of Zurich, and as well not approved by the Swiss Federal State Secretariat for Education, Research and Innovation SERI.
