= Winterthur =

City in the canton of Zurich, Switzerland

- Municipality
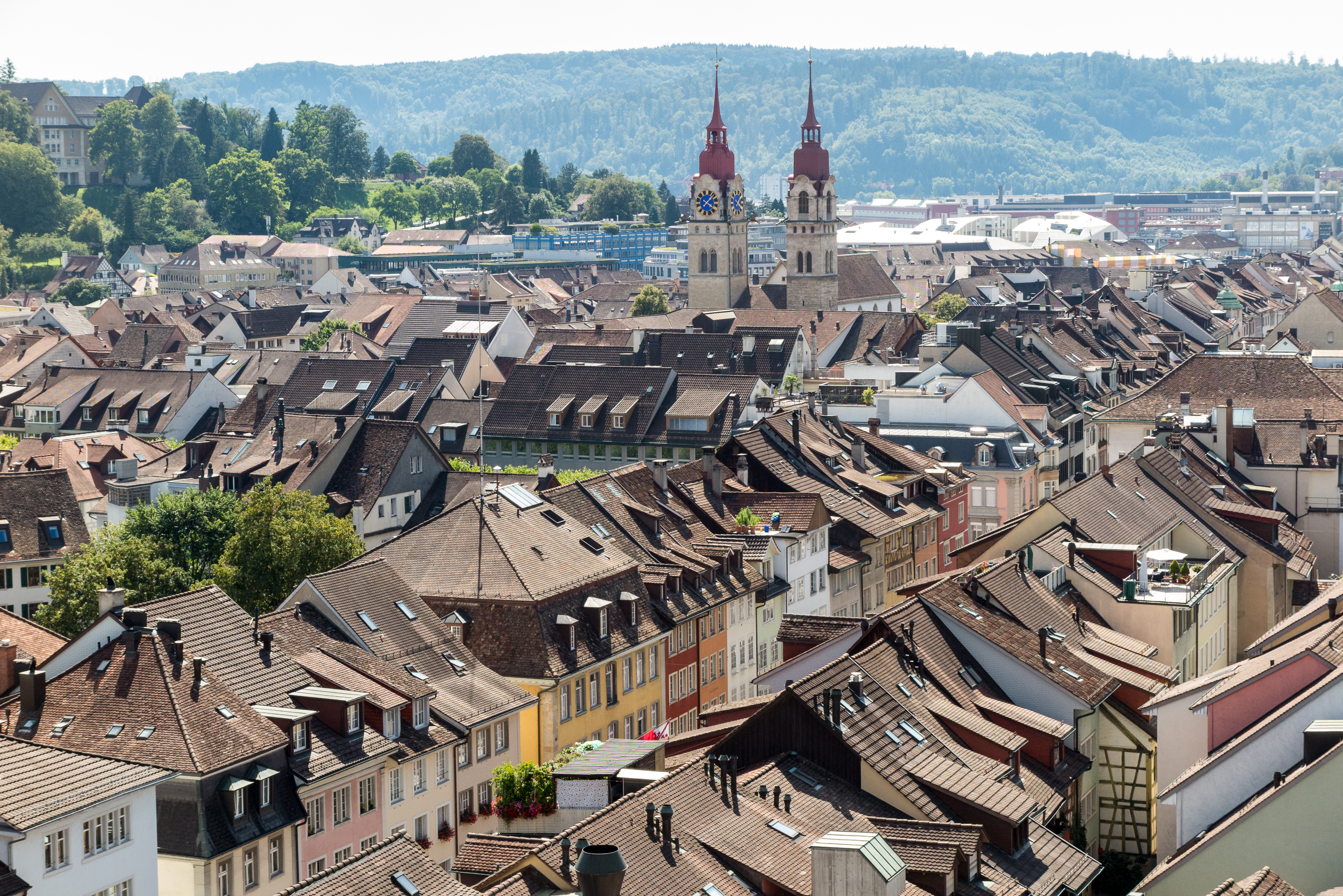
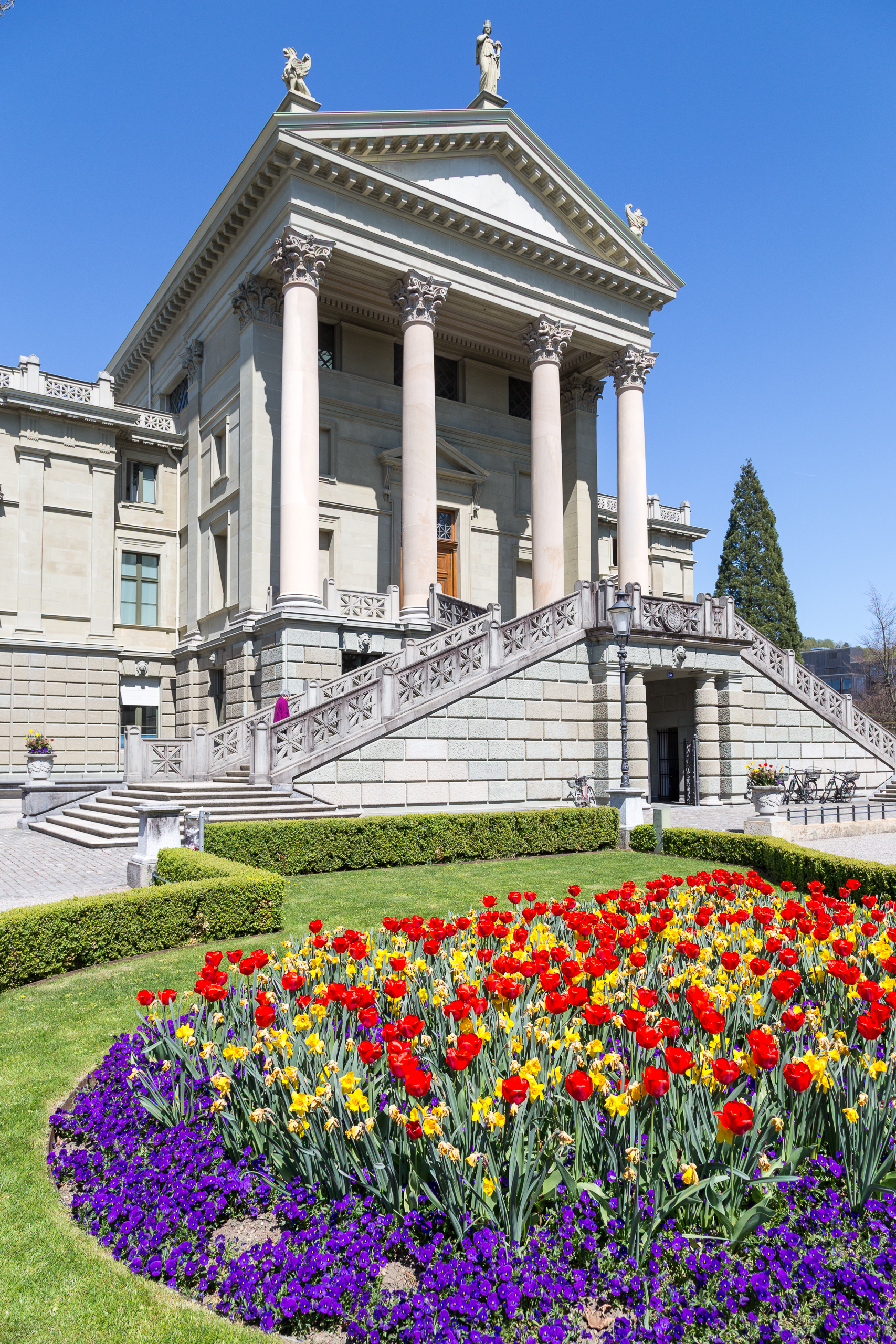
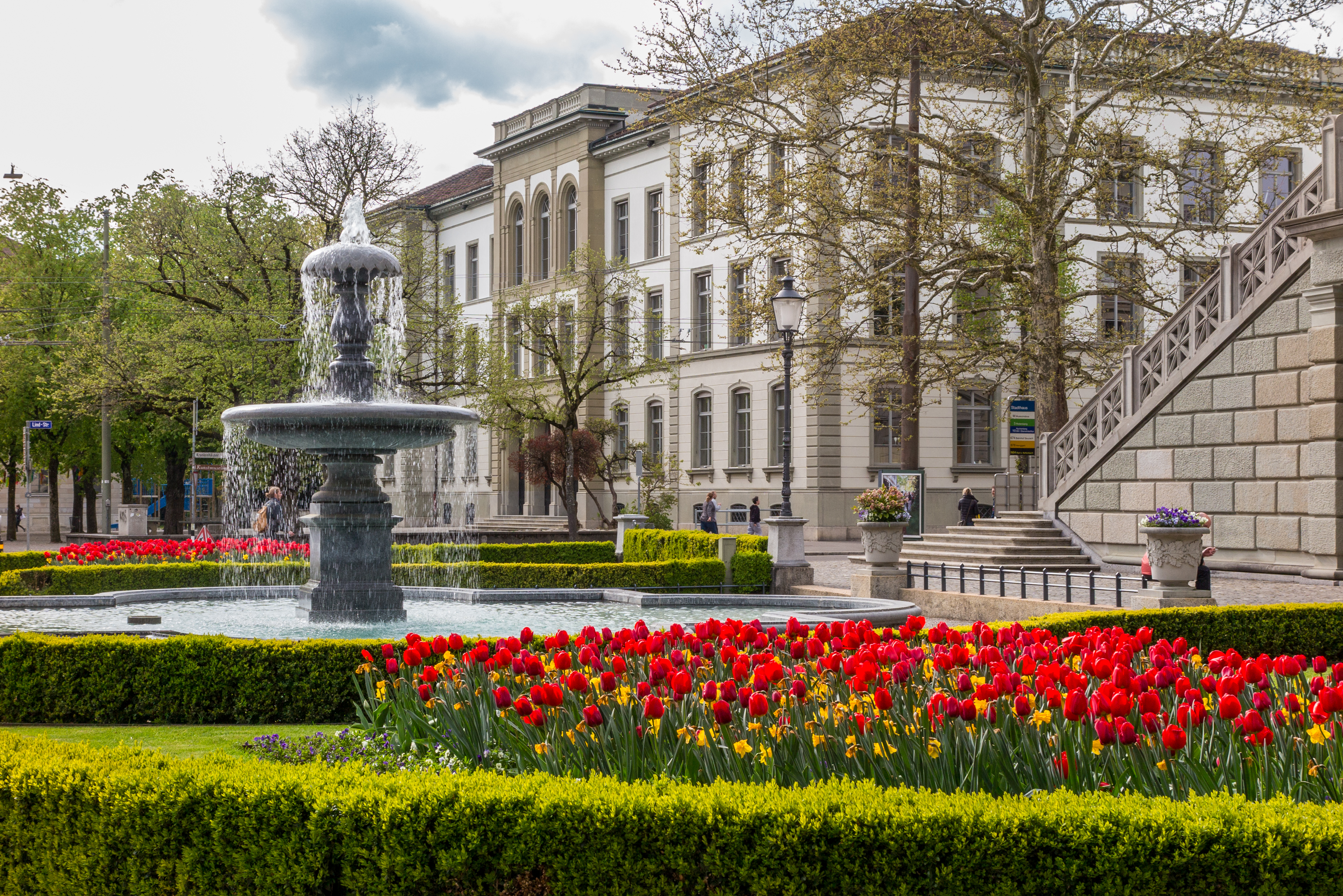
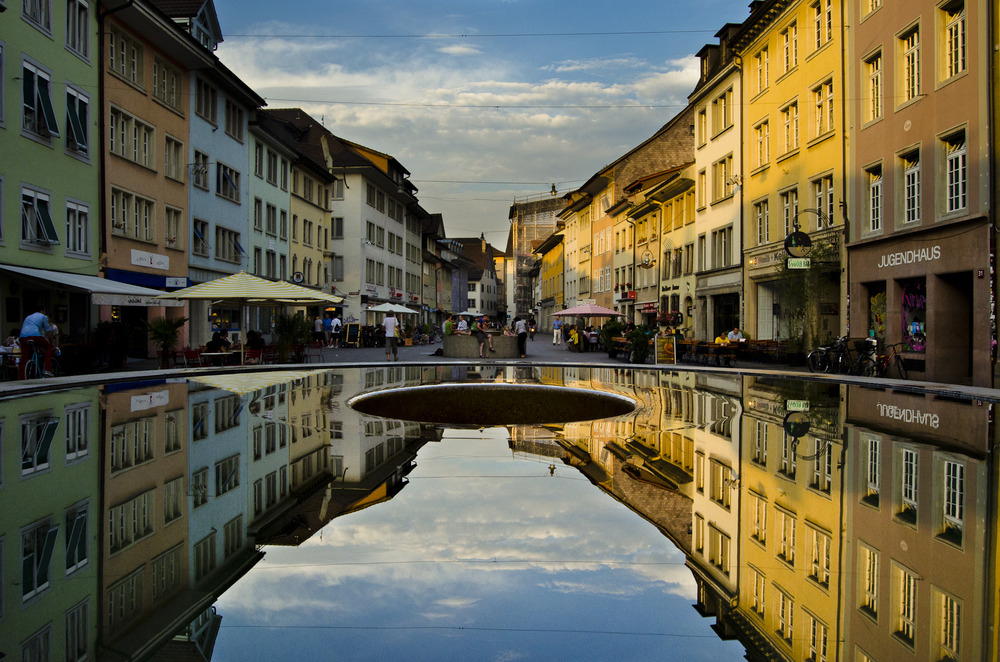
- Clockwise from top: old town with Stadtkirche, Stadthaus fountain and Altstadtschulhaus, Steinberggasse in the old town, Stadthaus

- Flag Coat of arms
- Location of Winterthur
- Location within Switzerland Location within Canton of Zurich
- Coordinates: 47°29′56″N 8°43′43″E
- Country: Switzerland
- Canton: Zurich
- District: Winterthur

Government
  - Executive: Stadtrat with 7 members
  - Mayor: Stadtpräsident (list); Stefan Fritschi FDP/PRD (as of 2026)
  - Parliament: Grosser Gemeinderat with 60 members

Area
  - Total: 68.07 km^{2} (26.28 sq mi)
- Elevation (Bahnhofplatz): 439 m (1,440 ft)
- Highest elevation (Hulmen): 687 m (2,254 ft)
- Lowest elevation (Kläranlage Hard): 393 m (1,289 ft)

Population (December 2020)
  - Total: 114,220
  - Density: 1,678/km^{2} (4,346/sq mi)
- Demonym: German: Winterthurer(in)
- Time zone: UTC+01:00 (CET)
  - Summer (DST): UTC+02:00 (CEST)
- Postal codes: 8400, 8404, 8405, 8406, 8408, 8409, 8404 Stadel (Winterthur), 8404 Reutlingen (Winterthur), 8310 Kempthal, 8352 Ricketwil (Winterthur), 8482 Sennhof (Winterthur), 8542 Wiesendangen, 8545 Rickenbach Sulz
- SFOS number: 230
- ISO 3166 code: CH-ZH
- Localities: Stadt (city), Dättnau, Deutweg, Ganzenbühl, Grüze, Hegi, Heiligberg, Mattenbach, Oberseen, Oberwinterthur, Rosenberg, Schlosstal, Seen, Töss, Veltheim, Wülflingen, Zinzikon
- Surrounded by: Brütten, Dinhard, Elsau, Hettlingen, Illnau-Effretikon, Kyburg, Lindau, Neftenbach, Oberembrach, Pfungen, Rickenbach, Schlatt, Seuzach, Wiesendangen, Zell
- Twin towns: Hall in Tirol (Austria), La Chaux-de-Fonds (Switzerland), Plzeň (Czech Republic), Yverdon-les-Bains (Switzerland)
- Website: stadt.winterthur.ch

Winterthur (Swiss Standard German pronunciation: [ˈvɪntərtuːr]; French: Winterthour [vintəʁtuʁ, vintɛʁ-]) is a city and municipality in the canton of Zurich in northern Switzerland. With over 120,000 residents, it is the country's sixth-largest city by population, as well as its ninth-largest agglomeration with about 140,000 inhabitants. Located about 20 kilometres (12 mi) northeast of Zurich, Winterthur is a service and high-tech industrial satellite city within Zurich Metropolitan Area. Winterthur is usually abbreviated as Winti in the local dialect.

Winterthur is connected to Germany by direct trains and has links to Zurich Airport. It is also a regional transport hub: the A1 motorway from Geneva through to St. Margrethen connects in Winterthur with the A4 motorway heading north toward Schaffhausen and the A7 motorway heading close to the Swiss-German border at Kreuzlingen. There are also roads leading to other places such as Turbenthal. The railway station is the fourth busiest railway station in Switzerland, and is 20 minutes away by train from Zurich.

== History ==
Vitudurum was a vicus in what is now Oberwinterthur during the Roman era (first century BC to third century AD). It was fortified into a castrum at the end of the third century, apparently in reaction to the incipient Alamannic invasion.

There was an Alamannic settlement on the site in the seventh century.

In a battle near Winterthur in 919, Burchard II of Swabia asserted his control over the Thurgau within the Duchy of Swabia against the claims of Rudolph II of Burgundy.

The counts of Winterthur, a cadet branch of the family of the counts of Bregenz, built Kyburg castle in the tenth century. With the extinction of the counts of Winterthur in 1053, the castle passed to the counts of Dillingen. Winterthur as a city (presumably on the site of a pre-existing village) was founded by Hartmann III of Dillingen in 1180, shortly before his death in the same year. From 1180 to 1263, Winterthur was ruled by the cadet line of the House of Kyburg.

When the counts of Kyburg became extinct in the male line in 1263, Winterthur passed to the House of Habsburg, who established a comital line of Neu-Kyburg in 1264 and granted city rights to Winterthur in the same year. From 1415 until 1442 Winterthur was reichsfrei (subject only to the Holy Roman Emperor). However, in the Old Zürich War they lost this freedom and came back under the control of the Austrian Habsburgs. Needing money, in 1467, the Habsburgs sold Winterthur to the city of Zurich.

While it was under the leadership of Zurich, Winterthur's economic freedom was restricted. It lost many of its market rights and the right to trade in some goods. This ended in 1798, when Napoleonic troops took the town. On 27 May 1799, it was the site of the Battle of Winterthur between elements of the French Army of the Danube and elements of the Habsburg army, commanded by Friedrich, Baron von Hotze during the War of the Second Coalition, in the French Revolutionary Wars. Because Winterthur lies near Zurich and at the junction of seven roads, the army that held the town held the access to most of Switzerland and points crossing the Rhine into southern Germany. Although the forces involved were small, the ability of the Austrians to sustain an 11-hour assault against the French line, on the plateau north of Zurich, resulted in the consolidation of three Austrian forces. This led to the French defeat a few days later.

In the 19th century, Winterthur became an industrial town when companies, like Sulzer, Rieter and SLM, built large industrial plants. Winterthur suffered severely from its investments in and guarantee of loans to the National Railway of Switzerland (a private enterprise). In 1878, Winterthur had to sell its shares in the line, and from 1881 to 1885 it was in great difficulties due to a loan of nine million francs guaranteed in 1874 by the town, together with three others in Aargau, to the enterprise. As the three co-guarantor towns were unable to pay their shares, the whole burden fell on Winterthur, which struggled to meet its liabilities. But it was assisted by large loans from the cantonal and federal governments.

The Great Depression, in the 1930s, hit Winterthur extremely hard. Sixty percent of the total employees in town worked in the machine industry. Jobs became extremely hard to find. However, with the outbreak of World War II, industry grew again in the city.

In 2008, Winterthur reached 100,000 inhabitants.

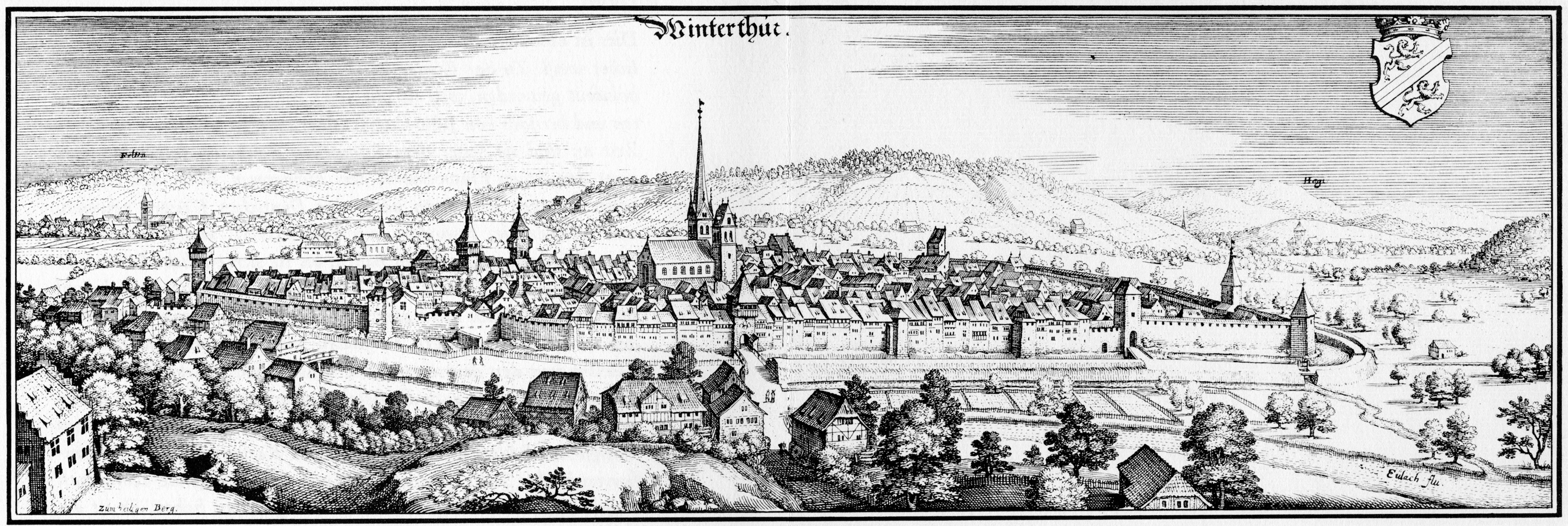
The town in 1642

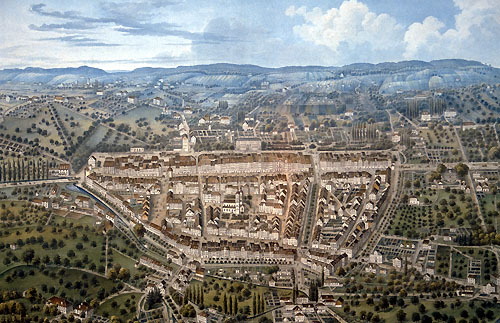
Early-1850s bird's-eye view.

Aerial view in 1958

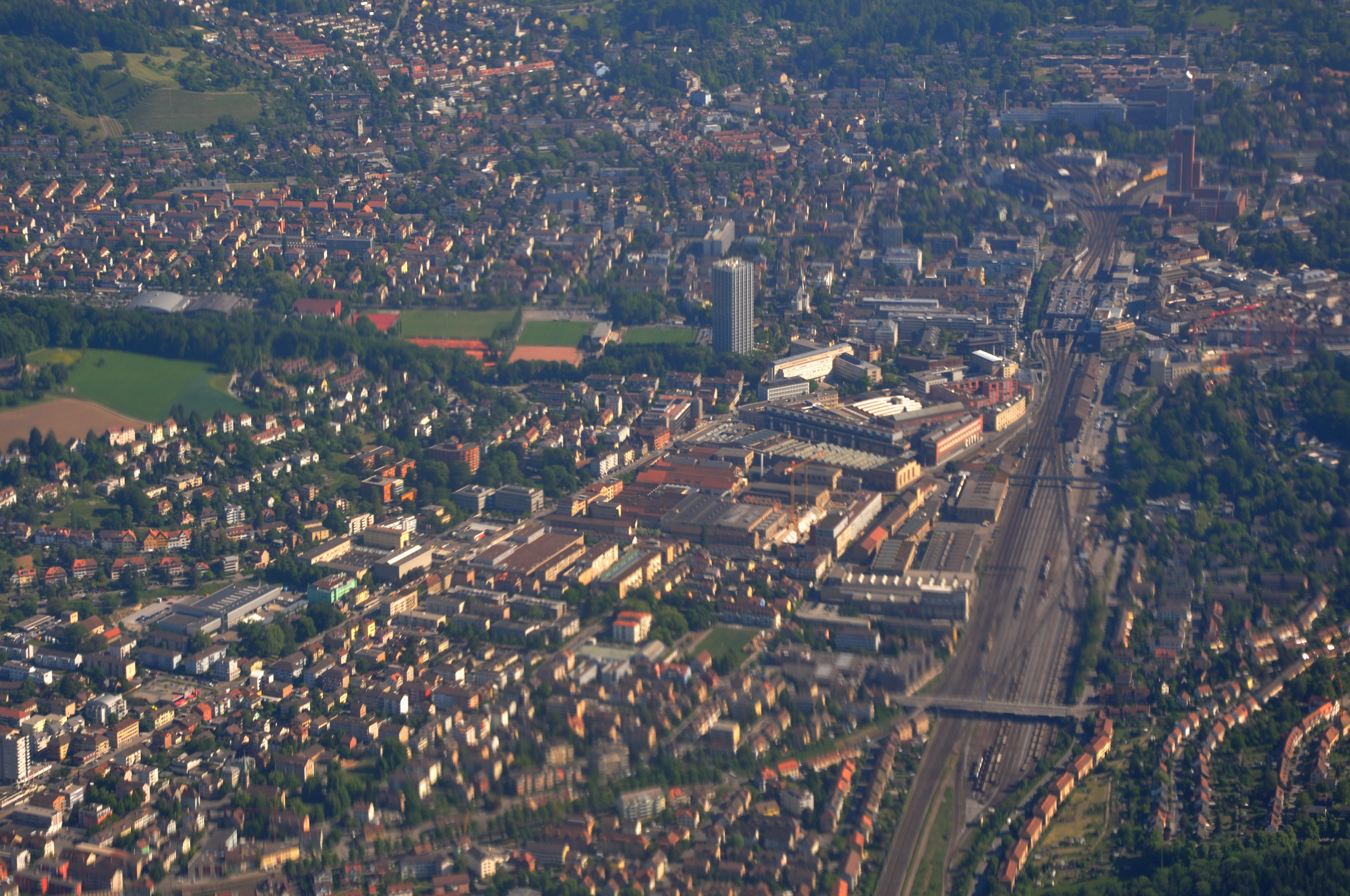
Aerial view in May 2011

== Geography ==
=== Topography ===
Winterthur is located at an elevation of 439 meters (1,440 ft). The city is located in a basin south and east of the river Töss before it meets the High Rhine after 10 kilometers. The Eulach, a small river, flows from the town's east end through the middle of the town to meet the Töss at the west exit of the city. Because of this the town is colloquially also called "Eulachstadt". Zurich lies about 20 km (12 mi) southwest of Winterthur.

=== Area ===
As of 2004-2009, Winterthur has an area of 68.1 km^{2} (26.3 sq mi); 24.8% is used for agricultural purposes, 40.4% is forested, 33.6% is settled (buildings or roads) and 1.1% is non-productive (rivers, glaciers or mountains). In 1996 housing and buildings made up 21.9% of the total area, while transportation infrastructure made up the rest (9%). Of the total unproductive area, water (streams and lakes) made up 0.6% of the area. As of 2007, 27.6% of the total municipal area was undergoing some type of construction.

== Politics ==
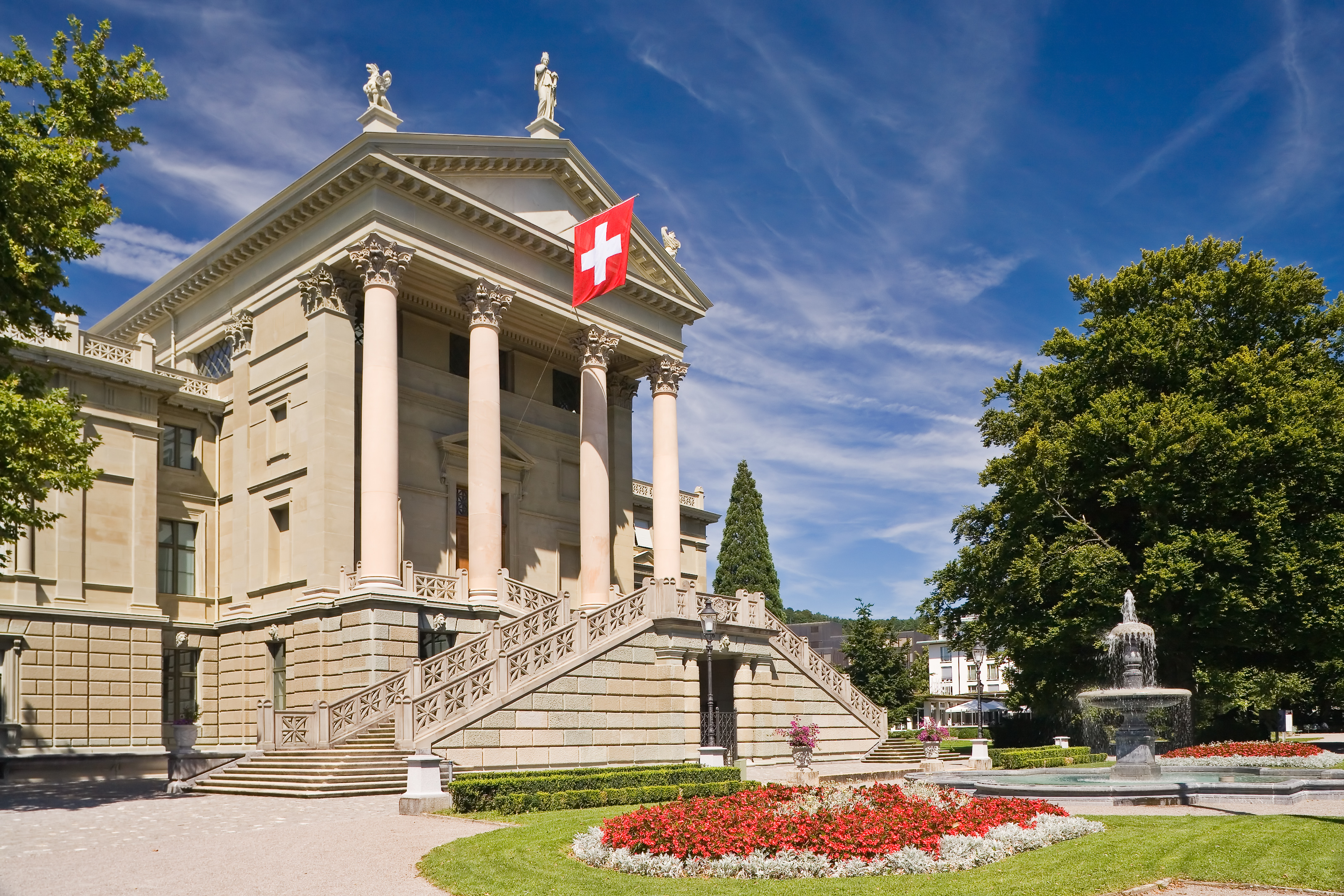
City hall, designed by architect Gottfried Semper

=== Subdivisions ===
Winterthur has seven city districts (German: Stadtkreise): 1 – Stadt, 2 – Oberwinterthur, 3 – Seen, 4 – Töss, 5 – Veltheim, 6 – Wülflingen, 7 – Mattenbach

=== Government ===
The City Council (Stadtrat) constitutes the executive government of the City of Winterthur and operates as a collegiate authority. It is composed of seven councilors (German: Stadtrat/ Stadträtin), each presiding over a department. Departmental tasks, coordination measures and implementation of laws decreed by the Large Municipal Council are carried by the City Council. In the mandate period 2018–2022 (Legislatur) the City Council is presided by Stadtpräsident Michael Künzle. The regular election of the City Council by any inhabitant valid to vote is held every four years. Any resident of Winterthur allowed to vote can be elected as a member of the City Council. The mayor is elected as such by public election by means of a system of Majorz, while the heads of the other directorates are assigned by the collegiate. The delegates are elected by means of a system of Majorz.

As of 2018, Winterthur's City Council is made up of three representatives of the SP (Social Democratic Party), one member of the FDP (FDP.The Liberals), one of the GPS (Green Party), one of the GLP (Green Liberal Party), and one of the CVP (Christian Democratic People's Party, who is also the mayor), giving the left parties a combined four out of seven seats. The last regular election was held on 5 March and 15 April 2018, the last special election on 23 August 2020.

Stadtrat of Winterthur
City Councillor (Stadtrat/ Stadträtin)	Party	Department head of	elected since
Michael Künzle (Note: Mayor (Stadtpräsident))	CVP	Culture and Administration (Kulturelles und Dienste, 2012)	2012
Christa Meier (Note: Vice Mayor (Vizepräsidentin))	SP	Civil Engineering and Construction (Bau, 2018)	2018
Kaspar Bopp	SP	Finances (Finanzen, Oct 2019)	2019
Stefan Fritschi	FDP	Industrial Facilities (Technische Betriebe, 2017)	2010
Nicolas Galladé	SP	Social Services (Soziales, 2010)	2010
Jürg Altweg	GPS	Education and Sport (Schule und Sport, 2017)	2017
Katrin Cometta	GLP	Security and Environment (Sicherheit und Umwelt, 2020)	2020

Ansgar Simon is Town Chancellor (Stadtschreiber) since 2016 and Marcel Wendelspiess is Legal Counsel (Rechtskonsulent) since 2013 for the City Council.

=== Parliament ===
The Grosse Gemeinderat of Winterthur for the mandate period of 2018–2022
1. AL (3.30%)
2. Piraten (1.70%)
3. SP (30.0%)
4. GPS (8.30%)
5. glp (11.7%)
6. EVP (6.70%)
7. CVP (5.00%)
8. FDP (13.3%)
9. BDP (1.70%)
10. SVP (16.7%)
11. EDU (1.70%)

The Large Municipal Council (Grosser Gemeinderat) holds legislative power. It is made up of 60 members, with elections held every four years. The Large Municipal Council decrees regulations and by-laws that are executed by the City Council and the administration. The delegates are selected by means of a system of proportional representation (Proporz).

The sessions of the Large Municipal Council are public. Unlike members of the City Council, members of the Large Municipal Council are not politicians by profession, and they are paid a fee based on their attendance. Any resident of Winterthur allowed to vote can be elected as a member of the Large Municipal Council. The parliament holds its meetings in the Rathaus once a month on Mondays.

The last regular election of the Large Municipal Council was held on 8 March 2018 for the mandate period (German: Legislatur) from May 2018 to April 2022. Currently the Large Municipal Council consists of 18 members of the Social Democratic Party (SP/PS), 10 Swiss People's Party (SVP/UDC), 8 The Liberals (FDP/PLR), 7 Green Liberal Party (GLP/PVL), 5 Green Party (GPS/PES), 4 Evangelical People's Party (EVP), 3 Christian Democratic People's Party (CVP/PDC), 2 Alternative List (AL), one representative each of the Conservative Democratic Party (BDP/PBD), Federal Democratic Union (EDU/UDF), and the Pirate Party.

=== National elections ===
==== National Council ====
In the 2019 federal election for the Swiss National Council the most popular party was the PS which received 22.6% (−3.4) of the vote. The next six most popular parties were the SVP (17.8%, -5.6), the Green Party (17.8%, +9), the glp (14.3%, +5.5), FDP (10.6%, -1.5), the EVP (5.0%, 0), and the CVP (4.2%, +0.2). In the federal election a total of 32,907 votes were cast, and the voter turnout was 47.0%.

In the 2015 election for the Swiss National Council the most popular party was the SPS which received 26.1% of the vote. The next most popular parties were the SVP (23.4%), the FDP (12.1%), the Green Party (8.8%), the glp (8.8%), the EVP (5.0%), the CVP (4.0%), and BDP (3.5%). In the federal election, a total of 33,426 voters were cast, and the voter turnout was 49.3%. In the 2011, federal election the most popular party was the SP which received 22.5% of the vote. The next three most popular parties were the SVP (21.8%), the Green Liberals (11.1%) and the Green Party (10.1%).

=== International relations ===
==== Twin towns ====
Winterthur is twinned with two Swiss and two international towns and coordinates its international relations together with the Swiss towns Frauenfeld, St. Gallen, and Schaffhausen:

- Yverdon-les-Bains, Switzerland
- La Chaux-de-Fonds, Switzerland
- Plzeň, Czech Republic
- Hall in Tirol, Austria

==== Namesake ====
The community of Winterthur in Delaware, US, is named after the city.

== Demographics ==
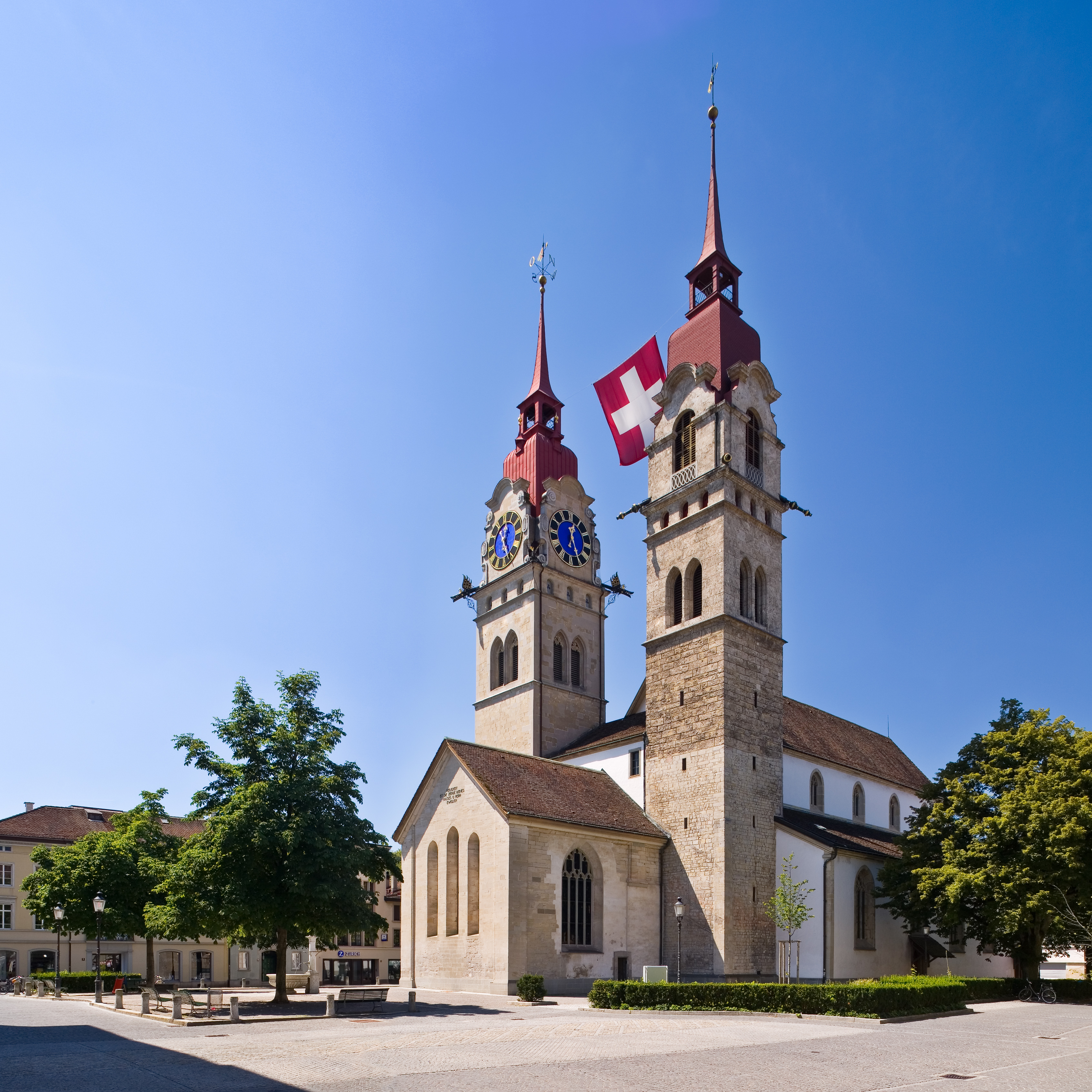
The city church of Winterthur, a local landmark

Significant minority groups
Nationality	Population (2015)
Germany	4,942
Italy	4,577
North Macedonia	2,032
Turkey	1,849
Kosovo	1,439
Serbia	1,285
Portugal	1,049

Historical population
Year	Pop.	±%
1850	13,651	—
1860	15,613	+14.4%
1870	19,496	+24.9%
1880	25,924	+33.0%
1888	29,508	+13.8%
1900	40,961	+38.8%
1910	46,384	+13.2%
1920	49,969	+7.7%
1930	53,925	+7.9%
1941	58,883	+9.2%
1950	66,925	+13.7%
1960	80,352	+20.1%
1970	92,722	+15.4%
1980	86,758	−6.4%
1990	86,959	+0.2%
2000	90,483	+4.1%
2010	101,308	+12.0%
2020	114,220	+12.7%

As of July 2008 the population of Winterthur is 100,000. More recently (as of 31 December 2020) the population was 114,220. As of 2007 23.6% of the population was made up of foreign nationals. As of 2008 the gender distribution of the population was 48.6% male and 51.4% female. Over the last 10 years the population has grown at a rate of 10.4%. Most of the population (as of 2000) speaks German (83.0%), with Italian being second-most common (4.9%) and Albanian being third (2.0%).

The age distribution of the population (as of 2018) is children and teenagers (0–19 years old) make up 19.9% of the population, while adults (20–64 years old) make up 63.9% and seniors (over 64 years old) make up 16.2%. There are 42,028 households in Winterthur.

As of 2008 there were 37,327 members of the Swiss Reformed Church (37.1% of the population) and 26,995 Catholics (26.7% of the population) in Winterthur. Of the other Christian faiths, 326 (0.3%) were Lutheran, 203 (0.2%) were Christian Catholic, 3,141 (3.1%) are some type of Christian Orthodox and 3,132 (3.1%) are another Christian faith. Of the rest of the population, 11,608 (11.5%) were Muslim, 108 (0.1%) were Jewish, 1,359 (1.3%) belonged to another non-Christian faith and 16,779 (16.6%) were atheist or agnostic or did not belong to any organized faith.

== Economy ==
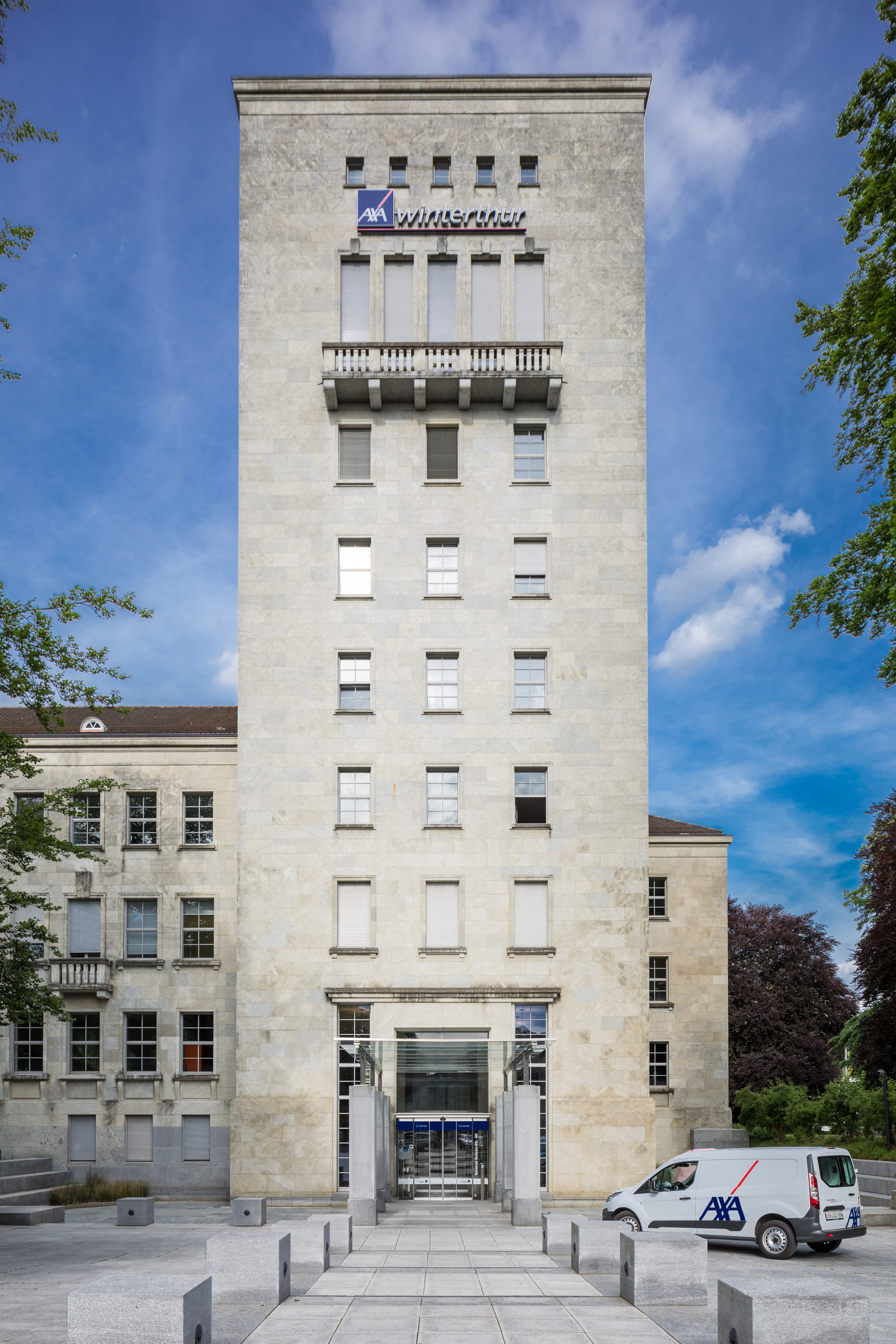
Axa Winterthur headquarters

Historically, Winterthur was one of the homes of Switzerland's rail industry and an industrial centre, however the rail industry and other heavy industry have mostly shut down. Amongst the most significant companies was Sulzer Brothers, today's Sulzer. Textile production declined even earlier on. The Rieter textile machinery company is based in Winterthur.

Switzerland's largest bank, and one of the world's large banks, Union Bank of Switzerland (UBS, since 1998 UBS AG), was founded in Winterthur.

The Landbote newspaper is situated in Winterthur, and also serves as Winterthurer Stadtanzeiger, the official publication organ of the city of Winterthur.

Peraves, the manufacturer of the fully enclosed "cabin motorcycle" named the Monotracer, predated by an earlier model named the Ecomobile, has been manufacturing these vehicles since the early 1980s. In 2010, Peraves won the Progressive Insurance Automotive X-Prize with an electric powered version of the Monotracer.

Among other commercial organizations, Winterthur was home to Switzerland's largest insurance business Winterthur Insurance. Until its acquisition, the company was the largest in Switzerland and was in Europe's top 10. On 1 January 2007 the Winterthur company was acquired by the French Axa group and is now known as AXA Winterthur.

As of 2011, Winterthur had an unemployment rate of 3.53%. As of 2017, there were 185 people employed in the primary economic sector and about 60 businesses involved in this sector; 11,880 people are employed in the secondary sector and there are 884 businesses in this sector; 59,767 people are employed in the tertiary sector, with 6,983 businesses in this sector. As of 2007 47.9% of the working population were employed full-time, and 52.1% were employed part-time.

== Education ==
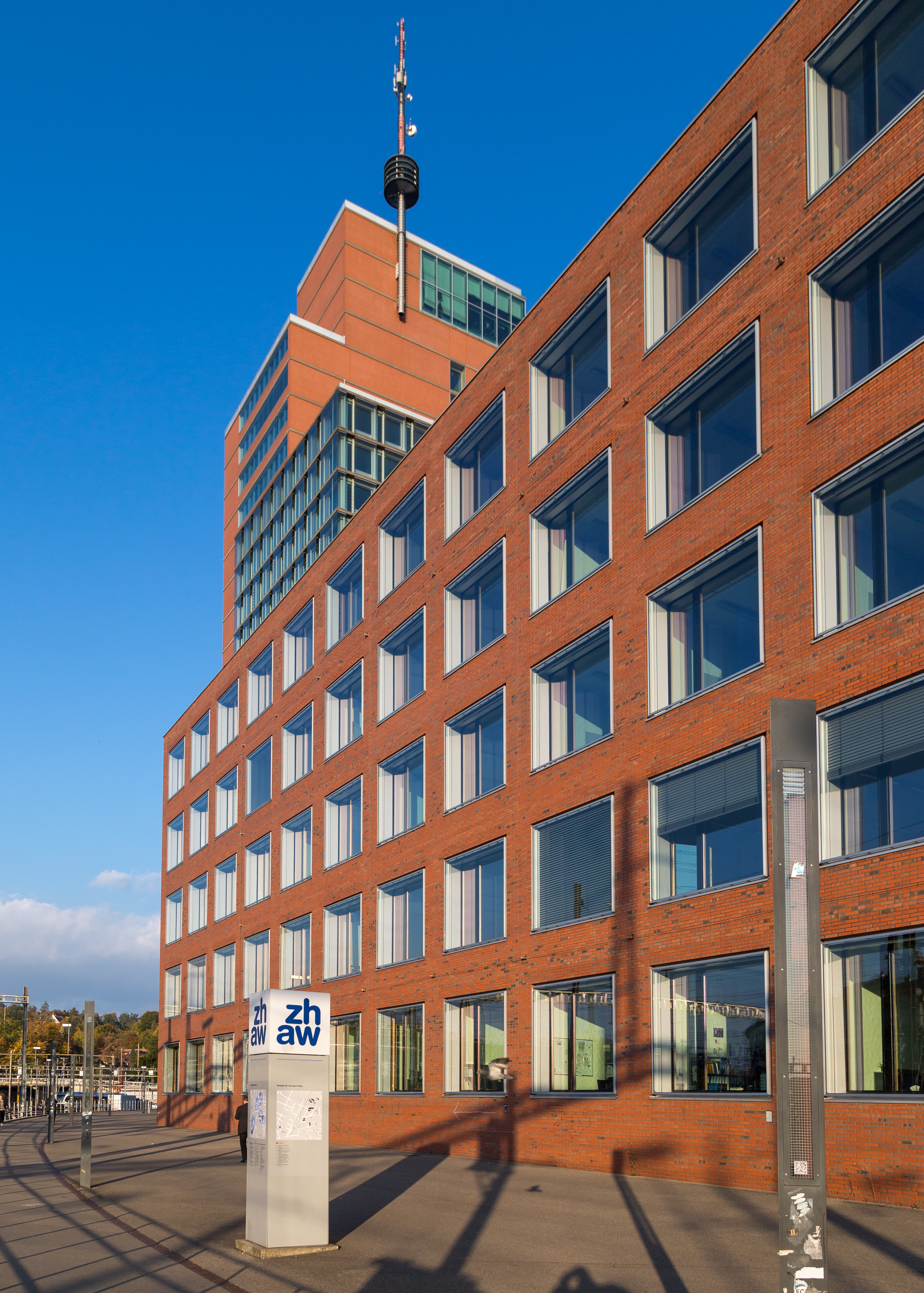
ZHAW Campus and Roter Turm

In Winterthur, about 70.7% of the population (between ages 25 and 64) have completed either non-mandatory upper secondary education or additional higher education (either university or a Fachhochschule).

The town is renowned for its institute of higher education Technikum, which is the largest school of technology in Switzerland. The institute has recently teamed up with schools from Zurich and is now known as Zürcher Hochschule für Angewandte Wissenschaften (ZHAW).

The headquarters of the Club of Rome are located in Winterthur.

SIS Swiss International School maintains a campus in Winterthur. International School Winterthur, formerly located in Winterthur, closed in 2015.

== Transport ==
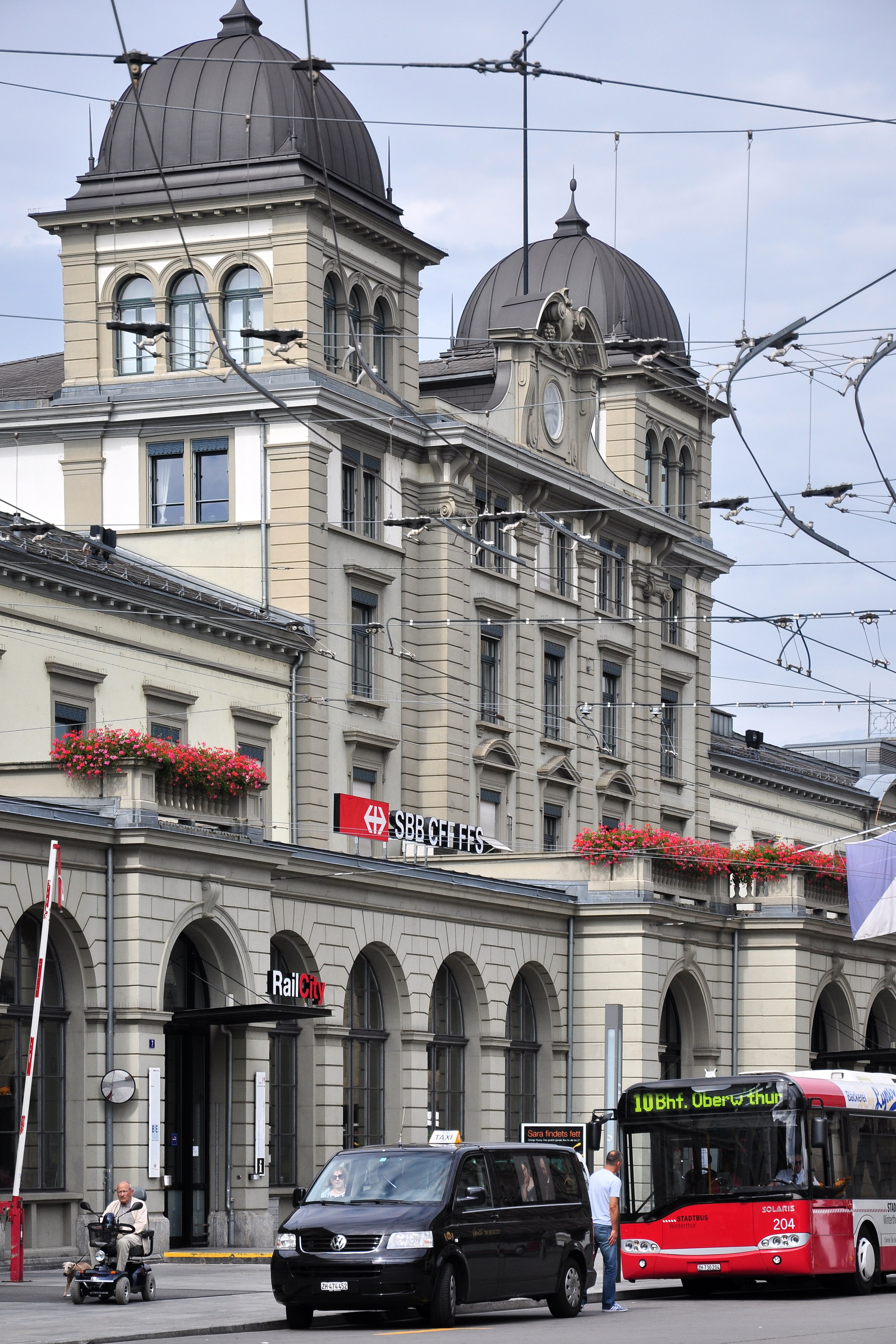
Winterthur railway station

Winterthur railway station (Bahnhof Winterthur), the city's principal railway station, is the fifth-busiest railway station on the Swiss Railway Network, with 110,900 passengers per day (as of 2023). As Winterthur is close to Zurich, there are frequent rail services between the two cities. Winterthur is served by trains of the regional Zurich S-Bahn network (operated by Zürcher Verkehrsverbund, ZVV), but also several long-distance services, both national and international, such as the EuroCity (EC) service to Munich, InterCity (IC) services to Geneva, Bern, St. Gallen and Romanshorn, and InterRegio (IR) services to Konstanz, St. Gallen, Chur and Lucerne.

Besides the main railway station (Hauptbahnhof), there are nine more within the city limits (ZVV fare zone 120), all of which are served by S-Bahn (S#) trains only (including some nighttime S-Bahn services, SN#):

- Oberwinterthur S11 S24 S29 S30 SN30
- Reutlingen S11 S29
- Sennhof-Kyburg S11 S26
- Winterthur Grüze S11 S12 S26 S35 SN21
- Winterthur Hegi S12 S35 SN21
- Winterthur Seen S11 S26
- Winterthur Töss S41 SN41
- Winterthur Wallrüti S11 S29
- Winterthur Wülflingen S41 SN41

The urban public transport is run by Stadtbus Winterthur with twelve town bus lines, including the Winterthur trolleybus system, and five regional bus lines (e.g. by PostAuto). Until 1951, there used to be trams in Winterthur.

There are two airports: Winterthur Hegmatten (LSPH) and Speck (LSZK).

Zurich Airport is located 22.9 km (14 mi) to the south west of the city. The airport provides most domestic and international destinations.

Winterthur is located along the A1 (Geneva–St. Margrethen) and A4 (Schaffhausen–Flüelen) motorways.

== Tourism ==
Nearby tourist attractions include the Kyburg Castle, Laufen Castle and the Rhine Falls. Besides its preserved old town, rich industrial history, villas and parks, Winterthur is mentioned in tourist guides for its numerous museums, many of which offer world-class art, among them of the Gottfried Keller-Stiftung. The most notable include:

- Oskar Reinhart Collection 'Am Römerholz'
- Oskar Reinhart Collection 'Am Stadtgarten'
- Kunstmuseum Winterthur
- Villa Flora
- Fotomuseum Winterthur
- Swiss Science Center Technorama
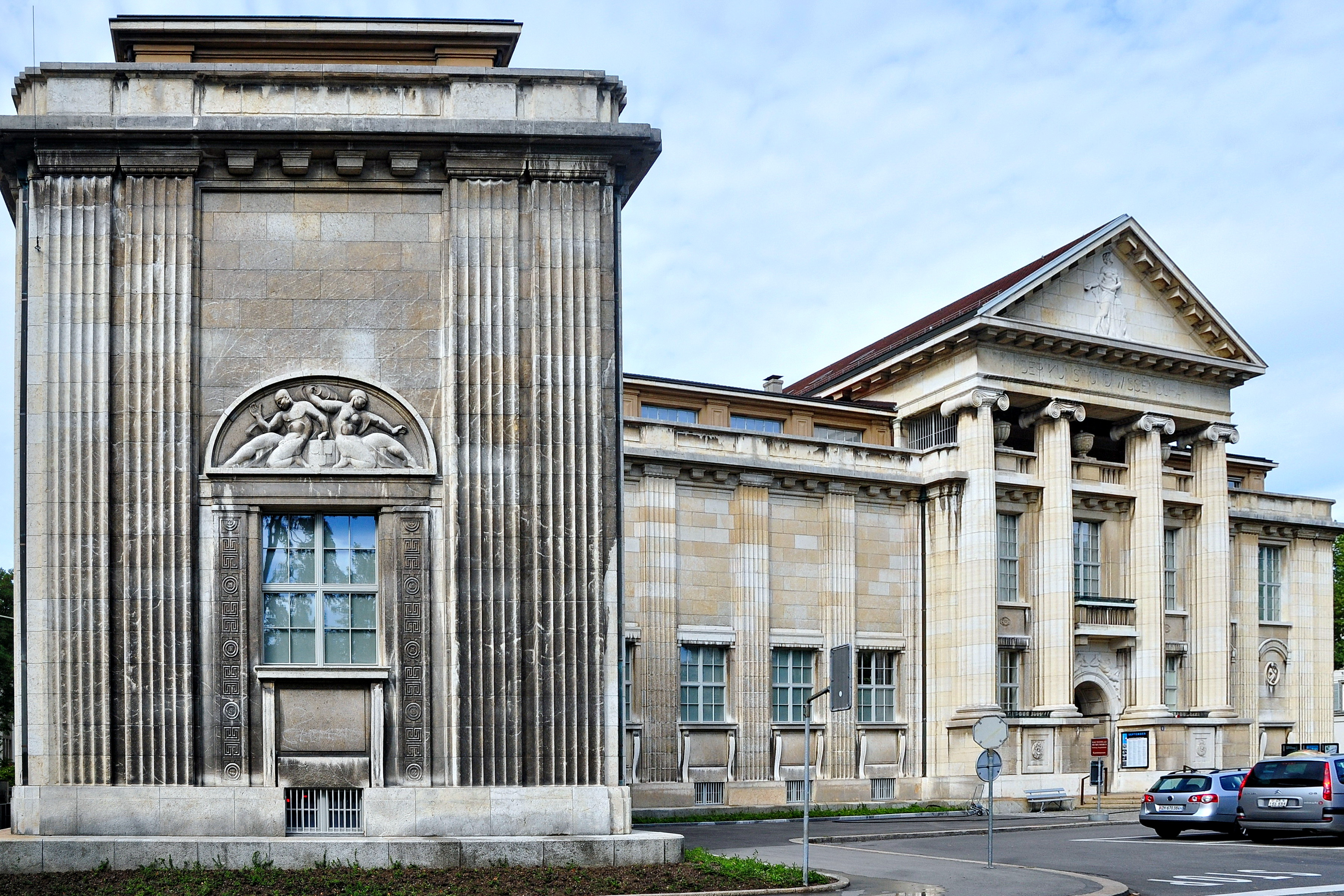
The Winterthur Museum of Art

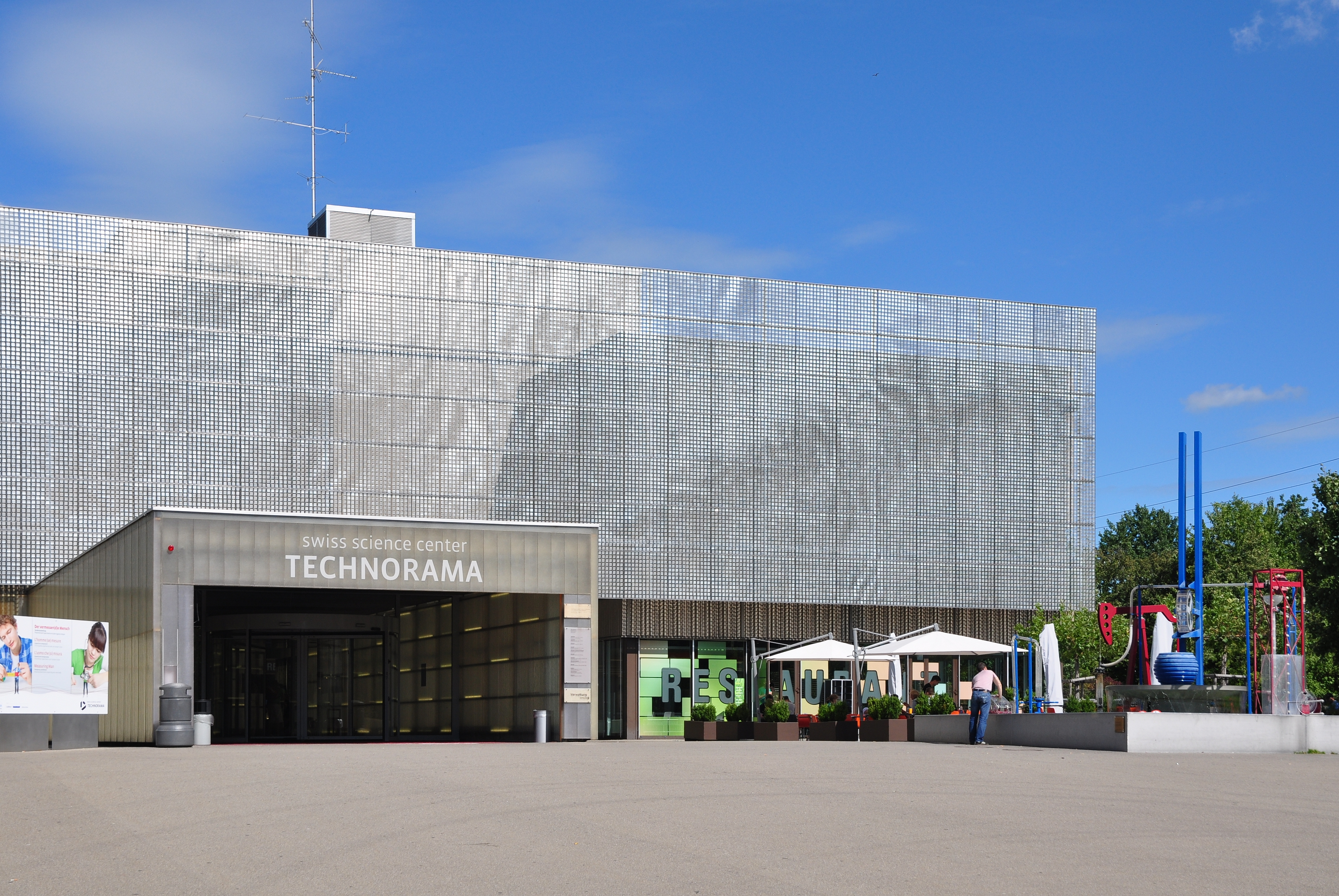
Technorama

== Culture ==
=== Architecture ===
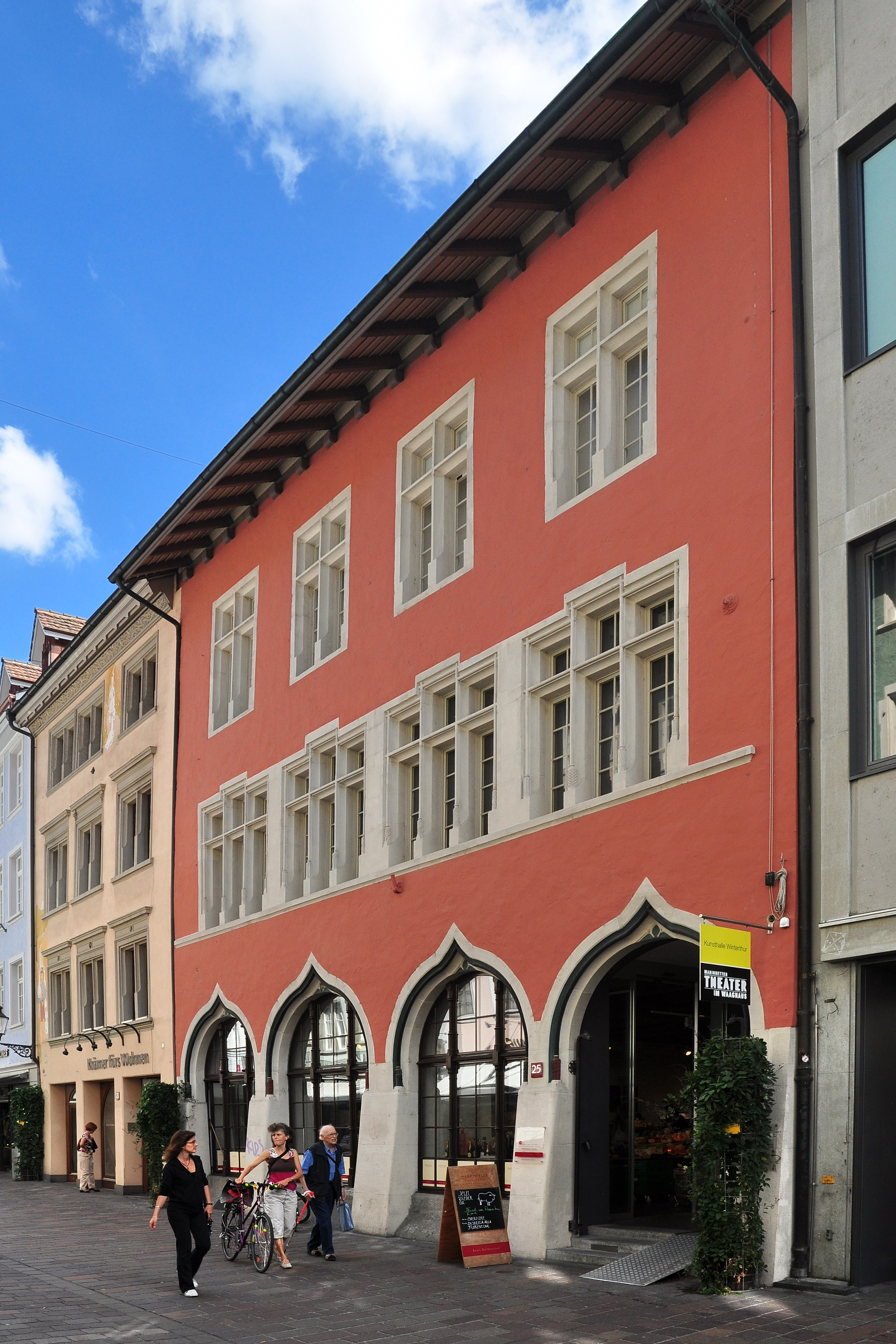
Street in the old town

The church of St. Laurenz in the city centre dates from 1264, the town hall was built in 1781, the assembly hall in 1865.

The city hall Stadthaus, in which the concerts of the Musikkollegium take place, was built by Gottfried Semper.

In 1989, Winterthur received the Wakker Prize for the development and preservation of its architectural heritage.

=== Music ===
Winterthur's chamber orchestra Orchester Musikkollegium Winterthur is the oldest orchestra in Switzerland, and also plays at the Zurich Opera. Between 1922 and 1950, the philanthropist Werner Reinhart and the conductor Hermann Scherchen played a leading role in shaping the musical life of Winterthur, with numerous premiere performances emphasizing contemporary music.

Musikfestwochen, in late August and early September, sees Winterthur's Old Town taken over for live music of all kinds, in the street and bars as well as in concert venues.

The "Albanifest", the largest annual festival in a historic town in Switzerland, is named after Saint Alban, one of the city's four saints, is held here, over three days in late June every year. Although a recent creation, the festival celebrates the granting of a charter to the town in 1264 by Rudolf of Habsburg on 22 June of that year, which happened to be the saint's day.

The Swiss folk metal band Eluveitie was formed in Winterthur, and both the Punkabilly band The Peacocks and the technical death metal band Punish come from here.

=== Arts ===
==== Open Doors ====
Open Doors is an artist supported platform for artists with art studios in Winterthur, Switzerland. The platform was established to bridge arts and the community as well as provide the artists with means to independently promote their art in any way they choose. Open Doors takes place annually during the last weekend of September. Participating artists open their studios to the public and present their art to the public. Oftentimes it is possible to view the artists while they are working. Among the approximate 60 artists who participate there are local, international, autodidacts and art academy graduates. Open Doors Winterthur was founded in 2008 by San Francisco-born artist Michelle Bird and resident of Winterthur. Open Doors Winterthur publishes the annual MAP Magazine Artist Professionals which is available on line and in print form. MAP Magazine features articles about local art initiatives and profiles local artists and their art studios. The event is supported by a map that indicates the location of each artist's studio on a map.

== Sport ==
EHC Winterthur is the city's main hockey team which currently plays in the Swiss League, the second-highest ice hockey league in Switzerland. Their arena is the 3,000-seat Deutweg Arena. The arena held in April 2011 the 2011 IIHF Women's World Championship top division, sharing the hosting with the Hallenstadion in Zurich.

FC Winterthur are the city's football club and currently play in the Swiss Super League. They play at the Stadion Schützenwiese.

Pfadi Winterthur is the professional handball club, former multiple national champions and still playing in the Swiss First League of Handball. They play at the Winterthur Central Sports Hall which they share with top floorball club HC Rychenberg Winterthur.

Winterthur Lions AFC, founded in 2017, have been playing Australian rules football in the AFL Switzerland league since 2019.

== Notable people ==
=== 1800–1850 ===
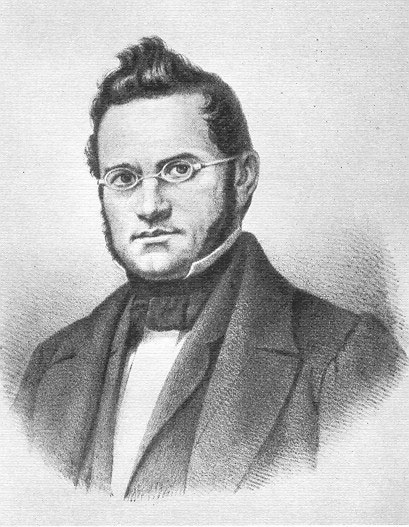
Jonas Furrer, 1850

- Jonas Furrer (1805–1861), politician, first Federal President of Switzerland
- David Eduard Steiner (1811–1860), painter, eraser and lithographer
- Henrik Haggenmacher (1827–1917), Swiss-born Hungarian industrialist, business magnate, philanthropist and investor
- Konrad Grob (1828–1904), lithographer and painter
- Jacob Weidenmann (1829–1893), landscape architect

=== 1851–1900 ===
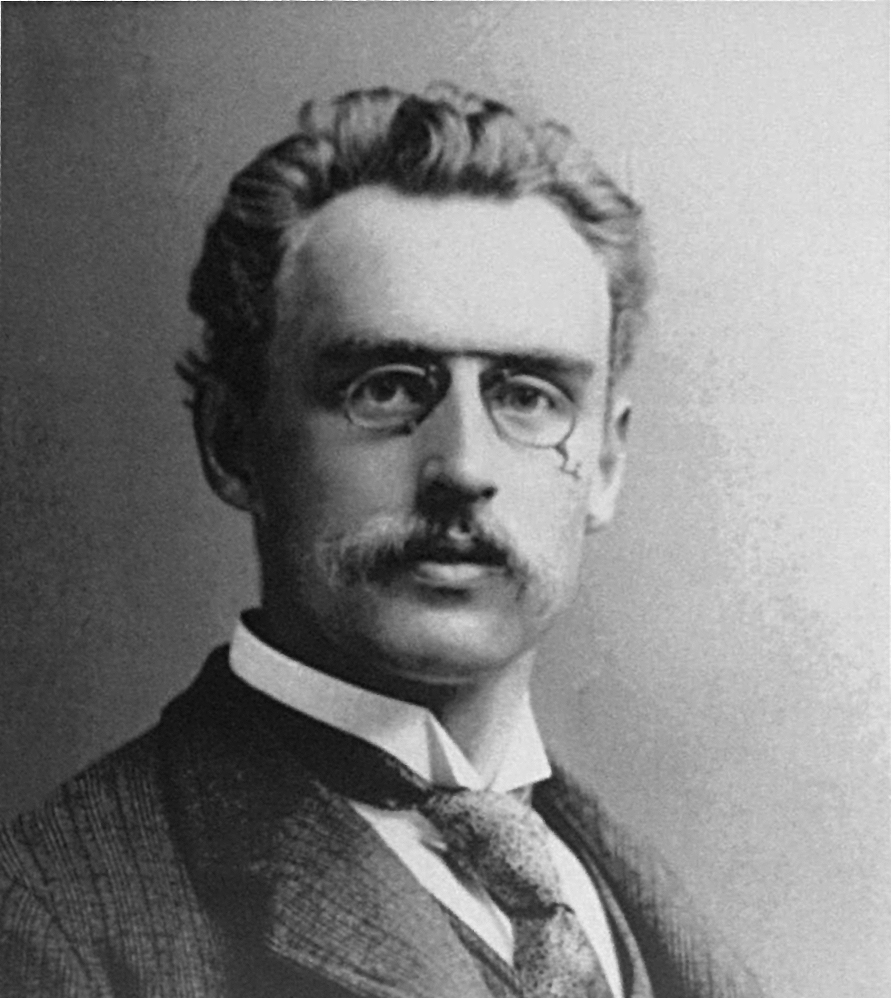
Charles Eugene Lancelot Brown around 1900

- Charles E. L. Brown (1863–1924), machine designer, co-founder (Brown, Boveri & Cie)
- Heinrich Wölfflin (1864–1945), art historian
- John Henry Hintermeister (1869–1945), Zurich educated painter, commercially successful in the United States
- Alfred Ernst (1875–1968), botanist
- Hans Gamper (1877–1930), sportsman and founder of FC Barcelona
- Ernst Wetter (1877–1963), politician
- Fritz Kuchen (1877–1973), sport shooter
- Alfred Büchi (1879–1959), inventor of the exhaust gas turbocharger
- Albert Thellung (1881–1928), botanist
- Werner Reinhart (1884–1951), industrialist and patron
- Oskar Reinhart (1885–1965), art collector and patron
- Emil Brunner (1889–1966), a reformed theologian
- Jakob Flach (1894–1982), writer, puppeteer and painter
- Willy Bretscher (1897–1992), newspaper writer and editor

=== 1901–1950 ===
- Georges Miez (1904–1999), gymnast
- Willy Hess (composer) (1906–1997), musicologist and composer
- Albert Büchi (1907–1988), cyclist
- Max Bill (1908–1994), architect, artist and designer
- Warja Lavater (1913–2007), graphic artist and illustrator
- Sigmund Widmer (1919–2003), Swiss politician, historian and writer, University of Zürich faculty
- Rudolf Friedrich (1923–2013), lawyer and politician
- Georg Gerster (1928–2019), journalist, pioneer of flight photography
- Bruno Hunziker (1930–2000), politician, parliamentarian and economic attorney
- Richard R. Ernst (1933–2021), chemist (Nobel Prize Laureate 1991)
- Ursula Bagdasarjanz (born 1934), violinist
- Hannes Keller (1934–2022), computer pioneer, entrepreneur, diving pioneer and amateur pianist
- Niklaus Wirth (1934–2024), computer scientist
- Oscar Fritschi (1939–2016), politician
- Michael Gempart (born 1941), actor
- Markus Imhoof (born 1941), film director and screenwriter
- Hans-Ulrich Brunner (1943–2006), painter
- Beat Raaflaub (born 1946), conductor
- Jürg Amann (1947–2013), writer

=== 1951–2000 ===
- Viktor Giacobbo (born 1952), Swiss writer, comedian and actor
- Mirco Müller (born 1995), Swiss ice hockey player, currently playing for the HC Lugano
- Martin Buser (born 1958), Swiss dog musher, 4-time Iditarod champion
- Marlies Bänziger (born 1960), Swiss politician
- Chantal Galladé (born 1972), Swiss politician
- Chrigel Glanzmann (born 1975), Swiss musician, founder of Eluveitie
- Steven Zuber (born 1991), Swiss professional football player
