= Mattenbach =

Coordinates: 47.487°N 8.747°E

Mattenbach District of the city of Winterthur
- District
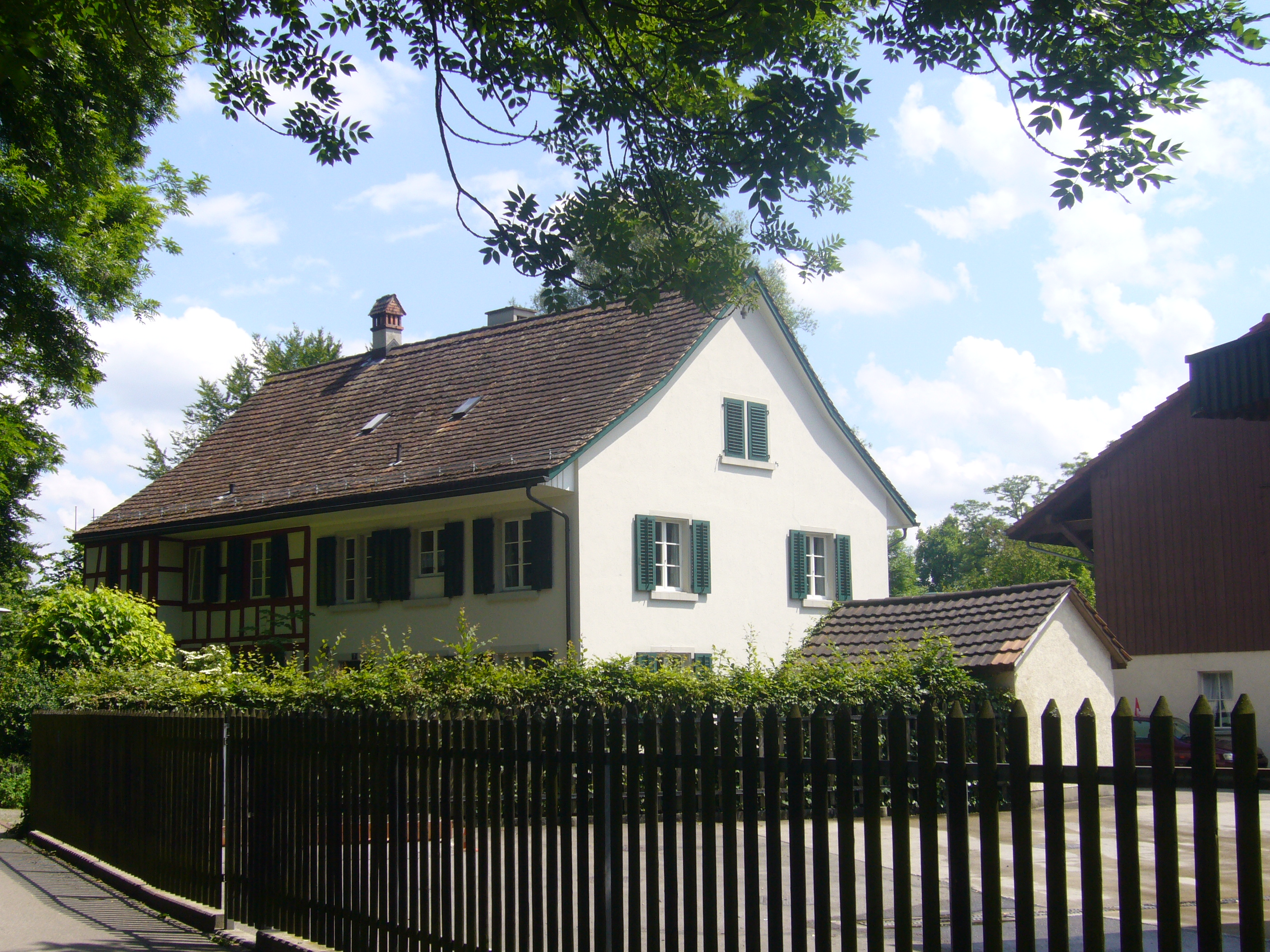

- Flag Seal

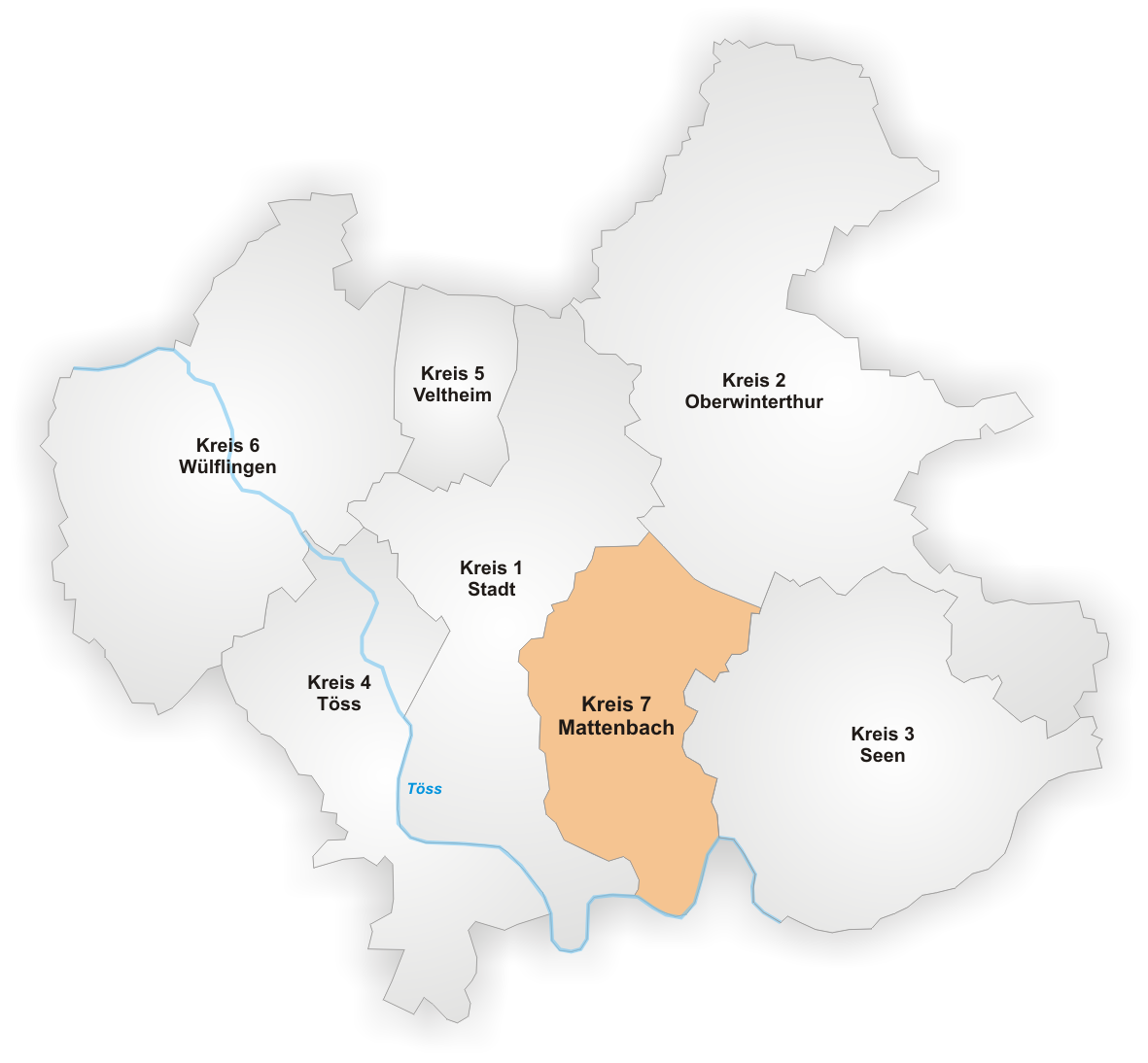
- Country: Switzerland
- Canton: Zürich
- City: Winterthur

Area
  - Total: 6.34 km^{2} (2.45 sq mi)

Population (31 Dec 2012)
  - Total: 12,098
- District number: 7
- Quarters: Deutweg; Gutschick; Endliker

Mattenbach (German pronunciation: [ˈmatn̩bax]) is a district in the Swiss city of Winterthur. It is district number 7.

The district comprises the quarters Deutweg, Gutschick and Endliker.
