= Veltheim (Winterthur) =

Coordinates: 47.514°N 8.717°E

Veltheim District of the city of Winterthur
- District
- Flag Seal

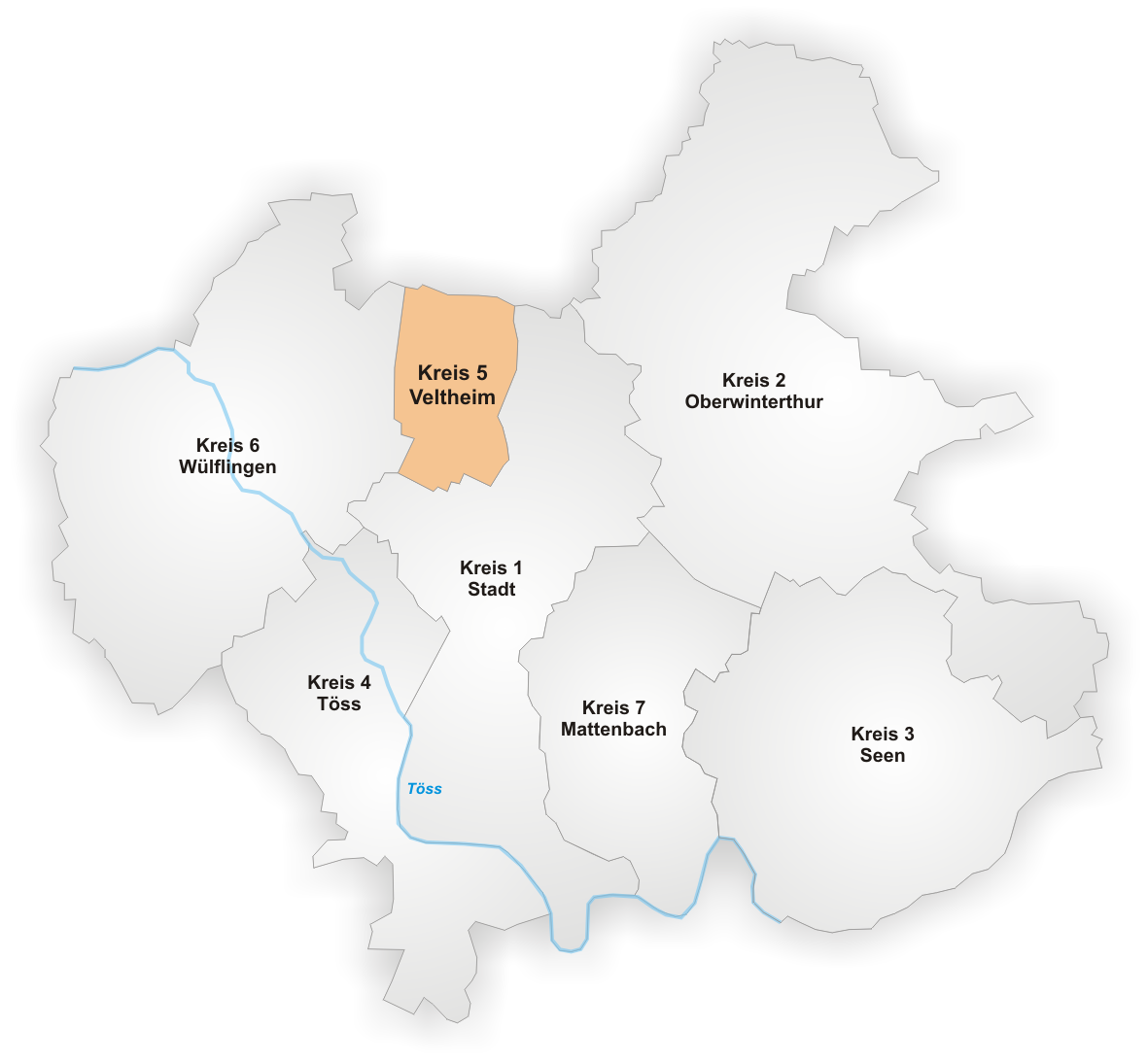
- Country: Switzerland
- Canton: Zürich
- City: Winterthur

Area
  - Total: 2.29 km^{2} (0.88 sq mi)

Population (31 Dec 2012)
  - Total: 9,740
- District number: 5
- Quarters: Rosenberg; Blumenau

Veltheim (German pronunciation: [ˈfɛlthaɪm]) is a district in the Swiss city of Winterthur. It is district number 5.

The district comprises the quarters Rosenberg and Blumenau.

Veltheim was formerly a municipality of its own, but was incorporated into Winterthur in 1922.

Aerial view by Walter Mittelholzer (1923)
