= List of wars and battles involving al-Qaeda =

List of conflicts

The following is a list of conflicts involving the militant group known as Al-Qaeda throughout its various incarnations. The group is headquartered/based in either Afghanistan or Iran and currently controls portions of territory in Somalia and Yemen. It has taken part in many battles and wars.

== Wars ==
=== Ongoing ===
- War on terror
  - War in the Sahel
    - Mali War
    - JNIM-ISGS war
- Yemeni civil war (2014–present)
  - Al-Qaeda insurgency in Yemen
  - Saudi-led intervention in the Yemeni civil war
- Insurgency in the Maghreb (2002–present)
  - US intervention in Syria
- Insurgency in Khyber Pakhtunkhwa
- Afghanistan–Pakistan border skirmishes
- Somali Civil War
  - Somali Civil War (2009–present)
- Syria in the 2026 Iran war

=== Ended ===
- Second Sudanese Civil War
- Afghan Civil War (1989–1992)
- Afghan Civil War (1992–1996)
- Afghan Civil War (1996–2001)
- War in Afghanistan (2001–2021)
- Tajikistani Civil War
- Iraq War
  - Iraqi civil war (2006–2008)
    - Iraq War troop surge of 2007
- Syrian civil war
- Syrian civil war spillover in Lebanon
- Iraqi insurgency (2011–2013)
- Factional violence in Libya (2011–2014)
- Libyan civil war (2014–2020)
- 2025 Afghanistan–Pakistan conflict (allegedly)

== Battles ==
=== 1990s ===
Battle	Allies	Opponents	Outcome
Siege of Khost (1980 – March 31, 1991)	Peshawar Seven: Hezb-e Islami Gulbuddin; Haqqani network; Harakat-i-Inqilab-i-Islami; Local Ahmadzai tribes; Arab Foreign Fighters; Al-Qaeda; Afghan Interim Government (from 1988); Hezb-e Islami Gulbuddin (until July 1989); Harakat-i Inqilab-i Islami; Supported by: Pakistan; Inter-Services Intelligence; Pakistan Air Force; Iran	Afghanistan; Soviet Union (1980–1988)	Victory
Battle of Jalalabad (1989) (March 5 – end of June 1989)	AIG; HIG; NIFA; IULA; HIK; Al-Qaeda; Saudi Arabia; Wahhabi volunteers; Pakistan; ISI; United States; CIA	Afghanistan	Defeat
First Battle of Jalalabad Airport (6–8 March)	Afghan Interim Government: Hezb-e Islami Gulbuddin (primarily); Supported by: United States; CIA; Pakistan; ISI; Al-Qaeda	Republic Of Afghanistan; Supported by: Soviet Union	Victory
Battle of Kabul (1992–1996) (April 28, 1992 – September 27, 1996)	Taliban (from late 1994); Al-Qaeda Supported by: Pakistan (from late 1994)	Islamic State of Afghanistan: Jamiat-e Islami; (Afghanistan) Shura-e Nazar; (Afghanistan) Jebh-e Nejat-e Melli; (Afghanistan) Harakat-i-Inqilab; (Afghanistan) Harakat-i Islami; (Afghanistan) Ittehad-e Islami; Hezb-i Islami Khalis (until mid-1992) Supported by: Saudi Arabia; Hezbe Wahdat (until Dec. 1992); Supported by: Iran (Afghanistan) Junbish-i Milli (until 1994); Supported by: Uzbekistan Hezb-e Islami Gulbuddin (until late 1994); Khalqists Afghan Army Units (until late 1994) Supported by: Pakistan (until late 1994) Hezbe Wahdat (after Dec. 1992); Supported by: Iran (Afghanistan) Junbish-i Milli (Jan.–Aug. 1994); Supported by: Uzbekistan	Partial Victory
Battle of Mogadishu (1993) (3–4 October 1993)	Somali National Alliance; Al-Itihaad Al-Islamiya	United Nations: United States; Malaysia; Pakistan	Victory
Battles of Mazar-i-Sharif (1997–1998) (22 May 1997 – 8 August 1998)	Islamic Emirate of Afghanistan: Taliban; Al-Qaeda: 055 Brigade; Supported by: Pakistan; Saudi Arabia	Abdul Malik Pahlawan's forces Hezbe Wahdat; Jamiat-e Islami; Hezb-e Islami Gulbuddin; Islamic Movement of Afghanistan Islamic State of Afghanistan (Northern Alliance): Junbish; Jamiat-e Islami forces loyal to Ismail Khan; Supported by: Iran; Russia; Uzbekistan	Victory

=== 2000s ===
Battle	Allies	Opponents	Outcome
Fall of Mazar-i-Sharif (9–10 November 2001)	Islamic Emirate of Afghanistan; Taliban; Haqqani Network; Al-Qaeda IMU; Tehreek-e-Nafaz-e-Shariat-e-Mohammadi; Turkistan Islamic Party; Foreign fighters; Arab fighters	Northern Alliance; Hezb-e Wahdat; Jamiat-e Islami; (Afghanistan) Junbish-i Milli; United States	Defeat
Siege of Kunduz (11 November 2001 – 23 November 2001)	Islamic Emirate of Afghanistan; Taliban; Al-Qaeda; IMU	Northern Alliance; United States	Defeat
2001 uprising in Herat (November 12, 2001)	Islamic Emirate of Afghanistan; Al-Qaeda	(Afghanistan) Northern Alliance / Islamic State; United States; Iran; Hazara Militia	Defeat
Fall of Kabul (2001) (November 12, 2001)	Islamic Emirate of Afghanistan; Al-Qaeda	Islamic State of Afghanistan; United States	Defeat
Fall of Kandahar (12–13 November 2001)	Islamic Emirate of Afghanistan; Taliban; Al-Qaeda	Gul Sharzai-led militia Islamic State of Afghanistan; United States; Australia	Defeat
Battle of Qala-i-Jangi (25 November 2001 – 1 December 2001)	Prisoners: Taliban; Al-Qaeda; Islamic Movement of Uzbekistan; Turkistan Islamic Party	Coalition: Northern Alliance; United States; United Kingdom	Defeat
Battle of Tora Bora (December 6, 2001 – December 17, 2001)	Al-Qaeda; Taliban: 055 Brigade; Turkistan Islamic Party; Tehreek-e-Nafaz-e-Shariat-e-Mohammadi	Islamic State of Afghanistan; United States; United Kingdom; Germany	Partial Defeat
Operation Anaconda (March 1–18, 2002)	Taliban; Al-Qaeda; Islamic Movement of Uzbekistan	Coalition: United States; Australia; Afghanistan; United Kingdom; Canada; Germany; France; Norway; Netherlands; Denmark; New Zealand	Defeat
Battle of Takur Ghar (4–5 March 2002)	Taliban; Al-Qaeda: Islamic Movement of Uzbekistan	United States	Defeat
Operation Harpoon (2002) (March 13–19, 2002)	Taliban; Al-Qaeda	United States; Canada	Defeat
Operation Jacana (April, 2002–July, 2002)	Taliban; Al-Qaeda	Coalition: United Kingdom; United States; Australia; Norway	Defeat
Sétif offensive (September 2003)	GSPC	Algeria	Defeat
Battle of Wana (March 16–23, 2004)	Al-Qaeda; Pakistani Taliban	Pakistan	Defeat
First Battle of Fallujah (4 April – 1 May 2004)	Jama'at Al-Tawhid wal-Jihad; Islamic Army in Iraq; Ba'ath Party loyalists	United States	Victory
2004 Good Friday ambush (April 9, 2004)	Mujahideen Shura; Organization of Monotheism and Jihad; Mahdi Army	United States; U.S. Army; KBR, Inc.	Victory
Houthi insurgency (18 June 2004 – 6 February 2015)	Al-Qaeda: Al-Qaeda in the Arabian Peninsula; Ansar Al-Sharia	Yemen: Security Forces; Sunni tribes; Al-Islah militias; Saudi Arabia; Supported by: Jordan; Morocco Houthi Movement Yemen (pro-Saleh forces)Alleged support by: Iran[20][21] North Korea[22][23][24] Libya (until 2011)[25]	Stalmate
Battle of Samarra (2004) (October 1–3, 2004)	Jama'at Al-Tawhid wal-Jihad; Ba'ath Party loyalists	United States; Iraq	Defeat
Second Battle of Fallujah (7 November – 23 December 2004)	Al-Qaeda in Iraq; Islamic Army in Iraq; Ansar Al-Sunnah; 1920 Revolution Brigades	United States; Iraq; United Kingdom	Defeat
Battle of Mosul (2004) (November 8–16, 2004)	Al-Qaeda in Iraq; Ansar Al-Sunna; Islamic Army in Iraq; Ba'ath Party Loyalists; Brigades of the Army of the Mustafa; Army of the Conqueror; Other Iraqi insurgents	United States (Iraq) Iraqi Security Forces (Kurdistan Region) Peshmerga	Defeat
Lake Tharthar raid (March 23, 2005)	Secret Army of Islam; Ba'ath Party loyalists Al-Qaeda in Iraq; Other Iraqi insurgents	Iraq; United States	Defeat
Battle of Abu Ghraib (2 April 2005)	Iraqi insurgents: Al Qaeda in Iraq	United States	Defeat
Lemgheity attack (June 4, 2005)	GSPC	Mauritania	Victory
Battle of Al Qaim (8 May 2005 – 19 May 2005)	Al-Qaeda in Iraq; Others	United States	Defeat
Operation Sayeed (July 2005 – 22 December 2005)	Al-Qaeda in Iraq; Ba'ath Party Loyalists; Ansar Al-Sunna; Other Insurgents	United States: Multi-National Forces West; Iraq: New Iraqi Army; Iraqi Police	Defeat
Battle of Haditha (1–4 August 2005)	Al-Qaeda in Iraq; Ansar Al-Sunna; Other Iraqi insurgents	United States	Defeat
Battle of Tal Afar (2005) (September 1–18, 2005)	Al-Qaeda in Iraq	United States; Iraq	Defeat
Operation Steel Curtain (5–22 November 2005)	Al-Qaeda in Iraq; Other insurgents	United States (Iraq) New Iraqi Army	Defeat
Battle of Baghdad (2006–2008) (22 February 2006 – 11 May 2008)	Sunni factions: Al-Qaeda in Iraq (until October 2006) Islamic State of Iraq (from October 2006); Sunni tribes Other militias	Public stability: (Iraq) Iraqi security forces Sunni Awakening movement United States; United Kingdom; Other coalition forces Shia factions: Mahdi Army; Special Groups: Asa'ib Ahl Al-Haq; Kata'ib Hezbollah; Promised Day Brigades; Badr Brigades; Rogue elements of Iraqi security forces Soldiers of Heaven; Shia tribes Other militias	Defeat
Battle of Ramadi (2006) (March 15 – November 15, 2006)	Mujahideen Shura Council: Al-Qaeda in Iraq Later reformed as: Islamic State of Iraq	United States; United Kingdom (Iraq) New Iraqi Army	Defeat
Operation Swarmer (16 March 2006 – 22 March 2006)	Mujahideen Shura Council: Al-Qaeda in Iraq; Other Iraqi insurgents	United States; MNF–I (Iraq) New Iraqi Army	Indecisive
Operation Scorpion (24 March 2006 – 25 March 2006)	Al-Qaeda: Mujahideen Shura Council; Al-Qaeda in Iraq; Other Iraqi insurgents	(United States) US-led coalition (Iraq) New Iraqi Army	Indecisive
Operation Larchwood 4 (16 April 2006)	Mujahideen Shura Council: AlQaeda in Iraq	United Kingdom; United States (Support); Iraq (Support)	Defeat
Operation Mountain Thrust (15 May 2006 – 31 July 2006)	Taliban; Al-Qaeda	Coalition: Afghanistan; United Kingdom; United States; Canada; Australia; Romania; Netherlands; Czech Republic	Partial Defeat
Operation Together Forward (14 June 2006 – 24 October 2006)	Mujahideen Shura Council: Al-Qaeda in Iraq; Al-Mahdi Army	United States Army (United Kingdom) British Army (Iraq) New Iraqi Army	Victory
Battle of Ramadi (2006) (17 June 2006 – 15 November 2006)	Mujahideen Shura Council: al-Qaeda in Iraq Later reformed as: Islamic State of Iraq	United States; United Kingdom (Iraq) New Iraqi Army	Indecisive
Second Battle of Habbaniyah (August 17, 2006 – February 14, 2007)	Al-Qaeda in Iraq	United States	Defeat
Islamic Army–al-Qaeda conflict (Summer 2006 – 6 June 2007)	Mujahideen Shura Council (Iraq): Al-Qaeda in Iraq; Kurdistan Brigades; Jaish al-Ta'ifa al-Mansurah; Katbiyan Ansar al-Tawhid wal Sunnah; Saray al-Jihad Group; Al-Ghuraba Brigades; Al-Ahwal Brigades; from October 2006: Islamic State of Iraq	Anti-AQI Forces: Islamic Army of Iraq; Ansar Al-Sunnah; 1920 Revolution Brigade; Hamas of Iraq	Indecisive
Operation Mountain Fury (16 September 2006 – 15 January 2007)	(Afghanistan) Taliban; Al-Qaeda	Islamic Republic of Afghanistan; Canada; United States; United Kingdom; Netherlands; Italy; Estonia	Defeat
Ramadan Offensive (2006) (23 September 2006 – 22 October 2006)	Mujahideen Shura Council: Al-Qaeda in Iraq	United States; Iraq; United Kingdom; Denmark El Salvador	Victory
Battle of Turki (15 November 2006 – 16 November 2006)	Islamic State of Iraq	United States	Defeat
Diyala campaign (25 December 2006 – 1 October 2007)	Islamic State of Iraq; Other Iraqi Insurgents	United States; Iraq (Kurdistan Region) Peshmerga	Defeat
Diyala campaign (6–24 January 2007)	Islamic State of Iraq; Other Iraqi insurgents	United States; Iraq	First Phase: Insurgent ambush Second Phase: (United States) (Iraq) Allied victory
Operation Juniper Shield (19 years, 6 months and 4 weeks)	Islamist militants; Al-Qaeda; Jama'at Nasr al-Islam wal Muslimin; MOJWA (until 2013); AQIM; Al-Mourabitoun (until 2017); Ansar al-Sharia; Macina Liberation Front; Ansar Dine (until 2017); Boko Haram (partially aligned with ISIL since 2015); Ansaru; ISIL; Islamic State in the Greater Sahara (2015–present); Islamic State – West Africa Province	Algeria; Morocco; Mauritania; Tunisia; Burkina Faso; Chad; Mali; Niger; Nigeria; Senegal; Cameroon; Togo; Ghana; Ivory Coast; Benin; Cape Verde (The Gambia) Gambia; Guinea; Guinea-Bissau; Liberia; Sierra Leone Supported and trained By: United States; Canada; France; Germany; Netherlands; Spain; United Kingdom; Denmark; Czech Republic; Sweden	Ongoing
Operation Murfreesboro (18 February 2007 – 2 March 2007)	Islamic state of Iraq	United States (Iraq) Iraqi Army	Defeat
Operation Shurta Nasir (15 February 2007)	Islamic State of Iraq	United States (Iraq) Iraqi Police Forces	Defeat
Battle of Baqubah (10 March – 19 August 2007)	Islamic State of Iraq	United States; Iraq	Defeat
Operation Alljah (16 June 2007 – 14 August 2007)	Islamic State of Iraq; Other Iraqi Insurgents	United States; New Iraqi Army	Defeat
Operation Phantom Thunder (16 June 2007 – 14 August 2007)	Islamic State of Iraq Mahdi Army Other Iraqi insurgents	United States (Iraq) Iraqi Army (Iraq) Revolution Brigade (Iraq) Awakening Movement	Defeat
Operation Commando Eagle (21 June 2007 – 14 August 2007)	Islamic State of Iraq; Other Iraqi insurgents	United States; New Iraqi Army	Defeat
Operation Bull Run (24 June 2007 – 26 June 2007)	Islamic State of Iraq; Other Iraqi insurgents	United States (Iraq) New Iraqi Army	Defeat
Battle of Donkey Island (30 June 2007 – 1 July 2007)	Islamic State of Iraq	United States	Defeat
Operation Phantom Strike (15 August 2007 – January 2008)	Islamic State of Iraq Mahdi Army Other Iraqi insurgents	United States; Iraq	Defeat
Operation Phantom Phoenix (8 January 2008, – 28 July 2008)	Islamic state of Iraq; Other Iraqi Insurgents	United States; Iraq (Georgia (country)) Georgia; United Kingdom	Partial Defeat
Ninawa campaign (23 January 2008 – 28 July 2008)	Islamic state of Iraq; Other Iraqi Insurgents	United States; Iraq	Indecisive
2008 Al-Qaeda offensive in Iraq (15 April 2008 – 19 May 2008)	Islamic State of Iraq	United States Army; New Iraqi Army	Indecisive
Operation Sirat-e-Mustaqeem (28 June 2008 – 9 July 2008)	TNSM; Al-Qaeda; Lashkar-e-Islam	Pakistan	Defeat
Battle of Mogadishu (2009) (7 May 2009 – 1 October 2009)	Al-Shabaab; Hizbul Islam; Foreign Mujahideen; Al-Qaeda	Somalia: (Somalia) ARS-D-TFG coalition; AMISOM	Partial victory
Second Battle of Swat (16 May – 15 July 2009)	TTP: TNSM; Al-Qaeda; Lashkar-e-Islam	Pakistan: Pakistan Army; Pakistan Air Force	Defeat
Battle of Garn-Akassa (June 16, 2009)	AQIM	Mali	Defeat
2009 Baraawe raid (14 September 2009)	Al-Qaeda; Al-Shabaab	United States	Defeat
Battle of Araouane (2009) (July 4, 2009)	AQIM and affiliated drug traffickers	Mali	victory
Operation Augurs of Prosperity (29 July 2008 – 11 August 2008)	Islamic State of Iraq; Other Iraqi Insurgents	United States; Iraq	Defeat
Operation Rah-e-Nijat (19 June 2009 – 12 December 2009)	Tehrik-i-Taliban Pakistan; Islamic Movement of Uzbekistan; Islamic Jihad Union (IMU splinter faction); Al-Qaeda; Foreign Mujahideen	Pakistan	Defeat
Battle of Bajaur (7 August 2008 – 28 February 2009)	TTP; Al-Qaeda; TNSM	Pakistan	Defeat
Counterinsurgency in Northern Afghanistan (April 2009 – December 2014)	Insurgents; Taliban; Al-Qaeda	Coalition; Germany; United States; France; Afghanistan; Belgium; Sweden; Norway; Finland; Croatia	Defeat
Second Battle of Swat (16 May 2009 – 15 July 2009)	TTP: TNSM; Al-Qaeda; Lashkar-e-Islam	Pakistan: Pakistan Army; Pakistan Air Force	Defeat

=== 2010s ===
Battle	Allies	Opponents	Outcome
Operation Moshtarak (13 February 2010 – 7 December 2010)	Taliban; Al-Qaeda	ISAF: United States; United Kingdom; France; Estonia; Denmark; Canada; Islamic Republic of Afghanistan	Defeat
2010 Tilwa attack (March 8, 2010)	AQIM	Niger	Indecisive
Raid on Akla (July 22, 2010)	AQIM	Mauritania; France	Franco-Mauritanian tactical victory AQIM strategic victory
Battle of Lawdar (2010) (19–25 August 2010)	Al-Qaeda in the Arabian Peninsula	Yemen: Security Forces	Defeat
Battle of Mogadishu (2010–2011) (23 August 2010 – 6 August 2011)	Al-Shabaab; Hizbul Islam Alleged: Al-Qaeda	Transitional Federal Republic of Somalia; ARS-D-TFG coalition: AMISOM; Ahlu Sunna Waljama'a<; Limited involvement: United States; European Union	Defeat
Battle of Areich Hind (September 17–19, 2010)	AQIM	Mauritania	Inconclusive
2011 Tabankort raid (January 8, 2011)	AQIM	France; Niger	Indecisive
Battle of Gedo	Harakat Al-Shabaab Mujahideen	Federal Government of Somalia Ahlu Sunna Waljama'a	Ongoing
Operation Neptune Spear (2 May 2011)	Al-Qaeda	United States	Defeat
Siege of Homs (6 May 2011 – 9 May 2014)	Syrian Opposition; (Syria) Free Officers Movement (Note: 9 June 2011 – mid-2012 (part of the Free Syrian Army since 23 September 2011)); (Syrian opposition) Free Syrian Army (Note: From October 2011 onwards.); Islamic Front; Al-Nusra Front	(Syria) Syrian Government Hezbollah SSNP Russia	Defeat
PNS Mehran attack (22 May 2011 – 23 May 2011)	(Afghanistan) TTP; Al-Qaeda	Pakistan; Pakistan Navy	Defeat
Battle of Ouraren (2011) (June 12, 2011)	(Islamic State) Al-Qaeda in the Islamic Maghreb	Niger	Defeat
Battle of Bassikounou (July 5, 2011)	AQIM	Mauritania	Defeat
Battle of Zinjibar (27 May 2011 – 10 September 2011)	Al-Qaeda; Al-Qaeda in the Arabian Peninsula	Yemen; Supported by: United States; Saudi Arabia	Victory
Idlib Governorate clashes (September 2011–March 2012) (8 September 2011 – 27 March 2012)	Syrian Opposition; (Syrian opposition) Free Syrian Army; Ahrar al-Sham; Al-Nusra Front; Free Officers Movement (until 23 September 2011, when it joined the FSA)	(Syria) Syrian Government	Partial victory
Rif Dimashq clashes (November 2011–March 2012) (3 November 2011 – 1 April 2012)	Syrian Opposition; (Syrian opposition) Free Syrian Army; Ahrar al-Sham; Al-Nusra Front	(Syria) Syrian Government; PFLP–GC	Defeat
Battle of Adrar Bouss (15 September 2011)	(Islamic State) Al-Qaeda in the Islamic Maghreb	Niger	Defeat
Battle of Aguelhok (17 January 2012 – 25 January 2012)	(Azawad) MNLA; AQIM; Ansar Dine	Mali: 713th Nomad Company	Victory
Battle of Tessalit (18 January 2012 – 11 March 2012)	Mali: Malian Army	Azawad: MNLA; Ansar Dine; AQIM	Victory
Battle of Dofas (4 March 2012 – 5 March 2012)	Al-Qaeda in the Arabian Peninsula; Ansar al-Sharia	Yemen Supported by: United States	Victory
Battle of Yurkud (2012) (10 March 2012)	Al-Shabab	Ethiopia	Defeat
2012 Abyan offensive (12 May 2012 – 15 June 2012)	Al-Qaeda in the Arabian Peninsula; Ansar al-Sharia	Yemen; Supported by: United States; Saudi Arabia	Defeat
Battle of the Wagadou Forest (2011) (June 24, 2011)	AQIM	Mauritania; Mali	Defeat
Battles of Gao and Timbuktu (26 June 2012 – 27 June 2012)	Islamists: MOJWA; AQIM; Ansar Dine; Boko Haram	Azawad: MNLA	Victory
Siege of Nubl and Al-Zahraa (19 July 2012 – 3 February 2016)	Free Syrian Army; Islamic Front; Al-Nusra Front; Islamic State of Iraq and the Levant	(Syria) Syrian Government; Iran; Russia (from late 2015); Allied militias: Hezbollah; Harakat Hezbollah Al-Nujaba	Defeat
2012–2017 Lebanon–Syria border clashes (14 years, 3 months and 2 days)	Free Syrian Army; Saraya Ahl al-Sham (surrendered); Al-Nusra Front; Islamic State (2013–17); 313 Brigade (Syria); Jaysh al-Islam; Ahrar al-Sham; Al-Qaeda and allies: Hay'at Tahrir al-Sham (2017) (surrendered); Fatah al-Islam (until 2014); Ghuraba al-Sham (until 2013); Jund al-Sham (until 2014); Abdullah Azzam Brigades; Osbat al-Ansar; Osbat al-Nour; Sunni Resistance Committees	Lebanon; Lebanese Armed Forces; Internal Security Forces; Syria; Syrian Armed Forces; Hezbollah; Hezbollah Military	Defeat
Siege of Menagh Air Base (2 August 2012 – 6 August 2013)	Syrian Opposition; Free Syrian Army; Syrian Islamic Liberation Front; Al-Nusra Front; Islamic State; Jaish al-Muhajireen wal-Ansar (JAMWA)	(Syria) Syrian Government	Victory
Siege of Abu Al-Duhur Airbase (23 September 2012 – 9 September 2015)	Army of Conquest: Al-Nusra Front; Ahrar ash-Sham; Jund Al-Aqsa; Ajnad ash-Sham; Turkistan Islamic Party in Syria; (Syria) Free Syrian Army (until late 2014)	(Syria) Syrian Arab Republic: Syrian Armed Forces; National Defense Force	Victory
Battle of Kismayo (2012) (28 September 2012 – 1 October 2012)	Al-Shabaab	Kenya Defence Forces; Raskamboni Movement Alleged: United States	Defeat
Battle of Maarat Al-Numan (2012) (8 October 2012 – 13 October 2012)	Free Syrian Army; Al-Nusra Front	(Syria) Syrian Armed Forces	Victory
Battle of Ras Al-Ayn (8 November 2012 – 17 July 2013)	(Syrian opposition) Revolutionary Military Council of Hasaka: Free Syrian Army; Ahfad Al-Rasul Brigades; Al-Nusra Front; Ghuraba Al-Sham; Supported by: Turkey	Rojava (under the DBK): YPG; YPJ (third phase); (Syria) Syrian Arab Republic: Syrian Armed Forces	Defeat
Battle of Menaka (16 November 2012 – 20 November 2012)	Islamist coalition: AQIM; MOJWA	Azawad: MNLA; Tuareg volunteers	Victory
Battle of Darayya (November 2012–March 2013) (15 November 2012 – 14 February 2013)	National Coalition: (Syrian opposition) Free Syrian Army; Mujahideen: Ahrar ash-Sham; Jabhat Al-Nusra	(Syria) Syrian Arab Republic: Syrian Armed Forces	Victory
Battle of Konna (10–18 January 2013)	Islamists groups: Ansar Dine; MOJWA; AQIM; Boko Haram	Mali; France	Defeat
Bulo Marer hostage rescue attempt (11 January 2013)	Al-Shabaab	France; Supported by: United States	Victory
Battle of Diabaly (14–21 January 2013)	Islamists groups: Ansar Dine; MOJWA; AQIM; Boko Haram	Mali; France	Partial Defeat
Battle of Safira (6 February 2013 – 19 February 2013)	Al-Nusra Front	Syrian Armed Forces	Victory
Battle of Ifoghas (22 February 2013)	Ansar Dine; MOJWA; AQIM; Boko Haram; Al-Mulathameen	France; Chad	Defeat
Battle of Shadadeh (12–14 February 2013)	Al-Nusra Front	(Syria) Syrian Arab Republic: Syrian Armed Forces	Victory
Akashat ambush (4 March 2013)	Islamic State of Iraq	(Syria) Syrian Arab Republic; Iraq	Victory
Battle of Raqqa (3 March 2013 – 6 March 2013)	Syrian Islamic Front; Ahrar al-Sham; Free Syrian Army; Al-Nusra Front; Islamic State of Iraq	(Ba'athist Syria) Syrian Government	Victory
Battle of Tigharghar (12 March 2013)	AQIM	Chad	Defeat
Second Battle of Timbuktu (20 March 2013 – 1 April 2013)	AQIM	Mali; France	Defeat
Battle of Radda (29 March 2013 – 27 April 2013)	Al-Qaeda in the Arabian Peninsula: Ansar Al-Sharia; Islamic Emirate of Abyan; other Islamists groups	Yemen: Military of Yemen; People's Committees	Indecisive
Al-Qusayr offensive (2013) (4 April 2013 – 8 June 2013)	(Syrian opposition) Free Syrian Army; Syrian Islamic Liberation Front; Syrian Islamic Front; Al-Nusra Front	(Syria) Syrian Arab Republic: Syrian Arab Armed Forces; National Defense Forces; Popular Committees; Shabiha; Hezbollah; Iran: (Islamic Revolutionary Guard Corps) IRGC	Defeat
2013 Hawija clashes (23 April 2013 – 26 April 2013)	Naqshbandi Army; Islamic State of Iraq and the Levant	(Iraq) Iraqi Government; Kurdistan Region; (Kurdistan Region) Peshmerga; Sahwa militia	Victory
Battle of Al-Qusayr (2013) (19 May 2013 – 5 June 2013)	(Syrian opposition) Free Syrian Army; Syrian Islamic Liberation Front; Syrian Islamic Front; Al-Nusra Front	(Syria) Syrian Arab Republic; Hezbollah	Defeat
Operation Al-Shabah (20 May 2013 – 14 July 2013)	Islamic State of Iraq and the Levant; Al-Nusra Front	(Iraq) Iraqi Government: Iraqi Army; Iraqi Air Force; Iraqi Police	Indecisive
Syrian Kurdish–Islamist conflict (2013–present) (13 years, 1 month, 2 weeks and 4 days)	Al-Nusra Front (2013–17); Ahrar ash-Sham; Jaysh Al-Islam (Syrian opposition) Free Syrian Army factions: Mare' Operations Room (2014–16); Hawar Kilis Operations Room (since 2016); Syrian Turkmen Brigades; Fatah Halab (2015–17) Supported by: Turkey (artillery strikes and arms); Qatar (arms); Saudi Arabia (arms)	Syrian Democratic Forces And allied groups CJTF-OIR (airstrikes, arms, and ground troops) (from 2014): United States; Australia; United Kingdom; France; Netherlands; United Arab Emirates; Saudi Arabia (from 2018); Czech Republic; (Kurdistan Region) Iraqi Kurdistan (limited involvement); Russia (until 2024); Ba'athist Syria (until 2024) Islamic State: Military of IS; Dokumacılar (2013–17)	Ongoing
2013 Latakia offensive (4–19 August 2013)	Al-Qaeda; Islamic State of Iraq and the Levant; Al-Nusra Front; Free Syrian Army; Syrian Turkmen Brigades; Ahfad al-Rasul Brigades; Syrian Islamic Front; Ahrar ash-Sham; Ansar al-Sham; Junud al-Sham; Harakat Sham al-Islam	(Syria) Syrian Arab Republic	Defeat
Battle of Ma'loula (4 September 2013 – 15 September 2013)	Syrian opposition; Free Syrian Army; Al-Nusra Front; Ahrar ash-Sham	(Syria) Syrian government Syrian Social Nationalist Party; Hezbollah	Defeat
Rif Dimashq offensive (September–November 2013) (10 September 2013 – 28 November 2013)	Free Syrian Army: Damascus Military Council; Islamic Front (from 22 November): Jaysh Al-Islam; Ahrar ash-Sham; Al-Nusra Front	(Syria) Syrian Arab Republic: Syrian Armed Forces; Hezbollah; Liwa Abu Al-Fadhal Al-Abbas; LAAG; Arab Nationalist Guard	Defeat
Aleppo offensive (October–December 2013) (1 October 2013 – 1 December 2013)	Syrian Opposition; Free Syrian Army; Al-Nusra Front; Ahrar al-Sham; Nour al-Din al-Zenki Movement; Islamic State	(Syria) Syrian Government; Hezbollah	Defeat
Battle of Sadad (21 October 2013 – 28 October 2013)	Al-Nusra Front; Islamic State of Iraq and the Levant (Syria) Free Syrian Army	(Syria) Syrian Government; Syrian Social Nationalist Party	Defeat
Battle of Qalamoun (2013) (15 November 2013 – 26 April 2014)	Al-Nusra Front; Islamic State of Iraq and the Levant; Green Battalion Free Syrian Army; Islamic Front	(Syria) Syrian Government; Allied militias: Hezbollah; Arab Nationalist Guard	Defeat
Battle of Murak (1 February – 23 October 2014)	Syrian Opposition; Free Syrian Army; Islamic Front; Al-Nusra Front; Sham Legion; Liwa Aqab al-Islami	(Syria) Syrian Government; Hezbollah	Defeat
Daraa offensive (February–May 2014) (3 February 2014 – 27 May 2014)	Free Syrian Army Islamic Front: Ahrar ash-Sham; Al-Nusra Front	(Syria) Syrian Arab Republic: Syrian Armed Forces; National Defense Force; Hezbollah; Arab Nationalist Guard	Indecisive
Al-Otaiba ambush (26 February 2014)	Al-Nusra Front	Hezbollah; Supported by: (Syria) Syrian Arab Republic	Defeat
2014 Idlib offensive (5 March 2014 – 25 May 2014)	Al-Nusra Front; Free Syrian Army; Islamic Front; Jaysh Al-Sham; Sham Legion; Jund Al-Aqsa; Liwaa Al-Umma	(Syria) Syrian Arab Republic: Syrian Armed Forces; National Defense Force	Victory
Battle of Hosn (20 March 2014)	Jund Al-Sham; Ahrar ash-Sham; Al-Nusra Front; Islamic Front; Free Syrian Army	(Syria) Syrian Arab Republic; Hezbollah	Defeat
2014 Latakia offensive (21 March 2014 – 15 June 2014)	Al-Nusra Front; Junud Al-Sham; Harakat Sham Al-Islam; Islamic Front: Ahrar ash-Sham; Ansar Al-Sham; Free Syrian Army; Syrian Turkmen Brigades; Supported by: Turkey; United States	(Syria) Syrian Arab Republic: Syrian Armed Forces; Syrian Army; Suqur Al-Sahara; National Defense Forces; Syrian Resistance; Ba'ath Brigades; Hezbollah	Defeat
Battle of Markada (21–31 March 2014)	Al-Nusra Front	Islamic State of Iraq and the Levant: Al-Barakah Province; Katiba Al-Bittar Al-Libi	Defeat
Battle of Al-Malihah (4 April 2014 – 14 December 2014)	(Syria) Free Syrian Army Islamic Front: Jaysh Al-Islam; Al-Nusra Front	(Syria) Syrian Arab Republic: Syrian Arab Armed Forces; National Defense Force; Hezbollah; LAAG; Liwa Fatemiyoun	Defeat
Second siege of Wadi Deif (4 April 2014 – 14 December 2014)	Al-Qaeda: Al-Nusra Front; Islamic Front; Sham Legion; Free Syrian Army	(Syria) Syrian Arab Republic: Syrian Arab Armed Forces; National Defense Force	Victory
Battle of Dayet in Maharat (16 2014 – 17 April 2014)	Al-Qaeda in the Islamic Maghreb	France	Defeat
Operation Zarb-e-Azb (15 June 2014 – 22 February 2017)	Insurgent groups: Tehreek-e-Taliban Pakistan; Lashkar-e-Islam; Lashkar-e-Jhangvi; East Turkestan Islamic Movement; Al-Qaeda; Haqqani network; Cross-border attacking militants; Formerly: Jamaat-ul-Ahrar (Rejoined TTP on 12 March 2015); Islamic Movement of Uzbekistan (Until Mid 2015); Islamic State of Iraq and the Levant: Wilayat Khorasan (from 2015); Jundallah; Tehreek-e-Khilafat; Islamic Movement of Uzbekistan	Pakistan: Pakistan Army; Pakistan Air Force; Special Forces; ISI Covert Action Division; Elite Commandos; Elite Paratroopers; Elite Police; Civil Armed Forces; Pakistan Frontier Corps	Defeat
Operation Inherent Resolve (12 years, 2 months, 2 weeks and 5 days)	Islamic State Al-Qaeda: Al-Nusra Front (2014–17); Khorasan group (2012–2017); Jund Al-Aqsa (2014–17); Hurras Al-Din (2018–2025); Turkistan Islamic Party Islamic Front (2013–15): Ahrar ash-Sham (2014–18); Syrian Salvation Government (2017–24): Tahrir Al-Sham (2017–25)	United States: U.S. Armed Forces	Ongoing
2014 Hama offensive (26 July 2014 – 19 September 2014)	Al-Nusra Front; Free Syrian Army; Syrian Revolutionary Command Council; Islamic Front; Ajnad al-Sham; Muhajirin wa-Ansar Alliance	(Syria) Syrian Arab Republic; Iran	Defeat
2014 Israel–Gaza conflict (8 July 2014 – 26 August 2014)	Gaza Strip; Hamas; Palestinian Islamic Jihad; Popular Front for the Liberation of Palestine; Democratic Front for the Liberation of Palestine; Popular Resistance Committees; Abdullah Azzam Brigades; Jaysh al-Ummah; Al-Aqsa Martyrs' Brigades	Israel	Indecisive
Battle of Arsal (2014) (2 August 2014 – 7 August 2014)	Al-Nusra Front; Islamic State	Lebanon; Hezbollah (Syria) Syrian Arab Republic	Defeat
Operation Indian Ocean (16 August 2014 – 2015)	Al-Shabaab	Federal Government of Somalia: Jubaland; Ahlu Sunna Waljama'a; AMISOM; United States; Supported by: EUTM Somalia	Defeat
2014 Quneitra offensive (27 August 2014 – 23 September 2014)	SRCC: Free Syrian Army; Islamic Front; Al-Nusra Front	(Syria) Syrian Arab Republic: Syrian Armed Forces; National Defense Forces; (United Nations) UNDOF	Victory
American-led intervention in Syria (11 years, 11 months, 1 week and 5 days)	Islamic State (2013–present) Al-Qaeda: Al-Nusra Front (2014–2017); Khorasan group (2014–2017); Rouse the Believers Operations Room (2018–2020); Hurras Al-Din (2018–2025); Jund Al-Aqsa (2014–17); Turkistan Islamic Party (2014–2025)	CJTF–OIR; United States; Turkey (Syrian opposition) Free Syrian Army (2011–present); Supported by: United Kingdom; France; Former participants: Canada (2014–16); Bahrain (2014–16); Belgium (2014–17); Germany (2015–22); Saudi Arabia (2014–2018); United Arab Emirates (2014–2018); Qatar (2014–16); Morocco (2014–16); Australia (2014–17); Netherlands (2014–19); Denmark (2016–23); Italy (2018); Local ground forces Syrian Democratic Forces: YPG; YPJ; Syriac Military Council; Al-Sanadid Forces; Euphrates Volcano (2014–15); Ba'athist Syria (surrendered); Russia (until 8 December 2024); Hezbollah; Iran (until 6 December 2024); Supported by: Islamic Resistance in Iraq; Popular Mobilization Forces; Kata'ib Hezbollah (limited 2019 and 2021 strikes); Syrian Salvation Government (2017–2024): Ahrar Al-Sham (Nov. 2014–2025 airstrikes, intentionality disputed); Tahrir Al-Sham (2017–2025); Jaysh Al-Sunna (2015–2017)	Ongoing
Al-Nusra Front–SRF/Hazzm Movement conflict (26 October 2014 – 1 March 2015)	Al-Nusra Front; Jund Al-Aqsa; Ahrar Al-Sham; Levant Front; Supported by: Knights of Justice Brigade (alleged)	Free Syrian Army: Syrian Revolutionaries Front; Hazzm Movement; Syrian Salvation Front; Ansar Brigades	Victory
2014 Idlib city raid (27 October 2014)	Al-Nusra Front; Jund Al-Aqsa; Islamic State (alleged); Supported by: Sleeper cells within the city	(Syria) Syrian Arab Republic: Syrian Armed Forces; National Defense Force	Defeat
Battle of Al-Shaykh Maskin (1 November 2014 – 15 December 2014)	Free Syrian Army; Islamic Front; Al-Nusra Front	(Syria) Syrian Arab Republic; Syrian Armed Forces; National Defence Force; Hezbollah; Kata'ib Sayyid Al-Shuhada; Supported by: Iran; Islamic Revolutionary Guard Corps	Victory
2014 hostage rescue operations in Yemen ( 26 November 2014 and 6 December 2014)	Al-Qaeda in the Arabian Peninsula	United States; Yemen	Indecisive
Daraa offensive (January 2015) (24 January 2015 – 31 January 2015)	Free Syrian Army; Islamic Front; Al-Nusra Front	(Syria) Syrian Arab Republic: Syrian Armed Forces; Syrian Army; National Defence Force; Hezbollah; Supported by: Iran: Islamic Revolutionary Guard Corps	Victory
Battle of Bosra (2015) (21 March 2015 – 24 March 2015)	Free Syrian Army; Youth of Sunna Forces; Islamic Muthanna Movement; Al-Nusra Front	(Syria) Syrian Arab Republic: Syrian Arab Army; National Defense Force; Druze militias Hezbollah; Lions of Hussein; Islamic Revolutionary Guard Corps; Imam Ali Brigades	Victory
Second Battle of Idlib (24 March 2015 – 28 March 2015)	Army of Conquest: Al-Nusra Front; Ahrar Al-Sham; Sham Legion; Jaysh Al-Sunna; Liwa Al-Haqq; Ajnad ash-Sham; Ajnad Al-Kavkaz; Farouq Brigades	(Ba'athist Syria) Syrian Arab Republic: Syrian Armed Forces; National Defense Force; Hezbollah	Victory
2015 Idlib offensive (24 March 2015 – 5 April 2015)	Army of Conquest; Al-Nusra Front; Freemen of the Levant; Sham Legion; Army of the Sunnah; Truth Brigade; Soldiers of al-Aqsa; Soldiers of the Levant; Strangers of the Levant; Soldiers of the Caucasus; Turkistan Islamic Party; Farouq Brigades; Xhemati Alban	(Ba'athist Syria) Syrian Government; Syrian Armed Forces; Syrian Arab Army; National Defense Forces; Hezbollah; Russia	Partial Victory
Siege of al-Fu'ah and Kafriya (28 March 2015 – 19 July 2018 (3 years, 3 months and 3 weeks))	Hay'at Tahrir al-Sham (2017–18); Army of Conquest (2015–17); Al-Nusra Front; Jaysh al-Sunna; Turkistan Islamic Party in Syria; Ajnad al-Sham; Liwa al-Haqq; Sham Legion (left the Army of Conquest in July 2016); Jund al-Aqsa (Note: Jund al-Aqsa left the Army of Conquest in October 2015, rejoined al-Nusra in October 2016, left again in January 2017.); Ahrar ash-Sham (Syrian Liberation Front since February 2018) (Syrian opposition) Free Syrian Army	(Syria) Syrian Arab Republic; Iran; Allied militias: Hezbollah; Quwat Al-Ridha; Kata'ib Hezbollah	Victory
Abyan campaign (March–August 2015) (26 March 2015 – 11 August 2015)	AQAP	Supreme Political Council: Houthi fighters; Yemeni Republican Guard; Cabinet of Yemen: Republic of Yemen Armed Forces; People's Committees; Popular resistance; Supported by: (South Yemen) Southern Movement; Arab coalition: Saudi Arabia (leader); Bahrain; Egypt; Jordan; Kuwait; Morocco; Sudan; United Arab Emirates	Partial Defeat
Shabwah campaign (March–August 2015) (29 March 2015 – 15 April 2015)	Cabinet of Yemen: Security Forces (pro-Hadi); Southern Movement; People's Committees; Popular resistance; Supported by Arab Coalition: Saudi Arabia (leader); Bahrain; Egypt; Jordan; Kuwait; Morocco; Sudan; United Arab Emirates; AQAP	(Yemen) Supreme Revolutionary Committee: Houthi fighters; Security Forces (pro-Saleh); Yemeni Republican Guard	Defeat
Battle of Nasib Border Crossing (1 April 2015)	Free Syrian Army; Al-Nusra Front	(Syria) Syrian Arab Republic: Syrian Armed Forces; National Defense Force	Victory
Battle of Yarmouk Camp (2015) (1 April 2015 – 20 April 2015)	Islamic State of Iraq and the Levant Al-Nusra Front	Jaysh Al-Islam; Free Syrian Army; Aknaf Bait Al-Maqdis (surrendered) (Syria) Syrian Arab Republic: Armed Forces; Palestine Liberation Army; PFLP-GC; Fatah Al-Intifada; PPSF	Partial Victory
Battle of Mukalla (2 April 2015 – 16 April 2015)	Al-Qaeda: AQAP	Yemen Army: People's Committees; Popular resistance; Hadhramaut Tribal Alliance	Victory
Siege of Taiz (15 April 2015 – present)	Al-Qaeda in the Arabian Peninsula: Ansar Al-Sharia	Supreme Revolutionary Committee/Supreme Political Council: Houthi fighters; Security Forces (pro-Saleh) (2015–2017); Republican Guard (2015–2017); Cabinet of Yemen: Security Forces (pro-Hadi); Islah fighters; People's Committees; Popular resistance; Salafist militias (from late 2015); Arab Coalition: Saudi Arabia (leader); Qatar (2015–17); Bahrain; Egypt; Jordan; Morocco (2015–19); Sudan (2015–19); United Arab Emirates	Ongoing
Battle of Leego (2015) (26 June 2015)	Al-Shabaab	AMISOM Burundi	Strategic Victory
Aleppo offensive (July 2015) (2–7 July 2015)	Fatah Halab: Levant Front; Free Syrian Army; Ansar Al-Sharia: Al-Nusra Front; Jabhat Ansar Al-Din; Ansar al Khilafah; Mujahideen al Islam Movement; Al Tawhid Wal Jihad Brigade	(Syria) Syrian Arab Republic: Syrian Armed Forces; National Defense Force; Ba'ath Brigades; Al-Quds Brigade; Hezbollah	Partial Victory
Battle of Zabadani (2015) (3 July – 24 September 2015)	Syrian Opposition; Jaysh al-Haramoun; Al-Nusra Front; Ahrar ash-Sham; Free Syrian Army; Islamic Front (Joined August 15)	(Syria) Syrian Government; Iran; Syrian Social Nationalist Party; Hezbollah; Al-Jabalawi Battalion; Palestine Liberation Army	Ceasefire
Al-Ghab offensive (July–August 2015) (28 July – 28 August 2015)	SRCC: Free Syrian Army; Islamic Front; Alwiya Al-Furqan; Army of Mujahideen; Supported by: Turkey; Saudi Arabia; Qatar; Army of Conquest: Al-Nusra Front; Ahrar Al-Sham; Sham Legion; Jaysh Al-Sunna; Liwa Al-Haqq; Jund Al-Aqsa; Ajnad ash-Sham; Ghuraba Al-Sham; Independent Jihadist groups: Imam Bukhari Jamaat; Ajnad Al-Kavkaz; Junud Al-Sham; Jabhat Ansar Al-Din; Turkistan Islamic Party; Katibat Al-Tawhid wal-Jihad	(Syria) Syrian Arab Republic: Syrian Arab Armed Forces; National Defence Forces; Hezbollah; Syrian Social Nationalist Party; Syrian Resistance; Liwa Fatemiyoun; Lions of Hussein Brigade; Supported by: Iran: Islamic Revolutionary Guard Corps; Quds Force	Victory
Russian military intervention in the Syrian Civil War (30 September 2015 – 8 December 2024) (9 years, 2 months, 1 week and 1 day)	Syrian opposition: Syrian Salvation Government; Tahrir al-Sham (2017–2025); (Syrian opposition) Syrian Interim Government; (Syrian opposition) Free Syrian Army; (Syrian opposition) Syrian National Army; Supported by: Supported by: Turkey Qatar Ukraine United States (2015–2017); Islamic State Al-Qaeda: Al-Nusra Front (2013–2016); Jabhat Fath al-Sham (2016–2017); Jund al-Aqsa (2017–2018); Guardians of Religion (2018–2025)	Russia; Iran; Syrian Arab Republic; Humanitarian support: Armenia Syrian Democratic Forces (2016–2017, 2017–2024)	Partial victory
Aleppo offensive (October–December 2015) (16 October – 21 December 2015)	SRCC; Free Syrian Army; Islamic Front; Alwiya al-Furqan; Army of Mujahedeen; Harakat Nour al-Din al-Zenki (until late Jan. 2016); Supported by: Turkey; Saudi Arabia; Qatar; United States; Al-Nusra Front; Turkistan Islamic Party in Syria; Caucasus Emirate	(Syria) Syrian Arab Republic; Iran; Iranian-backed Militias; Kata'ib Hezbollah; Harakat al-Nujaba; Liwa Abu al-Fadhal al-Abbas; Liwa Fatemiyoun; Al-Badr Brigades; Ammar Brigade; LAAG Hezbollah Air strikes: Russia; Islamic State (since 23 Oct.)	Defeat
2015 Latakia offensive (15 October 2015 – 12 March 2016)	Free Syrian Army Islamic Front; Al-Nusra Front; Turkistan Islamic Party in Syria (TIP); Katibat Jabal Al-Islam; Supported by: Turkey	(Syria) Syrian Arab Republic: Syrian Armed Forces; Syrian Social Nationalist Party; Syrian Resistance; Hezbollah; LAAG; Lions of Hussein Brigade Russia (air strikes): Russian Air Force; Military advisors	Defeat
2015 Hama offensive (28 November – 15 December 2015)	Jund Al-Aqsa; Army of Conquest: Al-Nusra Front; Ahrar ash-Sham; Free Syrian Army: Army of Victory; Falcons of Al-Ghab	Syrian Arab Republic: Syrian Armed Forces; National Defense Force; Quwat Al-Ghadab; Khaybar Brigade; Air strikes: Russia: Russian Air Force	Defeat
Fall of Zinjibar and Jaar (2–3 December 2015)	Al-Qaeda in the Arabian Peninsula	(Yemen) Popular Committees and Popular resistance Southern Movement	Victory
Southern Abyan Offensive (2016) (20 February 2016)	Islamic Emirate of Yemen: Al-Qaeda in the Arabian Peninsula	Yemen: People's Committees; Popular resistance	Victory
Idlib insurgency (2016–2024)	Islamic State; Support: Jund Al-Aqsa (until 2017); Liwa Dawud (until 2014) Al-Qaeda: Hurras ad-Deen; Allies: Ansar Al-Tawhid (sometimes, until 2020)	Syrian Government and loyalists Supported by: Russia (Syrian opposition) Syrian Salvation Government: Hayat Tahrir Al-Sham; Jaysh Al-Izza; Jaysh Al-Ahrar; Army of Conquest (dissolved in 2017): Ahrar Al-Sham (2015-2017); National Front for Liberation: Syrian Liberation Front; Nour Al-Din Al-Zenki Movement; Ahrar Al-Sham; Sham Legion; Free Idlib Army; Jabhat Thuwar Saraqib; Turkey	Partial Victory/Defeat

=== 2020s ===
Battle	Allies	Opponents	Outcome
Boulikessi and Mondoro attacks (January 24, 2021)	Jama'at Nasr Al-Islam wal Muslimin	Mali; France	Defeat
Bodio ambush (February 2021 – May 25, 2022)	Ansarul Islam; Jama'at Nasr Al-Islam wal Muslimin	Burkina Faso: Burkina Faso Armed Forces; Volunteers for the Defense of the Homeland	Victory
Siege of Madjoari (February 2021 – May 25, 2022)	Ansarul Islam; Jama'at Nasr Al-Islam wal Muslimin	Burkina Faso: Burkina Faso Armed Forces; Volunteers for the Defense of the Homeland	Victory
2021 Boni attack (3 February 2021)	Jama'at Nasr Al-Islam wal Muslimin	Mali; France	Defeat
Battle of Marib (22 February 2021 – 1 April 2022)	Cabinet of Yemen: Security Forces; Islah party AQAP; Saudi Arabia According to Houthi media and officials: (Islamic State) ISIL-YP	(Yemen) Revolutionary Committee/Supreme Political Council: Houthi movement; Supported by: Iran: IRGC	Ceasefire
2021 Aguelhok attack (April 2, 2021)	Jama'at Nasr Al-Islam wal Muslimin	MINUSMA: Chad	Defeat
2021 Taliban offensive (1 May – 15 August 2021)	Taliban; Haqqani network; Pakistani Taliban; Al-Qaeda; Jamaat Ansarullah	Islamic Republic of Afghanistan; United States	Victory
Battle of Wisil (June 27, 2021)	Al-Shabaab	Somali National Army; Galmudug Derwishes	Defeat
Torodi ambush (July 31, 2021)	Jama'at Nasr Al-Islam wal-Muslimin	Niger	Victory
Dounkoun ambush (August 8, 2021)	Jama'at Nasr Al-Islam wal Muslimin	Burkina Faso	Victory
2021 Golweyn ambush (10 August 2021)	Al-Shabaab	AMISOM: Uganda	Defeat
Fall of Kabul (2021) (15 August 2021)	Taliban; Al-Qaeda	Afghanistan; Supported by: United States	Victory
Boukouma attack (August 18, 2021)	Jama'at Nasr Al-Islam wal Muslimin	Burkina Faso	Indecisive
Battle of Amara (2021) (August 24, 2021)	Al-Shabaab	Somali Army; AFRICOM (airstrike only)	Defeat
Nokara ambush (19 August 2021)	Jama'at Nasr Al-Islam wal Muslimin	Mali	Victory
Siege of Madjoari (6 October 2021)	Jama'at Nasr Al-Islam wal Muslimin	Mali	Victory
2021 Inata attack (November 14, 2021)	Jama'at Nasr Al-Islam wal Muslimin; Ansarul Islam	Burkina Faso	Victory
Titao ambush (December 23, 2021)	Jama'at Nasr Al-Islam wal Muslimin; Ansarul Islam	Burkina Faso: Volunteers for the Defense of the Homeland	Victory
Archam clashes (February 18–19, 2022)	Unknown jihadists: Jama'at Nasr Al-Islam wal Muslimin; Islamic State in the Greater Sahara	Mali: Malian Air Force	Defeat
Operation Laabingol (January 16–23, 2022)	Jama'at Nasr Al-Islam wal Muslimin; Ansarul Islam	Burkina Faso; France	Defeat
Siege of Djibo (16/17 February 2022 – present)	Ansar ul Islam; Al-Qaeda: Jama'at Nasr Al-Islam wal Muslimin (JNIM)	Burkina Faso; France (until February 2023)	Ongoing
2022 Mondoro attack (4 March 2022)	Jama'at Nasr Al-Islam wal Muslimin	Malian Armed Forces	Victory
Ménaka offensive (March 8, 2022 – May 2023)	Platform: Movement for the Salvation of Azawad; Imghad Tuareg Self-Defense Group and Allies; Mali; Takuba Task Force (until June 2022): France; Czech Republic; Wagner Group (from June 2022): Niger (from March 2023); Jama'at Nasr Al-Islam wal Muslimin	Islamic State in the Greater Sahara	Defeat
2022 Natiaboani ambush (March 20, 2022)	Unknown jihadists: Jama'at Nasr Al-Islam wal Muslimin (per ACLED)	Burkina Faso	Inconclusive
Moura massacre (27 March 2022 – 31 March 2022)	Al-Qaeda in the Islamic Maghreb: Jama'at Nasr Al-Islam wal Muslimin	Mali Armed Forces; Wagner Group	Defeat
2022 Al-Shabaab invasion of Ethiopia (20 July – c. early August 2022)	Al-Qaeda: Al-Shabaab	Ethiopia: Somali Region	Victory
Bourzanga attack (May 21, 2022)	Jama'at Nasr Al-Islam wal Muslimin	Burkina Faso; France	Defeat
Battle of Talataye (2022) (6–7 September 2022)	Movement for the Salvation of Azawad Jama'at Nasr Al-Islam wal Muslimin	Islamic State: Sahel Province	Defeat
Battle of Bal'ad (2022) (October 7, 2022)	Al-Qaeda: Al-Shabaab	Somalia	Defeat
Siege of the Villa Rossa Hotel (November 27–28, 2022)	Al-Shabaab	Somalia	Defeat
Northwestern Syria clashes (December 2022 – November 2024) (2 December 2022- 27 November 2024)	Syrian opposition; Syrian Salvation Government; Al-Fateh al-Mubin Operations Room; Hay'at Tahrir al-Sham; Muawiyah bin Abu Sufyan Brigade; Sa'd ibn Abi Waqqas Brigade; Ibn al-Walid battalions; (Syrian opposition) Syrian Interim Government; National Front for Liberation; Ahrar al-Sham; Sham Legion; Suqour al-Sham; Turkistan Islamic Party in Syria; Ansar al Tawhid; So Be Steadfast Operations Room; Hurras al-Din; Ansar al-Din Front; Jihad Coordination; Ansar Fighters Brigade	(Ba'athist Syria) Syrian Arab Republic; Syrian Armed Forces; Syrian Arab Army; Republican Guard; National Defence Forces; Local Defence Forces; Baqir Brigade; Hezbollah; Liwa Fatemiyoun; Russia	Inconclusive
December 2022 Ménaka region clashes (December 3–10, 2022)	Jama'at Nasr Al-Islam wal Muslimin	Islamic State in the Greater Sahara	Inconclusive
Battle of Runirgod (December 12–22, 2022)	Al-Shabaab	Somali Army: Macawisley	Defeat
Hilowle Gaab attack (January 6, 2023)	Al-Shabaab	Somalia; Ma'awisley	al-Shabaab tactical victory Somali strategic victory
Diafarabé and Koumara attacks (January 10, 2023)	Jama'at Nasr Al-Islam wal Muslimin	Mali; Wagner Group	Inconclusive
Battle of Hawadley (January 17–19, 2023)	Al-Shabaab	Somalia: Somali National Army; NISA	Defeat
Battle of Buulo Mareer (26 May 2023)	Al-Shabaab	ATMIS; Uganda	Victory
April 2023 Aorema attack (April 15, 2023)	Jama'at Nasr Al-Islam wal Muslimin	Burkina Faso: Burkina Faso Armed Forces; Volunteers for the Defense of the Homeland	Indecisive
Battle of Ougarou (April 17, 2023)	Jama'at Nasr Al-Islam wal Muslimin	Burkina Faso: Burkina Faso Armed Forces; Volunteers for the Defense of the Homeland	Indecisive
Noaka attack (June 26, 2023)	Jama'at Nasr Al-Islam wal Muslimin	Volunteers for the Defense of the Homeland	Indecisive
2023 Namsiguia ambush (June 26, 2023)	Jama'at Nasr Al-Islam wal Muslimin: Katiba Hanifa	Burkina Faso	Indecisive
Siege of Timbuktu (8 August 2023 – present)	Jama'at Nasr Al-Islam wal Muslimin	Mali; Wagner Group (alleged by JNIM)	Ongoing
Battle of Ber (2023) (August 11–12, 2023)	CMA: MNLA; HCUA; MAA; JNIM	Mali; Wagner Group MINUSMA: Burkina Faso	Defeat
Tombouctou and Bamba attacks (September 7, 2023)	Jama'at Nasr Al-Islam wal Muslimin	Mali	Victory
2023 Koutougou attack (August 15, 2023)	Jama'at Nasr Al-Islam wal Muslimin	Niger	Indecisive
Niafunké attack (November 24, 2023)	Jama'at Nasr Al-Islam wal Muslimin	Mali	Victory
Kwala attack (February 28, 2024)	Jama'at Nasr Al-Islam wal Muslimin	Mali	Victory
2023 Farabougou attack (December 12, 2023)	Jama'at Nasr Al-Islam wal Muslimin: Katiba Macina	Mali; Local dozo hunters	Victory
Tawori attack (March 31, 2024)	Jama'at Nasr Al-Islam wal Muslimin	Burkina Faso: Volunteers for the Defense of the Homeland; Defense and Security Forces	Victory
Battle of the Wagadou Forest (2024) (April 5, 2024)	Jama'at Nasr Al-Islam wal Muslimin	CSP-DPA: MNLA; HCUA; MAA	Indecisive
Mourdiah attack (26 May 2024)	Jama'at Nasr Al-Islam wal Muslimin	Mali; Wagner Group	Defeat
2024 El Dher attack (8 June 2024)	Al-Shabaab	Somalia; Galmudug ATMIS; Supported by: US	Inconclusive
Mansila attack (June 11, 2024)	Jama'at Nasr Al-Islam wal Muslimin	Burkina Faso	Victory
Battle of Tinzaouaten (2024) (25–27 July 2024)	CSP-DPA: MNLA; HCUA; MAA; GATIA 2; Jama'at Nasr Al-Islam wal-Muslimin	Wagner Group; Mali	Victory
Nassougou attack (August 8, 2024)	Jama'at Nasr Al-Islam wal Muslimin	Burkina Faso: Rapid Intervention Battalions; BIR 1; BIR 5; Volunteers for the Defense of the Homeland	Victory
Battle of Koumbri (September 4, 2023)	Jama'at Nasr Al-Islam wal Muslimin	Burkina Faso: Burkina Faso Armed Forces; 12th Infantry Commando Regiment; Volunteers for the Defense of the Homeland	Indecisive
Kidal offensive (October 2, 2023 – December 20, 2023)	JNIM	Mali; Wagner Group CSP-PSD: MNLA; HCUA; MAA; GATIA (al-Mahmoud faction)	Defeat
March 2025 Diapaga attack (March 28, 2025)	Jama'at Nasr Al-Islam wal Muslimin	Burkina Faso Armed Forces: VDP; 27th BIR	Victory
2025 Dioura attack (June 1, 2025)	Jama'at Nasr Al-Islam wal Muslimin	Malian Armed Forces	Victory
2025 Timbuktu attack (June 2, 2025)	Jama'at Nasr Al-Islam wal Muslimin	Malian Army; Wagner Group	Indecisive
Battle of Boulikessi (2025) (June 1, 2025)	Jama'at Nasr Al-Islam wal Muslimin: AQAP	Malian Army; Wagner Group	Victory
2026 Mali attacks (April 25, 2025 — present)	Jama'at Nasr Al-Islam wal Muslimin; Azawad Liberation Front	Malian Army; Africa Corps (alleged)	Ongoing

== See also ==
- List of wars and battles involving ISIL
