= Sorgha attack =

2023 attack in Burkina Faso

- Part of Jihadist insurgency in Burkina Faso
- Location: Sorgha, Bogande Department, Gnagna Province, Est Region, Burkina Faso
- Date: July 5, 2023
- Target: Civilians
- Deaths: 15
- Injuries: Unknown
- Perpetrator: Jama'at Nusrat al-Islam wal Muslimin

On July 5, 2023, militants suspected to be from Jama'at Nusrat al-Islam wal-Muslimin (JNIM) attacked the village of Sorgha, Gnagna Province, Burkina Faso, killing at least 15 civilians.

== Background ==
Violence by jihadist groups increased exponentially since the September 2022 Burkina Faso coup d'état that overthrew putschist Paul-Henri Sandaogo Damiba, who came to power in a coup that January. Much of the violence was caused by the al-Qaeda-aligned Jama'at Nasr al-Islam wal-Muslimin and its affiliates in Burkina Faso and the Islamic State – Sahil Province, which have besieged towns and launched deadly attacks on Burkinabe soldiers and pro-government militiamen.

A week prior to the Sorgha attack, JNIM killed over 33 Burkinabe militiamen at Noaka, and another 34 at Namssiguia.

== Attack ==
Early on the morning of July 5, suspected JNIM militants on motorcycles entered the village of Sorgha and began shooting at residents. The jihadists torched houses, granaries, and shops in the village before fleeing. Several people injured in the attack were evacuated to a hospital in Bogandé. After the attack, residents of Sorgha and the neighboring village of Nindangou began fleeing en masse to Bogande and other cities, in fear of another jihadist attack. The Burkinabe government said that "security operations are underway".

At least 15 people were killed in the attack, according to local and Burkinabe government sources. Women were among the dead. The number of injured civilians is unknown.
