= Kogsablogo attack =

2023 attack in Burkina Faso

- Part of Islamist insurgency in Burkina Faso
Date	July 7, 2023
Location	Kogsablogo, Namentenga Province, Burkina Faso
Result	JNIM victory

Belligerents
Burkina Faso: Volunteers for the Defense of the Homeland	Jama'at Nusrat al-Islam wal Muslimin

Casualties and losses
15-16 killed	"Some" killed (per Burkina Faso)
- 2 civilians killed

On July 7, 2023, sixteen members of the Volunteers for the Defense of the Homeland (VDP) were killed in a battle with Jama'at Nusrat al-Islam wal-Muslimin (JNIM) at the village of Kogsablogo, near Boulsa, Namentenga Province, Burkina Faso.

== Background ==
Violence by jihadist groups increased exponentially since the September 2022 Burkina Faso coup d'état that overthrew putschist Paul-Henri Sandaogo Damiba, who came to power in a coup that January. Much of the violence was caused by the al-Qaeda-aligned Jama'at Nusrat al-Islam wal-Muslimin and its affiliates in Burkina Faso and the Islamic State – Sahel Province, which have besieged towns and launched deadly attacks on Burkinabe soldiers and pro-government militiamen.

On June 26, a week prior to the Boulsa attack, an ambush on VDP in Noaka killed at least 33 militiamen and 50 jihadists. The Kogsablogo attack occurred on the same day as the killing of four VDP in Fo, in Houet Province.

== Attack ==
The attack took place at the village of Kogsablogo, near Boulsa, the capital of Namentenga Province. Little is known about how the attack transpired, although sixteen VDP militiamen were killed in the attack along with two civilians. The militants stormed the village and burned homes and shops. A security source within the Burkinabe government told Agence France-Presse that "some" of the attackers had been killed.

Jama'at Nusrat al-Islam wal-Muslimin did not claim the attack until July 11, and they said that 15 VDP were killed.
