= 2023 Namsiguia ambush =

2023 battle in Burkina Faso

- Part of Jihadist insurgency in Burkina Faso
Date	June 26, 2023
Location	Namsiguia, Bam Province, Burkina Faso
Result	Indecisive

Belligerents
Burkina Faso: Burkina Faso Armed Forces; Volunteers for the Defense of the Homeland	Jama'at Nasr al-Islam wal Muslimin

Casualties and losses
34 killed 20 injured 10 missing	40 killed (per Burkina Faso)

On June 26, 2023, jihadists from Jama'at Nasr al-Islam wal-Muslimin ambushed a Burkinabe convoy near Namssiguia, Bam Province, Burkina Faso. The attack and subsequent battle killed 34 Burkinabe soldiers, with Burkinabe authorities stating over 40 jihadists were killed.

== Background ==
Violence by jihadist groups increased exponentially since the September 2022 Burkina Faso coup d'état that overthrew putschist Paul-Henri Sandaogo Damiba, who came to power in a coup that January. Much of the violence was caused by the al-Qaeda-aligned Jama'at Nasr al-Islam wal-Muslimin and its affiliates in Burkina Faso and the Islamic State – Sahil Province, which have besieged towns and launched deadly attacks on Burkinabe soldiers and pro-government militiamen.

Namsiguia had previously been a target of jihadists, with a bombing in August 2022 killing 15 Burkinabe soldiers. An attack on civilians in the town in January killed nine people.

== Attack ==
At the time of the attack, the convoy was returning from the besieged city of Djibo, which had been blockaded by jihadist groups including JNIM since 2022. In a press release, Burkinabe authorities stated that the fighting between the two groups after the attack was violent. The Burkinabe government stated that 31 soldiers and three pro-government VDP militiamen were killed, and twenty more were injured. Around ten others were reported missing as well. The statement also claimed forty jihadists were killed.

The Namsiguia convoy attack occurred the same day as jihadists stormed a VDP base in Noaka, killing over thirty VDPs.
