= Boukouma attack =

2021 battle against jihadists in Burkina Faso

- Part of Jihadist insurgency in Burkina Faso
Date	August 18, 2021
Location	Boukouma, Seno Province, Burkina Faso
Result	Indecisive

Belligerents
Burkina Faso	Jama'at Nasr al-Islam wal Muslimin

Casualties and losses
21 killed	58 killed (per Burkinabe government)
- 65 civilians killed

On August 18, 2021, jihadists from Jama'at Nasr al-Islam wal-Muslimin ambushed a convoy of Burkinabe soldiers and civilians near Boukouma, Séno Province, Burkina Faso. The ambush sparked clashes between the jihadists and the soldiers, leaving dozens dead on both sides. At least 65 civilians were killed in the ambush as well.

== Background ==
Since 2015, north and northeastern Burkina Faso has been embroiled in an insurgency by the Mali-based Jama'at Nasr al-Islam wal-Muslimin, the Niger-based Islamic State in the Greater Sahara, and the homegrown Burkinabe Ansarul Islam. In April 2021, jihadists killed eighteen civilians in the Yattakou massacre in Seno province, where Boukouma is located. Just two weeks before the attack Boukouma, ISGS jihadists attacked Burkinabe forces and civilians in neighboring Oudalan Province, killing 11 civilians and 19 soldiers.

== Attack ==
At the time of the attack, Burkinabe soldiers were escorting a convoy of civilians in Seno Province. The convoy was leaving Dori and headed to Arbinda, and was ambushed in the village of Boukouma around 2pm on August 18. The convoy was made up of eighty vehicles and stretched for 600 meters, many of the civilians vehicles going in the convoy to bypass jihadist checkpoints along the road. The gendarmes were positioned at the front and back of the convoy, with no defenses in the center. The jihadists ambushed the convoy in the center, with gendarmes responding immediately. After three hours of fighting, the jihadists were repelled from the convoy.

An initial toll from the Burkinabe government stated that 30 civilians, 14 Burkinabe soldiers, and three VDP militiamen were killed and nineteen others were injured. The next day, this toll was revised to over 80 people killed including 65 civilians, 15 gendarmes, and 6 militiamen. Burkinabe officials also stated that 58 jihadists were killed in a counter-attack.

President Roch Marc Christian Kaboré declared a three-day period of national mourning. Jama'at Nasr al-Islam wal-Muslimin claimed responsibility for the attack on August 22, and released images of captured weapons and motorcycles from the convoy.
