= Nassougou attack =

2024 battle in Burkina Faso

- Part of Islamist insurgency in Burkina Faso
Date	August 8, 2024
Location	Nassougou, Burkina Faso
Result	JNIM victory

Belligerents
Burkina Faso: Rapid Intervention Battalions; BIR 1; BIR 5; Volunteers for the Defense of the Homeland	Jama'at Nasr al-Islam wal Muslimin

Strength
~1,000 soldiers 1 helicopter	Unknown

Casualties and losses
150–200 killed 116 vehicles destroyed (per JNIM)	Unknown

On August 8, 2024, a convoy of Burkinabe army vehicles headed to Fada N'Gourma from Diapaga were ambushed by militants from Jama'at Nasr al-Islam wal Muslimin (JNIM), killing between 150 and 200 Burkinabe soldiers and militiamen. While the Burkinabe junta has not released a statement confirming the death toll, the attack marks the deadliest incident against Burkinabe soldiers since the start of the jihadist insurgency in Burkina Faso.

== Background ==
Violence by jihadist groups increased exponentially since the September 2022 Burkina Faso coup d'état that overthrew putschist Paul-Henri Sandaogo Damiba, who came to power in a coup that January. Much of the violence was caused by the al-Qaeda-aligned Jama'at Nasr al-Islam wal-Muslimin (JNIM) and its affiliates in Burkina Faso and the Islamic State – Sahil Province, which have besieged towns and launched deadly attacks on Burkinabe soldiers and pro-government militiamen.

In early July, a convoy of traders escorted by the Burkinabe Army left Fada N'Gourma, Est Region with the aim of supplying Diapaga. The two towns were 150 kilometers apart, but the convoy followed an arc bending north to supply other towns along the way. Slowed down by the explosions of several landmines, the convoy reached Diapaga on the night between July 15 and 16. It continued further towards Partiaga, twenty-five kilometers southwest, to supply the area with reinforcements. The convoy then continued further towards Tawori, near the village of Kalbouli and the Boungou gold mine.

The convoy began its return journey in early August, taking a different route through Ougarou, which was the fastest route to Fada N'Gourma. The road passed through a forest controlled by jihadists from JNIM, and hadn't been in use since a November 2019 attack that left 39 people dead.

== Attack ==
At the time of the return, the convoy consisted of about 1,000 men from various parts of the Burkinabe Armed Forces. Soldiers from BIR1 and BIR5 of the Rapid Intervention Battalions were present along with militiamen from the VDP. A Burkinabe security source attested that around 500 of the men were from the BIRs.

Several small groups of jihadists launched the attack on the convoy on August 8, between 3 pm and 4 pm in the village of Nassougou. The helicopter escorting the convoy was forced to ascend to avoid gunfire, and could hardly retaliate. The traders and wounded in the convoy consolidated near the back of the convoy before heading to Boungou and Tawori.

A statement by the Burkinabe junta was released on August 11, attempting to spin the attack into a victory. Local security sources, however, reported a large number of dead, wounded, and missing among the soldiers. Dozens of bodies were received by the Fada N'Gourma morgue, which quickly became oversaturated. JNIM also released images of burnt-out trucks and vehicles, large caches of looted weapons, and dead soldiers lying in bushes.

== Aftermath ==
No official death toll has been reported by the Burkinabe army. Sources speaking to RFI stated that the fighting was very violent and dozens of bodies had been found, although the toll could be even higher. Libération reported that local security sources fluctuated between a death toll of 150 and 200, making the attack the worst massacre against Burkinabe soldiers by JNIM since the start of the jihadist insurgency in Burkina Faso.

JNIM claimed the deaths of 140 soldiers, the destruction of 116 vehicles. and the capture of 70 AK-47 rifles and 21 rocket launchers.

On August 13, the Burkinabe junta released a statement with images claiming the destruction of a jihadist base in the area of Nassougou.
