= Battle of Araouane (2009) =

Battle between Malian forces and AQIM in Mali

- Part of the Insurgency in the Maghreb (2002–present)
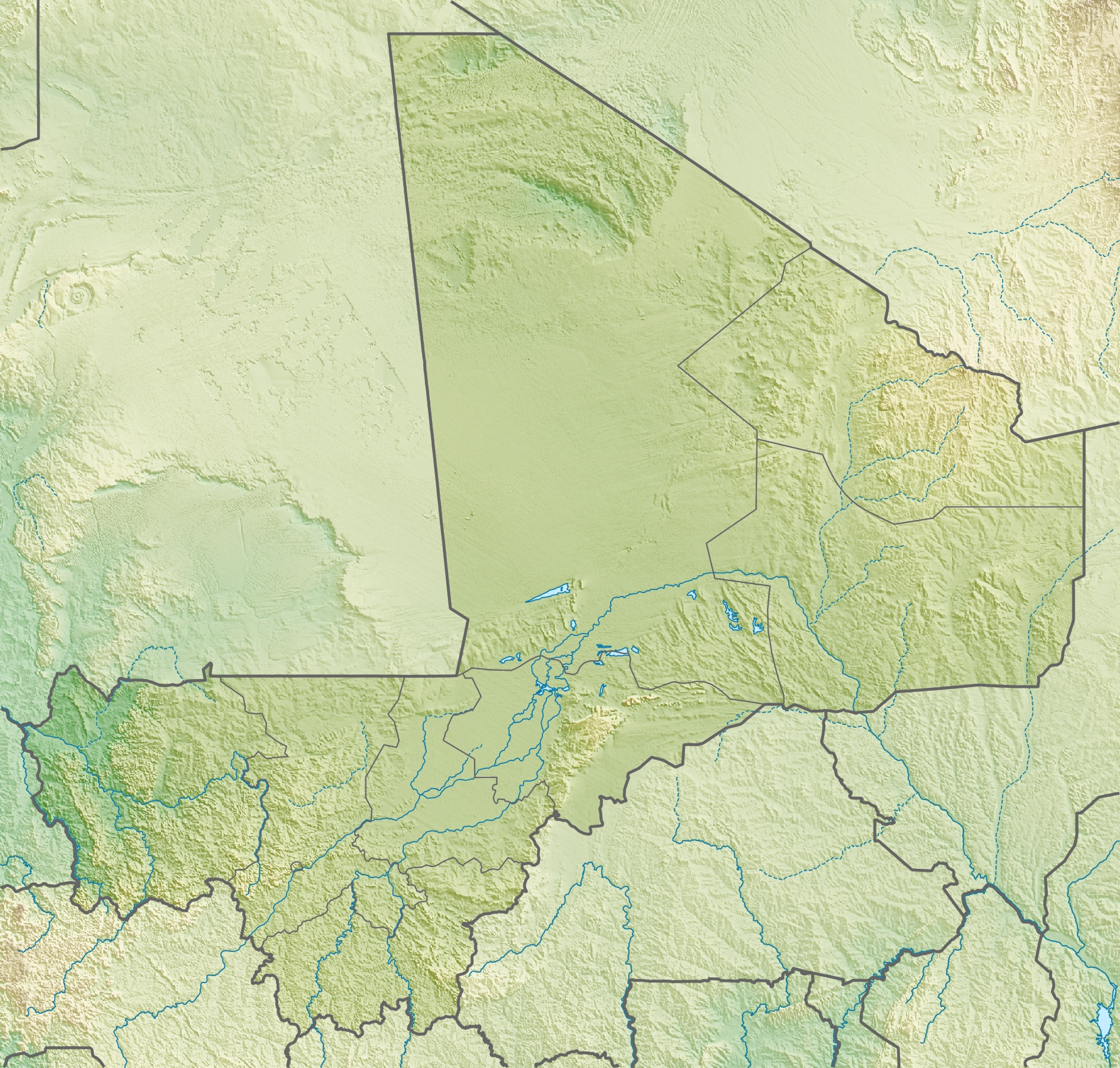
- Battle location (Mali)
Date	July 4, 2009; 17 years ago
Location	near Araouane, Mali 18°54′18″N 3°31′42″W
Result	AQIM and allied victory

Belligerents
Mali	AQIM and affiliated drug traffickers

Commanders and leaders
Hamma Ould Mohamed Yahya (POW)	Unknown

Strength
70 men, 12 pick-ups	~40 men

Casualties and losses
16–28 killed 3–30 prisoners	1–20 killed

On July 4, 2009, clashes broke out between Al-Qaeda in the Islamic Maghreb (AQIM) and Malian forces near Araouane, Mali.

== Background ==
On June 11, 2009, AQIM jihadists assassinated Malian officer Lamana Ould Bou in his home in Timbuktu. Malian forces launched an offensive against AQIM in retaliation for the assassination on June 16, near Garn-Akassa, killing sixteen to twenty-six jihadists.

== Battle ==
On July 3, 2009, American intelligence alerted Malian officials to a drug trafficking convoy in rural northern Tombouctou Region. Hamma Ould Mohamed Yahya, the Malian deputy commander in Tombouctou Region, organized a patrol of seventy men on twelve pick-ups to intersect the convoy. The trafficker's vehicle was spotted by the Malian forces, but managed to escape, although Malian forces killed a machine gunner. Between 3 and 4 a.m. the following night, around forty AQIM jihadists ambushed the Malian soldiers.

The Malian government did not release any information about the ambush, only announcing "very deadly skirmishes" and that "losses were recorded on both sides." Survivors of the battle stated that "of the twelve army vehicles, six were destroyed with their occupants, and the other six were scattered in the desert. We don't yet know who is alive and who is dead." Jeune Afrique reported that the ambush was conducted by AQIM and affiliated drug traffickers. Sixteen Malian soldiers were killed and twenty were taken prisoner, including Yahya. Between one and twenty jihadists were killed as well.

== Aftermath ==
AQIM claimed responsibility for the ambush on July 8, and claimed the deaths of twenty-eight Malian soldiers and capture of three others. AQIM also claimed one Mauritanian within their ranks was killed. Yahya was released in March 2012.
