= Battle of Ougarou =

2023 battle in Burkina Faso

- Part of Jihadist insurgency in Burkina Faso
| Date | April 17, 2023 |
| Location | Ougarou, Est Region, Burkina Faso |
| Result | JNIM victory: Ougarou falls under jihadist control |

Belligerents
| Burkina Faso | Jama'at Nasr al-Islam wal Muslimin: Katiba Hanifa |

Casualties and losses
| 33 killed 12 wounded Unknown missing | 40 killed |

On April 27, 2023, jihadists from the Katiba Hanifa of Jama'at Nasr al-Islam wal-Muslimin launched an attack on Burkinabe forces in Ougarou, Est Region, Burkina Faso. Around 33 Burkinabe soldiers and VDP were killed along with 40 jihadists.

== Background ==
Violence by jihadist groups increased exponentially since the September 2022 Burkina Faso coup d'état that overthrew putschist Paul-Henri Sandaogo Damiba, who came to power in a coup that January. Much of the violence was caused by the al-Qaeda-aligned Jama'at Nasr al-Islam wal-Muslimin and its affiliates in Burkina Faso and the Islamic State – Sahil Province, which have besieged towns and launched deadly attacks on Burkinabe soldiers and pro-government militiamen.

== Battle ==
The Burkinabe military base in Ougarou was attacked on the morning of April 27. Little is known about how the attack developed, but a Burkinabe press release stated that there was "particularly intense" fighting between the jihadists and the soldiers. The press release also stated that the Burkinabe soldiers were overpowered by a larger group of jihadist reinforcements. The reinforcements allowed the jihadists to evacuate wounded comrades.

Burkinabe officials stated that 33 soldiers were killed and twelve were wounded, along with some soldiers missing. They also claimed that at least 40 jihadists were killed or injured before the arrival of reinforcements. No group claimed responsibility for the attack, but the Africa Center for Strategic Studies accused Katiba Hanifa of Jama'at Nasr al-Islam wal-Muslimin of responsibility.
