= Yattakou massacre =

2021 mass murder in Burkina Faso

- Part of Jihadist insurgency in Burkina Faso
- Location: Yattakou, Seno Province, Burkina Faso
- Date: April 26, 2021
- Deaths: 18
- Injuries: 1
- Perpetrator: Islamic State in the Greater Sahara

On April 26, 2021, jihadists from the Islamic State in the Greater Sahara killed eighteen civilians in Yattakou, Seno Province, Burkina Faso, sparking a mass exodus from the area.

== Background ==
Since 2019, northern Burkina Faso has been embroiled in two jihadist insurgencies by the Islamic State in the Greater Sahara and Jama'at Nasr al-Islam wal-Muslimin, both predominantly-Fulani organizations that attack civilians along ethnic and religious lines. The Burkinabe government has increased efforts to combat the insurgencies by recruiting civilian militias known as the Volunteers for the Defense of the Homeland (VDP), although Burkinabe forces and VDP have been accused of killing Fulani civilians en masse. In early April 2021, jihadists killed ten VDP in Gorgadji, Séno Province.

== Massacre ==
The attack in Yattakou occurred on the same day as the killing of two Spanish journalists, an Irish conservationist, and a Burkinabe soldier. Salfo Kabore, the governor of Seno, stated that eighteen civilians were killed in the attack on Yattakou by ISGS fighters, and one seriously injured person was flown to a hospital in Ouagadougou. Kabore stated that many people from the area were displaced throughout the province and to Ouagadougou due to the attack. While the exact number of displaced civilians is unknown, there was an increase in 50,000 displaced people in Sahel Region between April 26, 2021, and May 2021.
