= Bourzanga attack =

2022 battle in Burkina Faso

- Part of Jihadist insurgency in Burkina Faso
Date	May 21, 2022
Location	Bourzanga, Bam Province, Burkina Faso
Result	Franco-Burkinabe victory

Belligerents
Burkina Faso; France	Jama'at Nasr al-Islam wal Muslimin

Strength
100 men	100–200 men

Casualties and losses
5 killed, 10 wounded	35–45 killed

On May 21, 2022, jihadists from Jama'at Nasr al-Islam wal-Muslimin attacked the city of Bourzanga, Burkina Faso, but the attack was repelled by Burkinabe and French forces.

== Background ==
Beginning in 2019 in Arbinda and escalating in late 2021 and early 2022, jihadist groups such as Jama'at Nasr al-Islam wal-Muslimin, Ansarul Islam, and the Islamic State in the Greater Sahara began besieging Burkinabe government-controlled towns in northern and eastern Burkina Faso. Jihadists from Ansarul Islam assaulted the Burkinabe base in the town of Madjoari in southern Burkina Faso on May 19, being repelled with heavy losses. The jihadists captured the town several days later, and massacred dozens of civilians fleeing.

These sieges were ongoing in northern Burkina Faso as well, including in Toeni, Djibo, and Sebba, near Bourzanga.

== Attack ==
Around 100 to 200 militants from JNIM attacked the Burkinabe military base in Bourzanga at 5am on May 21. A Burkinabe security source told RFI that the soldiers at the base were prepared for the attack and had known about the jihadists' plan to attack the base for several days. Around a hundred Burkinabe soldiers and VDP were present in Bourzanga at the time of the attack. The attack was repulsed by French fighter jets from Niamey and Burkinabe helicopters flying over the battlefield and bombing the jihadists.

The Burkinabe general staff gave an initial toll of thirty jihadists killed, which later rose to 35 killed. The bodies of dozens of attackers were presented on national television following the attack. An armored vehicle, forty motorcycles, two pick-ups, and numerous weapons were captured by Burkinabe forces. French officials said dozens of jihadists were killed or injured, and later clarified that 45 jihadists were killed. Five Burkinabe soldiers were killed and ten were injured.
