= Titao ambush =

2021 battle in Burkina Faso

Coordinates: 13.25°N 2.05°W

- Part of Jihadist insurgency in Burkina Faso
Date	December 23, 2021
Location	You, Titao-Ouahigouya road, Loroum Province, Burkina Faso
Result	Jihadist victory

Belligerents
Burkina Faso: Volunteers for the Defense of the Homeland	Jama'at Nasr al-Islam wal Muslimin; Ansarul Islam

Commanders and leaders
Ladji Yoro †	Unknown

Casualties and losses
41 killed	Unknown

On December 23, 2021, jihadists from Jama'at Nasr al-Islam wal-Muslimin and Ansarul Islam attacked Burkinabe forces in Titao, Loroum Province, Burkina Faso, killing 41 soldiers. The attack was one of the deadliest attacks against Burkinabe soldiers in the country's history, and occurred just over a month after an attack on Inata killed over fifty soldiers. News of the attack sparked protests across Burkina Faso.

== Background ==
Since 2015, north and northeastern Burkina Faso has been embroiled in an insurgency by the Mali-based Jama'at Nasr al-Islam wal-Muslimin, the Niger-based Islamic State in the Greater Sahara, and the homegrown Burkinabe Ansarul Islam. JNIM and Ansarul Islam are the dominant jihadist groups in Loroum province, located near the Malian border. Prior to the ambush, JNIM militants well-established in the area declared their intent to blockade the provincial capital of Titao. In late November 2021, a large-scale JNIM assault on a Burkinabe base in Inata, the Burkinabe government's last stronghold in Djibo Department, killed over fifty soldiers and saw JNIM capture the town. At the time, the Inata attack was the deadliest attack on Burkinabe soldier's in the country's history. On December 9, 2021, at least twelve militiamen from the pro-government Volunteers for the Defense of the Homeland (VDP) were killed in an ambush by JNIM on the road between Titao and Ouahigouya. Loroum and the neighboring Oudalan Province are considered the most dangerous areas in Burkina Faso, and Burkinabe soldiers are regularly killed in ambushes along the roads in the provinces.

== Ambush ==
On December 23, a convoy of supplies escorted by VDP militiamen led by Ladji Yoro left to aid the city of Titao. At the time of the ambush, Titao had been under the jihadist embargo for months. The ambush took place on the road between Ouahigouya and Titao near the town of You. Due to very few survivors, the details of the ambush are largely unknown. 41 VDP militiamen were killed in the attack along with Yoro, one of the highest-ranking members of the VDP.

News of the attack sparked violent protests in Ouagadougou and other cities across Burkina Faso over the government's inability to quell the jihadist insurgency. Despite a ban on protests, hundreds of people marched against the government in the streets of Ouagadougou. Riot police were dispersed to quell the protests, and demonstrators put up barricades and burning tires. Ten protesters were arrested as well.
