= Yurkud =

- Country: Somalia
- Region: Gedo
- Time zone: UTC+3 (EAT)

Yurkud is a town in the southwestern Gedo region of Somalia. It was the site of the Battle of Yurkud (2012).

It is dominated by a subclan of the Rahaweyn called Malinwiin, also known as Macalinweyn (in the Maxa language). This group was mostly pastoralist before the civil war, and some were Islamic school teachers. Today, this clan has grown large and lives in Bay, Bakool, Gedo, and Middle Juba, specifically in Saakow and Bardera.
