= Tawori attack =

2024 battle in Burkina Faso

- Part of Jihadist insurgency in Burkina Faso
Date	March 31, 2024
Location	Tawori and Boungou gold mine, Tapoa Province, Burkina Faso
Result	JNIM victory: Tawori base captured and looted; JNIM massacre of civilians

Belligerents
Burkina Faso: Volunteers for the Defense of the Homeland; Defense and Security Forces	Jama'at Nasr al-Islam wal Muslimin

Commanders and leaders
Aboubacar Sidiki Barry	Unknown

Strength
Unknown	350 militants 200 motorcycles

Casualties and losses
41+ soldiers and VDP killed 2+ POWs	Unknown
- 32 civilians killed

On March 31, 2024, jihadists from Jama'at Nasr al-Islam wal-Muslimin attacked Burkinabe forces in Tawori, Tapoa Province, Burkina Faso. Over seventy Burkinabe soldiers were killed and thirty-two civilians were killed during the attack and the subsequent massacre.

== Background ==
Violence by jihadist groups increased exponentially since the September 2022 Burkina Faso coup d'état that overthrew putschist Paul-Henri Sandaogo Damiba, who came to power in a coup that January. Much of the violence was caused by the al-Qaeda-aligned Jama'at Nasr al-Islam wal-Muslimin (JNIM) and its affiliates in Burkina Faso and the Islamic State – Sahil Province, which have besieged towns and launched deadly attacks on Burkinabe soldiers and pro-government militiamen.

== Battle ==
At 5:15 pm, JNIM militants attacked the Burkinabe base in Tawori, which was manned by pro-government militiamen from the Volunteers for the Defense of the Homeland (VDP) and Burkinabe soldiers. Around 350 JNIM militants participated in the attack on 200 motorcycles, sparking clashes with the soldiers that lasted for an hour before the jihadists seized the camp. JNIM militants then stayed in the village for two more hours, looting the base and civilian homes and businesses. The militants also raided the Boungou gold mine located a kilometer to the north of Tawori. JNIM militants executed civilians en masse in Tawori and a neighboring village.

Burkinabe officials deployed a Bayraktar TB2 drone from Fada N'gourma to intervene, but the drone arrived too late.

== Aftermath ==
Burkinabe officials reported a death toll of sixteen Burkinabe soldiers and 23 VDP. JNIM released footage of two captured Burkinabe soldiers, although the number of prisoners taken by the jihadists is unknown. At least 32 civilians were killed in the massacre after the battle as well.

The commander at the base in Tawori, Aboubacar Sidiki Barry, was discharged from the Burkinabe Army on April 4 for failing to call on air support in time when his base was being attacked. As a result, all the weapons at the base were looted by JNIM.
