= Battle of Amara (2021) =

- Part of Somali Civil War (2009–present)
Date	August 24, 2021
Location	Amara, Galmudug, Somalia
Result	Somali victory: Al-Shabaab briefly captures town, reversed by airstrike
Territorial changes	Al-Shabaab captures Amara for several hours, recaptured by Somali forces later that day

Belligerents
Somali Army; AFRICOM (airstrike only)	al-Shabaab

Commanders and leaders
Ahmed Abdi Micy †	Unknown

Units involved
Danab; Darawish	Unknown

Casualties and losses
5 soldiers killed 11-24 vehicles destroyed	90 killed (per Somali govt); 62 killed (per US)
- 2 civilians killed

On August 24, 2021, jihadists from Al-Shabaab attacked the town of Amara, Galmudug, Somalia, recapturing the town from Somali forces and killing several soldiers and civilians. The brief capture was reversed by a US airstrike which killed at least sixty jihadists.

== Background ==
In early August, al-Shabaab militants launched several offensives to recapture territory from the Somali government across Galmudug state. One of the towns that Somali forces had recaptured was Amara, on the route to the strategic coastal town of Harardhere. Amara had been under al-Shabaab control for over a decade until its recapture on August 3. On August 10, al-Shabaab fighters killed eight civilians near Beledweyne in their offensives.

== Battle ==
The battle began after al-Shabaab militants targeted Somali special units known as Danab and Darawish in Amara. Eyewitnesses said that the government forces retreated after the attack, and that al-Shabaab took control of the town. Between eleven and twenty-four vehicles were captured, and at least two civilians and four soldiers were killed in the attack. A Somali reporter for Voice of America stated that five soldiers were killed. One of the soldiers killed was Ahmed Abdi Micy, a former Ahlu Sunna Waljama'a fighter.

At 10:52 am, a U.S. airstrike targeted a gathering of al-Shabaab militants in Amara, killing at least 62 fighters. Somali state media estimated that 90 militants were killed in the battle and airstrike together. Following the airstrike, Somali forces recaptured Amara that same day. Galmudug authorities denied that Amara had ever been captured by al-Shabaab on August 28. The Center for Strategic and International Studies assessed that the battle was an example of al-Shabaab's continued ability to wage an insurgency despite successful Somali offensives.
