= 2021 Aguelhok attack =

- Part of Mali War
Date	April 2, 2021
Location	Aguelhok, Mali 19°28′N 0°52′E
Result	Chadian victory

Belligerents
MINUSMA: Chad	Jama'at Nasr al-Islam wal Muslimin

Commanders and leaders
Abdel Razak Hamid Barh †	Iyad Ag Ghaly; Abdallaye Ag al-Baka †

Strength
Unknown	~100–200 men

Casualties and losses
4 dead 16 injured	41 dead 5 POWs
- 2–3 civilians killed

On April 2, 2021, insurgents from the al-Qaeda-linked group Jama'at Nasr al-Islam wal Muslimin (JNIM) attacked a contingent of Chadian troops serving in MINUSMA, the UN's peacekeeping branch throughout the Mali War. The Chadian troops effectively repelled the JNIM attack, inflicting heavy casualties.

== Attack ==
At 6:15 a.m. on April 2, around 100 to 200 jihadists launched a simultaneous attack on two positions at the MINUSMA base in Aguelhok. Some of the jihadists wore Chadian military uniforms to deceive the stationed soldiers, who were mostly Chadian. French newspaper Le Monde stated that this attack was likely led by JNIM commander Iyad Ag Ghaly.

The clashes at the base lasted three hours, with JNIM forces retreating after suffering heavy losses.

== Losses and aftermath ==
Four Chadian soldiers were killed during the fighting, according to a press release from MINUSMA. An anonymous Chadian military source confirmed the number of dead, and added that sixteen more soldiers were injured. Among the dead was Captain Abdel Razak Hamid Barh, who was killed after hitting a VBIED.

The UN initially estimated twenty jihadists were killed, out of a contingent of 100. However, they increased this number after further information in the following days showed over forty fighters were killed. One of the dead fighters was alleged to be Abdallaye Ag al-Baka, former mayor of Tessalit turned right-hand man of Iyad Ag Ghaly.

Malian media, along with the Coordination of Azawad Movements, claimed that Chadian soldiers killed multiple civilians during the fighting, and buried them with the jihadists.
