= Diafarabé and Koumara attacks =

2023 battle of the Mali War

- Part of Mali War
Date	January 10, 2023
Location	Diafarabé, Mopti Region and Koumara, Segou Region, Mali
Result	Inconclusive

Belligerents
Mali; Wagner Group	Jama'at Nasr al-Islam wal Muslimin

Casualties and losses
14 killed, 11 wounded (per Mali); 5 Wagner mercenaries killed, 7 Malian soldiers killed, dozens wounded (per JNIM)	31 killed (per Mali); 5 killed (per JNIM)

On January 10, 2023, jihadists from Jama'at Nasr al-Islam wal Muslimin (JNIM) attacked Malian soldiers and Wagner Group mercenaries in the villages of Diafarabé and Koumara in central Mali.

== Background ==
In early 2023, the al-Qaeda-aligned jihadist military coalition JNIM ramped up its campaign against Malian forces and their allied Wagner Group mercenaries in central Mali. The first attacks were in Koulikoro Region on January 2, with JNIM fighters killing two people in the village of Kassela and five in the village of Markacoungo.

== Attacks ==
The attacks took place in Ténenkou Cercle in Mopti Region and Macina Cercle in Ségou Region. Both were launched in tandem on January 10, with the first occurring between the villages of Dia and Diafarabe. The second attack was in between Koumara and Macina. In both attacks, JNIM fighters detonated homemade bombs and then ambushed the Malian and allied soldiers.

An initial report by the Malian army stated that twelve Malian soldiers were killed in the attacks. On January 11, Malian officials stated that fourteen soldiers were killed and eleven were wounded, and that thirty-one jihadists were "neutralized." The attack was claimed by JNIM on January 10, the same day of the attacks. In JNIM's statement, they claimed there was an unknown number of casualties from the attack in Diafarabe and that five Wagner mercenaries and seven Malian soldiers were killed in Koumara, along with dozens of others injured. JNIM claimed that only five jihadists were killed.

The attacks were considered the deadliest day for the Malian army in several months.
