= Battle of Yurkud (2012) =

Part of the War in Somalia (2009–present)

- Part of the War in Somalia (2009–present)
Date	10 March 2012
Location	Yurkud, Somalia
Result	Ethiopian Victory

Belligerents
Ethiopia	Al-Shabab

Commanders and leaders
Diyad Abdi Kalil	Abdiaziz Abu-Musab

Strength
Ethiopia: Unknown	Al-Shabab: Unknown

Casualties and losses
: 6 killed 73 killed (Al-Shabaab claim)	: 17+ killed 5 killed (Al-Shabaab claim)

The Battle of Yurkud was a three-hour-long military engagement on 10 March 2012 fought between Ethiopian military forces and al-Shabab militants approximately 40 km from the Ethiopian border. According to Ethiopian sources, al-Shabab initiated the engagement with an attack on a military base in Yurkud at around 6 a.m. Fighting continued for three hours before, as locals report, al-Shabab was forced to retreat. The number of dead on either side is not known, with reports varying widely. Al-Shabab claimed to have lost five and killed 73, while one local resident said he saw at least 17 al-Shabab dead and another claimed he had seen six dead Ethiopian soldiers.
