= Battle of Adrar Bouss =

- Part of Jihadist insurgency in Niger
| Date | 15 September 2011 |
| Location | Aïr Massif, Niger |
| Result | Nigerien victory |

Belligerents
| Niger | (Islamic State) Al-Qaeda in the Islamic Maghreb |

Strength
| Unknown | Unknown |

Casualties and losses
| 1 | 3 |

The Battle of Adrar Bouss was fought on 15 September 2011 between the armed forces of Niger and Al-Qaeda in the Islamic Maghreb.

== Battle ==
On September 15, 2011, near Adrar Bouss, 400 kilometers northeast of Agadez, in the northern part of the Aïr Massif, a skirmish occurred between a detachment of the Nigerien army and AQIM fighters.

== Aftermath ==
According to a statement from the Nigerien Ministry of Defense, the outcome was one killed and two injured among the military, with three deaths reported on the jihadist side. Additionally, the soldiers seized an RPG-7 rocket launcher, three AK-47 rifles, a machine gun, and a significant quantity of ammunition. Two or three jihadist pick-up trucks were captured, and another was destroyed during the confrontation. The Nigerien army also claimed to have captured 59 young recruits of AQIM, who stated that they were recruited in Agadez by a Marabout from Tahoua and his assistant. Both individuals were subsequently arrested.
