= Archam clashes =

Conflict in Archam, Mali

- Part of Mali War
Date	February 18–19, 2022
Location	Archam, Tessit, Gao Region, Mali
Result	Malian victory: Malian forces capture Archam

Belligerents
Mali: Malian Air Force	Unknown jihadists: Jama'at Nasr al-Islam wal Muslimin; Islamic State in the Greater Sahara

Casualties and losses
8 killed 14 injured 5 missing	57 killed

Between February 18 and 19, 2022, clashes broke out in Archam, Mali, near the border with Burkina Faso and Niger, between the Malian Army and unknown jihadists.

== Prelude ==
The border region between Mali, Burkina Faso, and Niger has been a hotbed of violence between the aforementioned governments and jihadist groups, most notably Jama'at Nasr al-Islam wal Muslimin, which is aligned with Al-Qaeda, and the Islamic State in the Greater Sahara. While JNIM and ISGS only gained prominence in the region in the late 2010s, the Malian government, backed by French Operation Barkhane, had been fighting Islamist groups in the region since the outbreak of the Mali War in 2012. In 2020, French-backed president Ibrahim Boubacar Keïta was deposed in a coup. A year later, the 2020 junta leader, Bah Ndaw, was deposed by a coup led by Assimi Goïta. One of Goita's actions in his rule was expelling Operation Barkhane, and bringing in the Russian paramilitary Wagner Group. French forces exited Mali on February 17, 2022, with one of their last actions in the region being an operation with the Takuba Task Force in Ménaka and Gao regions of Mali against JNIM and ISGS. Wagner Group was brought into the same areas as the Takuba Task Force was.

Prior to the clashes, around 40 civilians were killed by jihadists in clashes between JNIM and ISGS near Tessit, not far from Archam. The Islamic State managed to capture the area, and around 60 fighters from both sides were killed.

== Clashes ==
The fighting began with an air raid near the area on February 18 by the Malian Air Force. The air force launched strikes on a column of motorcycles with armed men, who were surrounding a Malian patrol group in the area. Malian ground troops then began storming bases of the jihadists, destroying one of them. In a press release, the Malian government stated eight soldiers were killed, 14 injured, and five missing in the clashes. Malian officials also stated that fifty-seven militants were killed in the airstrikes and operation.

== Aftermath ==
Following the clashes in Archam, locals stated that the town, along with Tessit, were calm under Malian control, although food insecurity was prevalent. There were no noted clashes or violent events in the Archam area the following week.

On February 23, eighteen civilians were killed and eight injured in Niger following an attack on a truck traveling through the tripoint area.
