= Torodi ambush =

- Part of Jihadist insurgency in Niger
Date	July 31, 2021
Location	near Torodi, Tillaberi Region, Niger
Result	JNIM victory

Belligerents
Niger	Jama'at Nasr al-Islam wal-Muslimin

Casualties and losses
18 killed 7 injured	Unknown
- 1 civilian killed

On July 31, 2021, jihadists from Jama'at Nasr al-Islam wal-Muslimin ambushed Nigerien forces near Torodi, Tillabéri Region, Niger, killing 18 Nigerien soldiers.

== Background ==
Jama'at Nasr al-Islam wal-Muslimin (JNIM) is the affiliate of al-Qaeda in the Sahel, being founded in 2017 as a coalition of various al-Qaeda aligned jihadist groups in the Mali War. The group expanded that same year into northern Burkina Faso and western Niger through negotiations with locals and JNIM commander Iyad Ag Ghaly, along with the growing presence of Amadou Koufa and his Fulani-dominated jihadist group Katiba Macina. While attacks in Niger had been often perpetrated by the Islamic State in the Greater Sahara, JNIM entered the country in 2017 and claimed their first attack on Nigerien forces in Midal.

== Ambush ==
At 11 a.m. on July 31, Nigerien soldiers in Torodi, Say Department, Tillabéri Region were ambushed while they were carrying out a supply mission to Boni, along the tri-border area between Niger, Burkina Faso, and Mali. The supply operation was part of the Nigerien Operation Saki II. The soldiers attempted to evacuate the wounded from the ambush, but hit an IED. Nigerien forces began patrolling the area on August 1, launching combing operations to find the jihadists.

The Nigerien Ministry of Defense initially stated 15 soldiers were killed, seven injured, and six missing, although this toll was revised to 18 soldiers and one civilian killed and seven injured. JNIM claimed responsibility for the attack on August 1.
