= Niafunké attack =

2023 battle of the Mali War

- Part of Mali War
| Date | November 24, 2023 |
| Location | Niafunké, Mali |
| Result | JNIM victory |

Belligerents
| Mali | Jama'at Nasr al-Islam wal Muslimin |

Casualties and losses
| 50 killed (per JNIM); 5 vehicles captured (per JNIM) | Unknown |

On November 24, 2023, jihadist militants from Jama'at Nasr al-Islam wal Muslimin (JNIM) attacked Malian forces at Niafunké, Mali.

== Background ==
In November 2023, the al-Qaeda-aligned militant coalition JNIM intensified its attacks against Malian and Wagner Group forces in Mali. In September, JNIM simultaneously attacked a civilian boat on the Niger River and a Malian military base in Bamba, launching the deadliest terror attack in the country's history that killed over 154 people. JNIM attacked a Malian and Wagner convoy near Anéfis in November, with no casualties reported.

== Attack ==
On November 24, a suicide bomber named Dawud al-Ansari, blew up a vehicle at the entrance of the Malian base at Niafunke. The attack was simultaneously launched in Niafunke and Goundam, with the Malian government reporting that they had come under shell fire in both towns. In a statement, the Malian government claimed that the JNIM attack had been repulsed. Images released by JNIM media outlet Az-Zallaqa showed jihadists in control of the camp at Niafunke and riding motorbikes through the bodies of slain Malian soldiers. These images were later verified by SITE Intelligence Group. The JNIM statement claimed that fifty Malian soldiers were killed, and five vehicles were captured. The Malian government did not mention any casualties in a statement.
