= Battle of Bal'ad (2022) =

2022 military action in Somalia

- Part of Somali Civil War (2009–present)
Date	October 7, 2022
Location	Muryale, Bal'ad, Somalia
Result	Somali victory

Belligerents
Somalia	al-Qaeda: al-Shabaab

Casualties and losses
12 killed (per al-Shabaab)	19 killed (per Somalia)

On October 7, 2022, Somali Army troops repulsed an Al-Shabaab attack on a military base near Balad, Somalia. In the skirmish, nineteen al-Shabaab members were reportedly killed.

== Prelude ==
Since a functioning government formed in 2009, Somalia has been grappling with a wave of jihadist unrest fueled by terror group Al-Shabaab. In the past, al-Shabaab controlled vast swaths of the Somali desert and launched dozens of bombings and attacks on cities like Kismayo and Mogadishu. In 2022, a massive crackdown on financial and military assets of al-Shabaab by Somali president Hassan Sheikh Mohamud crippled the militant group, and several offensives in Hirshabelle State and Galmudug liberated several towns and hundreds of villages from the group. The town of Bal'ad, in Hirshabelle state, has faced the brunt of several battles, numerous attacks, and dozens of assassinations being on the frontline of the Somali Civil War. In September 2022, the police chief of Mogadishu was killed along with several other officers after he stepped out of his vehicle onto a landmine in Bal'ad.

== Battle ==
On the morning of October 7, an unknown number of al-Shabaab militants stormed a Somali Army base in Bal'ad. Abdikamil Maalim Shukri, a spokesman in the Somali Ministry of Internal Security, claimed that the soldiers at the base in the suburb of Muryale near Bal'ad knew about the attack before it happened, and were able to be on patrol and defend the base effectively. In the attack, al-Shabaab launched explosives at the start of the attack. Afterwards, the Somali Army claimed to have killed nineteen al-Shabaab militants. Al-Shabaab, however, claimed twelve SNA soldiers were killed. Civilian reports showed losses on both sides were heavy.
