= Nokara ambush =

2021 terrorist attack

- Part of Mali War
Date	19 August, 2021
Location	Between Nokara and Boni, Mali
Result	JNIM victory

Belligerents
Mali	Jama'at Nasr al-Islam wal Muslimin

Casualties and losses
17 dead 42 injured 1 missing	Unknown

On August 19, 2021, al-Qaeda-linked militants from Jama'at Nasr al-Islam wal Muslimin (JNIM) ambushed Malian troops, with a shootout ensuing.

== Ambush ==
A Malian military convoy left the town of Hombori heading toward Douentza on August 19, 2021. In between the towns of Nokara and Boni, the convoy hit an IED, prompting nearby jihadists from JNIM to shoot. The attackers seized four vehicles, some equipped with 12.7 mm guns.

Katibat Macina, a regional variant of the JNIM, is suspected to be behind the attacks.

== Losses ==
The Malian government stated that seventeen soldiers were killed, one missing, and forty-two were wounded during the attack. On August 21, senior Malian military officials landed in Boni to assess the situation, but were held back by the soldiers stationed there, accusing them of not knowing the reality on the ground.
