= 2010 Tilwa attack =

2010 military action in Niger

- Part of Jihadist insurgency in Niger
Date	March 8, 2010
Location	Tilwa, Tillaberi Region, Niger
Result	Indecisive

Belligerents
Niger	AQIM

Strength
Unknown	~100 fighters 12 pickups

Casualties and losses
5 killed 20 injured	3 killed

On March 8, 2010, jihadists from Al-Qaeda in the Islamic Maghreb (AQIM) attacked Nigerien forces at their base in Tilwa, Tillabéri Region, Niger.

== Background ==
Al-Qaeda in the Islamic Maghreb (AQIM) expanded southwards from Algeria into the Sahel in the early 2000s, killing and kidnapping tourists for ransom in Mali, Mauritania, and Niger. At the start of 2010, suspected AQIM jihadists attacked Nigerien forces near Tlemsess, a remote village in Tahoua Region, killing seven Nigerien soldiers and their guide.

== Attack ==
At 6am on March 8, an AQIM suicide bomber drove a truck carrying 600 kilograms of explosives towards the front of the Nigerien barracks at Tilwa. Fighting erupted immediately after as around 100 jihadists in 12 pickups ransacked the base, with the clashes lasting until 8am. The AQIM militants fled towards Mali driving a looted Nigerien vehicle. A few hours after the attack, an anonymous security source told AFP that five soldiers were killed and twenty were injured, making it the deadliest attack against the Nigerien army so far. On March 9, government spokesman Laouli Dandah confirmed that five soldiers were killed in a radio broadcast and stated that three jihadists were killed as well. Dandah stated that there was no local involvement in the attacks.

AQIM confirmed involvement in the attack, and claimed "no less than 25 soldiers" were killed and three vehicles were destroyed.
