= Jaysh al-Sunna =

Homs-based Islamist rebel group

- جيش السنة
- The logo of Jaysh al-Sunna
- Leader: Ammar Bouqai
- Dates active: 20 March 2015 – 28 January 2017
- Active regions: Homs Governorate; Idlib Governorate; Aleppo Governorate
- Ideology: Sunni Islamism
- Size: 500+ fighters
- Part of: Free Syrian Army; Army of Conquest; Fatah Halab
- Wars: Syrian Civil War; US intervention in the Syrian civil war; 2015 Idlib offensive; Second Battle of Idlib; 2015 Jisr al-Shughur offensive; Rojava–Islamist conflict; 2016 Aleppo campaign; Aleppo offensive (July–August 2016); Aleppo offensive (November–December 2016); Idlib Governorate clashes (January 2017)

Jaysh al-Sunna (Arabic: جيش السنة, lit. 'Army of the Sunnah') was a Homs-based Islamist rebel group that was established as a merger between different rebel groups, some of which originally came from the Free Syrian Army's Farouq Brigades, and was active during the Syrian Civil War. It joined the Army of Conquest on 24 March 2015, and took part in the Second Battle of Idlib. It lost 14 fighters in the battle. The group became part of Hay'at Tahrir al-Sham in 2018.

== Alleged bombing by the U.S.-led coalition ==
On 11 August 2015, an ammunition depot and base belonging to the group were allegedly bombed by the U.S.-led anti-ISIL coalition in the Atme area in the northern Idlib Governorate. Ten of the group's fighters were killed along with 8 civilians. Robert Ford, the former U.S. ambassador to Syria, expressed consternation at why an airstrike was conducted on Jaysh al-Sunna.

== Reported use of child soldiers ==
In October 2016, it was reported that Jaysh al-Sunna released a video which featured child soldiers at an unidentified training camp. A Saudi cleric named Abdullah al-Muhesini was linked to the child soldier recruitment in northern Aleppo, and has allegedly recruited up to 1,000 children in all of Syria by paying them a $100 monthly salary.

== Notable former member groups ==
- Battalion 13

== See also ==
- List of armed groups in the Syrian Civil War
