= Second Battle of Habbaniyah =

U.S. military operation in Iraq (2006–2007)

- Part of the Iraqi insurgency (2003–11)
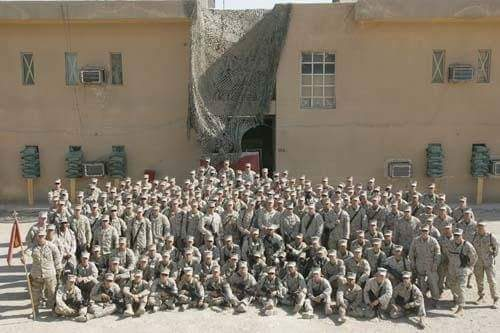
- Kilo 3/2 prior to initial combat operations in August 2006.
Date	August 17, 2006 – February 14, 2007 (5 months and 4 weeks)
Location	Habbaniyah, Iraq
Result	U.S. victory

Belligerents
United States	Al-Qaeda in Iraq

Commanders and leaders
Lt. Col. Todd Desgrosseilliers	Abu Ayyub al-Masri; Abu Omar al-Baghdadi

Units involved
United States Marine Corps: 3rd Battalion, 2nd Marine Regiment, 2nd Marine Division	No specific units

Strength
852	Unknown

Casualties and losses
14 killed, 123 wounded	37 killed, 300+ wounded, 300+ captured

The Second Battle of Habbaniyah was a U.S. military operation involving in Iraq the United States Marine Corps' 3rd Battalion, 2nd Marine Regiment, 2nd Marine Division, operating under the command of Regimental Combat Team 5. The battle took place between August 17, 2006 and February 14, 2007.

== Background ==
Eastern Anbar Province, particularly the cities of Fallujah and Ramadi, had been a hotbed of anti-western sentiment and insurgent activity since the conquest of the country by the Coalition in March and April 2003. Operation Iraqi Freedom had liberated the country from the despotism of the Hussein administration, but for the Sunni Muslims of Al Anbar Province, Saddam's fall left them without the power they had accumulated through the Ba'ath Party. Soon after the fall of Baghdad, unrest in the west led Al Qaeda Iraq to designate the 30-kilometer corridor between the provincial cities as a potential stronghold. Despite multiple major operations in the region by US forces, notably Operation Phantom Fury in 2004, Ramadi and Fallujah remained among the hottest war zones in the world from 2004 through 2007.

The Marine Corps' 2nd Division deployed their 3rd Battalion, 2nd Regiment to Iraq in July 2006. Lt. Col. Todd Desgrosseilliers, commanding the unit of around 850 Marines, was a veteran of fighting in Fallujah, where he was awarded a Silver Star. 3/2, known as the Betio Bastards, comprised three infantry "line" companies, one heavy weapons company (including a scout sniper section) and a HQ company (including Communications and Motor Transport sections). AQI in early 2006 was led by Abu Ayyub al-Masri; their strength was unknown but estimated as between 1000–3000.

== The Battle ==
U.S. Marines of the 3rd Battalion, 2nd Marine Division, swept through urban sprawl between Ramadi and Fallujah in a series of operations (i.e. Operations RUBICON and SIDEWINDER), disrupting flow of Al-Qaeda and Sunni insurgents into both cities, and killing and capturing over 300 insurgents. Action centered around Kilo Company, nicknamed "Voodoo", in the towns of Husaybah, Bidimnah, and Julaybah on the outskirts of Ramadi. Kilo Marines killed or captured 137 insurgents; 4 Marines were killed in action, and 17 were wounded. Within Kilo itself, the squad most affected was "Voodoo Mobile", the vehicle-mounted element of the unit's HQ section. Of its 16 members, 12 were wounded and 3 were killed between September and November 2006.

During the seven-month deployment, fighting between Al-Qaeda and the Marines was largely sporadic but intense. While only a handful of large-scale firefights developed - mostly in the suburbs of Ramadi between Habbaniyah and Julaybah - contact between the two sides was nearly continuous. Kilo Company officers reported sniper fire on a daily basis, as well as IED strikes on over 200 of the over 250 vehicle patrols they mounted.

Operations consisted of a mixed array of company-scale urban "sweep-and-clear" operations, census and suppression patrols, and static, fortified area-denial positions. The battalion was spread out along a 30 kilometer front from the western fringes of Fallujah to the eastern boundary of Ramadi.

During the battle, 14 Marines from the 3rd Battalion, 2nd Marines were killed and at least 123 were wounded. 12 of the 14 were killed by IED strikes, while the other two suffered mortal wounds from sniper fire.

== Aftermath ==
After action reports from 3/2's command structure indicate that while they were highly successful in individual engagements, and that the pre-deployment desert warfare training was invaluable (see Mojave Viper), long-term success was beyond their grasp. Tactically, the Marines had dominated the battlespace and done massive damage to AQI's ability to push fighters into the strategically critical cities of Ramadi and Fallujah; however, they were unable to sway the support of the local populace to the side of the Coalition. In addition, the lull in attacks during the changeover between 3/2 and their replacements in February led to a relaxing of vigilance among the Pendleton unit, causing further significant casualties among the Marines in Habbaniyah later that year.
