= Lamana Ould Bou =

Malian Lieutenant colonel (1972-2009)

- Born: 1972; Timbuktu, Mali
- Died: 10 June 2009 (aged 36–37) Tombouctou Region, Mali
- Allegiance: Libya (until 1980); Arab Islamic Front of Azawad (1990‑1991); Mali (1991‑2009)
- Rank: Lieutenant Colonel
- Conflicts: Lebanese Civil War; Tuareg rebellion (1990-1995); Jihadist insurgency in Mali and Mauritania (2005-2012) †

Lamana Ould Mohamed Yahie Ould Bou, also known as Lamana Ould Bou, was a Malian lieutenant-colonel who was assassinated by al-Qaeda in the Islamic Maghreb (AQIM) in 2009 for his role in releasing European hostages and arresting prominent AQIM leaders.

== Biography ==
Bou is an Berabich Arab born in Timbuktu, Mali, in 1972. He joined the Libyan Islamic Legion at a young age and fought in the Lebanese Civil War. On his return to Mali, he joined the Arab Islamic Front of Azawad (FIAA) during the Tuareg rebellion of the 1990s. After the ratification of the Tamanrasset Accords in 1991, he joined the Malian Army and became a state security officer.

Bou rose through the Malian ranks due to his knowledge of Tombouctou Region, and fought against Ibrahim Ag Bahanga. His diplomatic skills allowed him to release hostages kidnapped by al-Qaeda in the Islamic Maghreb. After Bou arrested a Mauritanian Islamist in a mosque in Timbuktu, he became AQIM's target. Bou has also been claimed to be part of AQIM's financial network, with his assassination being AQIM "settling scores."

Bou was assassinated in his home in Timbuktu on the night between June 10 and 11, 2009. The attackers are presumed to be part of AQIM. One of them, a Tunisian national, was detained later on by Malian forces. He was buried in his hometown on June 12 with several thousand people attending his funeral.

Bou's death occurred a week after AQIM killed hostage Edwin Dyer, a British national. In response, Malian authorities coordinated an anti-jihadist operation alongside Algeria, Mauritania, and Nigeria. Bou's death is considered Mali's casus belli for war against AQIM; he is considered the first Malian soldier to be killed by Islamists. In June 2009, Malian forces attacked a jihadist base in Garn-Akassa, killing 26 jihadists.
