= Sétif offensive =

Date	September 2003
Location	Sétif Province, Algeria
Result	Algerian government victory

Belligerents
Algeria	GSPC

Casualties and losses
Unknown	165+ rebels killed

The Sétif offensive was a two-week Algerian army offensive against the Salafist Group for Preaching and Combat (GSPC) near the Babor Mountains in Sétif province in September 2003. The armed forces at this time began a campaign to eliminate the remains of the Armed Islamic Group and the GSPC, which reportedly had 400 fighters. In one of its most successful attacks in the Algerian Civil War, the Algerian People's National Army successfully killed 150 rebel militants of the GSPC. Algerian newspapers reported that 105 rebel corpses were found in caves near the Babor Mountains after an intense artillery bombardment. A week earlier, the government offensive killed 15 members of the GSPC, and only a few pockets of rebels were left in Algeria.
