= Noaka attack =

2023 battle in Burkina Faso

- Part of Jihadist insurgency in Burkina Faso
Date	June 26, 2023
Location	Noaka, Sanmatenga Province, Burkina Faso
Result	Indecisive

Belligerents
Volunteers for the Defense of the Homeland	Jama'at Nasr al-Islam wal Muslimin

Casualties and losses
33 killed Several injured Several missing	50 killed (per Burkina Faso)

On June 26, 2023, jihadists from Jama'at Nasr al-Islam wal-Muslimin attacked pro-government Volunteers for the Defense of the Homeland (VDP) militiamen in Noaka, Sanmatenga Province, Burkina Faso. Over 33 VDP were killed in the attack, and Burkinabe officials claimed that over 50 jihadists were killed.

== Background ==
Violence by jihadist groups increased exponentially since the September 2022 Burkina Faso coup d'état that overthrew putschist Paul-Henri Sandaogo Damiba, who came to power in a coup that January. Much of the violence was caused by the al-Qaeda-aligned Jama'at Nasr al-Islam wal-Muslimin and its affiliates in Burkina Faso and the Islamic State – Sahil Province, which have besieged towns and launched deadly attacks on Burkinabe soldiers and pro-government militiamen.

Jihadists from JNIM attacked Burkinabe VDP in Namssiguia on the same day as the Noaka attack, killing over 34 soldiers and 40 jihadists.

== Attack ==
Only VDP militiamen were present at the base in Noaka at the time of the attack. Little information about the details of the attack are available due to heavy press restrictions in Burkina Faso, but Burkinabe officials said that the VDP fought "valiantly" during the attack. An official in the VDP stated that dozens of men were killed and many more were injured, and several others were missing. A resident of Noaka stated that around thirty VDP were killed in the attack, and dubbed it "a massacre." The VDP defenses killed a large number of the jihadists, and several motorcycles and weapons were retrieved.

Burkinabe officials stated on June 30 that 33 VDP were killed in the attack and around 50 jihadists were killed.
