= 2015 Idlib offensive =

Military operation

- Part of the Syrian Civil War
- Situation in Idlib as of 5 April 2015. Syrian Army control Syrian Opposition control
Date	24 March – 5 April 2015 (1 week and 5 days)
Location	Idlib Governorate, Syria
Result	Army of Conquest victory: Rebels capture Idlib city and besiege Kafarya and Al-Fu'ah; Rebel attack on Mastouma repelled

Belligerents
Army of Conquest; Al-Nusra Front; Ahrar al-Sham; Sham Legion; Jaysh al-Sunna; Liwa al-Haqq; Ajnad al-Sham; Jund al-Aqsa; Ajnad al-Kavkaz; Tarkhan's Jamaat	(Ba'athist Syria) Syrian Government; Syrian Armed Forces; Syrian Arab Army; National Defense Forces; Iran; Hezbollah; Russia

Commanders and leaders
Abu Kamal (Ahrar ash-Sham Central Area Commander); Abu Jamil Yusuf al-Qutb † (Ahrar ash-Sham deputy leader); Hassan al-Khalifa † (Omar al-Farouq Brigade commander); Abu Abdullah Taoum † (Ajnad ash-Sham leader); Nathir Terman † (al-Nusra field commander); Abdul Jashari (Main commander of Xhemati Alban)	(Syria) Brig. Gen. Emad Ibrahim (Syria) Col. Suhayl al-Hassan (Syria) Mohamed Khair al-Sayyed (Governor of Idlib); Al Hajj Walaa † (Hezbollah commander)

Units involved
Ahrar al-Sham; Omar al-Farouq Brigade	(Syria) 11th Armored Division (Syria) 155th Brigade (Syria) Tiger Forces

Strength
5,000–7,000 fighters: al-Nusra Front: 3,000 fighters	Unknown

The 2015 Idlib offensive refers to a series of rebel operations in the Idlib Governorate, during the Syrian Civil War. The offensive started with a rebel assault on the capital of the province, Idlib. According to The Economist, the capture of Idlib came about largely because Gulf Arab states "gave more backing to their proxies despite American objections."

== The offensive ==
=== Battle for Idlib ===
On 24 March 2015, the newly established Fattah Army operation room ("The Army of Conquest") assaulted Idlib city from three sides. On 27 March, the rebels managed to penetrate the city. At this point, the city was almost completely encircled by rebel groups, leaving only two exit routes for government forces. The next day, after four days of fighting, rebels captured the city and managed to besiege the towns of Kafarya and al-Fu'a. Syrian government troops regrouped south of the city, and were preparing for a possible attack by rebel forces.

The battle for Idlib left at least 132 rebels, 76 soldiers and 11 civilians dead. In addition, 15 prisoners held by the state security services were executed as the Army retreated.

=== Assault on Mastouma ===
Between 28 and 30 March 47 people, including 15 rebels, were killed during a government bombardment of Idlib city, which reportedly included chemical weapons.

On 2 April, the rebels advanced in the area of Mastouma and its military base, where most of the retreated government forces were positioned. The next day, rebels intensified their attacks on three axes and further advanced in the Mastouma area, seizing parts of Mastouma during the night. According to rebel sources, Brigadier General Emad Ibrahim was killed in the battle.

On 4 April, the Tiger Forces arrived at Ariha to support the entrenched government troops in and around Mastouma.

By 5 April, after a two-day battle, that was described as a “full-scale assault” on Mastouma, the rebel attack on the military camp and village had been repelled. The initial rebel advance into Mastouma was revealed to be a trap set up by the military, which helped them surround the opposition fighters and engage in street fighting, after which the rebels were pushed back and retreated. The army repositioned on a strategic hill that represents the first defense line for the camp. According to different sources, between 50 and 450 rebels were killed. The pro-opposition Syrian Observatory for Human Rights reported six deaths among government troops.

== Aftermath ==
=== Government counterattack ===
On 8 April, the military, led by the special forces unit the Tiger Forces, launched a counter-attack towards the villages of Qameenas and Faylan. By 10 April, they had secured the approaches to Mastouma but halted their advance in the outskirts of the two villages after encountering stiff resistance from the rebels.

Four days later, the Tiger Forces and other army units had reportedly breached the rebel defenses and entered Qameenas. According to a military source, Air Force Intelligence intercepted the communications of local Al-Nusra Front commanders who were reportedly in panic over the collapse of their defensive line. Around the same time the Air Force had carried out 51 airstrikes throughout the province.

On 15 April, Army troops went on the offensive near Ariha and captured the villages of Kafr Najd and Nahlaya. The military also reached Kurin, with clashes taking place as the troops tried to take over the village.

By 18 April 349 air-strikes were conducted against Idlib city and its countryside since the rebel takeover of the provincial capital on 28 March. The air campaign left hundreds of rebel fighters dead. The same day, the military captured the village of Muqablah, linking up with NDF fighters in the southeastern part of Faylan, and by 20 April advanced to Tell Zahir Al-Mufraq hill. The rebels also withdrew from Kurin due to a lack of support from their main headquarters and the Tiger Forces were soon in the town, but had not yet reached Tell Kurin hill to the west. Five days later, a military source reported the town to be under the control of the Tiger Forces.

=== Rebel Northwestern Syria offensive ===
On 23 April, rebels launched an offensive against the de facto provincial capital of Idlib governorate, Jisr al-Shughur, threatening to cut off government access to a major highway linking Idlib to Latakia. Other objectives in this offensive were the Brick Factory base (near Mastouma) and the Al-Ghaab Plain in Hama governorate.
