= Operation Laabingol =

2022 battle in Burkina Faso

- Part of Jihadist insurgency in Burkina Faso
Date	January 16–23, 2022
Location	Near Gorom-Gorom and Djibo, Burkina Faso
Result	Franco-Burkinabe victory

Belligerents
Burkina Faso; France	Jama'at Nasr al-Islam wal Muslimin; Ansarul Islam

Strength
Several hundred men	Unknown

Casualties and losses
1 killed, 2 injured None	~60 killed or injured

Between January 16 and 23, 2022, French and Burkinabe forces conducted a counter-jihadist operation in and around the cities of Gorom-Gorom and Djibo, both in northern Burkina Faso. The operation was the last major one conducted between French forces and Burkinabe ones before the January 2022 Burkina Faso coup d'état, and several dozen jihadists from Jama'at Nasr al-Islam wal-Muslimin and Ansarul Islam were killed or injured.

== Background ==
Since 2015, northern and eastern Burkina Faso have experienced an insurgency involving groups such as Jama'at Nasr al-Islam wal-Muslimin (JNIM), Islamic State in the Greater Sahara (ISGS), and Ansarul Islam.

In November and December 2021, attacks in Inata and Titao resulted in significant casualties among Burkinabè security forces.

Public protests took place in Ouagadougou amid criticism of President Roch Marc Christian Kaboré’s handling of the security crisis.

== Operation ==
Little is known about the details of the operation, although French and Burkinabe officials stated that it took place between January 16 and 23, 2022. On four occasions within the operation, several groups of jihadists were "located, identified, and neutralized" according to the French Ministry of Defence. Several hundred Burkinabe soldiers took part in the operation.

On the first day, January 16, a Eurocopter Tiger helicopter ambushed a patrol of jihadists near Gorom-Gorom. Between January 17 and 18, a column of jihadist vehicles was bombed by French planes guided by Burkinabe units. On January 23, another group of jihadists was bombed near Djibo by drones and French Mirage 2000s, destroying about ten motorcycles.

French officials stated on January 30 that nearly sixty jihadists had been "put out of action" and around twenty motorcycles and armed pick-ups were destroyed. The Burkinabe army stated in a press release on January 31 that 163 jihadists had been "neutralized", including 60 during joint Franco-Burkinabe operations. The Burkinabe statement added that one Burkinabe soldier was killed and two were wounded. They also claimed a jihadist leader named Mdouli, also known as Abdramane, was killed during the operation.
