= Bodio ambush =

2021 battle of the Mali War

- Part of Mali War
Date	6 October 2021
Location	Bodio, Mopti region, Mali
Result	JNIM victory

Belligerents
Mali	Jama'at Nasr al-Islam wal Muslimin

Casualties and losses
16 killed, 10 wounded (per local officials and AFP); 9 killed (per Mali)	15 killed, 20 motorcycles captured (per Mali)

On October 6, 2021, al-Qaeda-allied jihadists from Jama'at Nasr al-Islam wal Muslimin (JNIM) ambushed a Malian convoy in Mopti Region, killing scores of Malian soldiers. The ensuing firefight left dozens of jihadists dead.

== Ambush ==
In the late morning of October 6, Malian vehicles passing through Bodio, a small village between Koro and Bandiagara, were ambushed by IEDs. Jihadists waiting nearby then engaged in a firefight with the stunned Malian soldiers. In the following days, the Malian army claimed to have responded "vigorously" with airstrikes and further operations in the area.

Later, the attack was claimed by Jama'at Nasr al-Islam wal Muslimin.

== Losses and aftermath ==
On the evening of the ambush, the Malian government announced a death toll of nine soldiers. However, local officials stated that sixteen soldiers were killed and ten were injured. Malian operations after the attack killed fifteen jihadists and captured twenty motorcycles, according to Malian government officials.
