= Sorgha =

- Country: Burkina Faso
- Region: Est Region
- Province: Gnagna Province
- Department: Bogandé Department

Population (2019)
  - Total: 3,371

Sorgha is a town in the Bogandé Department of Gnagna Province in eastern Burkina Faso.

Population
| Year | Pop. | ±% |
|---|---|---|
| 1985 | 1,314 | — |
| 2006 | 1,859 | +41.5% |
| 2019 | 3,371 | +81.3% |
