= Battle of Talataye (2022) =

Battle in the Mali War

- Part of the Mali War
Date	6–7 September 2022
Location	Talataye, Mali
Result	ISGS victory

Belligerents
Movement for the Salvation of Azawad	Islamic State: Sahel Province	Jama'at Nasr al-Islam wal Muslimin

Commanders and leaders
Unknown	"Hicham"	Amadou Koufa

Strength
Unknown	Several hundred	Unknown

Casualties and losses
60+ (per IS) 17+ (per ACLED); 4 (per MSA)	Unknown	Unknown
- 30–45+ civilians killed (per local officials)

The Battle of Talataye took place between 6 and 7 September 2022 during the Menaka offensives of the Mali War. During the battle, militants from the Islamic State in the Greater Sahara stormed Talataye, Mali, looting and burning the town. The following day, ISGS abandoned Talataye.

== Background ==
In March 2022, Islamic State in the Greater Sahara (ISGS) militants launched an offensive in the Ménaka Region in eastern Mali, which was then predominantly defended by government-aligned Tuareg rebels under the Movement for the Salvation of Azawad (MSA). The jihadists quickly took control of Andéramboukane and other villages in the region. These captures were accompanied by massacres, with 300 to 700 Tuareg civilians being killed between March and August 2022. The uptick in violence caused 50,000 civilians to flee to the regional capital of Ménaka.

Talataye had 13,000 inhabitants in 2009, although many had fled due to violence from the war in the years after. Throughout March 2022, jihadists from Jama'at Nasr al-Islam wal Muslimin (JNIM) affiliated with al-Qaeda took up positions south and west of Talataye in preparation for fighting inside the town. At least 100 civilians were killed in Talataye in an ISGS attack on the town between March 21 and 23. Before the battle, JNIM and the MSA signed an agreement of mutual defense against ISGS if they attacked the town.

== Battle ==
The Islamic State attacked Talataye in the afternoon of September 6, at 3:00 pm local time. The western half of the city was occupied by JNIM, with the rest being occupied by MSA in smaller numbers. ISGS, under the leadership of a man called "Hicham", launched an assault with several hundred men on motorcycles against both sides of the city. The offensive was conducted on several axes, with the first assaults coming from the south and east, and later attacking the north.

After three to four hours of fighting, Talataye fell under Islamic State control. Shops belonging to members of the Douassak ethnic group were looted, homes were set ablaze, and the town marketplace was burned down. Civilians who were unable to flee were massacred by ISGS, under the pretense of suspected collaboration.

The Malian government stated in a press release that it had conducted "offensive reconnaissance" with its air force during the battle. Journalist Wassim Nasr stated that while airstrikes occurred, they were likely ineffective as ISGS had already moved positions. This claim was disputed by Le Monde, which stated that airstrikes did not occur, citing local sources. The next day, ISGS fighters withdrew from Talataye presuming a counterattack, and JNIM-MSA forces regained control of the town.

== Losses and aftermath ==
RFI claimed that losses for both ISGS and JNIM would be "numerous", although the MSA stated only four soldiers were killed by ISGS.

Several dozen civilians were killed in the fighting. A local elected official in Talataye reported the deaths of at least 45 inhabitants, while an MSA official claimed 30 civilians were killed, including children. ACLED reported the deaths of at least 30 civilians, 17 ISGS militants, and 3 Tuareg militiamen from the MSA. The United Nations reported that 100 civilians ACLED also stated that 900 civilians had been killed in the surrounding area since the ISGS offensives in March. 2,400 civilians fled from Talataye preceding and following the battle.
