= 2011 Tabankort raid =

2011 raid involving French and Nigerien commandos in Niger and Mali

Raid on Tabankort (2011)
- Part of Islamist insurgency in the Sahel
Date	January 8, 2011
Location	near Tabankort, Gao Region, Mali
Result	Indecisive: French and Nigerien forces fail to retrieve the hostages; AQIM fails to hold the hostages

Belligerents
France; Niger	AQIM

Strength
200 men 3 Cougar helicopters 1 C-160; 1 Atlantique 2 ~20 men 2 pickups	6 men initially 5–10 reinforcements 2 vehicles

Casualties and losses
2 injured 3 killed, 3 injured	4 killed
- 2 hostages killed

On January 8, 2011, French and Nigerien commandos attempted to retrieve two French nationals taken hostage by AQIM militants in Niamey in Niger, and who were subsequently brought into the desert near Tabankort in Mali. Both hostages were killed during the botched rescue operation, along with three Nigerien soldiers and four kidnappers. The rescue operation's failure sparked controversy in France as it was reported that one of the hostages was killed by French gunfire.

== Kidnapping ==
On January 7, 2011, a six-man team of AQIM jihadists raided Niamey, the capital of Niger, with the goal of capturing Westerners to be used for ransom. The commando team included a man sent by Boko Haram. The jihadists reached Niamey that evening aboard a Toyota Land Cruiser and entered the Toulousain restaurant, frequented by Western nationals and diplomats. The parking attendants at the Toulousain did not raise alarm as the militants were dressed in military uniforms, with the attendants believing the jihadists were soldiers. At 10:40 p.m., the jihadists burst into the restaurant. Two jihadists guarded the entrance while two others ordered two Frenchmen to follow them. Some customers tried to intervene, but stood down after the jihadists pointed weapons in their face. The jihadists fled the restaurant with the hostages within a minute, and left the city by heading northeast. The remaining fifteen European nationals in the restaurant hid in the bathroom until the jihadists left, and only a Nigerian professor chased the militants although he got lost.

The two hostages were 25 year-old Antoine de Léocour, an expat and humanitarian worker who was set to marry a Nigerian woman that month, and 25 year-old Vincent Delory, an engineer and friend of Antoine's who was in Niamey to attend the wedding.

== Pursuit of the kidnappers ==
As the jihadists left Niamey, their vehicle got a flat tire and the militants took some time to change it before heading back towards the Malian border. Although the Nigerien-Malian border is only two hours from Niamey, the militants took many long detours and were in Ouallam at 3am. Meanwhile, Nigerien gendarmes notified all barracks in the area of the kidnapping. Two pickups with around twenty soldiers from the National Guard of Niger and the Gendarmerie Nationale set off in search of the jihadists. Seven others left Niamey, including former Tuareg rebels that had joined the National Guard and knew the border area very well.

After an hour of driving, the Nigerien forces located the jihadists' vehicle which wasn't moving. The jihadists opened fire on the soldiers and seriously injured Captain Alhadi Ibrahim, a former Tuareg rebel, before driving off. The Nigerien National Guard returned to the barracks to save Ibrahim and only the gendarmes continued the pursuit. The jihadists entered Mali on the morning of January 8, and called for a group of reinforcements. A second AQIM vehicle came to their location.

French special forces ordered Nigerien forces not to continue pursuing the jihadists, although the Nigerien gendarmes who had entered Mali did not receive the message. When the Nigerien gendarmes caught up to the jihadists who were parked, the Nigeriens approached them to ask for information assuming they were a group of Tuaregs. The jihadists opened fire and killed a gendarme and injured four others, including a captain who was shot in the head. The four wounded gendarmes were taken prisoner, and the surviving gendarmes fled. The jihadists then fled into Mali and brought the gendarmes' pickup.

== Raid ==
French forces prepared their troops in Ouagadougou for a raid on the jihadists. French president Nicolas Sarkozy, who was on a trip to the Antilles and Defense Minister Alain Juppé gave the green light to intervene. Head of the Special Operations Command (COS) Frederic Beth mobilized 200 men for the operation. An Atlantique 2 plane took off from N'Djamena and followed the jihadists using infrared and thermal cameras and although the plane briefly lost sight of them, relocated them around 4 a.m. Three Cougar helicopters took off from Ouagadougou; one carrying machine guns and the other two carrying twenty soldiers from the 1st Marine Infantry Parachute Regiment and the 13th Parachute Dragoon Regiment. The helicopters were followed by a C-160 for refueling.

The raid began at 11 a.m. near Tabankort, Mali. Ten parachutists from the C-160 were dropped first, and then the helicopters landed to release the commandos. As soon as they landed, the French helicopters were surprised by the militants as they hid in bushes and shot at the helicopters, damaging them. One of the pilots was injured by a jihadist with a Dragunov rifle. French forces then opened fire and destroyed the pickups, burning two jihadists in their vehicle. The pickup transporting the Nigerien gendarmes was also destroyed and two of them were killed and two further injured in the friendly fire. The remaining jihadists fled, with one executing hostage Antoine de Lecouer three hundred meters from the French forces. Several jihadists escaped but two were killed when fleeing.

== Aftermath ==
Two French hostages, three Nigerien gendarmes, and four jihadists were killed during the raid. Two French soldiers and three Nigerien soldiers were injured.

An autopsy concluded that Vincent Delory's body had "extremely severe" burns and five gunshot wounds when he was caught in the crossfire and did not cause his death. The coroner stated that Vincent burned to death, and the cloud of dust from the battle contributed to the poor visibility. Mauritanian journalist Mohamed al-Amine Ould Mohamedou Ould M'Balle (Mouawiya for short) interviewed by Libération stated that after the jihadists returned to their katiba, kidnappers who had survived told Mouawiya that Delory had been killed when the Land Cruiser caught fire from the French shooting at it, and Lecouer had been killed by Algerian jihadist Faisal al-Jazairi when Lecouer slowed down al-Jazairi's escape.

The French paratroopers discovered the Nigerien gendarmes in ragged uniforms and assumed them to be jihadists, so they took them prisoner. Only when French troops returned to Niamey did they realize they were soldiers when their comrades identified them.

The deaths of Delory and Lecouer sparked controversy over French hostage-retrieval tactics in the Sahel after it was revealed that Delory had been killed by French fire. French authorities were said to have allowed the strike to dissuade jihadists from taking hostages even if the raid meant risking the lives of the hostages. This change in doctrine was confirmed by French investigative journalist Vincent Nouzille citing French colonel Jacques Hogard. COS commander Frederic Beth denied these allegations.

An AQIM statement on January 13 mocked the French and Nigerien failure in retrieving the hostages, and falsely claimed that 25 Nigerien soldiers were killed or injured in the fighting.
