= Battle of Ouraren (2011) =

- Part of Jihadist insurgency in Niger
| Date | June 12, 2011 |
| Location | Arlit, Niger 19°31′23″N 7°11′29″E |
| Result | Nigerien victory |

Belligerents
| Niger | (Islamic State) al-Qaeda in the Islamic Maghreb |

Strength
| Unknown | 20~ |

Casualties and losses
| 1 | 1 |

The Battle of Ouraren was fought between Niger and al-Qaeda in the Islamic Maghreb on 12 June 2011.

== Battle ==
On June 12, 2011, in Ouraren, 80 kilometers from Arlit, a patrol of the Nigerien National Guard surprises a group of fighters who had come from Libya, with three stationary pick-up trucks.

== Aftermath ==
The skirmish results in one casualty on each side, with 6 military personnel injured. The Nigerien forces seize one of the three pick-up trucks, loaded with 640 kg of explosives and 435 detonators. Additionally, they discover military uniforms and $90,000 in cash. The other two vehicles flee, pursued by the Nigerien forces.
