= Battle of Wisil =

2021 battle of the Somali Civil War

- Part of Somali Civil War (2009–present)
Date	27 June 2021
Location	Wisil, Mudug, Somalia
Result	Somali victory

Belligerents
Somali National Army Galmudug Derwishes	Al-Shabaab

Casualties and losses
17 killed	41 killed
- 13 civilians and militiamen killed 30+ injured Thousands of civilians displaced

On June 27, 2021, militants from al-Shabaab attacked Somali soldiers and civilian militiamen at a military base in Wisil, Mudug, Somalia. At least 17 soldiers and 13 civilians were killed in the attack, along with dozens of al-Shabaab fighters.

== Background ==
Al-Shabaab is a jihadist militant group that has been fighting the Somali government since 2009. On June 26, a day before the attack in Wisil, al-Shabaab militants detonated a bomb in the Shibis district of Mogadishu, killing eleven civilians.

== Battle ==
The al-Shabaab militants attacked the Somali base in Wisil with two suicide car bombs. In a statement on Radio al-Andalus, the al-Shabaab media apparatus, the group stated that the VBIED was driven by a fighter named Sagaar Mad Hurow, nom de guerre Abdullahi Jeri, from Rabdhure District. A Somali government spokesman stated that the goal of the jihadists was to assault and overrun the Somali base and capture the town of Wisil in the process. After the suicide bombings, al-Shabaab fighters assaulted the base. Pro-government civilian militias in the town came to the Somali soldiers' defenses, mitigating al-Shabaab fighters' attempts to overrun the base. A survivor of the battle stated that many civilians hid as the fighting erupted, and that the suicide bombings had damaged military vehicles.

Al-Shabaab claimed that they had captured the base and controlled the area for four hours before Somali reinforcements recaptured the area. Somali forces in Galmudug stated that the jihadists were never able to capture the area, and were repulsed.

== Aftermath ==
Somali government forces stated that 17 soldiers and 13 civilians were killed in the attack, along with at least 41 al-Shabaab fighters. A survivor in Wisil during the attack said that he had seen at least 30 people injured, and Somali officials later stated that all injured personnel and civilians were flown to Mogadishu for treatment. Al-Shabaab claimed to have killed 34 Somali soldiers and militiamen. Thousands of civilians were displaced from Wisil and surrounding towns during and after the attack.

Following the attack, Somali Prime Minister Mohamed Hussein Roble and Galmudug President Qoor-Qoor visited Wisil on June 28. Roble and Qoor-Qoor both stated that airstrikes and counter-offensives against al-Shabaab would begin in the region.
