= Battle of Hawadley =

2023 battle of the Somali Civil War

- Part of Somali Civil War
Date	January 17–19, 2023
Location	Hawadley, Hirshabelle State, Somalia
Result	Somali victory

Belligerents
Somalia: Somali National Army; NISA	al-Shabaab

Casualties and losses
10 (per Somalia); 63 (per al-Shabaab)	49+ (per Somalia)

On January 17, 2023, al-Shabaab attacked a Somali army base in the town of Hawadley, Hirshabelle State, Somalia. In response, the Somali army launched counter-operations to secure the area.

== Background ==
In late 2022, the Somali government under Hassan Sheikh Mohamud launched a massive counteroffensive against al-Shabaab in Somalia's Hirshabelle State. In the offensive, Somali forces recovered large swaths of the state, including Runirgod District, Ceel Guud, and Harardhere. In these offensives, they captured the town of Hawadley in late October.

== Battles ==
The day of the attack, al-Shabaab militants placed a car with explosives outside the Somali Army's military base in Hawadley. Immediately afterward, jihadists stormed the base and shot at the Somali soldiers. Somali forces were able to hold onto the base. A Somali commander from a nearby town stated that seven Somali soldiers, including the base's commander, were killed in the attack. This number later rose to ten soldiers killed. al-Shabaab, immediately after the attack, claimed the deaths of sixty-three Somali soldiers.

Two days later, the Somali army in collaboration with NISA attacked al-Shabaab bases at farms on the outskirts of Hawadley. Forty-nine al-Shabaab fighters were killed in the battle. The attack was launched in response to the Hawadley base attack.
