= Battle of Garn-Akassa =

2009 Battle between Mali and Al-Qaeda in Mali

- Part of the Insurgency in the Maghreb (2002–present)
Date	June 16, 2009; 17 years ago
Location	Garn-Akassa, Tessalit Cercle, Kidal Region, Mali
Result	Malian victory

Belligerents
Mali	AQIM

Casualties and losses
None	16–26 killed

On June 16, 2009, Malian forces clashed with jihadists from Al-Qaeda in the Islamic Maghreb in Garn-Akassa, Kidal Region, Mali.

== Background ==
In the late 2000s, jihadists from Al-Qaeda in the Islamic Maghreb had an extensive network of bases in the Adrar des Ifoghas of rural Kidal Region, Mali. Two weeks before the battle in Garn-Akassa, AQIM executed the English hostage Edwin Dyer, sparking international condemnation. A week later, AQIM assassinated the Malian colonel Lamana Ould Bou at his home in Timbuktu. Bou was considered AQIM's highest-priority target, as he had helped release several European hostages and contributed to the arrests of several high-ranking jihadist leaders.

== Battle ==
The offensive against the jihadists in Garn-Akassa was the first major military operation conducted by Mali since the beginning of the AQIM insurgency in 2005. While little is known about what occurred, the offensive took place in and around the locality of Garn-Akassa, west of Tessalit and on the border with Algeria and Mali. A Malian security source stated that "when [they] took possession of the Islamist base, we counted 26 enemies killed. Some were even buried in a mass grave by the Salafists who fled." One source told AFP that it was "certain that Malians have taken control of a perimeter hitherto considered a zone of action of the jihadists. The reports reaching us show 16 deaths." The Malian army stated there were no losses within their ranks.
