= Ougarou =

Ougarou Ougarau
- Location in Burkina Faso
- Coordinates: 12°26′N 0°10′E
- Country: Burkina Faso
- Region: Est Region
- Province: Gnagna Province
- Department: Bilanga Department

Population (2019)
  - Total: 6,686

Ougarou is a town in the Bilanga Department of Gnagna Province in eastern Burkina Faso.

Population
Year	Pop.	±%
1985	1,858	—
2006	4,273	+130.0%
2019	6,686	+56.5%
