= Namssiguia =

Village in Bourzanga Department, Burkina Faso

Namssiguia Namsiguya
- Location in Burkina Faso
- Coordinates: 13°50′N 1°36′W
- Country: Burkina Faso
- Region: Centre-Nord Region
- Province: Bam Province
- Department: Bourzanga Department

Population (2019)
  - Total: 6,759
- Time zone: UTC+0 (GMT 0)

Namssiguia is a town in the Bourzanga Department of Bam Province in northern Burkina Faso.

Population
Year	Pop.	±%
1985	2,183	—
2006	3,163	+44.9%
2019	6,759	+113.7%

== Jihadist Insurgency ==
The town has been a hotspot during the Jihadist insurgency in Burkina Faso, with multiple recorded attacks occurring around the town. On 15 January 2022, Islamist militants killed looted the town, killing ten people. Since the siege of Djibo, the town has been regularly targeted by IED attacks due to its location on the N22 highway linking Djibo to the rest of the country.
