= Volunteers for the Defense of the Homeland =

Auxiliary force in Burkina Faso

- Volontaires pour la défense de la patrie
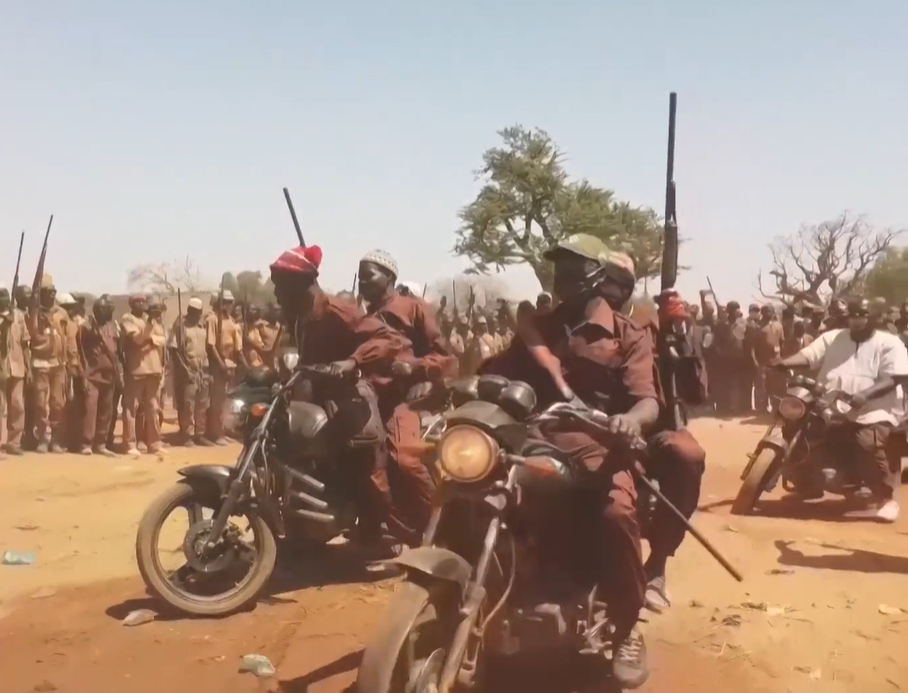
- VDP fighters in 2021
- Leader: Ladji Yoro †
- Dates active: 2020 – present
- Active regions: Burkina Faso
- Size: 30,000–100,000 (September 2023)

The Volunteers for the Defense of the Homeland (French: Volontaires pour la défense de la patrie, abbr. VDP) is an auxiliary and irregular force in Burkina Faso. Formed to fight jihadist insurgents in the country, it operates as an auxiliary force supporting the Burkina Faso Armed Forces.

== History ==
On 7 November 2019, following a jihadist attack on a mining convoy, the president of Burkina Faso called for the creation of a civilian self-defense force. On 21 January 2020, the parliament of Burkina Faso passed a law establishing the Volunteers for the Defense of the Homeland. The law stipulated that people could voluntarily join the VDP and that after 14 days of training they were to be equipped with communication and vision equipment, together with weapons. Members of the VDP have been accused of the murder of 19 men near Manja Hien in February 2020, and attacks on Peuhle villages in Yatenga, in which 43 people were killed.

On 4 June 2021, during the Solhan and Tadaryat massacres, jihadists attacked VDP barracks before attacking civilians. On 11 June 2021, six VDP fighters were killed in a jihadist ambush in Kogolbaraogo. In December 2021 a jihadist attack killed many VDP fighters including one of their leaders, Ladji Yoro.

The VDP was possibly grouped into the Burkina Faso Armed Forces, or legitimized into the government, as referenced by Ibrahim Traoré.
