= Chadian intervention in northern Mali =

Military intervention since 2013 during the Mali War

Chadian Intervention in Mali
- Part of the Mali War
Date	18 January 2013 – April 2013
Location	Northern Mali

Belligerents
Chad Mali	AQIM; MUJAO

Commanders and leaders
(Chad) Idriss Déby (Chad) Mahamat Déby (Chad) Abdel Aziz Hassane Adam † (Chad) Omar Bikimo	Abdelhamid Abou Zeïd †; Mokhtar Belmokhtar † (?)

Strength
2,250 men 240 vehicles	Unknown

Casualties and losses
100 killed	~125 killed

Chadian intervention in northern Mali (French: Forces Armées Tchadiennes d'Intervention au Mali, FATIM) refers to military intervention by Chad during the Mali War. Since its first deployment, the Chadian military has suffered 100 casualties.

== Timeline ==
=== 2013 ===
On January 18, 2013, the Republic of Chad announced its intent to deploy 2,000 troops: one infantry regiment with 1,200 soldiers and two support battalions with 800 soldiers, into Mali as part of the international campaign against Islamist insurgents. The same day, the arrival of the Chadian army in Niamey was confirmed. The Chadian forces were not part of the African-led International Support Mission to Mali but integrated into an existing French command structure. The deployment was sometimes referred to as FATIM (Forces Armées Tchadiennes d'Intervention au Mali).

Backed by technicals and Eland-90 armoured cars, Chadian forces entered Mali via Niger, securing the former Islamist town of Ménaka on 28 January. According to a statement by the French Ministry of Defense, Chadian forces left their base in Ménaka and headed towards the north of the country in support of Malian armed forces in the area.

On January 31, some 1,800 Chadian soldiers entered the city of Kidal without resistance, as French forces captured the outskirts of the city a few days prior to the formal capture. The Chadian army contributed to the security of the city, currently held by the MNLA.

On February 7, in the evening Chadian and French forces entered the town of Aguelhok.

On February 8, French and Chadian forces announced they captured the town of Tessalit near the Algerian border, the seat of one of the last airports still held by insurgents.

On February 12, according to numerous sources, a Chadian soldier succumbed to an illness, marking the first death since the Chadian intervention began in late January.

On February 22, supported by French fighters, the Chadian army launched a joint military operation with the support of French war jets on an Islamists base said to be of "significant importance", where 8 French hostages were believed to be held along with caches of heavy weaponry, artillery shells, anti-tank weapons, and mines were said to be hidden in the mountains of the Adrar des Ifoghas. By the end of the day, the mission was considered to be a success with 93 Islamists killed or captured, but leaving 26 Chadian soldiers dead and 52 others severely wounded, the dead included several high-ranking Chadian commanders in Mali, including special forces commander Abdel Aziz Hassane Adam.

On February 25, during a joint military operation in the Adrar des Ifoghas mountains, Chadian forces reported the killing of al-Qaeda right-hand leader of AQIM, Abou Zeïd, along with 40 of his followers. It's unknown whether he was killed by French airstrikes or by Chadian ground forces, as the information was neither confirmed nor denied by the French Government.

On March 1, the Chadian army claimed to have killed Mokhtar Belmokhtar. According to a government statement, Mokhtar along with several other extremists were killed, and weapons, equipment, and 40 vehicles were seized. In April, the Chadian government dismissed their previous claim of killing Mokhtar, saying he blew himself up, along with several other militants, in despair after learning about the death of Abou Zeïd.

On March 12, a Chadian soldier was killed in a skirmish along with six Islamists, according to military officials.

On April 12, a suicide bomber detonated his explosive belts while a group of Chadian soldiers were passing by in a busy market in Kidal, killing four soldiers and the bomber in the blast, which also injured five civilians.

On April 14, Chadian president Idriss Déby Itno announced the full withdrawal of Chadian soldiers from Mali, citing face to face with the Islamists is over and the Chadian army doesn't have the skills to fight a guerilla-style war, referring to the previous attack in Kidal that killed four of its soldiers. According to local sources the army had already withdrawn a mechanized battalion a few days prior to the formal announcement and pulled out its troops from Aguelhok and Tessalit.

On April 15, the Chadian parliament voted overwhelmingly for a resolution for the withdrawal of Chadian forces in Mali, "within a reasonable timeframe". The same day the Chadian army announced that it lost 36 soldiers during the three-month intervention in northern Mali and suffered another 74 wounded. In total the presence of Chadian soldiers in Mali costs the country 57 billion CFA francs (87 million). During the intervention, at least 2,250 soldiers were deployed with 250 vehicles and a heavy amount of supplies.

On April 17, tension grew between the separatists Tuareg group MNLA and the Chadian army stationed in Kidal. The MNLA accused the Chadian army of planning to allow Malian forces to be deployed to the city and firing on unarmed civilians during demonstrations against Chadian military rule.

== See also ==
- Military history of Chad
