= Battle of Ifoghas =

2013 battle in northern Mali

Coordinates: 19.5250°N 1.2200°E

- Part of Operation Panther and the Mali War
Date	18 February – 31 March 2013
Location	Adrar des Ifoghas, Kidal Region, Mali
Result	French/Chadian victory

Belligerents
France; Chad	Ansar Dine; MOJWA; AQIM; Boko Haram; Al-Mulathameen

Commanders and leaders
Gen. Bernard Barrera; Gen. Oumar Bikimo; Gen. Mahamat Déby Itno; Captain Abdel Aziz Hassane Adam †	Iyad Ag Ghaly; Ibrahim Ag Inawalen; Djamel Okacha; Abou Zeïd †; Abdelkrim al-Targui; Sedane Ag Hita

Units involved
French Army; Chadian Ground Forces	No specific units

Strength
1,400; 1,400–1,500	400–600

Casualties and losses
(France) 3 killed (France) 120 wounded 30 killed unknown number wounded	200–300 killed 50 captured

The Battle of Ifoghas, also known as the Battle of Tigharghâr or the Battle of the Ametettai, took place from 18 February to 31 March 2013, during the Northern Mali conflict. The French army and the Chadian army fought armed Salafist jihadist groups led by Al Qaeda in the Islamic Maghreb and Ansar Dine. After being defeated in January in the Battle of Konna and the Battle of Diabaly, the jihadists abandoned Timbuktu and retreated into the Adrar Tigharghar, a mountain of the Adrar of Ifoghas in northeastern Mali, which has been their sanctuary for years. The French started quickly a pursuit, and they took control of the towns of Tessalit and Aguelhok and begun the operation Panther in the Tigharghar. The first clashes erupt on February 18 and are mainly concentrated in the Ametettai Valley. It is caught between two armored columns, one French to the west and another Chadian to the east, while the paratroopers manage to surprise the jihadists by attacking on foot from the north. The valley is taken on March 3 and jihadists begin to gradually abandon the Tigharghar. Excavation missions and some skirmishes, however, continue to take place the following days. The operations cease on March 31. The battle was a turning point in the war, as with the capture of the Tigharghar, the jihadists lose their main sanctuary in the Sahel as well as most of their military arsenal, taken from the Malian army or Libya .

== Deployment of Franco-Chadian forces in the Kidal region ==
The evening of January 29, 2013, a flight of helicopters, including two Tigers, a Gazelle and four Puma reach Kidal airport and disembark 30 French soldiers of the CPA-10 and the Penfentenyo commando against MNLA pick-ups. They are followed by three planes landing men of 1 RPIMa and Commando de Montfort. The officer in charge of the French special forces then meets Colonel Mohamed Ag Najem, commander-in-chief of the MNLA's military wing. The French then settle in one of the two military camps of the city and begin their cohabitation with the Tuareg rebels, but unlike Gao, Timbuktu, and the southern cities where they had been celebrated as liberators, in Kidal the French are seen as the vanguard of the Malian army and the reception of the population is much colder. But the goal of the French army, at that time, remains the Tigharghar . From the end of January, the surroundings of the Adrar are bombarded by Rafale. Then on the evening of February 2, a first mass air raid struck the interior of the mountain; four Mirage and four Rafale destroy twelve objectives, supported by three Atlantic, a Harfang drone, an AWACS and Tiger helicopters. The raid mainly targets the area known as the "Garage", west of Ametettai, where two BMP-1 armored vehicles have been located, as well as an anti-aircraft battery that was probably inoperative. On 1 February, a column of fifteen vehicles of the MNLA and thirty men from the French Special Forces leave Kidal to conduct a joint operation towards the Adrar Tigharghar . The night of 2 to 3, the French and the Tuaregs separate. The first pursued towards the valley of Assamalmal, targeted a few hours earlier by the air strikes. On the spot, the balance sheet is rather thin, no body nor destroyed vehicle is discovered, only a stock of gasoline and some motorcycles were swept by the bombs. The Touareg rebels, meanwhile, take control of the town of Aguelhok where the French come back from Assamalmal to join them. The population, strongly hostile to jihadists, welcomes newcomers. The MNLA captured some suspects and discovered several hundred kilos of ammunition, which he then handed over to the French forces as a sign of goodwill. France was also seeking the help of Chad's President Idriss Déby. He agreed to deploy his army in the Adrar of Ifoghas. On February 3, the first Chadian soldiers arrived in Kidal. On the night of February 7 to 8, the French special forces lead Operation Takouba on Tessalit. Thirty men from the 13 th RDP, CPA-10, a marine CTLO and the ESNO are parachuted near the airport. They spot a piece of runway where two C-160 Transall can land and land four vehicles and a few more men. From Aguel'hoc, the 30 soldiers - mainly from the 1st RPIMa - who had led the reconnaissance mission in the Assamalmal valley are also moving on Tessalit. In the morning, the special forces make their junction and enter the city without encountering any resistance. A few hours later, from Kidal, the Chadians of General Deby arrived on their turn after passing through Aguel'hoc. Then, 54 soldiers of the 1st RCP are deposited by a third plane. Finally, a sub-GTIA party from Gao, consisting mainly of soldiers from 1 RIMa and forming a column of 90 vehicles, arrives at the scene and invests the military camp of Amachach. On February 13, the Special Forces made a first foray into the Tigharghar during Operation Tazidert, whose goal is to find a record of the Western hostages held by AQIM. They infiltrate the "camp of the sands" and the "camp of the rocks", but find no trace of the hostages, or - to their surprise - jihadists. The operation ends on February 16. At the same time, GTIA 4 unfolds in the far north. 400 French soldiers are present in Tessalit on February 12. The first patrols, dubbed Panther 0 and Panther I, take place between Tessalit and the Tigharghar, but they encounter nothing.

== Order of Battle ==
=== Islamist coalition forces ===
Adrar Tigharghar was mainly the territory of AQIM and Ansar Dine, while MUJAO was more established in the region of Gao. However elements of the Signatories by the blood and Boko Haram were also present in the Adrar. Mercenaries from the Polisario Front also reportedly took part in the fighting despite the denials of the Sahrawi Arab Democratic Republic. Jihadist forces in Tigharghar were estimated at between 400 and 600 men. For the Directorate of Military Intelligence (DRM) the number of their fighters would be about 500. The Tuareg Islamists of Ansar Dine were led by their leader, Iyad Ag Ghali. On March 26, the movement said in a statement that it is continuing the fighting in northern Mali. Ag Ghali knows the region well, Adrar Tigharghar was already his base during the Tuareg rebellions, when he commanded the Popular Movement of Azawad. Among the other Ansar Dine chiefs present in the Adrar was Ibrahim Ag Inawalen, commander of the region of Aguel'hoc and former colonel of the Malian army. "Emir of the Sahara", Djamel Okacha, known as "Yahia Abu el-Hammam", the leader of the AQIM forces in Mali, according to a jihadist source of the Sahara Medias agency, he took part in the battle. Four brigade or katiba chiefs were subordinated to him. Abu Zeid, the emir of the katiba "Tarek Ibn Ziyad", participated in the battle. The presence of Abdelkrim al-Targui, chief of the katiba "al-Ansar" and Sedane Ag Hita, called "Abu Abdel Hakim al-Kidali", who commanded the katiba "Youssef Ibn Tachfin" were also possibly fought, as the area of Tigharghar being considered their domain. On the other hand, Mohamed Lemine Ould El-Hassen, emir of the katiba "al-Fourghan", was killed on 24 February by the French special forces during the Battle of Timetrine. In their radio communications, Islamist insurgents routinely nicknamed the French "dogs" and Chadians or helicopters as "flies". Excellent fighters with light weapons and with real military training, jihadists were much less skilled with heavy weapons, they include guns, SA-7 ground-to-air missiles or RPG -rocket launcher 29 which they do not know how to use. In comparison with the Taliban, which the French also faced in Afghanistan, the jihadists of Mali were considered better organized and more tenacious, able to sacrifice themselves while the Afghan insurgents used to flee to limit the losses. In contrast, FDIs were at this time less used than in Afghanistan and were generally poorly manufactured. Some fighters, including child soldiers, have also used drugs to support the shock of fighting, bags will be found near corpses including ketamine, an anesthetic that inhibits fear and erases pain.

=== French forces ===
French forces were divided into two Combat Task Forces (GTIA); each with more than 700 men.

The GTIA 3 was commanded by Colonel Francois-Marie Gougeon 101 and is composed of companies and sections from the following regiments:

- 2nd Marine Infantry Regiment ( 2nd RIMA)
- Marine Infantry Tank Regiment (RICM)
- 126th Infantry Regiment ( 126th IR)
- 11th Marine Artillery Regiment ( 11th Ra'A)
- 6th Engineer Regiment ( 6th GR)

GTIA 4, also known as GTIA TAP (airborne troops), was commanded by Colonel Benoît Desmeulles 102 and consists of companies and sections from the following regiments:

- 2nd Foreign Parachute Regiment 1st and 2nd Companies as well as GCP (2 REP)
- 1st regiment of paratroopers ( 1 RCP) a company
- 1st Parachute Hussar Regiment ( 1st RHP)
- 1st Marine Infantry Regiment ( 1st RIMA)
- 126th Infantry Regiment ( 126th IR)
- 35th Parachuteist Artillery Regiment ( 35th RAP)
- 17th Parachute Engineer Regiment ( 17 th RGP)
- 31st Regiment of Engineering ( 31st GR)

The Joint Air Group (GAM) was commanded by Colonel Frederic Gout and consisted of aircraft of the 5th Combat Helicopter Regiment ( 5th RHC). It included five Puma, three Gazelle and two Tiger helicopters based at Tessalit.

On the side of the air force, eight Rafale based in N'Djamena and six Mirage 2000D based in Bamako take turns bombing the Tigharghar. For the aerial reconnaissance, Operation Serval mobilized five Atlantique 2 and two Mirage F1 CRs. It also has a Harfang drone 108.

For the vehicles, 22 AMX-10 RC tanks are engaged in the battle 109 and for the two Caesar artillery of the 11th Marine Artillery Regiment ( 11th RAMa) are deployed and supported by an intelligence battery of 68 African Artillery Regiment ( 68th RAA).

Supply between Gao and Tessalit is provided by a logistic detachment of the 511th Train Regiment ( 511 th RT). The 9th Advanced Surgical Antenna, initially based in Sévaré, is deployed in Tessalit. The command of the land operations is assured by Brigadier General Bernard Barrera. A forward command post is established in Tessalit on 12 February . This staff, called the G08, is under the leadership of Colonel Laurent de Bertier de Sauvigny and Xavier Vanden Neste and is made up of about forty to fifty people from the 11th Parachute Brigade, a few officers of the 3rd Light Armored Brigade were soon amalgamated to form a centralized command post. The special forces and the DGSE set up in Kidal where they have a helicopter base, their mission being to locate the jihadist leaders and the hostages. The special forces are autonomous, they act without coordinating with the Serval brigade and do not come under the command of General Barrera. 1,200 French soldiers take part initially in the operation Panthère, at the end of the fighting their number is 1,400 . The majority of French soldiers engaged in battle have combat experience, most of them participated in the Afghanistan war, some even in the Gulf War . In addition to Afghanistan, the air forces also took part in Operation Harmattan in Libya . Many infantry have already experienced extreme heat similar to that of Tigharghâr in the FFDj Djibouti.

=== Chadian forces ===
On February 5, 1,800 Chadian soldiers were in Kidal. Their numbers changed during the fighting. In February, 800 men took part in the offensive on the Ametettai Valley, in mid-March 1,400 to 1,500 Chadian soldiers were deployed in the Adrar Tigharghâr. They had more than a hundred armored vehicles, including about ten BMP-1s 128. The elite troops of the presidential guard form the spearhead of this force, 500 of its members have been integrated into the contingent deployed in Mali. Troops of the National Guard and Nomad of Chad (GNNT) and the Close Action Detachment (DAR) were also engaged in the Adrar. Chadian forces in Mali were commanded by General Oumar Bikimo. The second command, initially ensured by General Abderrahmane Youssouf Meïri, passes from mid-February to General Mahamat Idriss Déby Itno, son of President Idriss Déby. From 2005 to 2010, the Chadian army fought hard during the Chadian civil war. Its soldiers, most of whom are of Zaghawa ethnicity, are accustomed to the climate and fighting in the desert and are considered to be by far the most experienced and seasoned African forces deployed in Mali.

== The campaign ==
=== Battle of the Tibeggatine Valley, February 18–20 ===
On February 18, the French army launched Operation Panther IV. The objective was to find the forces of AQIM and Ansar Dine, as the army had knowledge that jihadists were present in the Tigharghâr but did not know what their defense system and the areas they intend to protect as a priority. The operation begins with a reconnaissance mission conducted by GTIA 4 on In Taghlit, a village used by jihadists to stock up, in the Tibeggatine Valley, west of the Ametettai Valley. The column was made up of soldiers from 1st RIMa, GCP from 2nd REP and 17th RGP, artillerymen from 35th RAP and some Tuareg guides from the Malian army, about 150 men. The French entered the village of In Taghlit in the morning without encountering resistance. They found only a few unarmed men who all say that the jihadists had fled for a dozen days. The paratroopers then go to a nearby wadi and discover a first abandoned logistic depot. They unearth trucks filled with shells, a ton of food, telephones, an engine, gas drums and a large generator. In the afternoon, the French pushed their recognition to the village of Tabankort and camped there to spend the night. The next morning, they divided into two groups. The first, consisting of two platoons of porpoises goes north on the village of Abancko where intelligence suspects the presence of an ammunition depot. The soldiers meet an old man on the spot who guides them to a stockpile of shells that the jihadists had taken over the Malian army after the Battle of Tessalit. The second group headed for the area called the "Garage" bombed by aviation on February 2. Coming from the west, the French stop in front of two rocky mounds, about forty meters high, between which a vehicular passage runs eastward. Veteran officers who fought in Afghanistan and Tuareg guides suspect an ambush and the column is moving cautiously. Around 9 am, the leading vehicles were attacked by a jihadists ambush at 300 meters. A first group of a dozen fighters is located in a green zone a little further north. The soldiers retreat, take cover and half an hour later the Mirage 2000 D intervene and destroy a machine gun nest. The three AMX-10 RC tanks then take control of the neck between the two mounds and open fire with their 105 mm guns. Despite the intensity of the fire, the jihadists do not hesitate to move short in front of the tanks, they send some rockets with RPG-7, but the range is too fair. As for the tanks, they fire with thirty explosive shells. On their side, the paratroop legionaries of the 2nd REP attack the mound on the right with the aim of controlling the dominant position and to prevent the jihadists from overflowing from the south. They seize the summit but collide with other fighters on the counter. A legionnaire is killed, hit by a bullet that ricochets on his bullet-proof vest in the armpit and reaches him in the head. He collapses and his body rushes down the slope. On the left, the paratroopers of the 17th RGP are in turn attacked by a group posted about fifty meters. Returning from Abancko, the porpoises of 1st RIMa join the fight from the north. Then, at 10:45, a Mirage drops a GBU on the counterpoise. In the south, the jihadists were contained. The planes remained permanently on zone, supplied by an American tanker. Other Mirage 2000 D, then Rafale, a Puma helicopter loaded with ammunition and finally, at the end of the afternoon, two Tiger helicopters arrive on the scene. The clashes cease in the afternoon, after having lasted five hours. The French retreat about ten kilometers to the west, in an isolated area to spend the night there. According to the French staff, more than 20 jihadists were killed during the fighting. French Defense Minister Jean-Yves Le Drian mentions 25 killed. According to Jean-Christophe Notin, most of the losses were probably inflicted by the tanks of the 1st RIMa. The next morning, the column returns to Tessalit, but sone stay put with their tanks. Then in the afternoon, General Barrera decides to send two Tiger helicopters from Gao to check if the jihadists were still there. When the tigers arrived on the old battlefield, the two devices are extensively strafed. One of them is riddled with 21 impacts and fails to be shot. It retreats to Tessalit urgently. On the ground, the tanks of the 1 stRIMa open fire for an hour, while the second Tiger, less severely hit, and destroys a pickup in the green zone. According to Colonel Thierry Burkhard, spokesman for the staff of the armed forces, "a little less than a dozen terrorists" are "neutralized" during this day. Porpoises the 1 st RIMa fold again and hold their area for six days without being attacked. After the fighting on 19 and 20 February and the fierce resistance of the jihadists, the French staff is now convinced that the Ametettai Valley is the heart of the AQIM device in the Adrar. From the beginning of the fighting, the intelligence intercepted dozens of calls by satellite phones or mobile phones from the valley that had remained silent until then. The French army had "founded the enemy" and it could now prepare for the offensive. After crossing the border between Niger and Mali at the beginning of the month, the GTIA 3 leaves Gao on February 20, and arrives in the Adrar of the Ifoghas two days later. 1800 French soldiers are present at Tessalit.

=== Fighting East of the Amettetai Valley, February 22 ===
For their part, the Chadians were deployed east of the valley of Ametettai. A first column, left Tessalit and commanded by General Déby, bypassed the Tigharghar from the north, accompanied by a detachment of French special forces. Coming from Kidal, the second column led by General Bikimo arrived from the south. The two forces make their junction east of the Adrar. The February 22, after a few days, Chadian troops reached the eastern entrance to the Amettetai valley. Unlike the French who had advanced cautiously in the Tibeggatine Valley, Chadians were attacking in force. Shortly after 11 am, they clash with jihadists. Clashes broke out on several points of the wadi, but the bloodiest fighting took place on a hill, north of the entrance to the valley. The Chadians were launching a real charge. Many fall under the fire of jihadists entrenched in the caves and behind the rocks. Despite the losses the soldiers are "euphoric" and "galvanized", one of them, the commander Moussa, will declare: "The terrorists faced us. They say they are crazy. We too wanted to be more crazy than them ". The clashes were confusing, some soldiers chased after jihadists who retreated to a neighboring wadi, other Islamists ambushed the Chadians, by Chadians overtake them and then shoot them in the back. The fighters are too entangled and the French air force can not intervene. Chadians, however, form a line against the main Islamist position and deliver heavy fire with guns and machine guns. The jihadists repel the first assault but several others follow and the Chadians eventually reach the caves where the last insurgents deliver a desperate resistance. The fighters clash in hand-to-hand combat, a Chadian soldier declares: "In the caves, nothing was seen. We do not have lamps. We were shooting everywhere, hoping to kill them, then we went home. " Jihadists pretend to surrender before blowing themselves up, killing several soldiers. At the end of the day, the French air force drops two bombs and the fighting ends at dusk. The losses were very heavy. 26 Chadian soldiers were killed or fatally wounded, and according to sources about 70 were wounded. Commander Abdel Aziz Hassane Adam, leader of the special forces in Mali and number two of the Directorate of Reserved Actions (DAR), is among the dead. The only two doctors and nurses in the Chadian column were overwhelmed and the French had to send two Puma helicopters to evacuate the wounded by rotation to Tessalit's vital surgery module (MCV). The jihadists leave about 93 or 96 dead, about twenty prisoners and six vehicles destroyed according to the Chadian staff. For Jean-Christophe Notin, however, it is not impossible that the Chadians were able to exaggerate the losses of their opponents to compensate for theirs. In his war memos, General Barrera refers to a loss of dozens of men among jihadists. For its part, the group of Signatories by the blood is the only one among the jihadists to provide a balance sheet. On April 1, Moghrane, spokesman for the Katiba "Al-Muthalimin" challenged the figures of the Chadian staff and told the Nouakchott Agency of Information, "that during the offensive Tagharghart, where the Chadians had announced the death of 25 soldiers, only 5 mujahideen died.

=== Fights in Puebla and Sontay, February 26 ===
The Chadian column is victorious but has been severely affected by the fighting in eastern Amettetai, in addition to the casualties of many vehicles. No offensive was launched on February 23. On 24 February, Brigadier General Barrera left Gao and headed in Tessalit to conduct the next round of operations. The general of division Gregory de Saint-Quentin, chief of the operation Serval, entrusts to him the command of the terrestrial operations in the Adrar Tigharghar. The French army then planned its offensive, it plans to resume the attack on the west with the GTIA 3 and to surprise the jihadists by advancing the GTIA 4 north, on foot, through the mountainous terrain. According to General Barrera's war notes, the plan was partly inspired by the Battle of Dobro Pole and Operation Diadem. However, the French-Chadian forces were not numerous enough to cover the south. The zone of the south is then left to the surveillance of air forces. On the night of February 25 to 26, Operation Panther III begins. The GTIA 4 leaves Tessalit, more than 500 parachutists are loadeded on all available vehicles: VAB, GBC 180 trucks and even TRM 10000. The convoy was heading east for 80 kilometers. Around 3 pm, the parachutists were disembarked and deployed about ten kilometers north of the Ametettai. Colonel Desmeulles places the 1st RIMa tank platoon in the west, the 2nd company of the 2nd REP in the center and the company of the 1st RCP in the east. Two other companies of the 2nd REP are behind the leading units. For the parachutists, a long and trying walk begins, each soldier carries about 50 kilos of water, food and equipment in heat that can exceed 50 degrees. Every night, the troop must be refueled by helicopters, mainly in water. The first day, the progression is slower than expected, the GTIA 4 advance one kilometer and a half. For their part, armored GTIA 3 commanded by Colonel Gougeon set in motion at 3 am west of the Ametettai. Two Caesars from Gao also reach the entrance of the valley at dawn, just arrived they open fire to cover the advance of the column. After 5 kilometers of road, the GTIA 3 arrives at the scene of the fight of 19 February but no jihadist appears. The French continue their progression and reach the crests of Sontai and Puebla. This time the jihadists were present, dozens of fighters open fire, sometimes within 100 meters of the French. Some are ambushed at the top of the ridges, others on the counterpoise or in a green zone below, entrenched in huts or hidden in holes About ten porpoises moved on a height and aviation intervenes according to their indications. Airplanes drops Mark 82 and GBU-12 bombs while mortars and Caesar shell Islamist positions. The AMX-10 RC tanks and the VABs also take position at the top of the counter-flank and are missed by five RPG-7 rockets. Meanwhile, a 2nd RIMa sniper kills a jihadist in motion at more than 1,000 meters. Exchanges of artillery and light weapon fire lasted several hours, but the French held the summit of the ridges and the attempts of the jihadists to circumvent them were repulsed. The fight ended at the end of the afternoon, when the Caesar and the mortars make a synchronized shot on two combat positions. Around 7 pm, the jihadists unhook and take away their dead, Sontay and Puebla are in the hands of the French. These consolidate their positions to spend the night. Their losses were three wounded, those of jihadists were estimated at fifteen killed. GTIA 3 resumes its course the next morning, but shortly after its departure a VBL jumps on an anti-tank mine and two soldiers, including a captain, were wounded. For their part, the Chadians have resumed their progress to the east but they also encounter mines that also wounded some of them. To the north, GTIA 4 continues to advance. In the afternoon, tanks and aviation opened fire on a battle station. While further east, the legionnaires collide with a first group of half a dozen fighters armed with machine guns and rocket launchers. The clash lasts about six hours and the planes intervene again. The next day, an armor BRDM-2 is destroyed by two Rafale.

=== Bombings in In Sensa and death of Abu Zeid ===
On February 27, a concentration of jihadist vehicles with forty men is spotted by the French in the crossroads called the "Garage". Around 3 pm, their communications are intercepted, a leader expresses himself in Arabic and affirms to be Abu Zeid. At 17:30, the Mirage 2000 D intervene and drop three bombs "Airburst". Five minutes later, the Caesar cannon opened fire and dispatched 12 explosive rounds. Troops on the ground were not able to check the extent of the damage on the spot, but according to General Barrera, "the shows stop" and then some interceptions indicate a "very hard blow". After the strikes, the images filmed by the air force no longer detect any movement. But thereafter, different versions were given on the circumstances of the death of Abdelhamid Abu Zeid. On February 28, the Algerian television channel Ennahar is the first to announce the death of the AQIM leader. The channel claims that the latter was killed by French forces in the Adrar Tigharghar with about forty combatants, but sets the date of his death to Monday, February 25. The same day, Paris-Match reports that according to the MNLA and notables of the city of Kidal, 45 men of AQIM and Ansar Dine were killed on Saturday, February 23 by an air raid of the French army in the area. In Sensa, on the bases of Tinwelène and Ticherfen. The MNLA also claims to have supported the French special forces and captured seven survivors - four from the region, an Algerian, a Mauritanian and a member of the Polisario - then handed over to the French. Another AQIM leader, Sedane Ag Hita, the commander of the katiba "Youssef Ibn Tachfin", fled to Aguel'hoc after escaping the bombings. He made contact with the MNLA present in the city and reported having defected from AQIM. He is said to have testified to the death of Abu Zeid and 43 of his men allegedly by him in the area of In Sensa and Etagh, near Tabankort on 23 February. For its part, the French newspaper Le Monde announces on March 1 that the death of Abu Zeid is confirmed by a "reliable source close to the ongoing military operations in northern Mali . " It would have occurred in the "very last days" in the Etagho area and 43 fighters of his katiba would have been killed with him. Colonel Thierry Burkhard, spokesman for the French armies, then said he had "no specific information on this person" but confirmed that a French air raid took place in the In Sensa area and destroyed six vehicles. In January 2014, in Kidal, AFP journalist Serge Daniel meets a young Touareg from Tessalit nicknamed "Tic - Tac", a battle survivor in Tigharghar. "Tic-Tac" claims to be non-Islamist and to have joined Ansar Dine out of admiration for his leader Iyad Ag Ghali . He gives more details about the death of Abu Zeid which he claims to have witnessed. According to him, the convoy of the fighters of AQIM and Ansar Dine was about sixty kilometers from Tessalit when it is attacked by French planes. Abu Zeid, driving the lead vehicle, is killed instantly by the first strike. Iyad Ag Ghali is then right behind him, driving the second vehicle of the convoy. Mad with rage, almost in a trance, he throws himself on the 14.5 mm machine gun stuck on his own pickup shouting " Allahu akbar ". It is ultimately his own men who must force him out after seeing a second plane. Iyad Ag Ghali narrowly survives the bombing that follows, his vehicle is sprayed shortly after being abandoned. Hiding in the bushes with some of his relatives, he manages to win another pickup hidden behind tarpaulins, with which he finally manages to escape. According to journalist Serge Daniel, this "version of the facts corresponds to the information collected from military sources in the Sahel region". On March 1, Chadian President Idriss Deby gave a completely different version and declares that Abu Zeid was killed by his troops in the fight of February 22, east of the Ametettai: "On February 22 we lost our soldiers in the Ifoghas massif after destroying the base of the jihadists. This is the first time that there has been a face to face with the jihadists. Our soldiers shot down two jihadist leaders, including Abu Zeid, and freed Tessalit. " Then on Saturday, March 2, Chad claimed the death of Mokhtar Belmokhtar and said: "Chadian forces in Mali have totally destroyed the main base of jihadists in the Adrar mountains of Ifoghas, more precisely in the valley. Chad relied on prisoner testimonies, as well as on photographs taken by soldiers. However, on 4 March, the Mauritanian agency Sahara Media announces that according to the statements posted on the same day by an AQIM member, Abu Zeid was killed "by a French aerial bombardment in the mountains" and "not by the Chadians " The jihadist also denies the death of Mokhtar Belmokhtar and claims that the latter fights in the region of Gao and not in the Adrar of Ifoghas. The announcements of the Chadian government, especially that concerning Belmokhtar, were rechived with skepticism by the French. The clash took place about fifteen kilometers from the Garage and it appears that the Chadians have exaggerated their success because jihadists still largely held the valley of Amettetaï. The staff then addresses Commander Jack, the leader of the French Special Forces detachment accompanying the Chadian column. He was present during the fight of February 22 but he himself learned the death of Abu Zeid only by the press. However, he obtained from Chadian soldiers photos of a corpse resembling the jihadist leader and the indication of the place where he was buried. On March 3 and 4, the special forces went on the spot by helicopter and collected fragments on the body which were then given to the DRS, the Algerian intelligence services, to be compared with members of his family. The DNA tests prove conclusive and on March 23 the French government officially confirms the death of Abu Zeid. On 1 April, following contact with the Nouakchott Information Agency, Belmokhtar's death is belied by Hamada Ould Mohamed Kheirou, head of MUJAO, and by Moghrane, spokesman for Katiba "Al- Mouthalimin "(the turbaned), Signatories by blood. However, on June 16, 2013, AQIM officially confirms the death of Abu Zeid. The exact circumstances of his death - Chadian bullets, French bombardment or suicide - remain however unknown.

=== Taking the Amettetai Valley, from February 28 to March 3 ===
On February 28, GTIA 3 continued slowly west of Amettetai, uncovering several weapons stocks as deminers probe the terrain for mines and FDI. Meanwhile, in the north, two sections of the 2nd company of the 2nd REP, supported by a Tiger, attacked at 1 o'clock a group of jihadists entrenched on a height spotted the day before. The clash lasts five hours and ends with a grenade at the bottom of the caves. About 10 to 15 jihadists are killed, some are slaughtered within five meters by legionaries paratroopers. The French have only one injured, hit by a bullet in the helmet. To the east, Chadians still face mines and eight of their soldiers are wounded. A combat post is also destroyed by the air force on the same day and 15 jihadists spotted by a Harfang drone are eliminated by the strikes of a Mirage 2000D. On the 28th, the French army announces that it estimates that the fights delivered the previous days made about 130 dead among the Islamists. An official of the administration of Aguel'hoc, also says that a young boy from the city was surprised by the Islamists and executed for setting pointing devices for the French air strikes. The same day, a sub-group maintained in reserve in Tessalit leads the Septenkéro operation. An agreement had recently been reached in which Algeria undertook to supply the French army with fuel to confront AQIM. The French soldiers leave to meet the Algerian soldiers on the Bordj Badji Mokhtar border, in front of the Malian city of In Khalil, held by the MNLA . The reception is very cold, the Algerians show themselves with weapons, helmets and bulletproof vests and fly over the area by many helicopters. Four other Septenkéro operations will still be conducted between 8 and 25 March. On the morning of March 1, the men of GTIA 4 reached northern Amettetai. The valley then undergoes its most massive bombardment since the beginning of the battle; shots of helicopters, mortars, more than 20 explosive shells shipped by Caesar and fourteen other smoke bombs to cover infantry advance. The 3rd company of the 2nd REP then crosses the valley to reach the southern heights, while the 2nd company remains on the northern heights. However, the forces deployed east and west were delayed by the mines and around noon General Barrera ordered the GTIA 3 and asked the Chadians to speed up the march so as not to leave the GTIA 4 isolated. In the west, GTIA 3 manages to cross the mined lock at the cost of one of its VABs, which is damaged by the explosion of a mine. The jihadists then begin to retreat, the leaders order their men to exfiltrate south to the Terz Valley and Tahor Pass. On the night of March 1 to 2, around 2 am, five pickups were spotted near Tahor. The Atlantic-2 cameras do not identify any hostages, the convoy is then rolled up by three Airburst bombs and twenty shells fired by the Caesar. After this carnage, the jihadist leaders ask their men to retreat on the back of dromedaries. On the evening of March 1, General Barrera goes to the GTIA 4 in the Amettetai, he then goes Tessalit aboard his Puma helicopter with the only prisoner made during the day, a Franco-Algerian jihadist named Djamel Ben Hamdi and nicknamed "Djamel the Grenoblois" The next day, around 8 o'clock in the morning, the 2nd company of the 2nd REP attacks two mounds north of the valley, while the 3rd company attacks a rocky peak in the south, near the "camp of the sands" and the "camp of rocks ", in the wadi that connects the valley of Amettetaï to the valley of Integant. The north position is taken around 10 o'clock, and the southern position around 11 o'clock. On each of the two points, the assault gives rise to very close combats which end in caves. About twenty jihadists die into these two clashes. Further east, the 140 men of the 1st RCP attack around 9 am an ultimate rock lock held by a dozen fighters. The French are first targeted by snipers, the hunters replicate and some of them perform a bypass movement on the right. The air force and the Tigers intervene but without success, the thickness of the rocks protects the defenders from the bombs. Around 11 am, the hunters storm, but the jihadists repel them twice. Soldiers hurt themselves by spraining the rocks. Around 18 hours, a third assault fails and a French soldier is shot in the head. The shelling then resumes again. During the seven hours of the fighting, the piton is struck by six Milan missiles fired at AT4, two GBUs and six HOTs fired by two Gazelle helicopters and two Tigers who also empty their ammunition, but at nightfall the jihadists still hold the position. According to the French staff, the day's record is of more than fifteen "neutralized" Islamists, three destroyed pick-ups and three important caches of ammunition, equipment and several heavy weapons seized. A Chadian soldier is also killed. The next day at dawn, the 1st RCP is relieved by 25 men of the 2nd REP and elements of the 17th RGP . The hunters bypass the position and head east. The legionaries on their side launch the ultimate assault. They take the peak and kill the only jihadist they find, hidden in a cave. Nevertheless, traces of blood, clothing and ten Korans found on the spot suggest that other fighters have managed to escape, perhaps later dead or injured. On the morning of March 3, the 2nd company of the 2nd REP goes down from the northern heights and takes control of the small village of Ametettai. For its part the GTIA 3 destroys a pickup and captures a BM-21. Chadians are also advancing, but complain about four injuries due to FDI. Shortly after the three columns make their junction near the village. A group of jihadists open fire on the crowd at 300 meters but the French and Chadians immediately retaliate and kill four men. Some clashes still occur, especially near water points, but at the end of the day, the Ametettai Valley is considered taken. In the words of General Barrera : "the dungeon has fallen". The columns then restart. The Chadians go west to cross the valley to refuel, then join their bivouac in Aguel'hoc. For its part, the GTIA 3 turned around to go to search the area of the "Garage", there is no resistance but discovered a lot of weapons and equipment. Further south, towards the Terz Valley, a group of 14 insurgents on the run is spotted by the air force despite its attempt to conceal the vegetation. The group is annihilated by an air strike. On March 4, some jihadists went to the French in the Ametettai Valley and the Garage. Among them are three child soldiers and a Nigerian who admitted to being Boko Haram fighters. From February 28 to March 4, according to the French General Staff, a dozen pick-ups and a 122- mm gun were destroyed and a lot of equipment and ammunition captured; including a BM-21, three other 122mm guns, a towable 100mm gun, an 82mm mortar and a 60mm mortar, weapons, rockets and anti-personnel mines. In addition to a soldier killed on March 2, the French army has two casualty wounded in combat.

=== Capturing the Sands, Rocks camp ===
After the capture of the Ametettai valley, the fighting decreased in intensity, the French and Chadians continued the excavations in the Adrar Tigharghar and punctually encountering a few scattered small groups. As of March 5, loudspeakers mounted on helicopters flying over the valleys of the Ametettaï and Terz, called in Arabic and Tamashek the last defenders to surrender. On March 6, the 3 e company 2 e REP continued south to the "Rock camp". They meet a small group of four jihadists who are all killed after two hours of fighting and whose last man is shot to less than one meter. Already visited twice in February, the "camp of rocks" is again searched by the special forces the night of March 4 to 5, and that of 6 to 7. They remain there even the next day before retiring. Then, on the morning of March 8, 200 paratroopers took control. The resistance is weaker than expected, a French lieutenant is wounded, and six jihadists are killed. Corpses of fighters probably killed by mortar fire a few days earlier are also discovered. For its part, the GTIA 3 goes down the valley of Integant and advances towards the "camp of the sands". Along the way, three jihadists are targeted by the firing of a tank. Two are killed, the third, wounded, traps the bodies of his comrades with grenades before being surprised again and shot not far away. The sands camp is taken without the French suffering any casualty. The Panthère III operation ends then and on the evening of March 8 the GTIA 4 starts to be repatriated on Tessalit in vehicles or helicopters. This movement lasts until the morning of March 10. On March 7, Defense Minister Jean-Yves Le Drian visits the French troops in Tessalit and in the Amettetai Valley. According to a statement from the Defense Ministry, he addresses the troops "a message of pride and encouragement for the mission they perform against terrorist groups that had made the massive Ifoghas their sanctuary". On that date, the French seized 1,000 rockets and grenades, 60,000 ammunition, and 1,500 shells and equipment for making homemade explosives.

=== Operations in the Terz Valley of March 15 to 21 ===
After taking the Ametettaï Valley, the French army and Chadians planned a new operation in another valley, that of Terz further south. The operation for the valley of Terz is named Panther VI by the French. The maneuver is close to Panther III; GTIA 3 is to enter the valley from the west, GTIA 4 to the north by Tahor Pass to the north and Chadians to the east to close the lock. However, the climatic conditions and the nature of the terrain put the vehicles and equipment of the Chadian forces under severe strain. Many armored vehicles have broken down, half of the AMX-10 RC can no longer ride and 200 infantrymen have no more shoes. For three days, the mechanics repaired the two tank squadrons, sometimes "cannibalizing" other vehicles, while new pairs of shoes were collected and returned to French soldiers for two days. On March 11, Chadians leave Aguel'hoc accompanied by French mortar gunners. They bypass the Adrar Tigharghar from the south and recognize the Assamalmal Valley. A battle occurs around 15 hours after. In a statement, the Chadian staff says that they had dead and wounded and have six dead and five prisoners among jihadists. However, General Barrera does not mention in his war notes of killed on both sides during this conflict. Later, he even said that Chadian soldiers would have encountered a lone fighter. On the 13th, two Chadians wounded by bullets are evacuated by a Puma. On the 15th, the GTIA 3 and 4 of the French army leave Tessalit while the Chadians leave the valley of Assamalmal, to take position east of the valley of Terz. The next day, the French enter the valley. The paratroopers do not encounter any resistance on the heights of Tahor, some empty pickups are bombarded by the air force and quickly the soldiers discover arms depots and food in shooting positions. The armor of the GTIA 4 is first preceded by sappers, but the column is late and must accelerate. Around 16 pm, a tank AMX 10 RC the 1 st RIMa hit a mine, three crew members were seriously burned and the driver is killed. The next day the GTIA 3 gives up passing through the west entrance, considered too narrow and too risky, it bypasses the north to take the path taken by the GTIA 4, now secure. But while the French and Chadians expected to find strong resistance, it turns out that Terz was recently abandoned by jihadists. The valley is searched, a pickup containing a large stock of ammunition and shells is destroyed by the engineers. A 14.5 mm machine gun, an anti-tank gun SPG-9, mortars and a missile 107 107 type firing station are also found in a cache. On March 20, the French and Chadian make their junction and Operation Panther VI ends the next day.

=== Operations in Adrar Tigharghar, from March 21 to 31 ===
On March 21, the French and Chadian forces moved south of the Adrar Tigharghar to the area known as "Jason", where there is an oasis called the "Garden", caves and the circus of Assamalmal - or Tigharghar - a natural amphitheater of 15 km in diameter in the middle of which is a mineral desert. On March 23, GCPare dropped at night by helicopter near the Garden, but the area turned out to be empty. The Chadians approached the circus but they did not find any passage that would allow vehicles to access the interior, the staff deduced that no material could be conveyed by the jihadists. There is nothing either on the side of the parachute dragons who search the Adrar Dourit from March 23 to 30. On March 23, the Chadians return to Aguel'hoc and the GTIA 4 does the same to Tessalit. The GTIA 3 returns in turn on March 25. From 21 to 25 March, 122 and 120 mm shells, four boxes of PG9 rockets, 60 mm mortarsand some mines were seized. On March 26, a company of the 2ond REP and another from the 1st RCP leads Operation Tigris in the town of Tessalit to search the city and to ensure the absence of any jihadi presence. There are no arrests or seized material. On the 27th, GTIA 3 comes out again from Tessalit. One of its subgroups led the operation Panthère VIII, that went to recognize the valley of Assamalmal south of Adrar Tigharghar, then again the "Garden". A printing press is discovered during the excavations, as well as some stocks of weapons. The other sub-group, commanded by Colonel Gougeon, is leading the Renard operation with the Chadians. He go to Boghassa, then Abeibara. In the latter city, a Togolese jihadist is arrested. Generals Barrera and Bikimoand Colonel Gougeon then meet the notables and residents indicate the location of depots of weapons, medical equipment and ammunition. These transactions end on March 31. The Adrar Tigharghar is now considered empty and French troops begin to be disengaged. GTIA 3 returns to Kidal and on April 2 it is in Gao. In early April the GTIA can repatriate and two of its SGTIA Abidjan, return to France after ten days in the Ivorian capital. On 5 April, Chadian forces return to Kidal. On 9 April, the French garrison of Tessalit rose in ten days from 2.000 to 400 men. In May, all the GTIAs engaged in Operation Serval were relieved and returned to France after a stopover in Paphos, on the island of Cyprus, to decompress at the request of General Barrera. Chadians, on the other hand, remain deployed much longer in the Kidal region; in September 160 soldiers of the Tessalit garrison desert the Amachach military camp after having complained of not having been relieved after nine months of mission in the great north of Mali.

== Aftermath ==
The Battle of Ifoghas completes the reconquest phase of northern Mali. After this defeat, the jihadists sought to blend in with the population and avoided clashes. In Terz Valley, even the French were discovering the cut beards the jihadists left. Salafist rebels now had gone underground. The jihadists left hundreds of dead in the first months of Operation Serval, and according to General Barrera, after their defeat in the Tigharghâr;"They are no longer able to occupy the field, nor numerous enough to fight a classic battle. It only remains small terrorist groups conducting asymmetric warfare and avoid contact ". The jihadists then change their tactics and go to guerrilla warfare; they carry out suicide attacks, ambush, fire rockets at military barracks, lay mines and IEDs on the roads, and kill supporters of the Malian government or the Tuareg rebellion. On 25 April, AQIM calls for jihad against France in a speech delivered by Abu Obeida Youssef al-Annabi. Iyad Ag Ghali reappears in turn on July 29, 2014 in a video and affirms his will to continue to fight the "crusaders, with France in the lead". On April 16, a pickup group spotted northwest of Tessalit was destroyed by French aviation. Several jihadists were killed but Senda Ould Boumama, spokesman of Ansar Dine, escaped the strikes when he was directly targeted. Traumatized by the bombing, he traveled several tens of kilometers in the desert to go to Algerians Bordj Badji Mokhtar.
