= Abdelkrim al-Targui =

Malian jihadist

- Born: Hamada Ag Hama c. 1970; Kidal, Mali
- Died: May 18, 2015 Tigharghar mountains, Kidal Region, Mali
- Allegiance: AQIM (2010-2015)
- Branch: Katiba Al Ansar
- Rank: Emir (Katiba Al Ansar)
- Known for: Kidnapping of several French nationals
- Conflicts: Insurgency in the Sahel; Mali War: Battle of Tinzaouaten (2010); Battle of Ifoghas

Hamada Ag Hama, also known as Abdelkrim Taleb or Abdelkrim al-Targui, was a Malian jihadist and emir of Katiba Al Ansar, a brigade in Al-Qaeda in the Islamic Maghreb (AQIM).

== Biography ==
Targui was born in Kidal, and is a cousin of Iyad Ag Ghaly. In the 1990s, he joined the Dawa, an Islamist sect, and got in contact with the Salafist Group for Preaching and Combat (GSPC) a few years later. He joined Al-Qaeda in the Islamic Maghreb (AQIM) in 2010. In AQIM, he was initially under the orders of Abou Zeid, but as increased numbers of Tuareg fighters joined AQIM and did not want to be commanded by an Algerian, Targui became the leader of the newly created Katiba Al Ansar.

On June 30, 2010, Targui ambushed a convoy of Algerian soldiers at Tinzaouaten near the Malian border. Eleven gendarmes were killed in the attack, and a customs officer was captured and executed. Captured Tunisian AQIM militant Bechir Bessoun testified that Michel Germaneau, a French hostage, was personally executed by Targui in the Tigharghar mountains of Adrar des Ifoghas. The execution of Germaneau was carried out under the orders of Djamel Okacha and Zeid in retaliation for a Franco-Mauritanian ambush on AQIM in the raid on Akla.

Philippe Verdon and Serge Lazarevic were kidnapped by Targui's Katiba Al Ansar on November 24, 2011. In March 2013, Verdon was executed by Targui, and his body was found that July. MNLA fighters stated his body was found in Adrar Tigharghar following the battle of Tigharghar. Targui's associate Sedane Ag Hita kidnapped Ghislaine Dupont and Claude Verlon on November 2, 2013, and were executed by Katiba Al Ansar shortly afterward. Lazarevic was released by AQIM in 2014 in exchange for two relatives of Targui captured by French forces; Haiba Ag Acherif and Mohamed Ali Ag Wadoussene.

Targui was located near Boghassa by French intelligence in 2015. On May 16, 2015, he left a meeting where ten jihadists were gathered and traveled with Ibrahim Ag Inawalen and two bodyguards. Their vehicle was ambushed by French forces on the night between May 17 and 18, and were all killed in a shootout with French forces in the Tigharghar mountains.
