= Battle of Elakla =

2019 battle of the Mali War

- Part of Mali War
Date	21 February 2019
Location	Near Elakla, Mali
Result	French victory

Belligerents
France	Jama'at Nasr al-Islam wal Muslimin

Commanders and leaders
Unknown	Djamel Okacha †; Seifallah Ben Hassine †

Casualties and losses
None	11 killed Several prisoners

The battle of Elakla took place on 21 February 2019, between French forces of Operation Barkhane and al-Qaeda aligned Jama'at Nasr al-Islam wal Muslimin.

== Prelude ==
After the creation of Jama'at Nasr al-Islam wal Muslimin in 2017, a jihadist group that was the result of five Sahelian jihadist groups merging, French forces in Operation Barkhane aided the Malian government's efforts to fight the group. Djamel Okacha was a founding member of JNIM and the group's second-in-command.

== Battle ==
Barkhane forces launched an operation on the afternoon of 21 February after spotting three vehicles deemed suspicious moving throughout Tombouctou Region. The French army launched drone strikes on the vehicles, before sending in ground forces, five helicopters, and an MQ-9 drone. The aircraft took off at 1:13pm from Bou Djeheba, north of Timbuktu. An hour later, one pick-up was spotted by the drones, before being joined by two more vehicles. After a chase, two pick-ups stopped and surrendered after being shot at. The ground forces chased the third truck, but were only able to catch it after a second group of commandos intervened as it tried to blend into civilians. As the drivers felt trapped, they got out and shot at the French commandos, but were killed.

== Aftermath ==
The French government claimed 11 fighters were put out of action, including Djamel Okacha and his two main deputies. Seifallah Ben Hassine, nom de guerre Abou Iyadh and leader of the Tunisian jihadist group Ansar al-Sharia, was also killed in the battle. Okacha's death was confirmed by Sedane Ag Hita, another top member of JNIM, and later JNIM leader and founder Abdelmalek Droukdel.
