= Lemine Ould Mohamed Salem =

Director and filmmaker

- Born: 1968 (age 57–58); Moudjeria, Mauritania
- Notable work: Salafistes; Le Bin Laden du Sahara: Sur les traces du Mokhtar Belmokhar; L'histoire secrète du djihad; d'al-Qaida à l'Etat islamique

Lemine Ould Mohamed Salem is a Mauritanian journalist, director, and author who embedded himself with jihadists from Al-Qaeda in the Islamic Maghreb (AQIM) in 2012.

== Biography ==
Salem was born in 1968 in Moudjeria, Mauritania. He has degrees in public law, political science, and international relations. He first worked as a journalist for Al Bayane, and then as a correspondent in Paris for the French service of the BBC and as a contributor to Libération, L'Humanité, and Radio Suisse Romande. In 2007, Salem released a report revealing the presence of a CIA black site in Oualata, Mauritania.

At the outbreak of the Mali War in 2012, Salem obtained authorization from jihadist leadership to travel to Gao and Timbuktu, which were under control of Ansar Dine, AQIM, and MOJWA at the time. The images and videos he recorded during his time in the cities were used for the documentary Salafistes which he co-directed with Francois Margolin and released in 2016. Abderrahmane Sissako, a Mauritanian filmmaker initially associated with the project, withdrew from it in December 2012 and used Salem's images as inspiration for the fictional movie Timbuktu which was released in 2014.

In 2015, he worked as a correspondent for the Tribune de Genève, Le Soir, Le Temps, and Sud Ouest.

== Publications ==
In 2014, Salem released the book Le Bin Laden du Sahara: Sur les traces du jihadiste Mokhtar Belmokhtar (The Bin Laden of the Sahara: In the Footsteps of Mokhtar Belmokhtar) about his time embedded in AQIM.

In 2018, Salem published L'histoire Secrete du Djihad: D'al-Qaida a l'Etat Islamique (The Secret History of Jihad: From al-Qaeda to the Islamic State) about Mahfouz Ould al-Walid, a close companion of al-Qaeda emir Osama bin Laden.

== Filmography ==
- Salafistes – 2016

== Bibliography ==
- Le Bin Laden du Sahara: Sur les traces du jihadiste Mokhtar Belmokhtar - 2014
- L'histoire Secrete du Djihad: D'al-Qaida a l'Etat Islamique - 2018
