= Operation Panther (2013) =

French military operation in Mali

- Part of Northern Mali conflict and Operation Serval
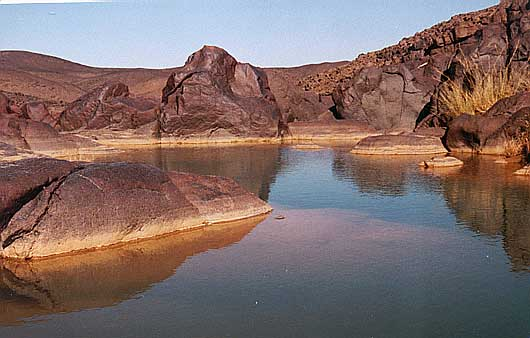
- Adrar des Ifoghas
| Date | 19 February – 25 March 2013 (1 month and 6 days) |
| Location | Adrar des Ifoghas, Mali |
| Result | French Victory |

Belligerents
| France; Chad | AQIM; Ansar Dine |

Commanders and leaders
| (France) Bernard Barrera (Chad) Mahamat Idriss Déby Itno | Abdelhamid Abou Zeid † |

Strength
| (France); 1,200 (Chad); 800 troops | 400–500 terrorists |

Casualties and losses
| (France); 3 killed 120 wounded 1 armoured vehicle destroyed (Chad); 27 killed 67–71 wounded | 200–250 killed 26+ captured 45 pick-ups destroyed 1 BM-21 captured 2 BRDM-2 destroyed |

Operation Panther was a French military operation in Mali that was launched in February 2013.

== Events ==
On 19 February 2013, heavy fighting occurred as French Special Forces pushed deeper into the Azawad hinterland in pursuit of Islamist insurgents. During the engagement one paratrooper from the French Foreign Legion and 20 Islamists were killed. French President François Hollande commented during a visit to Greece that one French soldier and many Islamists had been killed in the fighting.

Early in the afternoon on 20 February dozen Islamists were killed by French ground troops backed by Tiger helicopters. Near the Algerian border, a van carrying jihadists was destroyed by a Tiger helicopter and several of its occupants were killed. According to Colonel Thierry Burkhard "a little less than a dozen terrorists" were "neutralized" on 20 February. In addition, Burkhard said that ten targets were destroyed by air strikes from either planes or helicopters in the Adrar des Iforas and Bourem, destroying an armored vehicle and four pick-up. More weapons caches were discovered and several vehicles and rocket launchers were seized.

On 23 February, French air strike took place in the area of Sensa, destroying six jihadists vehicles. According to the MNLA and the citizens of the town of Kidal, 45 fighters from AQIM and Dine Ansar were killed during a French raid. By supporting the French special forces, the MNLA also allegedly took seven prisoners and among the survivors, including the head of AQIM, Seden Ag Hita.

The offensive continued in the Adrar Tigharghar where there are concentrated forces of AQIM . According to Ag Acherif Bilal, head of the MNLA, "There are many areas where AQIM are to the west of Timbuktu, but Tigharghar is their anchor. This is where you will find the bulk of their forces, both human and material. The current battle is of paramount importance. On 26 February, the French Minister of Defence, Jean-Yves Le Drian said that fighting had continued and that there were "many, many dead jihadists."

According to a notable informant at the Aguel'hoc passage of Kidal: "There are French and Chadian troops on the ground, but also many strikes by Tiger Helicopters." He noted that two training camps of the Mujao were hit by airstrikes and dozens of fighters from around Gao were killed. French air strikes continue to destroy shelters and camps and information is collected on the ground.

On Wednesday, 27 February, a LAV 3 GTIA hit a mine near Taghlit In Tessalit. Two French soldiers were wounded, one slightly, and could rejoin his unit the next day. The second was more severely affected, and was evacuated to France.

On 28 February, the French army claimed to have discovered a large weapons dump, thanks to the cooperation of the local population, which contained more than a dozen workshops and caches, four 82mm mortars, 70 122mm rockets, 9 50 kg bags of explosive, 3 bottles of improvised explosive and was captured by French troops. That morning, the Staff stated that the French units fighting in the region over the previous few days had killed about 130 Islamists.

=== March 2013 ===
On 1 March 2013, It was announced that the second-in-command for Al Qaeda in North Africa, Abdelhamid Abou Zeid, was killed during fighting between Islamists and French army units.

On 3 March, The Elysée Palace announced that a soldier of the First Parachute Chasseur Regiment was killed in clashes with extremists during the night of 2 March. The French Government announced that the soldier "was mortally wounded during fighting against armed terrorists taking refuge in the Adrar of the Ifoghas, in northern Mali." Colonel Thierry Burkhard told French Media that French paratroopers had been engaged with Terrorists throughout the day on several occasions.

15 Islamists were killed during the day by French Troops during raids in the Ametettai Valley, about fifty miles south of Tessalit, as French troops cleared mountain caves and galleries where Islamists have been hiding. Mr Hollande paid tribute to the soldier and other troops allied troops in Mali. "the courage and zeal of the French forces engaged in combat against armed terrorist groups to restore the full sovereignty of Mali, alongside Malian armed forces and African contingents ".

The fighting continued after 4 March, the French Air Force made 120 trips to the region Tessalit, and 40 air strikes against groups of combatants, combat outposts and artillery pieces. During this same period the French army claims to have "neutralized" forty rebels destroyed nearly a dozen pick-up and an artillery gun, and captured a lot of equipment and ammunition including BM-21, 122D30 3 guns, one 100mm towed gun, one 82mm mortar and one 60mm mortar, as well small-arms, RPGs and anti-personnel mines. Corporal Charenton was killed on 2 March, and the French army had two minor injuries in combat.

15 Islamists killed by the French during the night of 3 to 4 March. Considered terrorists by France, do not enjoy the status of prisoner of war by the Geneva Conventions. The captured terrorists will be presented to Malian authorities. One of the prisoners, a French national, was extradited to France. 4 March, the Valley of Ametettaï was conquered after three weeks of fighting. The area was circled to the east by Chadian and the French troops, and then captured.

From 4 to 7 March, the raids continued in the valley of Ametettaï, since the beginning of the operation the French General Staff believes have "neutralized" more than two hundred and jihadists and have seized a thousand rockets or grenades, more than 60,000 rounds of ammunition, nearly 1,500 shells and twenty heavy weapons such as artillery guns. On 7 March, the French troops in the valley of Amettetai receive a visit from French Defence Minister Jean-Yves Le Drian.

From 7 to 11 March, in the region of the Adrar des Ifoghas, troops complete their operations of excavation of caves in looking for insurgents. Stocks of weapons and ammunition that are found are either destroyed or seized and brought to Tessalit by French troops. The Islamists retreated and abandoned their positions in the valley of Ametettaï further south. A dozen of the Islamists are killed. Meanwhile, an armored squadron of AMX-10 RC supported by fighters, took part in a reconnaissance mission, northeast of Ifoghas and take over the villages of Boghassa and Tinzawatène . On the way an AMX-10 RC is damaged by mine but the French suffer no casualties.

On the morning of 12 March, soldiers from the 2nd Foreign Legion Parachute Regiment engaged a group of Islamist fighters. Four of the Islamists were killed, and another was taken prisoner. The French had no losses.

On the night of 15 to 16 March 2013, elements of French GTIA 4 and TAP GTIA begin a search and destroy mission in the southern parts of the Ametéttaï Valley, about sixty miles south of Tessalit . In the afternoon of 16 March, an AMX-10 RC hit a mine, three French soldiers were injured, two seriously. The driver of the armored vehicle, Corporal Alexander Van Dooren, was killed. The wounded were evacuated by medical helicopter to a field hospital in Tessalit.

Between 18 and 21 March, French troops continued search and destroy missions in the Terz Valley, south of the Amettetai valley. The Chadian forces, commanded by General Deby, are positioned themselves to block out the escape routes and prevent the arrival of reinforcements from the region of Kidal. 20 March, Chadian and French GTIA 3 perform their junction. During the operation, a truck containing a large stock of ammunition and shells is destroyed by EOD. A 14.5 mm machine gun, an anti-tank gun SPG-9, mortars and missile firing station 107 type 85 are also found in a cache. From 21 to 25 March, the French army finished its offensive operations and faced no opposition.

GTIA TAP returned to Tessalit while GTIA 3 is focused on Eastern Adrar to continue their searches. Shells 122 and 120 mm PG9, four crates of rockets, mortars 60 mm and some mines are seized. Thereafter, the operation led to troops moving into Tessalit to search the city and to ensure the absence of any presence jihadiste. No insurgent were discovered and GTIA then could redeploy two of its SGTIA, who returned Abidjan. During these missions new ammunition caches were discovered but no jihadist group is located. The troops then returned to Kidal, then they were redeployed Gao. April 5, Chadian forces return to turn the city of Kidal

== See also ==
- Battle of Ifoghas, fighting in the Adrar des Ifoghas rock massif during Operation Panther
