= Jouleibib =

Islamic terrorists and jihadist (1981-2013)

- Jouleibib, as seen in an undated photograph
- Born: 1981; Tidjikdja, Mauritania
- Died: 13 November 2013 (aged 31–32); Rural Tessalit Cercle, Kidal Region, Mali
- Cause of death: Gunshot wound
- Organizations: (al-Qaeda) GSPC (2003/2005-2007); (Islamic State) AQMI (2007-2012); (al-Qaeda) Signatories by Blood (2007-2012); (Islamic State) Al-Mourabitoun (2013)
- Known for: Agadez and Arlit attacks

El-Hassen Ould Khalil Jouleibib (1981–2013) was a Mauritanian jihadist and lieutenant of Mokhtar Belmokhtar. Jouleibib fought in the Salafist Group for Preaching and Combat and later Al-Qaeda in the Islamic Maghreb. He was born in 1981 in Tidjikdja and died on 13 November 2013 in Tessalit Cercle, Mali.

== Life ==
=== Early life and education ===
Khalill was born in Tidjikdja, Mauritania, into a family of literate traders. He received technological training in Nouakchott and theological training in a Koranic school in the Tidjikdja area. In the early 2000s, he broke away from his belief in Sufism and converted to jihadist Salafism.

He first tried to reach Iraq to fight American troops, but he met Mokhtar Belmokhtar with whom he became friends. He joined the Katiba de les Enturbannés and in 2005 took part in the Lemgheity attack against the Mauritanian Army.

Canadian diplomat Robert Fowler, who was held hostage by jihadists from December 2008 to April 2009, frequently met Jouleibib to whom he gave periodic English lessons. He said about him: “He was a serious student, blessed with a remarkable memory and a good ear. [...] Even though he was usually smiling and very relaxed, I could see in Jouleybib's eyes that he was still our enemy. Technically, he was the most sophisticated of our kidnappers (keeping up to date with reactions to our kidnapping in Canada), and along with Jack and Hassan, among the most dangerous”.

On May 24, 2013, Jouleibib claimed responsibility for the attacks in Agadez and Arlit.

=== Death ===
On the night of November 13 to 14, 2013, Jouleibib was spotted by the French military in Operation Barkhane of the Mali War because of Jouleibib's phone. Jouleibib was killed alongside two other jihadists in their truck in rural Tessalit Cercle.
