= April 2013 Kidal attack =

Terrorist attack in Mali

Kidal suicide attack
- Part of the Northern Mali conflict
- Location: 18°26′15″N 1°24′30″E; Kidal, Mali
- Date: 12 April 2013; 9:50 (UTC)
- Target: Chadian soldiers
- Attack type: Suicide attack
- Weapon: Explosive belt
- Deaths: 4 soldiers, suicide bomber
- Injuries: 3 soldiers, 5 civilians
- Perpetrator: Movement for Oneness and Jihad in West Africa

On 12 April 2013, four Chadian soldiers were killed, and five civilians were injured, in an attack by two suicide bombers affiliated with the MOJWA in Kidal, Mali.

== Background ==
In early February 2013, Chadian and French troops occupied Kidal, using it as a key military base to house their troops and to renew counter-attacks on jihadists rebels in the Adrar des Ifoghas, situated just north of the city. The city has been targeted on several occasions since then. On 5 April, after the French-led Operation Panther had ended, the Chadian army left the Adrar des Ifoghas mountains after weeks of battling Islamists to return their main base located on the outskirts of Kidal, bringing the number of troops there to 1,800.

== Attack ==
On Friday morning 12 April 2013, a group of Chadian soldiers stationed in Kidal went to the local market to buy supplies. At around 9:50 am, according to eyewitnesses, once the group made its debut a suicide bomber detonated his explosive belts in a nearby market stall, while Chadian soldiers were passing by, killing three soldiers instantly and severely wounding four more in the explosion. According to residents, the incident occurred on a street commonly frequented by Chadian soldiers, located about 100 meters from the town market itself. According to witness accounts, the first bomber was said to have been neutralized before he could explode his belt, but the second one succeeded, letting off a deadly blast that destroyed part of the market and also injured five bystanders. However, Chadian and MNLA authorities claim only one suicide bomber took part in the attack itself. Immediately following the explosion, Chadian soldiers fired automatic weapons in the air, in an attempt to disperse the crowd from reaching the scene of the blast. According to Kidal's deputy mayor Abda Ag Kazina, the four soldiers were in a state of critical condition. The expected death toll was likely to rise. Following the explosion, army checkpoints were placed at the four main entrances to Kidal, in fear that more suicide bombers can infiltrate the city, as easily as they did that morning. The same day, a Chadian security source issued a statement indicating that MOJWA (The Movement of Oneness and Jihadism in West Africa) was responsible for the suicide attack. According to inhabitants of the city, after the suicide bombing occurred, Chadian soldiers succumbed to fear and turned their weapons against civilians, firing live rounds of ammunition that injured five bystanders. A fourth Chadian soldier who was injured in the attack died overnight at a hospital in Gao. The three other wounded soldiers were evacuated to a military hospital Bamako, where from their military officials claim that they were in no life-threatening condition.

The same day, a suspect in the name of Sidi Amar Ould Algor, ranked a colonel in the MNLA, was arrested by Chadian soldiers in connection to the earlier bombings, where he admitted he was the owner of the car that drove the future-suicide bomber to the Kidal market, where moments later he blew himself up. Tensions were raised following his arrest, as the MNLA never granted the Chadian army permission to take custody of one of its fighters.

== Aftermath ==
Earlier on the same day as the suicide attack, a Chadian Air Force helicopter (probably a Mil Mi-17 Hip-H) crashed around 50 km northeast of the Malian town of Sevare, killing all five occupants, including a senior military officer.

Two days after the attack, Chadian president Idriss Deby announced Chad would withdraw its troops, citing the jihadists' guerrilla tactics.
