= Touati =

Touati is a surname and given name. Notable people with the name include:

== Surname ==
- Assia Touati (born 1995), French swimmer
- Elisa Tovati (born Elisa Touati in 1976), French singer
- Fettouma Touati (born 1950), Algerian-French novelist
- Hussayn Touati (born 2001), French footballer
- Jaleleddine Touati (born 1982), Tunisian handball player
- Kamel Touati (born 1958), Tunisian actor
- Karim Touati (born 1985), Tunisian footballer
- Larbi Touati (born 1936), Tunisian footballer
- Meziane Touati (born 1969), Algerian footballer
- Mohamed Touati (born 1939), Tunisian cyclist
- Mohamed Amine Touati (born 1998), Tunisian athlete
- Sonia Touati (born 1973), Tunisian table tennis player
- Tahar Touati, Algerian diplomat
- Youcef Touati (1989–2017), Algerian footballer

== Given name ==
- Touati Benoukraf (born 1980), computational and molecular biologist
