= Sedane Ag Hita =

Malian jihadist and second-in-command of Jama'at Nasr al-Islam wal-Muslimin

- Nickname: Abou Abdelhakim al-Kidali
- Born: Kidal, Mali
- Allegiance: FAMa (until 2006); ADC (2006); AQIM (2010–2017); JNIM (2017–present)
- Branch: Katiba Al Ansar (2010–2012); Katiba Youssef ibn Tachfin (2012–present)
- Rank: Sergeant-major (FAMa); Emir of Katiba Youssef ibn Tachfin (2012–2017); Second-in-command of JNIM (2019–present)
- Conflicts: Mali War: Battle of Ifoghas; Battle of Tinzaouaten (2024)

Sedane Ag Hita, also known as Abou Abdelhakim al-Kidali, (Note: Other names known for Hita are Asidan Ag Hitta, Abu 'Abd al-Hakim, Abu Qarwani, Abu Qairawani, and Sidane Ag Hitta or Sedane Ag Hitta.) is a Malian jihadist who is currently serving as the second-in-command of Jama'at Nasr al-Islam wal-Muslimin since March 11, 2019.

== Biography ==
=== Early life and AQIM years ===
Hita was born in Kidal, Mali and joined the Malian National Guard where he received the rank of sergeant-major. Hita deserted the Malian army in 2006 at the onset of the 2006 Tuareg rebellion, and joined Al-Qaeda in the Islamic Maghreb (AQIM) in the early 2010s. He joined Katiba Al Ansar led by Abdelkrim al-Targui, and was active as a fighter in Kidal Region. Around this time, Hita took the kunya of Abou Abdel Hamid al-Kidali or al-Qairawani. In November or December 2012, the Youssef Ibn Tachfin katiba was founded by AQIM, and Hita was put in charge of it. The brigade was composed mostly of Tuaregs, and was active in Kidal Region and particularly in the Adrar des Ifoghas.

In February 2013, Hita escaped French bombardment during the Battle of Ifoghas. He took refuge near Aguelhok and announced that he had defected from AQIM. Hita attempted to contact the National Movement for the Liberation of Azawad (MNLA) and testified about the death of AQIM emir Abdelhamid Abou Zeid. In November 2013, Hita was directly linked to the kidnapping and murder of journalists Ghislaine Dupont and Claude Verlon on November 2. Hita reportedly helped kidnap them to obtain the release of his nephews. His nephews were released in December 2014 in exchange for journalist Serge Lazarevic, but one of them was killed in 2015 and the other in 2017.

=== JNIM and second-in-command ===
At the founding of Jama'at Nasr al-Islam wal-Muslimin (JNIM), an al-Qaeda affiliated coalition that brought together five jihadist groups, Hita was announced as a top leader in the group. Hita's sister, Assi Wallet Hita, was known to divert aid from NGOs in the Kidal Region to JNIM. Hita's first rise to public prominence in JNIM was when he masterminded the 2019 Aguelhok attack that killed 10 MINUSMA peacekeepers. After the death of Djamel Okacha in 2019, the second-in-command of JNIM, Hita was appointed as JNIM's second-in-command. Hita's promotion was announced in a voice message through WhatsApp in March 2019. In the voice message, Hita accused an Algerian official in Tamanrasset of being "an agent of France" and threatened him.

In 2020, Hita led negotiations with the Malian and French governments on behalf of JNIM. These negotiations eventually led to the release of 200 jihadists including some perpetrators of the 2015 Bamako hotel attack and the 2016 Ouagadougou attacks, and the release of Sophie Pétronin and Soumaïla Cissé. Hita later was reported to be the mastermind for the negotiations that led to Cisse's release. In 2023, Jeune Afrique reported that Hita is the main leader of JNIM's hostage operations, and occasionally visits hostages. While Abderrahmane Talha is considered to be the head of hostage locations, detentions, and contact schedules, Hita decides whether the hostages live or die.

In July 2024, Hita commanded an ambush on Wagner Group and Malian forces in Tinzaouaten, Mali alongside emir of Tinzaouaten Abderahmane Zaza. JNIM claimed responsibility for the attack alongside the CSP-PSD.

In 2019, the United States sanctioned Hita as an SDGT for his role in JNIM. The European Union sanctioned him on June 20, 2022.
