= El Ghallaouiya ambush =

2007 attack on Mauritanian soldiers by Al-Qaeda in the Islamic Maghreb

- Part of the Insurgency in the Maghreb (2002–present)
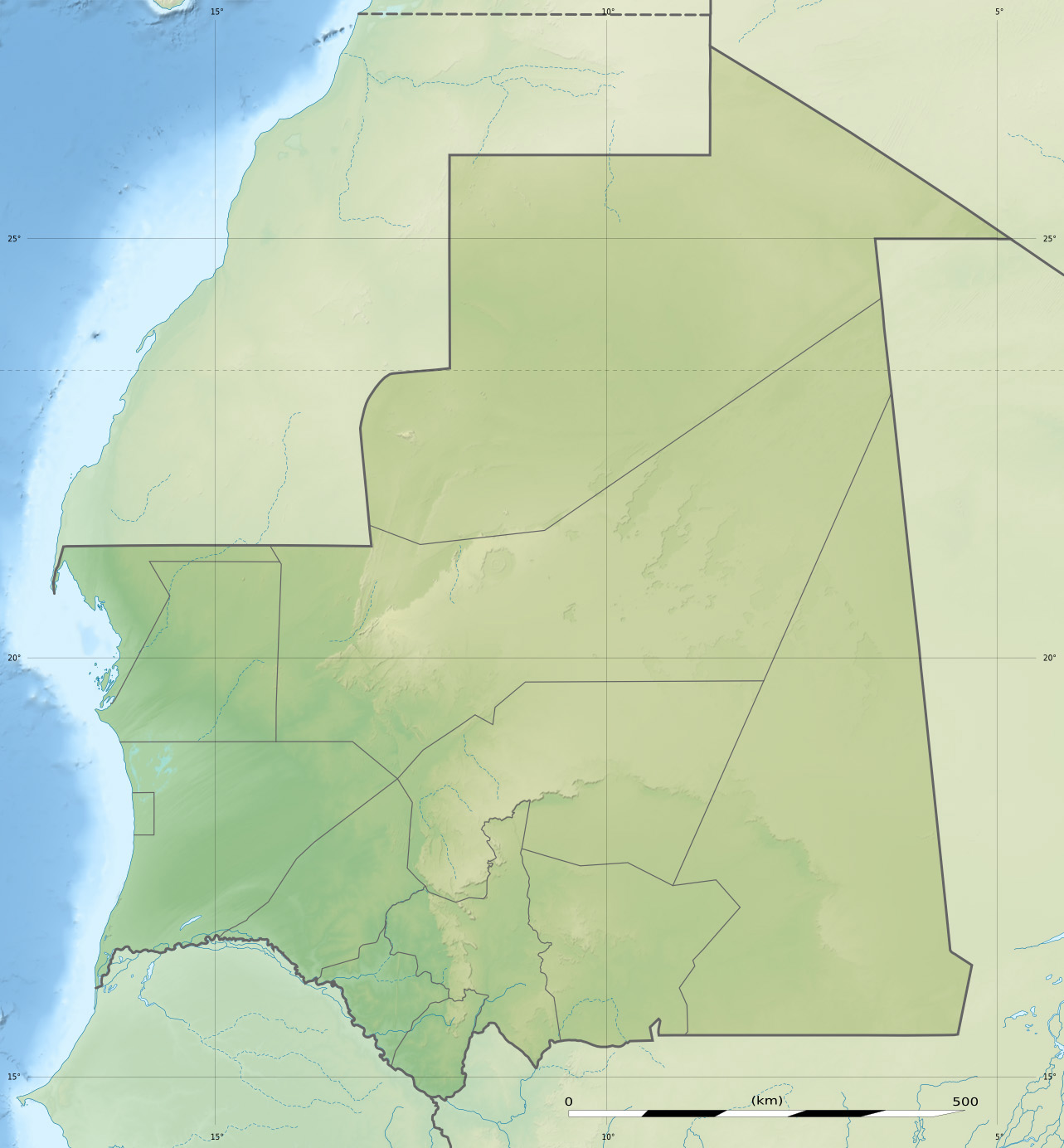
- Ambush location (Mauritania)
Date	December 27, 2007; 18 years ago
Location	El Ghallaouiya Fort, near Ouadane, Adrar, Mauritania 21°35′36.77″N 10°36′6.57″W
Result	AQIM victory

Belligerents
Mauritania	AQIM

Commanders and leaders
Unknown	Djamel Okacha

Casualties and losses
3 killed	Unknown

On 27 December 2007, militants affiliated with al-Qaeda in the Islamic Maghreb (AQIM) ambushed a Mauritanian Army patrol near el Ghallaouiya Fort, a former French military post near Ouadane in the Adrar region of northern Mauritania.

== Background ==
Militant activity in Mauritania intensified in the mid-2000s as the Algerian-based Salafist Group for Preaching and Combat (GSPC), which rebranded as al-Qaeda in the Islamic Maghreb (AQIM) in 2007, expanded operations into the Sahel. The group had already carried out a major attack on a Mauritanian military base in 2005, marking the beginning of a sustained insurgency in the country's remote northern regions. The situation further deteriorated in late December 2007 following the killing of French tourists near Aleg, highlighting a sharp escalation in jihadist activity in the days preceding the ambush near el Ghallaouiya.

== Ambush ==
A Mauritanian Army patrol attempted to intercept two suspicious vehicles in the remote desert near el Ghallaouiya Fort. The vehicles opened fire, triggering a brief clash that resulted in the deaths of three Mauritanian troops. The attackers subsequently seized weapons from the scene before disengaging and leaving the area. The ambush was reportedly planned and executed by Djamel Okacha, who later became a senior AQIM commander in the Sahel.

== Aftermath ==
Following the ambush, AQIM issued threats against the Dakar Rally, contributing to heightened security concerns in the region. In response to these risks, organizers cancelled the 2008 Dakar Rally, which had been scheduled to run through Mauritania and surrounding areas.
