= Agadez and Arlit attacks =

Attacks by Islamists in Niger, 2013

Coordinates: 16.9667°N 7.9833°E

- Part of the spillover of the Mali War
- Location: Agadez and Arlit, Niger
- Date: 23 May 2013
- Target: A Niger Army base in Agadez; A French operated uranium mine in Arlit.
- Attack type: Terrorist attack
- Deaths: 36
- Injuries: ~ 30
- Perpetrator: MUJAO: Signatories in Blood

On 23 May 2013, two coordinated attacks perpetrated by Islamist affiliates targeted the two Niger towns of Agadez and Arlit, the first being a military base the other a French-owned and operated uranium mine. In the first attack on the Niger military base, in which eight attackers participated, 23 soldiers and a civilian were confirmed dead by the next day. The second attack by two suicide bombers also claimed a worker at the mine. The Movement for Oneness and Jihad in West Africa (MUJAO) later claimed responsibility, saying "We attacked Niger for its cooperation with France in the war against Sharia (Islamic law)". They also promised more attacks to come in retaliation for Niger's involvement in the Northern Mali conflict. Reports suggested Islamist leader Mokhtar Belmokhtar of being the "mastermind" of both attacks, supervised by his brigade the "Signatories of Blood". These were the first such attacks within the country in Niger's history.

== Agadez attack ==
At 5:30 local time during morning prayers, the first of the two suicide attacks hit Agadez, a city situated in northern Niger, when a group of eight extremists attacked the local army barracks. A suicide car bomber en route to the barracks drove through the base's barricades and exploded inside the barracks, killing several soldiers. This car bomb was then followed by a twin vehicle that entered the base while opening fire on soldiers. A lengthy gun battle followed as Islamists took hold of the barracks dormitory and an office. In a matter of hours the fight spread throughout the base and into the streets where a civilian was killed in the cross-fire. By late afternoon, extremist elements took refuge in the barracks' dormitory, taking five soldiers hostage. The hostage-takers threatened to blow themselves up with explosives but negotiated with the army. By the next morning, three of the hostages had been killed before Niger troops, with help from French special forces based in Mali, raided the building, killing two of the extremists and capturing one. The two surviving hostages were freed. According to the Niger army, 23 soldiers were killed in the Agadez base attack, plus a foreign-training Cameroonian soldier. In addition, all eight of the attackers were confirmed killed. Rumors spread about a ninth attacker being taken alive.

== Arlit attack ==
A few minutes following the Agadez attack, two suicide bombers disguised in military fatigues drove their car into an Areva uranium mine in Arlit, the largest such mine in the country, operated by a French company. The car exploded in front of a pick-up bus carrying workers to the facility. Besides the two suicide bombers, one worker was killed and sixteen others were injured. The plant was forced to shut down from the damage caused by the blast. The main target was said to be French officials operating at the plant.
