= Djamel Okacha =

Algerian jihadist

- Born: 5 September 1978; Reghaia, Algeria
- Died: 21 February 2019 (aged 40); Elakla, Tombouctou Region, Mali
- Military career
- Allegiance: GSPC (1997–2007); AQIM (2007–2019); JNIM (2017–2019)
- Rank: Emir of Katiba al-Mulathamoun (2000s); Emir of Katiba al-Furqan (2009–2019); Emir of the Sahara (2012–2017); Second-in-command of JNIM (2017–2019)
- Nickname: Yahia Abou al-Hamman
- Units: Katiba al-Mulathamoun (2003–2009); Katiba al-Furqan (2009–2019)
- Conflicts: Lemgheity attack In Amenas hostage crisis Fall of Timbuktu (2012); Battle of Ifoghas; Battle of Elakla †

Djamel Okacha, nom de guerre Yahia Abou al-Hamman, was an Algerian jihadist who fought in the Salafist Group for Preaching and Combat (GSPC) and later Al-Qaeda in the Islamic Maghreb (AQIM) and Jama'at Nasr al-Islam wal-Muslimin (JNIM). Okacha served as the commanders of Katiba al-Furqan and Katiba al-Mulathamoun within AQIM, and was appointed as the co-governor of Tombouctou Region during Ansar Dine's capture of the region during the 2012 Tuareg rebellion. Okacha was then appointed as the second-in-command of AQIM between 2012 and 2017, where he co-founded JNIM alongside Iyad Ag Ghaly and Amadou Kouffa. Okacha served as the second-in-command of JNIM until his death in 2019.

== Biography ==
Okacha was born on September 5, 1978, in Reghaïa, Algeria. He was close with either the Islamic Salvation Front or Armed Islamic Group as a teenager during the Algerian Civil War, which earned him an eighteen-month prison sentence in 1995. After Okacha's release, he befriended Abdelmalek Droukdel as the both of them grew up in Algiers. He joined the Salafist Group for Preaching and Combat (GSPC) at its creation in 1998. Within the group, he served as a sniper due to having a lame right foot. In the early 2000s, Okacha was appointed the commander of Zone 2, which consisted of Tizi Ouzou Province. He also became a qadi, or judge, of the GSPC.

Okacha entered northern Mali in 2003 or 2004. Under the command of Mokhtar Belmokhtar, Okacha co-founded the Katiba al-Mulathamoun, one of the brigades of the GSPC. Okacha was sentenced to death in absentia in Algeria for his activities in the GSPC (later renaming to Al-Qaeda in the Islamic Maghreb in 2005). During the GSPC's insurgency in the Sahel in the early 2000s, Okacha took part in several operations. In 2005, he fought in the Lemgheity attack on a Mauritanian army barracks, and in 2007 he planned and executed the El Ghallaouiya ambush. In 2009 he helped assassinate American aid worker Christopher Leggett. In August 2009, he led an attack on the French embassy in Nouakchott, Mauritania, and the kidnapping of an Italian-Burkinabe couple in December 2010. During hostage negotiations, Okacha determined the final ransom prices.

In 2009, Okacha also commanded Katiba al-Furqan. Under his leadership, the katiba assassinated Malian colonel Lamana Ould Bou in Timbuktu. Bou's assassination sparked a falling-out with Belmokhtar. However, he was still on good terms with Abou Zeid, the head of another katiba within AQIM.

=== Mali War ===
Okacha led jihadist forces of Ansar Dine and AQIM alongside Iyad Ag Ghaly, Abou Zeid, and Belmokhtar during the Tuareg rebellion in 2012. The jihadist offensive captured Timbuktu and drove out the MNLA and MAA. Okacha was appointed as co-governor of Timbuktu following its capture, and his reign in the city suppressed looting and distributed food, although enforced extremist interpretations of Sharia law and destroyed world heritage sites in the city.

After the death of Nabil Abou Alqama in September 2012, Droukdel appointed Okacha as "Emir of the Sahara", effectively making him second-in-command of AQIM. Okacha commanded all AQIM forces in the Sahel. In late 2012 and early 2013, Okacha helped Belmokhtar plan and perpetrate the In Amenas hostage crisis. At this time, Belmokhtar was expelled from AQIM and had founded his own group Signatories By Blood.

Okacha left Timbuktu with his men in January 2013 at the start of Operation Barkhane. He reportedly fought at the battle of Ifoghas that same year. On August 10, 2014, French forces captured an AQIM cell near Timbuktu, including a close confidant of Okacha named Abou Tourab.

In January 2016, Okacha applauded the November 2015 Paris attacks and welcomed Belmokhtar's return to AQIM in an interview with Mauritanian news agency al-Akhbar. He deplored Adnan Abu Walid al-Sahrawi's defection to create the predecessor to the Islamic State in the Greater Sahara, but stated he was still in contact with Sahrawi.

Okacha appeared alongside Ghaly, Kouffa, Abu Hassan al-Ansari, and Abu Abderrahman El Senhadji in a video announcing the merger of several Malian jihadist groups into Jama'at Nasr al-Islam wal-Muslimin (JNIM) on January 2, 2017. Ghaly led the new group, and Okacha was appointed second-in-command and commander of Tombouctou Region.

=== Death ===
Okacha was killed on February 21, 2019, during the battle of Elakla when a group of jihadist vehicles were intercepted by French forces. Another prominent jihadist within JNIM, Seifallah Ben Hassine, was killed during the battle as well. Okacha's death was confirmed in a video released by Sedane Ag Hita, who would later succeed Okacha as JNIM's second-in-command. Droukdel also confirmed Okacha's death in February 2020.
