= Lemgheity attack =

Islamist attack on a Mauritanian army barracks

- Part of Islamist insurgency in the Sahel
Date	June 4, 2005
Location	Lemgheity barracks, Tiris Zemmour, Mauritania
Result	GSPC victory

Belligerents
Mauritania	GSPC

Commanders and leaders
El Kory Ould Ahmed †	Mokhtar Belmokhtar; Djamel Okacha; Abderrahman al-Nigiri; Abdallahi Ould Hmeida

Strength
52 men, 10 pickups	150+ men

Casualties and losses
17 killed 35 prisoners 17 injured	5–9 killed

The Lemgheity attack or El Mreiti attack took place on June 4, 2005, when militants from the Salafist Group for Preaching and Combat (GSPC) attacked a Mauritanian army barracks in Lemgheity, in the Tiris Zemmour region of northern Mauritania.

The attack marked the first incursion into Mauritanian territory by the GSPC, and the group's first attack outside of Algerian borders.

== Background ==
The Salafist Group for Preaching and Combat (GSPC) was a more hardline remnant of the Armed Islamic Group that terrorized Algerian civilians during the later part of the Algerian Civil War, before being pushed to the Sahara Desert. In the Mauritanian barracks at Lemgheity, a small oasis along the Mauritanian-Algerian border, fifty-two men and ten pick-ups were stationed at the barracks prior to the attack.

Three days before the battle, the GSPC sent out two scouts; a Malian and a Nigerien, to plan the attack. The GSPC referred to the scouting as "Operation Badr", in reference to the Battle of Badr. The jihadists had over 150 men according to post-battle estimates from the Mauritanian Army, and were commanded by Mokhtar Belmokhtar, Abderrahman al-Nigiri, and Abdellahi Ould Hmeida. Other prominent jihadists such as Djamel Okacha, Jouleibib, and Khaled al-Barnaoui all participated in the Lemgheity attack as well.

Just before the attack, an argument broke out within the GSPC. The mufti of the group, a Mauritanian, asked Belmokhtar to send a summons to the Mauritanian soldiers at the barracks urging them to surrender. Algerian militants in the group reacted harshly to the mufti's proposal, demanding all the soldiers be slaughtered. After some hesitation, Belmokhtar rejected the mufti's proposal, but forbade his men to execute any prisoners.

== Attack ==
The attack began at dawn on June 4, and lasted only fifteen minutes. The jihadists first took control of the barracks' communications post to prevent the soldiers for calling for reinforcements, and then surrounded the weapons depot. The jihadists then launched the attack on the barracks. The Mauritanian forces were caught off guard by the attack; two soldiers tried to flee by foot but were chased and caught by the jihadists. One of the runners, a lieutenant, was shot dead by the jihadists and the other was run over by a pick-up.

The jihadists seized six vehicles and heavy weapons. They loaded all of their loot onto vehicles, and fled towards one of their bases in Hassi Touila, Mali. Along the way, the jihadists buried some of the loot and recorded the GPS locations of the stashes. Mauritanian soldiers who were taken prisoner were later released.

== Aftermath ==
Mauritanian officials recorded fifteen Mauritanian soldiers killed, seventeen injured, and two missing. The captain of the unit, El Kory Ould Ahmed, was killed during the battle as well.

Mauritanian officials also reported the deaths of nine jihadists. The injured soldiers were evacuated to Nouakchott by three planes. The Mauritanian government accused the GSPC of the attack, which the latter claimed in a statement on June 7. The GSPC claimed to have carried out the attack in retaliation for a series of arrests by Mauritanian officials of senior Islamist leaders and GSPC sympathizers, along with the participation of the Mauritanian Army in exercises with the US Army in the Sahara. Lemine Ould Mohamed Salem, a Mauritanian author, reported the death toll as seventeen Mauritanian soldiers killed, seventeen injured, and thirty-five prisoners, compared to five jihadists killed.

Abu Musab al-Zarqawi, leader of Al-Qaeda in Iraq, congratulated the "Maghrebi mujahideen" for their victory on behalf of al-Qaeda. The Lemgheity attack allowed the GSPC to reestablish itself as an international militant group and connect Abdelmalek Droukdel to senior al-Qaeda members, creating a pathway to the formation of Al-Qaeda in the Islamic Maghreb (AQIM) from the GSPC, which occurred in 2006.
