= Tahar Touati =

Algerian diplomat and military representative

- Born: Tahar Touati
- Died: 2012; Mali
- Cause of death: Execution
- Citizenship: Djelfa, Algeria
- Occupations: Vice consul Diplomat

Tahar Touati was an Algerian diplomat and military representative in the Malian city of Gao. Touati was abducted by the Movement for Oneness and Jihad in West Africa in 2012.

== Abduction ==
Touati was one of seven Algerian officials kidnapped from the Algerian embassy in Gao, in April 2012 during the Azawad unrest in the Malian northern city. Three of the diplomats were freed in July 2012. After Algiers arrested 3 extremists leaders, they threatened to execute the hostages if Algiers doesn't release Necib Tayeb, also known as Abderrahmane Abou Ishak Essoufi, a senior member of Al-Qaeda's North Africa branch, Al-Qaeda in the Islamic Maghreb. The group presented a ransom price of $15 million Euros per hostage.

== Execution ==
After an ultimatum given to the Algerian government, the diplomat was executed by the Malian terrorists. "We have carried out our threat. The hostage has been killed," Abu al-Walid Sarhaoui, president of the MUJAO council, said "Algeria had the time to move negotiations along but did not want to. We executed the hostage on Saturday."

Another diplomat, Boualem Sayes, later died in captivity from a chronic illness. The surviving diplomats were released on 31 August 2014. Following their release, Algeria officially confirmed Touati's execution.
