= National Order of Chad =

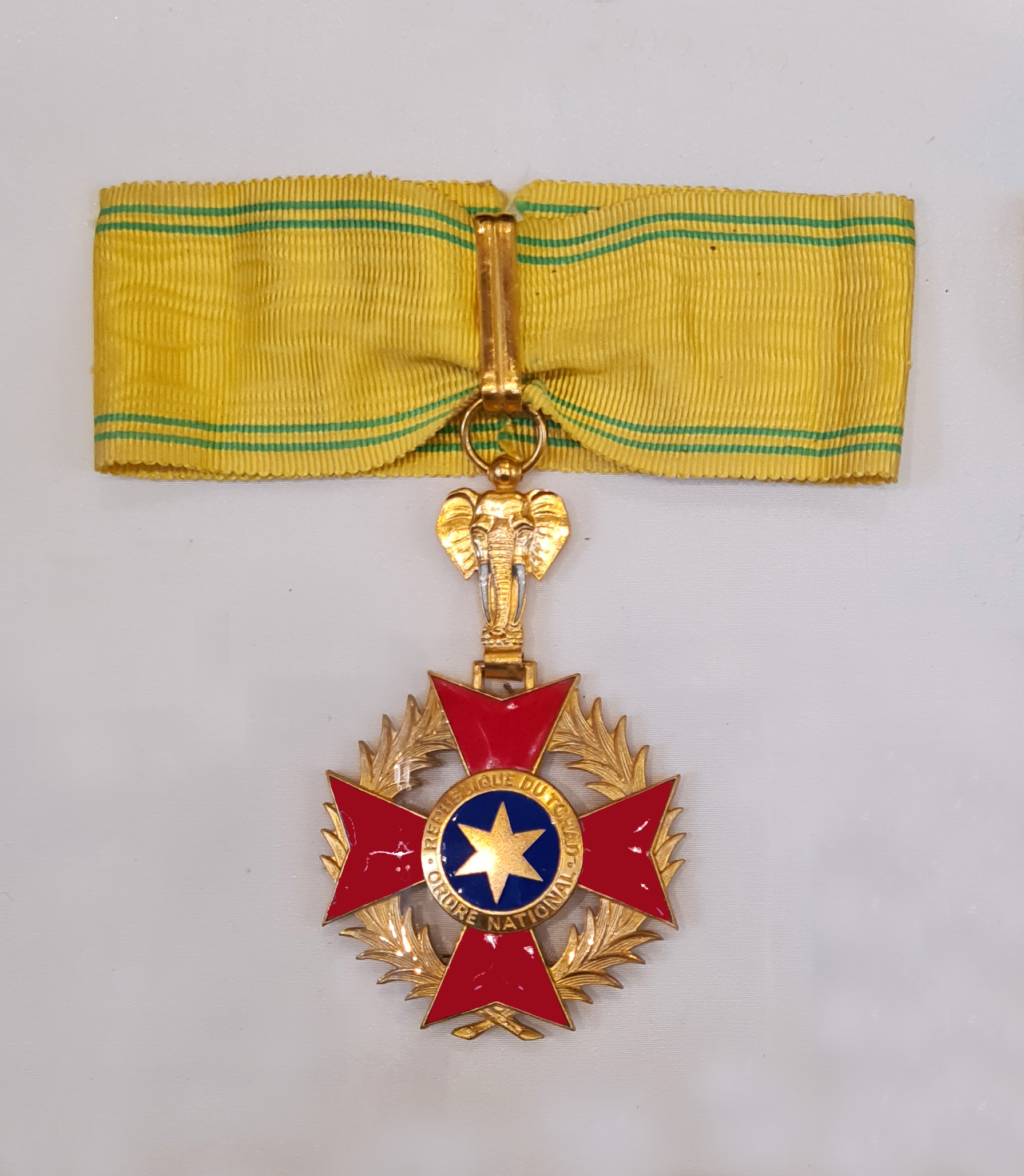
- Commander

Awarded by President of Chad
- Type: Order
- Status: Currently constituted
- Grand Master: President of Chad
- Ribbon bar of the order

The National Order of Chad (French: Ordre national du Tchad) is the preeminent order of merit of the Republic of Chad. It is also featured on the Coat of arms of Chad. The Grand Master of the order is the President of Chad. The number of Grand Cross receipients is capped at 20 living members.

Ribbon bars
| Knight | Officer | Commander | Grand Officer | Grand Cross |

== Recipients ==
- Paul Biya
- Levi Eshkol
- Mordechai Namir
- Bernard Rogel
- Michel Sidibé
- Oumar Bikimo
- Félix Tshisekedi
