= Ibrahim Ag Inawalen =

Malian military officer

- Born: Abeibara, Kidal Region, Mali
- Died: May 18, 2015 Northeast Kidal region, Mali
- Cause of death: French airstrike
- Allegiance: Mali (until 2006); Ansar Dine (2012-2015)
- Rank: Colonel (Malian Army, until 2006); Commander of Aguelhok (Ansar Dine, 2013-2014); Emir (Ansar Dine, 2014-2015)
- Conflicts: Mali War: Battle of Aguelhok; Battle of Tigharghar

Ibrahim Ag Inawalen, nom de guerre Bana, was a Malian soldier and jihadist in Ansar Dine.

== Biography ==
Ag Inawalen was born in Abeïbara, Kidal Region, Mali. He was a colonel in the Malian army until 2006, when he deserted.

When the Mali War began in 2012, Ag Inawalen joined Ansar Dine and became commander of the group in Aguelhok. In January 2012, he took part in the Battle of Aguelhok and may have been responsible for the massacre of the Malian garrison. Ag Inawalen was also responsible for the stoning of a couple in the city who had conceived children outside of marriage.

In 2013, Ag Inawalen took part in the Battle of Tigharghar against French and Chadian forces. He then participated in negotiations with Mohamed Akotey in the release of four hostages from Arlit, and afterward Serge Lazarevic. Following the death of other jihadist leaders, Ag Inawalen became the second-in-command of Ansar Dine around 2014 to 2015.

Ag Inawalen was killed in a French airstrike the night between May 17 and 18, 2015. That night, he met with Abdelkrim al-Targui, a leader of Al-Qaeda in the Islamic Maghreb, in an area northeast of Kidal. The two jihadists and their two bodyguards were killed in the operation.
