= Tunisian Combatant Group =

Salafi jihadist terrorist group in Tunisia

- Dates active: 2000s-2010s
- Split from: Ennahda Movement
- Active regions: Tunisia; Western Europe
- Ideology: Salafi jihadism
- Wars: the Global War on Terrorism

The Tunisian Combatant Group (Arabic: الجماعة التونسية المقاتلة, Jama’a Combattante Tunisienne; French: Groupe Combattant Tunisien) or TCG was a loose network of terrorists with connections to Al-Qaeda that was founded in 2000 and aspired to install an Islamist government in Tunisia. According to the United Nations Security Council (UNSC), TCG is believed to have had terrorist cells in France, Italy, Belgium, Luxembourg, the Netherlands and in the United Kingdom. By the 2010s, after its founders had been arrested and a long period of silence, it was not clear whether the group still existed.

== History ==
The TCG was founded in 2000 by Tarek Ben Habib Maaroufi and Seifallah Ben Hassine, in close cooperation with al-Qaeda. The group aimed to establish an Islamic state in Tunisia that would be ruled according to Sharia. The strategy of the TCG was determined during a meeting in Khost, Afghanistan, where it declared its support for Osama bin Laden. Most of its members were trained in al-Qaeda-linked camps in Afghanistan, and it later organised training for new recruits in the camps. It has been described as an offshoot of the formerly banned Ennahda Movement.

A number of the prisoners held in extrajudicial custody in the United States Guantanamo Bay detainment camps in Cuba remain in detention, in part, because American intelligence analysts allege that they were members of TCG.

Maaroufi was arrested by Belgian authorities in December 2001, and in 2004 was sentenced to five years imprisonment. Since 2004 the TCG did not have capabilities to operate in Tunisia, and consequently moved their base to the Tunisian diaspora in Western Europe.

Hassine was arrested by Turkish authorities in 2003, after which he was extradited to Tunisia, where he was sentenced to 43 years imprisonment. Following the Arab Spring and the Tunisian Revolution in 2011, Hassine was released from prison as part of a general amnesty and went on to found the militant Ansar al-Sharia group.

The TCG is considered inactive due to the arrest of its founders, Maaroufi and Hassine. There are no figures for the number of members that were in the TCG, but the Ansar al-Sharia is thought to have up to 40,000 members.

== European branches ==
The TCG had branches in several European countries. The Italian branch of the organisation was led by Sami ben Khemais Essid, and was dismantled by law enforcement in April 2001. Essid's group was connected to the "Frankfurt group," which was responsible for the Strasbourg Cathedral bombing plot in December 2000. Also in December of 2000, the Tunisian Combatant Group was suspected of plotting to attack the United States, Algerian, and Tunisian embassies in Rome. Several members of the TCG in Italy were convicted for terror-related activities in 2003.

The Belgian branch of the TCG was led by Maaroufi, and was responsible for organizing the travel to Afghanistan of the two terrorists who assassinated the anti-Taliban Afghan political leader Ahmad Shah Massoud on 9 September 2001. The perpetrators were two suicide bombers who were members of the TCG that posed as journalists. In connection to the murder, TCG founder Tarek Maaroufi was arrested and charged with giving assistance, in the form of passports and stolen visas, to the two bombers. The Belgian branch has since also been dismantled. Kamel ben Moussa, an official of the group was arrested in the United Kingdom on 18 December 2001.

== Foreign Relations ==
=== Designation as a terrorist organization ===
Countries and organizations below have officially listed the Tunisian Combat Group as a terrorist organization.

Country	Date	References
United Nations	10 October 2002	
United States	20 December 2004	
Israel		
