= Oumar Bikimo =

Chadian military personnel

- Born: 1960 (age 65–66); Faya-Largeau, Chad
- Military career
- Allegiance: Chad
- Rank: General
- Commands: Commander of Tibesti Operational Region (1986-1987); Head of Central African Multinational Force (2006-2007); Head of MICOPAX (2011-2012); Head of MINUSMA (2014-2015); Commander of G5 Sahel (2018-2023)
- Conflicts: Toyota War; Central African Republic Bush War; Mali War: Battle of Tigharghar
- Awards: National Order of Chad; National Order of Mali

Oumar Bikimo is a Chadian general who has held several positions as the head of Chadian contingents in international peacekeeping missions.

== Biography ==
Bikimo was born in 1960 in Faya-Largeau, Chad. He studied in the United States between 1982 and 1986, 1992 to 1994, and 2003 to 2004. Between 1982 and 1985, Bikimo served as the head of administrative services of the Chadian Presidential Guard. Between 1986 and 1987, during the Toyota War, he served as the head of the Tibesti operational region. Following the war, he rose through several ranks until becoming the Chief of Staff and Administrative and Financial Advisor to the Ministry of Defense.

During the Central African Republic Bush War, Bikimo commanded the Central African Multinational Force. Between 2006 and 2007, he commanded MICOPAX. When the Mali War broke out, Bikimo was appointed commander-in-chief of FATIM, the Chadian forces in northern Mali. He led Chadian forces during the Battle of Tigharghar. Between December 2014 and April 2015, he served as the head of MINUSMA following the departure of Jean Bosco Kazura.

Bikimo was appointed head of the G5 Sahel military force in 2016. He received the National Order of Mali in August 2019. When Mali left the G5 Sahel in 2022, the United Nations stated that thanks to Bikimo, the G5 Sahel was able to continue military operations. Bikimo transferred power to a Burkinabe general in 2023.
