= Al-Mulathameen =

Terrorist militant organization active in North and West Africa

Brigade of the Masked Ones
- Al-Mulathameen
- Leader: Mokhtar Belmokhtar
- Dates active: 2010–2013
- Merged into: Al-Mourabitoun

Al-Mulathameen Brigade (Brigade of the Masked Ones) was a terrorist militant organisation active in North and West Africa founded and led by Mokhtar Belmokhtar who was previously a member of al-Qaeda in the Islamic Maghreb. In 2013 Al-Mulathameen merged with Movement for Oneness and Jihad in West Africa to form Al-Mourabitoun. In 2017 Al-Mourabitoun merged with the Saharan branch of al-Qaeda in the Islamic Maghreb, Ansar Dine, and Macina Liberation Front to form Jama'at Nasr al-Islam wal Muslimin.
