= Salafistes =

2016 French documentary film

- Directed by: François Margolin; Lemine Ould M. Salem
- Written by: François Margolin; Lemine Ould M. Salem
- Starring: Omar Ould Hamaha; François Margolin
- Production company: Margo Cinema
- Distributed by: Margo Cinema (France); Cinema Libre Studio (United States)
- Release date: 2016
- Running time: 75 minutes
- Countries: France; Mali; Mauritania; Tunisia
- Languages: French; Arabic; Bambara; English

Salafistes (Salafists or Jihadists) is a 2016 French documentary film about Islamic terrorism. The film was highly controversial in its native France, and was given a rare rating of 18+ by the French Commission de classification des œuvres cinématographiques.
