= Ansar al-Sharia (Tunisia) =

Tunisian Salafi Jihadist group

Ansar al-Sharia in Tunisia
- Leader: Abu Ayyad al-Tunisi †
- Dates active: 2011 – 2022
- Active regions: Tunisia
- Ideology: Islamism; Salafi jihadism Islamic fundamentalism
- Size: 10,000 (2013)
- Part of: (al-Qaeda) Al-Qaeda

Ansar al-Sharia in Tunisia (Arabic: أنصار الشريعة في تونس, romanized: Supporters of Sharia in Tunisia) was a Salafi Jihadist group that operated in Tunisia. In 2013, the group was estimated to have roughly 10,000 members. It has been listed as a terrorist group by the Tunisian government, Iraq, the United Nations, the United Arab Emirates, the United Kingdom, and the United States. Some of its members may be linked to the 2015 Sousse attacks. In 2013, the group declared allegiance to Al-Qaeda.

== Background ==
Following the Tunisian revolution, many Islamist political prisoners held by the regime of President Zine El Abidine Ben Ali were released, including Seifallah Ben Hassine, who had previously co-founded the Tunisian Combatant Group with Tarek Maaroufi in June 2000.

Abu Ayadh, aka ben Hassine, founded Ansar al-Sharia in late April 2011. The group quickly established a media branch, al-Qairawan Media Foundation, and developed different media outlets including a blog, Facebook page, and a magazine. Ansar al-Sharia held a national conference at Kairouan in 2012 in which Ben Hassine called for the Islamization of Tunisia's media, education, tourism and commercial sectors, and the establishment of an Islamic trade union to confront the secular Tunisian General Labour Union. The group also campaigned for the release of Islamist prisoners, such as Omar Abdel-Rahman, Abu Qatada and Tunisians who had fought with al-Qaeda in Iraq and are held in Iraqi jails.

Members of Ansar al-Sharia have regularly taken part in protests in Tunisia against perceived blasphemy and have been suspected of involvement in a number of violent incidents. The Tunisian Interior Ministry accused the group of masterminding the 2013 wave of political assassinations in Tunisia. Violent incidents attributed to members of the group include attacks on a television station that showed the movie Persepolis in October 2011, attacks on a controversial art exhibit in June 2012, a deadly attack in September 2012 on the US embassy in Tunisia and the assassination of politicians Chokri Belaid (February 2013) and Mohamed Brahmi (July 2013).

The group was designated as a terrorist organisation by the Tunisian government in August 2013. The group was damaged by the widespread arrests that followed this designation, and many of its members left Tunisia, traveling to Libya and joining the local Ansar al-Sharia, or going to Syria and joining the Islamic State of Iraq and the Levant.

An interview conducted over the course of three different meetings between January and March 2013 with a young leader of Ansar al-Sharia based in Tunis describes the intellectual basis for the Salafist movement:

From the perspective of the development of our group’s theoretical framework/worldview, some of the most influential Salafi activists include: Abu Qatada al-Filistini, Abu Mohammed al-Maqdassi, Abu Basir Tartusi, Hani Sabahi, and al-Aulaki. Abu Qatada al-Filistini is probably the most influential among them--our brothers that were in Europe over the past years all flocked to listen to his lessons. It is not strange then that Abu Yadh [aka ben Hassine] himself or Abdallah al-Tunsi [aka ben Hassine?] went to him as well. Sheikh Hani Sabahi is also respected in our movement. We have a steady contact with him and he is very sympathetic to our experience.

Ben Hassine was reportedly killed in a US airstrike in Libya in June 2015. In March 2020, al-Qaeda in the Islamic Maghreb leader Abdelmalek Droukdel announced Ben Hassine's death but did not say when he died.

== Criticism ==
In its weekly newspaper al-Naba, in a biography eulogizing Kamal Zarruq al-Tunisi, a Tunisian leader in the Islamic State of Iraq and the Levant, the Islamic State severely criticized Ansar al-Sharia in Tunisia and its leader Abu Iyad, saying:

The Ansar ash-Shari’ah organization, which was at the forefront, suffered from several problems, the most important being the misguidance of its leader, Abu ‘Iyad, and his promotion of Ayman al-Zawahiri's ideas regarding their intention to make Tunisia an ’ard da’wah" (land of invitation) and not an "ard jihad" (land of waging jihad), which reassured the taghut so-called "post-Arab revolutions governments" that they would not fight them, instead asking them to give them room to simply "invite". It also suffered from Abu ‘Iyad’s ideas that were restricted to the country, focused on limiting the work to Tunisia, and based on his desire to lead the global jihad, despite his lack of experience and his weakness, which in turn led his organization into the abyss when the new taghut revealed to them its new face. Thus, those connected to him experienced the worst of torture, many of them being leaders of the organization, and only a few people survived this holocaust to which they were led by Abu ‘Iyad and his foolishness, frailty, and preferring his own opinions and those of his shaykh Abu Qatada al-Filastini and his "emir" Ayman adh-Dhawahiri. Those few who survived were they whom Allah guided to hijrah and jihad for the cause of Allah by opposing Abu Ayadh, who refused that the youth should emerge onto the battlefields of jihad, and specifically in Sham, wanting to keep them under his control, to use them in his failed projects and hand them over with his foolishness, to the tawaghit.

== Foreign relations ==
=== Designation as a terrorist organization ===
Countries and organizations below have officially listed the Ansar al-Sharia in Tunisia as a terrorist organization.

Country/Organisation	Date	References
Tunisia	August 2013	
United States	23 September 2014	
United Kingdom	April 2014	
United Arab Emirates	November 2014	
United Nations	23 September 2014	
Iraq	?	

== See also ==
- List of terrorist incidents in Tunisia
