= Seifallah Ben Hassine =

Tunisian islamist militant (1965–2019)

Seifallah Ben Omar Ben Mohamed Ben Hassine (Arabic: سيف الله بن عمر بن محمد بن حسين, romanized: Sayf Allāh ibn ‘Umar ibn Muhammad ibn Ḥusayn), known as Abu Ayyad al-Tunisi (Arabic: أبو عياض التونسي, romanized: ’Abū ‘Iyāḍ at-Tunūsī), was a Tunisian Islamist militant and the founder and leader of Ansar al-Sharia (Tunisia).

== History ==
He was born on 8 November 1965 in Menzel Bourguiba in northern Tunisia. He became involved in 1980 with the 'Movement of Islamic Tendency' which later became the Ennahda Movement. He was a senior leader in the Tunisian Islamic Front, the armed wing of the party, by 1986.

He was in Saudi Arabia with Abd al-Aziz ibn Baz and may have had interaction with the Armed Islamic Group of Algeria and the Libyan Islamic Fighting Group.

He fled Tunisia following a crackdown by the regime of Zine El Abidine Ben Ali against the student movements in 1987. He was sentenced in absentia by the Tunis military court to two years in prison for his participation in the events.

He first moved to Morocco where he studied in the Faculty of Legal Sciences at the Mohammed I University. It was at this time he married. He later went to the United Kingdom in the 1990s and studied under the al-Qaeda cleric Abu Qatada.

He then fought alongside Osama bin Laden in Afghanistan and in 2000 was the co-founder of a group of Tunisian militants known as the Tunisian Combat Group. He ran a guesthouse for Tunisians in Jalalabad and the men who stayed there were connected to al-Qaeda. He provided the two Tunisian suicide bombers who killed Ahmad Shah Massoud, leader of the Northern Alliance. Massoud was killed by the two men, who were posing as journalists, two days before the September 11 attacks.

He was arrested in Turkey in February 2003, and was subsequently extradited to Tunisia. A military court sentenced him to 43 years in prison. After the Tunisian Revolution which overthrew Zine El Abidine Ben Ali, he was released from prison in March 2011 under an amnesty and founded Ansar al-Sharia (Tunisia) in late April 2011.

Ben Hassine was involved in an attack on the United States Embassy in Tunis on September 14, 2012. Later that year, while he was still on the run after the US embassy attack, he goaded police by preaching in a mosque in central Tunis. Despite the presence of a large number of security forces, a crowd of his supporters hid him and helped him evade the police cordon.

He was based in Libya since 2013 and ran training camps and a network of militant cells across the region.

== Reports of death ==
In July 2015, an anonymous U.S. intelligence official told The New York Times that Ben Hassine was believed to have been killed near Ajdabiya in eastern Libya on June 14, 2015, in an American airstrike intended to target Mokhtar Belmokhtar.

== Family ==
He was married to a Moroccan woman and had three children.

== Death ==
On 28 February 2020, al-Qaeda in the Islamic Maghreb leader Abdelmalek Droukdel announced Ben Hassine's death but did not say when he died.
