= Touati Benoukraf =

French biologist (born 1980)

- Born: 1980 (age 45–46); Aups, France
- Education: University of Aix-Marseille II (B.Sc, Ms, Ph.D)
- Scientific career
- Fields: Computational Biology and (Epi)genomics
- Institutions: Memorial University of Newfoundland
- Thesis: Analyse bioinformatique des mécanismes de régulation durant le développement précoce des cellules T (2010)
- Doctoral advisor: Pierre Ferrier
- Website: https://benoukraf-lab.com

Touati Benoukraf (born 1980) is a computational and molecular biologist. He holds a Canada Research Chair in Bioinformatics for Personalized Medicine at the Faculty of Medicine of Memorial University of Newfoundland since November 2018. His research focus is on computational (epi)genomics.
