= Necib Tayeb =

- Other name: Abderrahmane Abou Ishak Essoufi
- Allegiance: AQIM, GSPC, GIA
- Motive: Jihad
- Capture status: Detained

Necib Tayeb a.k.a. Abderrahmane Abou Ishak Essoufi is a leading member of the criminal organization called Al-Qaeda in the Islamic Maghreb. He is the head of AQIM's legal committee, member of the council of notables and its first judge.

== Criminal activities ==
Tayeb is one of the most senior members of the criminal organizations, previously called the Salafist Group for Call and Combat (GSPC), and a former member of the Islamic Armed Group GIA. He has been on the wanted list since 1995.

=== Arrest ===
Tayeb, head of the judicial commission and a member of AQIM's council of notables, was arrested by Algerian security services near Berriane in the Ghardaia province in August 2012. At the time of his arrest, he was accompanied by two men on a 4x4 and headed for the Sahel in the south.

It is said to be very close to the national leader Abdelmalek Droukdal. APS describes his arrest near the Berriane on 15 August 2012 as a "fatal blow". The arrested terrorist was on a mission to the Sahel region. He was assigned by the organization's "national leader" to "gather together AQMI's leaders in the Sahel, like Mokhtar Belmokhtar, Abdelhamid Abou Zeid and Nabil Abou Alkama, to put an end to disagreements and conflicts within the organization's leadership.
