= Bernard Barrera =

French military personnel

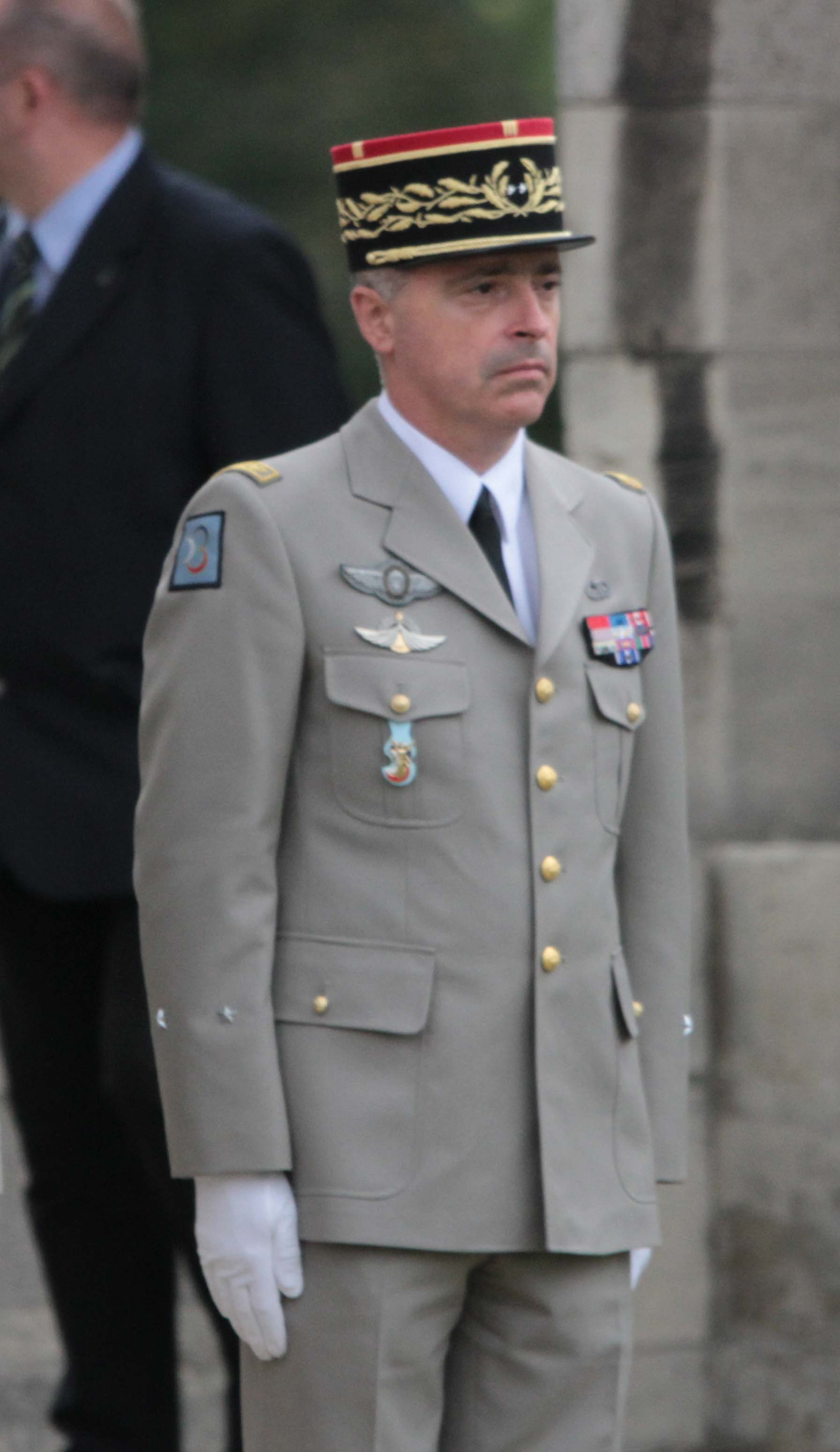
- General Barrera in Vincennes in September 2011
- Born: 4 February 1962 (age 64); Marseille, France
- Military career
- Allegiance: France
- Branch: French Army
- Service years: 1982 –
- Rank: Général de Division
- Commands: 3rd Light Armoured Brigade
- Awards: Commandeur de la Légion d'honneur ordre national du Mérite; Croix de la Valeur militaire National Order of Mali

Bernard Barrera (born 4 February 1962, in Marseille) is a general in the French Army. As commander of the 3rd Mechanized Brigade, he was in charge of ground operations during Operation Serval in Mali in 2013.

== Decorations ==
French

- Commander de la Légion d'honneur
- Grand Officer de l'ordre national du Mérite
- Croix de la Valeur militaire (4 citations)
- Croix du combattant
- Médaille d'Outre-Mer
- Médaille de la Défense nationale
- Médaille de reconnaissance de la Nation
- Médaille commémorative française

Foreign decorations

- Médaille de l'OTAN
- National Order of Mali
