= Battle of Tigharghar =

2013 Islamists rebels ambush of Chadian soldiers in the Adrar des Ifoghas mountains

Battle of Tigharghâr
- Part of the Northern Mali conflict
Date	12 March 2013
Location	Adrar des Ifoghas, Mali
Result	Chadian victory

Belligerents
Chad	AQIM

Commanders and leaders
(Chad) Oumar Bikimo (Chad) Issakh Abdallah Adam†	Unknown

Casualties and losses
1 soldier killed 1 injured	6 killed 5 captured

On 12 March 2013, a party of Islamist rebels ambushed a squadron of Chadian soldiers during "clean-up operations" in the Adrar des Ifoghas mountains. Heavy gunfire was exchanged between the two leading to a brief standoff. A soldier was killed by a stray bullet during the confrontation that also led to the deaths of six rebels. A pick-up truck was taken with five Islamists.
