= Abdelhamid Abou Zeid =

Algerian al-Qaeda member (1965–2013)

- Abou Zeid in Mali, before 2013
- Born: 12 December 1965; Algeria
- Died: 25 February 2013 (aged 47)
- Other names: Emir of the South; Mosab Abdelouadoud
- Military career
- Allegiance: Al-Qaeda
- Branch: AQIM (?–2013)
- Service years: ?–2013
- Rank: Governor (Emir) of Timbuktu
- Conflicts: Insurgency in the Maghreb: Operation Enduring Freedom – Trans Sahara; Northern Mali conflict; Battle of Diabaly; Battles of Gao and Timbuktu

Abdelhamid Abou Zeid (born Mohamed Ghadir; (Note: The Algerian press has raised questions about his legal identity: Abid Hamadou or Mohamed Ghedir) 12 December 1965 – 25 February 2013) was an Algerian national and Islamist jihadi militant and smuggler who, in about 2010, became one of the top three military commanders of al-Qaeda in the Islamic Maghreb (AQIM), a Mali-based militant organization. He competed as the chief rival of Mokhtar Belmokhtar, an Algerian national who had become the major commander in AQIM and later head of his own group. Both gained wealth and power by kidnapping and ransoming European nationals. After taking control of Timbuktu in 2012, Abou Zeid established sharia law and destroyed Sufi shrines.

Abou Zeid was killed by French and Chadian troops on 25 February 2013 in fighting in Northern Mali. On 23 March, Zeid's death was "definitively confirmed" by the French president's office.

== Early life ==
Abou Zeid was born in Algeria on 12 December 1965.

== Militant activities ==
Abou Zeid was one of the senior members of Al-Qaeda in the Islamic Maghreb, (AQIM), an Islamist militant organization. He had been promoted by the emir of AQIM, Abu Musab Abdel Wadoud (a.k.a. Abdelmalek Droukdel); some commentators speculated that Wadoud wanted to have an alternative to Mokhtar Belmokhtar, an increasingly powerful commander in AQIM also operating in Mali.

Abou Zeid is believed to have ordered the executions of hostages, including Edwin Dyer in 2009 and Michel Germaneau in 2010. He is believed to have been behind the kidnapping of more than 20 Westerners between 2008 and 2013. The victims were held to gain ransoms to fund the activities of AQIM.

When Abou Zeid controlled Timbuktu, he ordered amputations as punishment, and his forces destroyed historic Sufi shrines.

With both Abou Zeid and Belmokhtar exerting power in the Sahel region, in the fall of 2012, Wadoud appointed Djamel Okacha (also known as Yahya Abou el-Hammam) as the overall commander of AQIM in the Sahara, in an effort to keep control. According to a memo from him to Abou Zeid found in Timbuktu, Wadoud was concerned that the rapid push to establish Sharia law would provoke armed intervention. In January 2013, France and West African nations responded to the Malian government's request for help and entered with troops in northern Mali to dislodge AQIM.

Leading a contingent of Islamists in central Mali, Abou Zeid attacked the small town of Diabaly in January 2013.

At the request of the Malian government, the French launched a quick intervention in January to drive the radical Islamists from northern Mali. They entered the area with 1,200 French troops, 800 Chadian soldiers and some elements of the Malian army, fighting in the Adrar mountain range.

== Death ==
Abou Zeid was reported killed along with 40 militants on 25 February 2013, by French and Chadian troops near the mountainous region of Tigargara, Northern Mali. At the time, he and his men were believed to be holding at least four French citizens who had been kidnapped in 2010 in Niger. His death was first reported by Algeria's independent Ennahar TV on 28 February 2013. On 1 March 2013, Idriss Deby, President of Chad, said his forces had killed Abou Zeid during fighting in northern Mali. His death was confirmed by an Al Qaeda member on 5 March. According to a Reuters security source, he was replaced as AQIM's leader by Algerian Djamel Okacha (a.k.a. Yahya Abu al-Humam).

On 16 June 2013, AQIM officially confirmed the death of Abou Zeid in a martyrdom statement.
