= Movement for Oneness and Jihad in West Africa =

Militant Islamist organisation

Monotheism and Jihad Movement in West Africa
- جماعة التوحيد والجهاد في غرب أفريقيا; Jamāʿat at-tawḥīd wal-jihād fī gharb ʾafrīqqīyā
- Flag
- Leaders: Hamada Ould Mohamed Kheirou † (Alias Abu Qumqum); Abu al Walid al Sahrawi (as Emir of the Mujahideen Shura Council in the Islamic Emirate of Gao)
- Dates active: October 2011–2013
- Allegiance: Islamic Emirate of Gao (2012–2013)
- Groups: Mujahideen Shura Council in Gao; Katibat Salahaddin; Ansar al Sunnah; Abdullah Azzam; Al Zarqawi; Abu al Laith al Libi; Martyrdom-Seekers
- Active regions: Algeria; Mali; Niger
- Wars: Insurgency in the Maghreb and the Northern Mali conflict

The Movement for Oneness and Jihad in West Africa (abbreviated MOJWA) (Note: Also called the Movement for Tawhid (Unity) and Jihad in West Africa or Movement for Unity and Jihad in West Africa (abbreviated MUJWA; Arabic: جماعة التوحيد والجهاد في غرب أفريقيا Jamāʿat at-tawḥīd wal-jihād fī gharb ʾafrīqqīyā; French: Mouvement pour l'unicité et le jihad en Afrique de l'Ouest, abbreviated MUJAO)) was a militant Islamist organisation that broke off from al-Qaeda in the Islamic Maghreb with the intended goal of spreading jihad across a larger section of West Africa, as well as demanding the expulsion of all French interests (especially military and resources) that operated in West Africa, which they regarded as "colonialist occupiers".

Its operations were largely limited to southern Algeria and northern Mali. The group continued to be affiliated with AQIM and was sanctioned by the United Nations Security Council in 2012.

One faction of the group merged with Mokhtar Belmokhtar's Al-Mulathameen into a new group called Al-Mourabitoun in 2013.

== History ==
The Movement for Oneness and Jihad in West Africa (MOJWA) broke with al-Qaeda in the Islamic Maghreb (AQIM) in mid-2011 with the alleged goal of spreading jihad further into areas of West Africa that were not within the scope of AQIM. Some analysts believe that the split of the Black African-led MOJWA is a consequence of the Algerian predominance on AQIM's leadership.

MOJWA released a video that referenced their ideological affinity for such figures as al-Qaeda founder Osama bin Laden and Taliban leader Mullah Omar, but placed greater emphasis on historical figures of West African origin, claiming to be the "ideological descendants" of Cheikhou Amadou, Usman Dan Fodio and El Hadj Umar Tall. "Today we are inaugurating jihad in West Africa" claimed one of the militants, who spoke in English and Hausa. Al-Qaeda-affiliated groups in Algeria, Mali, Niger and Mauritania had been present for at least a decade prior to the group's founding and escalated further following the 2011 Libyan civil war and the influx of weapons in the desert area.

Following the Battle of Gao, MOJWA warned that it would not hesitate to attack any countries or personnel that would be involved in an invasion force within the Azawad region. On 20 December 2012, the United Nations Security Council passed resolution 2085 which sanctioned the group as part of the "Al-Qaeda sanctions list."

In the January 2013 Battle of Konna, MOJWA temporarily gained control of Konna before being forced to retreat by the Malian army and its allied French armed forces.

In August 2013, a faction of the group led by Ahmed el Tilemsi merged with the Masked Men Brigade into a group called Al-Mourabitoun. Another faction of MOJWA led by Sultan Ould Badi continued to operate independently.

== Leadership ==
Mauritanian Hamada Ould Mohamed Kheirou is believed by the local media to be the first chief of the group, as the principal speaker on 12 December 2011 video. Mauritanian authorities issued an international arrest warrant on 28 December 2011. Other key members were Algerian Ahmed Al-Talmasi and Malian Sultan Ould Badi, who is defined by Malian authorities as a "drug trafficker". Omar Ould Hamaha was MOJWA's military commander ("chief of staff"), before being killed by French security forces in March 2014.

== Incidents ==
The first appearance of the Movement for Oneness and Jihad in West Africa was on 22 October 2011, when the group kidnapped three western aid workers from the Sahrawi refugee camps in Tindouf, Algeria. The Polisario Front, which administers the refugee camps, initially blamed AQIM. MOJWA released in December a video of the abducted Italian and Spanish women as well as a Spanish man, demanding 30 million euros for their release. The three hostages were freed in July 2012 in exchange for $18 million and the release of three Islamists. On 3 March 2012, MOJWA claimed responsibility for a suicide car bombing at a paramilitary police base in Tamanrasset that resulted in injuries to 10 soldiers and one civilian, some of whom were in serious condition.

After warning that it would attack French targets for their role in attacking northern Mali, MOJWA were suspected of carrying out two car bombings in Niger on 23 May 2013. In March 2014, Malian military sources reported that Omar Ould Hamaha and Abu Walid Sahraoui had been killed by a French air strike in the northeast. Reports of Sahraoui's death were later proven false.

The Niger government accused MOJWA of the kidnapping of American aid worker Jeffery Woodke on 12 Oct 2016. Gunmen killed the two security guards at Woodke's house, captured Woodke and reportedly took him across the Mali border towards Menaka.

=== Capture and seizure of Gao ===
During the 2012 Tuareg rebellion in late March, MOJWA took part in the capture of Gao, along with Ansar Dine. On 9 April, MOJWA claimed the kidnapping of seven Algerians from the consulate in Gao, including the consul and vice-consul. The kidnapping of the consul was filmed in progress by Aljazeera. Three days later, it issued a statement that read the hostages were being treated well "according to Sharia law" and they asked for the liberation of imprisoned members of MOJWA in Algeria in exchange for the consular staff, according to sources mentioned by the Algerian newspaper Echorouk. Three of the diplomats were freed in July 2012.

After Algeria arrested three Islamists leaders, MOJWA threatened to execute the hostages unless Algeria released Necib Tayeb, also known as Abderrahmane Abou Ishak Essoufi, a senior member of AQIM. The vice-counsul, Tahar Touati was executed on 1 September, according to Agence Nouakchott d'information. Walid Abu Sarhaoui, the president of MOJWA's governing council, said: "We have carried out our threat. The hostage has been killed. Algeria had the time to move negotiations along but did not want to. We executed the hostage on Saturday."

Algeria's Foreign Ministry released a statement that read: "The statement announcing the execution of the Algerian vice-consular official can only fuel surprise and justify the steps taken to try to confirm the accuracy of the information sent out on late Saturday." At the same time, Algeria's policy of not negotiating or releasing convicted terrorists from prisons was seen by El Watan as an hindrance to the release of the other hostages. Another diplomat, Boualem Sayes, later died in captivity from a chronic illness. The surviving diplomats were released on 31 August 2014.

On 27 June 2012, MOJWA fighters clashed with the forces of the National Movement for the Liberation of Azawad. MOJWA took control of the governor's palace and MNLA Secretary General Bilal Ag Acherif's residence, as well as taking 40 MNLA soldiers prisoner. Ag Acherif was wounded in the fighting and was evacuated to Burkina Faso for medical treatment. MOJWA's fighters patrolled the city's streets through the night and arrested at least three people carrying guns.

On 1 September 2012, MOJWA took over the northern town of Douentza, which had previously been held by a Songhai secular militia, the Ganda Iso (Songhai for "Sons of the Land"). Omar Ould Hamaha said that the group had an agreement with the Ganda Iso to govern the town, but had then decided to take it over when the militia appeared to be acting independently. After MOJWA's troops surrounded the town, the militia reportedly surrendered without a fight and were then disarmed.

The United States listed it a terror group on 7 December 2012 and the United Nations two days earlier. On 2 June 2014 the government of Canada listed it as a terrorist group.
