= Adrar des Ifoghas =

Mountain range at the Algeria–Mali border

Coordinates: 19°07′N 1°45′E

- Adrar n Ifoghas
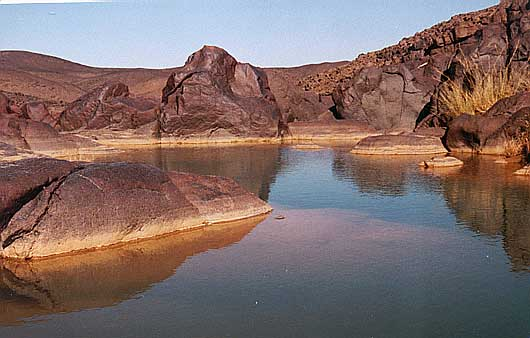
- View of a guelta near Oubankort

Highest point
- Elevation: 890 m (2,920 ft)

Geography
- Topographic map of the Kidal Region
- Location: Central Sahara
- Countries: Mali; Algeria
- Regions/Provinces: Kidal Region; Tamanrasset; Adrar

The Adrar des Ifoghas (also Adrar des Iforas; Tamasheq: ⴰⴷⵔⴰⵔ ⵏ ⵉⴼⵓⵖⴰⵙ in Tifinagh; Adrar n Ifoghas; Arabic: أدرار إيفوغاس Ifoghas' Mountains) is a massif located in the Kidal Region of Mali, reaching into Algeria. It has an area of around 250,000 square kilometers (97,000 square miles).

== Geography ==
The Adrar des Ifoghas area is characterized by wide, shallow valleys and is strewn with piles of eroded granite blocks. The massif's valleys open to the Tamesna plain on the east, to the Telemsi fosse on the west, to the western basin of the Azaouak valley on the south and to the Tanezrouft on the north. Settlements of the area include Kidal, Aguel'hoc, Boghassa, Essouk and Tessalit.

The Adrar des Ifoghas is known locally as "Adagh". "Adrar" is the Berber word for mountain, while "Ifogha" is the name of an aristocratic Tuareg clan, "Kel Ifoghas", who have dominated the region for generations. Like most Tuareg, the Kel Ifoghas are nomadic, raising camels, goats and sheep for sustenance and for sale.

The area is rich in archaeological remains, particularly rock drawings which depict men hunting, farming and cattle-rearing. The skeleton of Asselar man (c. 6,400 BP) was also found in the area by Wladimir Besnard and Théodore Monod. The Adrar des Ifoghas has also become popular for treks.

== Recent history ==
In 2013, the rugged badlands became a refuge for Islamist fighters fleeing French intervention in the Mali civil war. On 22 February, a battle was fought in Adrar des Ifoghas, killing 25 Chadians, including Abdel Aziz Hassane Adam, the leading Chadian special forces commander in Mali, and 93 Islamists. On 12 March, a battle took place in the village of Tigharghar, killing one Chadian soldier and six Islamists. The battle resulted in the Chadians taking the village.
