= Mokhtar Belmokhtar =

Algerian al-Qaeda member (1972–2016)

Mokhtar Belmokhtar مختار بلمختار
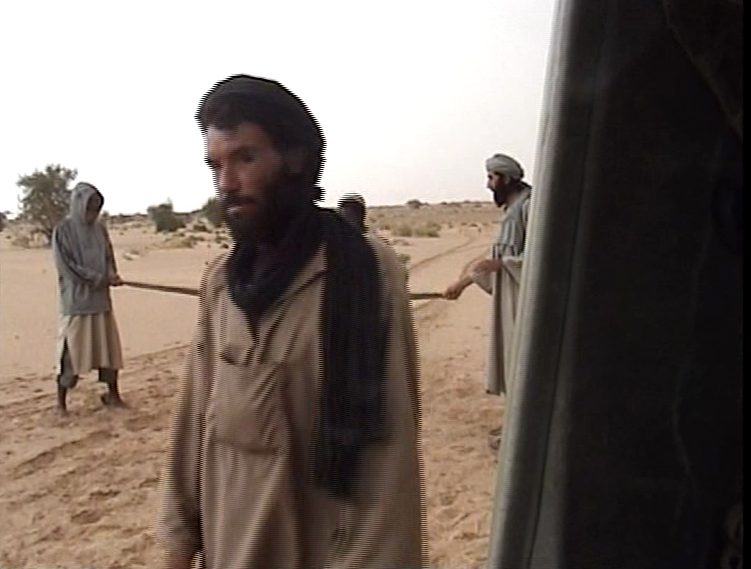
- Mokhtar around 2010

Emir of Al-Mourabitoun
- In office 22 August 2013 – November 2016
- Preceded by: Position created
- Succeeded by: Position abolished

Personal details
- Born: 1 June 1972 Ghardaia, Algeria
- Died: November 2016 (aged 44) Libya

Military service
- Allegiance: Al-Qaeda
- Branch/service: AQC (1991–1993); GIA (1993–1998); AQIM (1998–2012); AML (2012–2013); AMB (2013–2016)
- Years of service: 1991–2016
- Rank: Emir of Al-Mourabitoun; Brigadier general of AQIM
- Battles/wars: Afghan Civil War; Algerian Civil War; Maghreb Insurgency; Operation Juniper Shield; Attack on In Amenas

Mokhtar Belmokhtar (/ˈmɒktɑːr bɛlˈmɒktɑːr/; Arabic: مختار بلمختار; (Note: pronounced in Algerian Arabic as [moxtɑr bəlmoxtɑr]) 1 June 1972 – November 2016), also known as Khalid Abu al-Abbas, the One-Eyed, Nelson, Mr. Marlboro and the Uncatchable, was an Algerian leader of the group Al-Murabitoun, former military commander of Al-Qaeda in the Maghreb, smuggler and weapons dealer. He was twice convicted and sentenced to death in absentia under separate charges in Algerian courts: in 2007 for terrorism and in 2008 for murder. In 2004, he was sentenced to life imprisonment in Algeria for terrorist activities.

Born in northern Algeria, Belmokhtar traveled to Afghanistan in 1991 to fight with the mujahadeen against the pro-Soviet government following the withdrawal of Soviet Union troops. There, he lost his left eye while mishandling explosives. He later joined the Islamist GIA fighting in the Algerian Civil War and following that became a commander in the Mali-based Islamist Al-Qaeda in the Islamic Maghreb (AQIM).

In December 2012, Belmokhtar announced he was leaving AQIM and headed his own organization, dubbed the Al-Mulathameen ("Masked") Brigade (also known as the al-Mua'qi'oon Biddam ("Those who Sign with Blood" Brigade). In January 2013, the Brigade took more than 800 people hostage at the Tigantourine gas facility in Algeria. 39 hostages were executed and one Algerian killed before the facility was recaptured by Algerian forces, who killed 29 members of the Brigade. The Brigade was listed by the US State Department as a Foreign Terrorist Organization in December 2013.

On 2 March 2013, the Chadian state television and the Chadian Army reported that Belmokhtar had been killed in a raid by Chadian troops against a terrorist base in Mali. However, two months later, Belmokhtar claimed responsibility for two suicide truck bomb attacks – on a French-owned uranium mine in Arlit, Niger, and a military base 150 miles away in Agadez.

On 14 June 2015, Libya's government announced that Belmokhtar was killed in a U.S. airstrike inside Libya. U.S. officials confirmed the airstrike and that Belmokhtar was a target, but were unable to confirm that Belmokhtar was killed. In November 2016, Belmokhtar was targeted again in a French airstrike, conducted by French aircraft in southern Libya, based on intelligence from the United States.

The Office of the Director of National Intelligence confirmed years later on their website that Belmokhtar was indeed killed in 2016.

== Personal life ==
Mokhtar Belmokhtar was born in Ghardaïa, Algeria, on 1 June 1972 to a father named "Mohamed" and a mother named "Zohra Chemkha". He married four local Berber and Tuareg women from prominent families in northern Mali, cementing his ties in the region. He named a son Osama, after Bin Laden. Omar Ould Hamaha, his uncle by marriage, was the commander of a smaller AQIM offshoot. In October 2015, Al-Qaeda spokesman, Hassan Abderraouf announced that Mokhtar was killed, but did not reveal when.

== Militant activities ==
=== Afghan and Algerian civil wars ===
Belmokhtar became interested in jihad as a schoolboy. In 1991, at the age of 19, he traveled to Afghanistan and Pakistan to fight with the mujahadeen against the Afghan Communist government in the Civil War in Afghanistan. He trained in al-Qaeda's Afghan camps at Khalden and Jalalabad.

Belmokhtar lost his left eye in the 1990s while mishandling explosives. He wore a false eye in its place after that.

He returned in 1993 to his native Algeria. There, he joined the Armed Islamic Group of Algeria (GIA), an extremist Islamist organisation dedicated to overthrowing the Algerian government and replacing it with an Islamic state. He fought in the long and bloody Algerian Civil War to overthrow the Algerian government. The GIA massacred civilians, sometimes wiping out entire villages. Belmokhtar's fierce reputation earned him prestige with the GIA, and he quickly rose to the rank of commander. However, as the GIA began to splinter and fall apart in the late 1990s, Belmokhtar left the organization.

=== GSPC/AQIM Commander ===
In 1998, Belmokhtar joined a new splinter group, the militant Algeria-based Islamist Salafist Group for Preaching and Combat (GSPC), later known as Al-Qaeda in the Islamic Maghreb (AQIM). Its goal was to overthrow the Algerian government and institute an Islamic state, and its members carried out suicide bombings against Algerian government targets. Soon, he became an effective GSPC field commander. He went to Tamanrasset, Algeria, to raise money for jihad. He gradually established an elaborate smuggling network in the ninth region, covering southern Algeria where many of the most profitable smuggling routes exist.

He smuggled cigarettes, drugs, stolen cars, diamonds, and people, using the money to buy weapons to supply insurgent groups. He also kidnapped for ransom dozens of Westerners, including diplomats, aid workers, doctors, and tourists from France, Germany, Austria, United Kingdom, Spain, Switzerland, Italy, the Netherlands, Sweden, and Canada. The kidnappings are believed to have netted him what the US State Department estimated as $50 million in ransoms for the Europeans. The global intelligence company Stratfor reported that Belmokhtar commanded an estimated $3 million per European captive. In 2003, for example, he is believed to have received $6.5 million in ransom money for the return of 32 tourists taken captive in the Sahara Desert.

In 2003, the U.S. military had Belmokhtar under surveillance in the desert in northern Mali. Military commanders suggested launching a missile airstrike against him. But Vicki Huddleston, the U.S. Ambassador to Mali at the time, vetoed the operation, arguing that Belmokhtar was not important enough to risk the possible repercussions. General Charles Wald wanted to provide information to Algeria and Mali so they could act on their own, but was refused permission by civilian U.S. leaders.

In June 2005, Belmokhtar and his men attacked a Mauritanian military garrison in El Mreiti. They killed at least 15 Mauritanian soldiers, and captured a significant number of weapons.

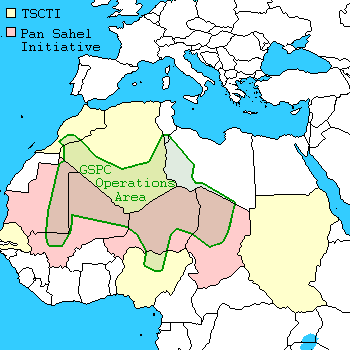
Al-Qaeda Organization in the Islamic Maghreb area of operations

By the time GSPC developed into Al-Qaeda in the Islamic Maghreb (AQIM) in 2006, Belmokhtar's reputation as a hardened fighter, leader, and financier gained him standing with the emir Abu Musab Abdel Wadoud (a.k.a. Abdelmalek Droukdel). He was appointed as a commander of his own brigade of AQIM. Belmokhtar's unit was particularly effective in Mauritania, where it was responsible for several armed attacks and kidnappings (See 2007 killing of French tourists in Mauritania).

In 2008, his men kidnapped the Canadian diplomats Robert Fowler and Louis Guay, who were working for the United Nations, and held them for 130 days.

In 2011, his men attempted to assassinate the Israeli ambassador in Mauritania, engaging in a drive by shooting of the Israeli embassy and shooting a nightclub that Belmokhtar claimed the ambassador had been in moments earlier.

AQIM is thought to be the wealthiest al-Qaeda branch, after having gained ransoms of tens of millions of dollars for the release of kidnapped western hostages.

As Belmokhtar's power and prestige grew, Wadoud began to view him as a threat to his own power. Wadoud gave more responsibility to Belmokhtar's rival commander, Abdelhamid Abou Zeid, to deflect Belmokhtar's growing authority in Algeria and Mali. In late 2012, Belmokhtar was either removed or chose to quit AQIM. Andy Morgan of The Independent opined that Belmokthar was ousted by Wadoud due to his "fractious behaviour".

==== Letter of complaint ====
According to the Associated Press, a letter addressed to Belmokhtar ("Abu Khaled"), signed by the 14-member Shura Council of AQIM and dated 3 October, details "in page after scathing page" complaints that he "didn't answer his phone when they called, failed to turn in his expense reports, ignored meetings and refused time and again to carry out orders. Most of all, they claimed he had failed to carry out a single spectacular operation, despite the resources at his disposal". The letter describes a delegation sent to contact Belmokhtar that spent three years lost in the desert and then disintegrated without having reached him.

It criticizes his plan to resign and start a separate organization taking orders from al-Qaida central headquarters not AQIM.

Your letter ... contained some amount of backbiting, name-calling and sneering, ... We refrained from wading into this battle in the past out of a hope that the crooked could be straightened by the easiest and softest means. ... But the wound continued to bleed, and in fact increasingly bled, until your last letter arrived, ending any hope of stanching the wound and healing it.

Why do the successive emirs of the region only have difficulties with you? You in particular every time? Or are all of them wrong and brother Khaled is right?

AP states the letter, which was found "inside a building formerly occupied" by Belmokhtar fighters in Mali, has been authenticated by three different counterterrorism experts.

==== Charges and sentencings ====
In 2003, the United Nations designated Belmokhtar as an al Qaeda-affiliated terrorist and the US Treasury Department listed him as a financier of a terrorist organization. In 2004, an Algerian court sentenced him in absentia to lifetime imprisonment for forming "terrorist" groups, robbery, detention, and use of illegal weapons. In 2007, another Algerian court sentenced him to death for forming terrorist groups, carrying out armed attacks, kidnapping foreigners, and importing and trafficking in illegal weapons. In 2008, an Algerian court convicted and sentenced him to death for murdering 13 customs officers. In 2013, a new organization was classified as a terrorist group.

=== Masked Brigade (Those who Sign with Blood Brigade) ===
Belmokhtar formed and commanded his own jihadist group, the Islamist al-Mulathameen (Masked) Brigade, or al-Mua'qi'oon Biddam (Those who Sign with Blood) Brigade. Like Wadoud, he continues to pledge allegiance to and take direction from al-Qaeda emir Ayman al-Zawahiri. His group allied with another Al Qaeda splinter group, the Movement for Oneness and Jihad in West Africa. By mid-January 2013, the two groups held more than a dozen Western hostages.

==== In Aménas hostage-taking ====
On 16 January 2013, in the In Aménas hostage crisis, members of Belmokhtar's new brigade attacked the Tiguentourine gas field near In Aménas, Algeria, and took more than 800 hostages. He justified the attack as a reprisal for the French intervention that had begun in Mali days before.

Algerian forces made an assault and rescued hundreds of hostages. During the conflict, at least 39 hostages were killed, some executed with a bullet to the head by the Brigade. Algerian special forces killed 29 members of the Brigade and captured three, according to the Algerian government. In a video, Belmokhtar claimed responsibility for the attack, saying: "We are behind the blessed daring operation in Algeria... We did it for al-Qaida".

British Special Air Service and Special Reconnaissance Regiment special forces, French special forces, and American units were mobilised to locate Belmokhtar. A bounty of $100,000 was placed on his head.

French and Chadian forces killed Abou Zeid in northern Mali on 25 February 2013. His death was confirmed by several sources.

=== May 2013 attacks ===
Belmokhtar claimed responsibility for another terrorist attack on 23 May 2013. In this attack, a French-owned uranium mine in Arlit, Niger, as well as a military base 150 miles away in Agadez, were attacked by suicide bombers with truck bombs. Experts saw no reason to doubt the claim of responsibility. Anouar Boukhars of the Carnegie Endowment for International Peace saw the bombing as retaliation for the earlier French intervention in the Northern Mali conflict.

In June 2013, the U.S. government announced a "$5 million reward for information leading to his location".

In August 2013 a communique on the Mauritanian news agency ANI announced the fusion of Belmokhtar's group with MUJAO, another Al Qaida offshoot to form the Al Mourabitoun group. In May 2015, a portion of the group pledged allegiance to the Islamic State of Iraq and the Levant (ISIL); however, Belmokhtar, who had repeatedly pledged allegiance to Al Qaeda leader Ayman al-Zawahri, issued a statement rejecting this change of allegiance.

=== 2015 Bamako hotel attack ===
On 20 November 2015, France named him likely responsible for the 2015 Bamako hotel attack.

== Reports of death ==
On 2 March 2013, Chadian state television and the Chadian Army reported that Belmokhtar had been killed in a raid by Chadian troops against a terrorist base in the Adrar de Ifhogas mountains in north Mali. The report was not confirmed by other sources. It was refuted by Al Qaeda members on 4 March 2013. A spokesman for Belmokhtar's unit also denied he was killed.

On 14 April, Chadian president Idriss Déby Itno restated his previous claim that the army killed Belmokhtar, saying he blew himself up in despair after learning about the death of Abou Zeïd. French officials were not so sure, and were planning to conduct DNA tests.

On 23 May 2013, Belmokhtar issued a statement confirming the death of Abou Zeid, contradicting Chadian claims of Belmokhtar's death.

On 14 June 2015, Libya's government announced Belmokhtar was killed in a U.S. airstrike inside Libya. However, there is no known confirmation that Mokhtar Belmokhtar was killed. U.S. officials confirmed the strike and that Belmokhtar was a target, but did not immediately confirm that Belmokhtar was killed. Libya Herald reported that seven leading members of Libya's Ansar Al-Sharia, including Belmokhtar, were killed in the airstrike outside Ajdabiya. Ansar al-Sharia named seven people it said were killed in the airstrike, but denied Belmokhtar was among them.

Belmokhtar was removed from the U.S. State Department's Rewards for Justice list in January 2016.

Based on intelligence from the United States, in November 2016, Belmokhtar was again targeted in an airstrike conducted by French aircraft in southern Libya.

In September 2021, al-Qaeda leader Ayman al-Zawahiri announced in a book that Belmokhtar had become a "martyr" but did not say when he was killed.

== Alternate names and sobriquets ==
Mokhtar Belmokhtar was also known by the following names: Abu Khaled, Bal'ur, al-Aouer, Khalid Abu al-Abbas, The One-Eyed, The Prince, Laaouar, The Uncatchable, Mr. Marlboro, and MBM. "Abu Khaled" is the nom de guerre used by AQIM. Belmokhtar was nicknamed "one-eyed" in reference to his missing eye and "Mr. Marlboro" due to his running a massive Marlboro cigarette-smuggling operation. Previously, Belmokhtar was also known as the Commander or Emir of the Ninth Region (Algerian Desert).
