= Marta (given name) =

- Gender: female

Origin
- Origin: Akkadian, Hebrew, Roman
- Meaning: Akkadian: "the daughter"; Hebrew: "the lady"; Roman: "dedicated to Mars"
- Region of origin: Mediterranean

Marta is a female given name derived from the Aramaic name ܡܳܪܬܳܐ (Mârtâ, in Syriac script, מָרְתָא in Hebrew script), which translates as "the lady" in English. It had the male form "Martinus" in Roman culture. It has been described as a cognate of Martha.

The name Marta should not be confused with the similar-looking Swedish name Märta, which derives from the Greek name Margaret and means "pearl".

== People with the given name ==
- Marta Abba (1900–1988), Italian stage actress
- Marta Acosta, American fiction novelist
- Marta Adams (1891–1978) German-born painter, sculptor
- Marta Andrino (born 1987), Portuguese actress
- Marta Axser-Itope (born 1987), Namibian politician
- Marta Balletbò-Coll (born 1960), Spanish actress and film director
- Marta Bassino (born 1996), Italian alpine skier
- Marta Batinović (born 1990), Croatian-Montenegrin handball player
- Marta Bunge (1938–2022), Argentine-Canadian mathematician
- Marta Camps Arbestain, New Zealand soil scientist
- Marta Cartabia (born 1963), Italian judge
- Marta Civil, American mathematics educator
- Marta Crawford (born 1969), Portuguese psychologist and author
- Marta Damkowski (1911–1979), German activist and politician
- Marta Díaz (born 2000), Spanish celebrity, businesswoman and model
- Marta Domachowska (born 1986), Polish tennis player
- Marta Domingo (born 1935), Mexican soprano and opera director
- Marta Domínguez (born 1975), Spanish track and field runner
- Marta Drpa (born 1989), Serbian volleyball player
- Marta DuBois (1952–2018), Panamanian actress
- Marta Dusseldorp (born 1973), Australian actress and producer
- Marta Eggerth (1912–2013), Hungarian singer and actress
- Márta Fábián (born 1946), Hungarian musician
- Marta Fascina (born 1990), Italian politician
- Marta Ferri (born 1984), Italian fashion designer
- Marta Feuchtwanger (1891–1987), German-American curator
- Marta Fitzgerald, former spouse of Rush Limbaugh
- Marta Gabriel, Polish musician
- Marta Gardolińska (born 1988), Polish conductor
- Marta García, multiple people
- Marta Francés Gómez (born 1995), Spanish paratriathlete
- Marta Hazas (born 1977), Spanish actress
- Marta Hidy (1927–2010), Hungarian-Canadian violinist, conductor and music teacher
- Marta Huerta de Aza (born 1990), Spanish football referee
- Marta Israelowa (1905–c. 1967), German politician
- Marta Jandová (born 1974), Czech musician
- Marta Jimenez (born 1974), Spanish philosopher and professor
- Marta Kaczmarek (born 1955), Polish-born Australian actress
- Márta Károlyi (born 1942), Romanian gymnastics coach
- Marta Kauffman (born 1956), American writer and TV producer
- Marta Klonowska (born 1964), Polish glass maker
- Marta Kostyuk (born 2002), Ukrainian tennis player
- Marta Kristen (born 1945), Norwegian-born American actress; (Lost In Space)
- Márta Kurtág (1927–2019), Hungarian pianist and music pedagogue
- Marta Laan (born 1985), Estonian actress
- Márta Lacza (born 1946), Hungarian graphic artist and portrait painter
- Marta Maggetti (born 1996), Italian windsurfer
- Marta Marrero (born 1983), Spanish former tennis player
- Marta Menegatti (born 1990), Italian beach volleyball player
- Marta Míguez (born 1973), Spanish former javelin thrower
- Marta Minujín (born 1943), Argentine artist
- Marta Nawrocka (born 1986), First Lady of Poland-elect
- Marta Nieto (born 1982), Spanish actress
- Marta Pagnini (born 1991), Italian rhythmic gymnast
- Marta Ortega Pérez (born 1984), Spanish businesswoman
- Marta Pessarrodona (born 1941), Spanish writer
- Marta Peterson, musician in the band Bleeding Through
- Marta Rădulescu (1912–1959), Romanian novelist
- Marta Robežniece (born 2005), Latvian luger
- Marta Rosique (born 1996), Spanish politician
- Marta Roure (born 1981), Andorran singer and actress
- Marta Russell (1951–2013), American journalist
- Marta Rzewuska-Frankowska (1889–1954), Polish anthropologist, educator
- Marta Sahagún (born 1953), Mexican politician
- Marta Salogni, Italian record producer, mixer and recording engineer
- Marta Sánchez (born 1966), Spanish pop singer
- Marta Sandal (1878–1930), Norwegian singer
- Márta Sebestyén (born 1957), Hungarian folk singer
- Marta Segarra (born 1963), Spanish philologist, university professor, and researcher
- Marta Sillaots (1887–1969), Estonian writer, translator, and literary critic
- Marta (footballer), Marta Vieira da Silva, (born 1986), Brazilian women's football player
- Marta Stępień (born 1994), Canadian model
- Marta Suplicy (born 1945), Brazilian politician and psychologist
- Márta Svéd (1910–2005), Hungarian mathematician who moved to Australia in 1939
- Marta Tchai, stage name of Marta Bigeriego, Spanish composer, singer, dancer and actress
- Marta Tomac (born 1990), Croatian-Norwegian handball player
- Marta Torrejón (born 1990), Spanish footballer
- Marta Trivi (born 1988), Spanish journalist
- Marta Tufet, British public health researcher
- Marta Vannucci (1921–2021), Brazilian biologist
- Marta Moreno Vega (born 1942), Puerto Rican scholar, researcher, and artist associated with El Museo del Barrio
- Marta Xargay (born 1990), Spanish basketball player

== Fictional characters ==
- Marta Estrella, from the television show Arrested Development
