= École alsacienne =

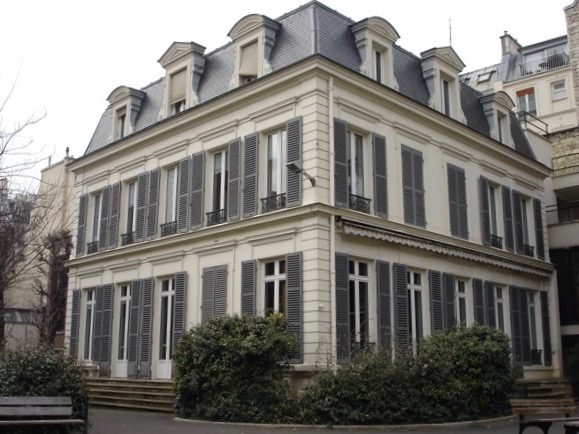

Location
- 109, rue Notre-Dame-des-Champs, Paris; France
- Coordinates: 48°50′28″N 2°20′02″E

Information
- Type: Private school
- Motto: Ad nova tendere sueta (Towards novelty from tradition)
- Established: 1874
- Principal: Pierre de Panafieu
- Website: https://www.ecole-alsacienne.org/

The École alsacienne is a co-educational private school located in the 6th arrondissement of Paris.

The school was founded by a group of French Alsatians after the French defeat in the Franco-Prussian War. It then became a model for reforming the school system under the Third Republic.

== History ==
The school was first started in 1871 in the Rue de l'École, for a dozen students, under the direction of an Alsatian instructor, M. Braeunig. Three years later the official École alsacienne, a school for secondary education, opened on Avenue Vavin (84-86 rue d'Assas), under the direction of M. Rieder, a graduate of the École normale supérieure who had started has pedagogical career in Strasbourg. The school was staffed by teachers and Protestant academics from Alsace who came to France after the annexation of Alsace-Lorraine by Germany during the Franco-Prussian War.

The new school was an establishment for secondary education based on the model of the Jean Sturm Gymnasium, with the ambition of "producing a type of man who was cultivated, and combines the virtues of the regional soul with the general qualities of the humanist". The two first headmasters of the school were Frédéric Rieder (from 1874 to 1891) and Théodore Beck (from 1891 to 1922). Both were pastors, though the school was officially religiously neutral. Among the ten or so members of the first administrative board were no more than three Catholics, and from the beginning the school had, according to historian André Encrevé, a clear Protestant flavor. Serving, at first, the Alsatian community exiled in Paris, the school hearkened back to the methods taught at the gymnasium in Strasbourg but, at the same time, wanted for those students from Mulhouse and Strasbourg to "train their souls to be French", in the words of Beck. Very progressive in a country where educational reform was slow, it was one of the first coeducational schools, and one of the first French schools with a kindergarten, and education was "secular, rigorous, with high academic standards". It soon expanded to have non-Alsatian teachers and students.

The school rapidly became one of the testing grounds for public education, known as a "pilot school".

Running from kindergarten to the final year, the École alsacienne is one of the most reputable schools in Paris. Students from the École alsacienne often come from amongst the most privileged sectors of society, due to their selection and admission policies, and its geographic location. However, thanks to its scholarship system and due to the limited price of admission, it has maintained a relative social diversity, with strong attendance from the middle class. The establishment offers relatively few integrated places, as many students stay there throughout their school life. The admissions are mainly made in 6th Form (beginning of middle school), as more than half of the student body is admitted at this time. The school considered opening an establishment in Argenteuil, but the project never took place, due to lack of public investment.

== Teaching ==
=== General ===
Since the 2000s, the school has offered exchange programs with partner schools that include Beijing Jingshan School, Sydney Grammar School, Theresianum Akademie, Daly College, St. Paul's School (New Hampshire), Maru A Pula School, Hotchkiss School, The Dalton School, Lakefield College School, Ashbury College.

=== Cost ===
As the establishment is a private school, education is paid for 912 euros per trimester; there are also scholarships. Entrance is selective: in 2014, there were 300 applications for entry to the 6th Form, for 60 places.

== Lycée ranking ==
In 2015, the lycée was ranked 12th of 109 at departmental level in terms of teaching quality, and 130th at national level. The ranking was based on three criteria: baccalauréat results, the proportion of students who obtain their baccalauréat having studied at the school for their last two years, and "added value" (calculated based on the social origin of students, their age, and their diploma results). The Ecole alsacienne is ranked 7th in Paris, and 11th nationwide for 2020.

== Notable former pupils ==
=== A ===
- Paul Ackerman
- Catherine Allégret
- Jean Claude Ameisen
- Gabriel Attal
- Axel Auriant
- Jean-Christophe Averty

=== B ===
- Élisabeth Badinter
- Édouard Baer
- Nathalie Baye
- Pierre Bellemare
- Jean-Paul Belmondo
- Pervenche Berès
- Nicolas Berggruen
- Olivier Berggruen
- Adrien Bertrand
- Raphaële Billetdoux
- Nino Boccara
- Marc Boegner
- Jean de Boishue
- Alain Bombard
- Michel Boujenah
- Emmanuel Bove
- Jean Brachet
- Juan Branco
- Thierry Breton
- Jean de Brunhoff
- Denis Buican
- Michel Butel
- Agnès Buzyn

=== C ===
- Carlos
- Benjamin Castaldi
- Jean-Baptiste Charcot
- Gilles Clavreul

=== D ===
- Thomas Dutronc

=== F ===
- Delphine Forest
- Pascal Vitali Fua

=== G ===
- Laurent Gaudé
- André Gide
- Stanislas Guerini

=== H ===
- Laurens Hammond
- Marina Hands
- Christian Herter
- Stéphane Hessel
- Izïa Higelin

=== I ===
- Marc Iselin
- Jacques Isorni

=== J ===
- Alexandre Jardin
- Joyce Jonathan
- Jul

=== K ===
- Wilfrid Kilian
- Oan Kim

=== L ===
- Jean-Yves Lafesse
- Pierre Louÿs

=== M ===
- Elli Medeiros
- Marc Minkowski
- Henry de Monfreid
- Jérôme Monod
- Théodore Monod
- Vincent Moscato

=== P ===
- Jean-Jacques Pauvert
- Gilles Pélisson
- Guillaume Pepy
- Francis Perrin
- Michel Piccoli
- Frédéric Pottecher

=== R ===
- Patrick de Rousiers
- Emmanuel Roman

=== S ===
- Arthur Sadoun
- Léa Salamé
- Claude Sarraute
- Georges Scott
- Michel Seydoux
- Benjamin Siksou
- Sacha Sperling
- Peter Stackpole

=== W ===
- Sonia Wieder-Atherton

=== Z ===
- Marie-Cécile Zinsou

== Gallery ==
École

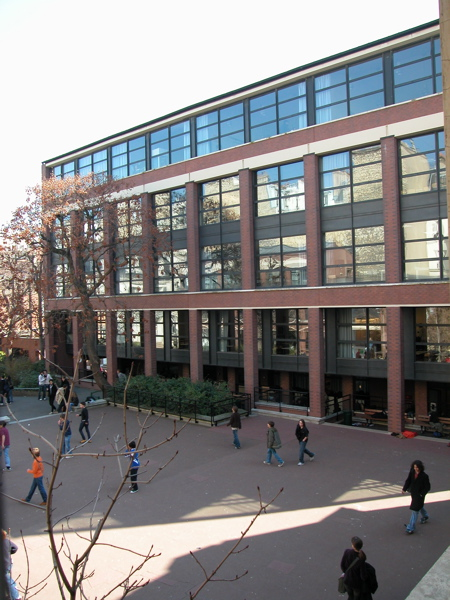
Building 1 and the courtyard of the 6th and 5th

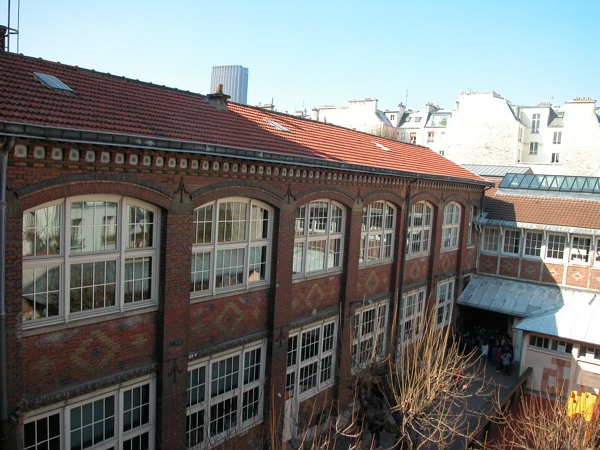
The Auburtin building

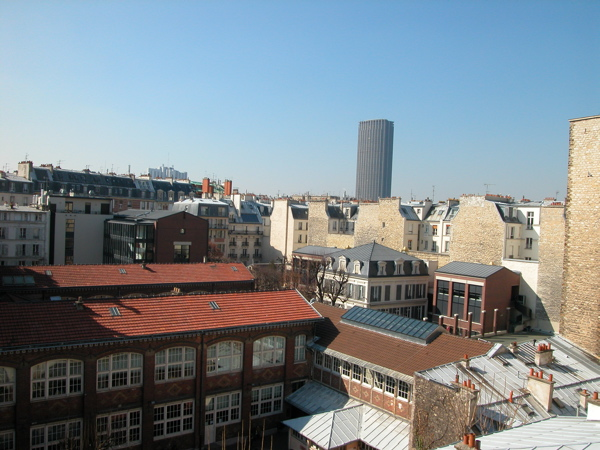
View of the school from the terrace of 128, rue d'Assas

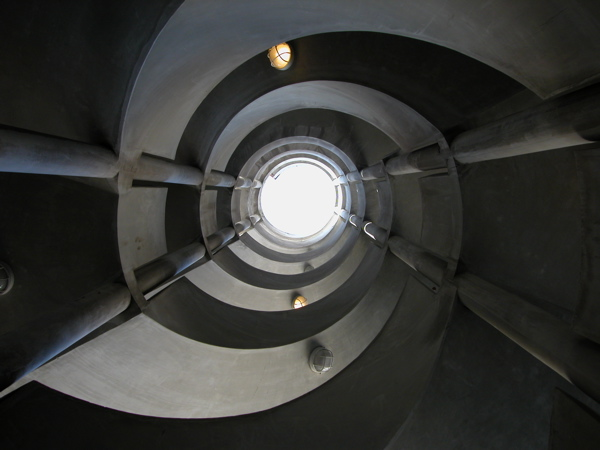
Stairs from the basement of Philippe Bosseau

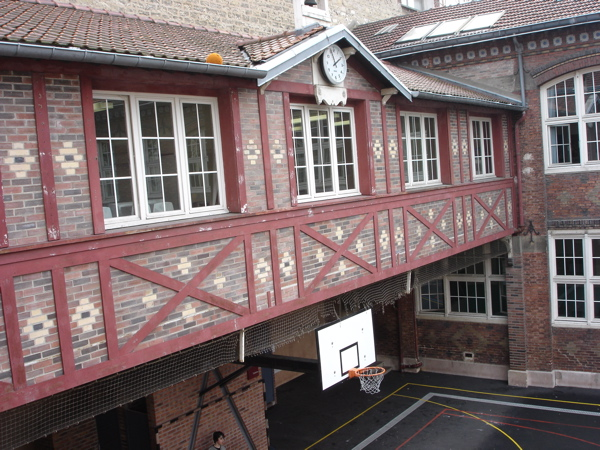
Auburtin building, next to the IT lab

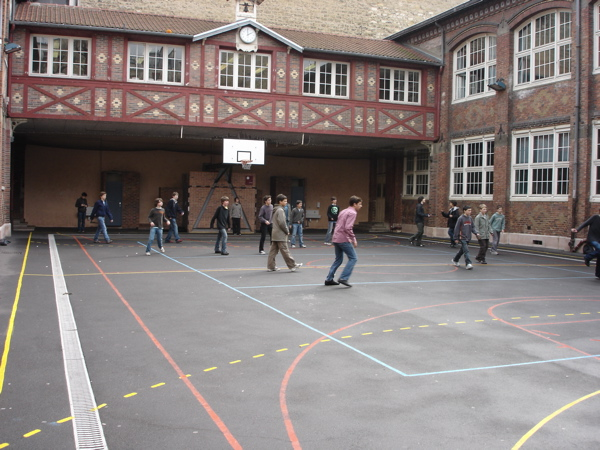
Sports court

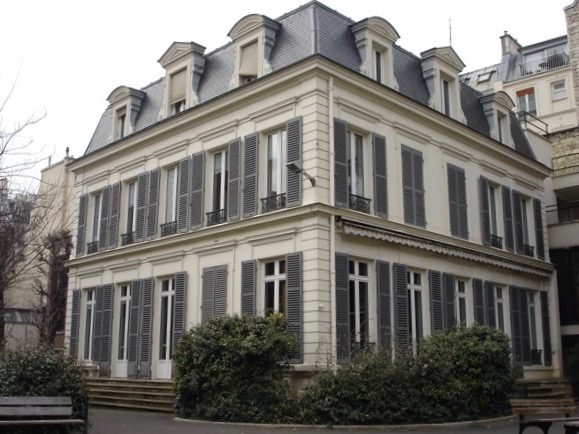
« La Maison blanche, 107, rue Notre-Dame-des-Champs, bought in 1973, used as a headmaster's office

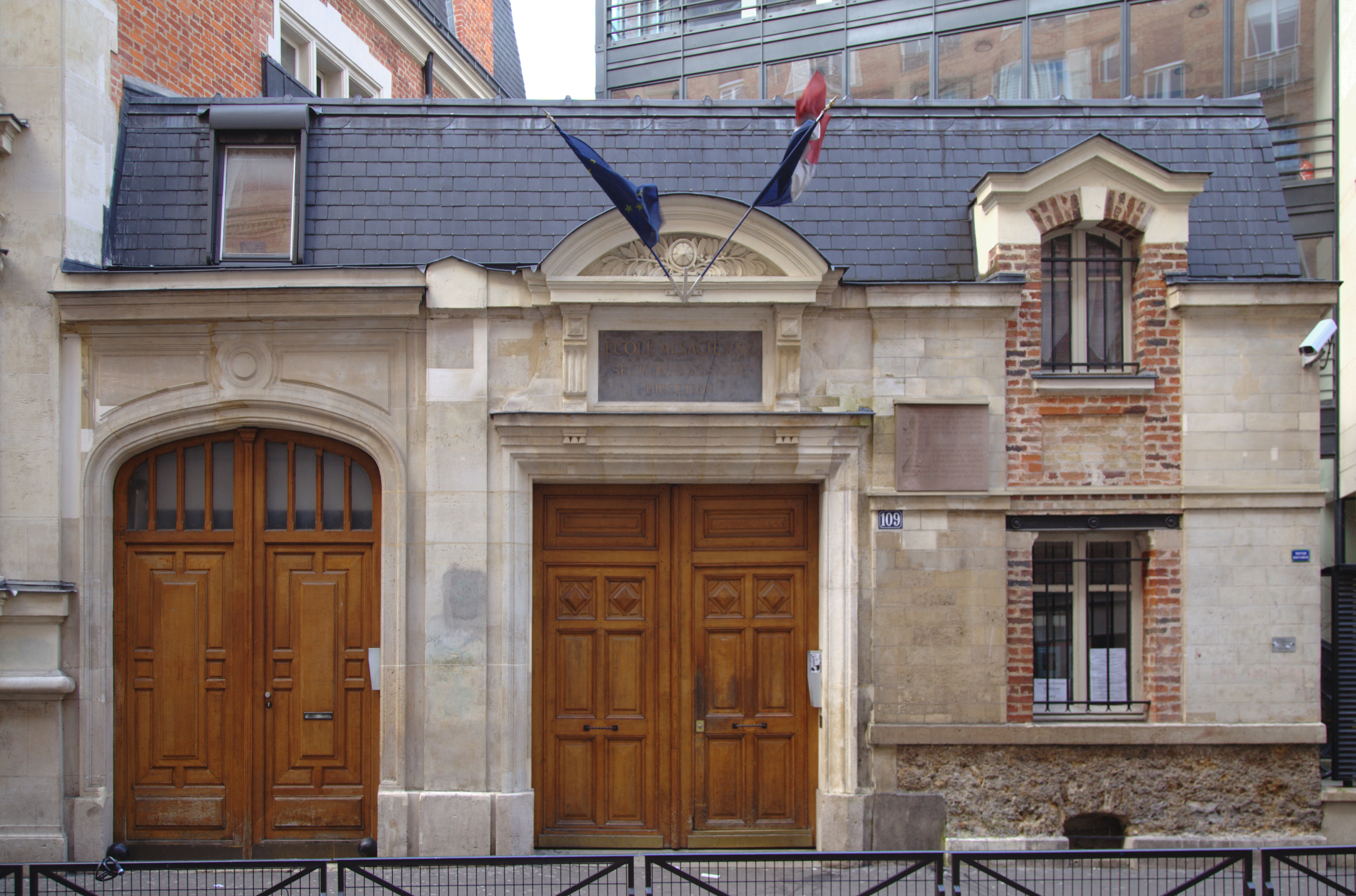
Entrance of 109, rue Notre-Dame-des-Champs

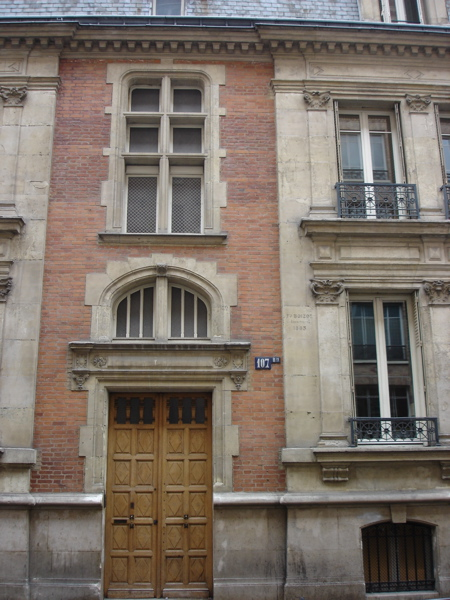
Entrance of 107 bis, rue Notre-Dame-des-Champs

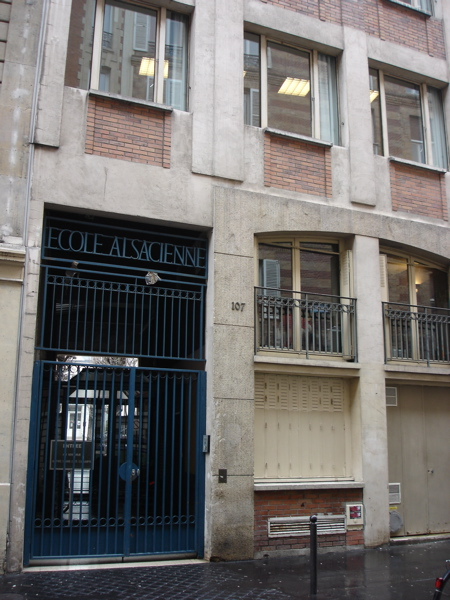
Entrance of 107, rue Notre-Dame-des-Champs

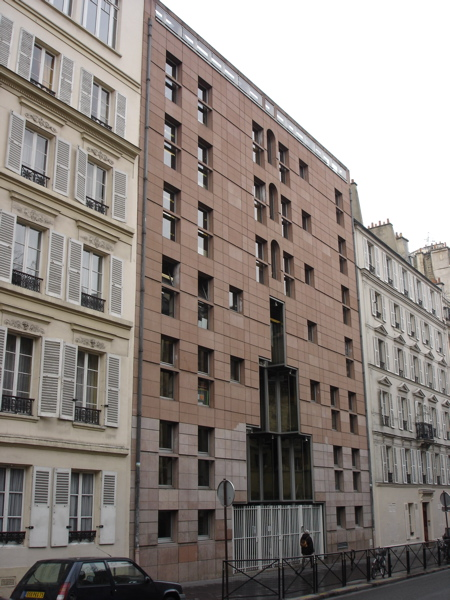
Entrance of 128, rue d'Assas

== Bibliography ==
- Allier, Jacques (1975). "Les origines de l'École alsacienne". Bulletin de la Société de l'histoire du protestantisme. 121: 100–112. JSTOR 24294800.
- Avrand-Margot, Sylvia (1998). "Musique à l'école : éducation musicale à l'école alsacienne (Paris)". La Lettre du musicien: 208.
- Cinquantenaire de l'École alsacienne. Paris [1924]
- École alsacienne, Paris: Inauguration des nouveaux bâtiments. Paris: Cerf, 1881
- L'École alsacienne, Les Saisons d'Alsace, 1994
- Georges Hacquard, Histoire d'une institution française: l'École alsacienne
  - vol. 1: Naissance d'une école libre 1871-1891. Paris: Garnier, 1982
  - vol. 2: L'école de la légende 1891-1922. preface by Jean Bruller. Paris: Suger, 1987
  - vol. 3: La tradition à l'épreuve 1922-1953
  - vol. 4: L'école du contrat 1953-1986
- Gabriel Monod, Les réformes de l'enseignement secondaire et l'École alsacienne. Paris, 1886
- Maurice Testard, Une belle école. Histoire anecdotique préfilmée de l'École alsacienne, preface by Vercors. Paris: Vigot frères, 1950
