= Order of Watchers =

French prayer community

Founder
- Wilfred Monod

Regions with significant populations
- France, Switzerland and Belgium

Religions
- Protestant

Languages
- French

Website
- https://fraternitespirituelledesveilleurs.com

The Order of Watchers (Fraternité spirituelle des Veilleurs, formerly Tiers-Ordre des Veilleurs, in French) is a prayer community founded in 1923 within French Protestantism by the Reformed pastor Wilfred Monod. Initially, it was named the "Third Order" of Watchers. Its name refers to a word of Jesus to his disciples in the Gospel of Matthew 26:41: "Watch and pray".

== History ==
=== Vision ===
Wilfred Monod, son of a pastor and member of the Monod family, marked by the Protestant Réveil, destined himself very early to the pastoral ministry. He entered the Faculty of Theology in Montauban in 1888. In his memoirs, he describes the extent to which the discovery of the atmosphere that reigned there was a shock for him: he perceived a significant moral and spiritual slackening among the young students.

His career as a pastor, then as a professor of theology, was marked by the concern to offer his parishioners, his students and his colleagues a discipline of prayer and life. Prayer groups and publications gave substance to this vision.

Even before the war, when he was the pastor in Paris at the Oratoire du Louvre, he was thinking of a more ambitious project. Thus, in a talk in 1913: "Oh, I dream of a lay third order - so to speak - intended to promote and protect the evangelical social ideal in our churches!". The figure of Francis of Assisi fascinated him, and he saw an inspiring model in the Third Order of Saint Francis.

World War I made this project more urgent: "the blood of the soldiers killed by the millions screamed, day and night, like the blood of Abel; it demanded, it demanded a Christian Christianity".

=== Founding ===
In the summer of 1922, one of Wilfred Monod's sons - Theodore, the future famous naturalist and botanist - brought him a rule project. After a few simplifications, a constitutive text was drawn up and, on 20 April 1923, a dozen or so members joined the "Third Order" of Watchmen.

From the beginning, Wilfred Monod insists on putting "Third Order" in inverted commas to remind us that he is not referring to any monastic order. Likewise, the figure of Francis of Assisi is given a certain amount of discretion and is preferred to that of Peter Waldo, more acceptable in the Protestant world.

But the aim remains. The Franciscan spirit is found in the three words of the order of the Watchers, which - according to Monod - reflect above all the spirit of the Beatitudes pronounced by Jesus: "Joy, simplicity, mercy". By cultivating inner silence, by uniting prayer and action, by being "in solidarity with the whole Church and the world itself", it is a matter of "living an ordinary life in an extraordinary way".

=== Development ===
Wilfred Monod remained in charge of the Watchers ("prior") until 1942, shortly before his death. He was succeeded by Pastor Georges-François Grosjean, and in 1974 by Pastor Roger Belmont.

In 1991, Daniel Bourguet took over this responsibility. A theologian and pastor, he wrote numerous works marked by meditation on the Bible and the spirituality of the Church Fathers. In particular, he developed the notion of "interiorised monasticism", borrowed from the Russian thinker Paul Evdokimov. Driven by a monastic vocation, he has lived since 2002 as a hermit in the Cévennes.

After a long decline, the Fraternity experienced new growth: 200 members in 2005, 300 in 2007, and more than 400 in 2018. Since 2012, Claude Caux-Berthoud, a pastor of the United Protestant Church of France, has been the sixth prior of the community.

== Commitments of the Watchers ==
=== Daily prayer ===
The Watchers do not propose a community life, but a communion of prayer. The Watchers' Rule commits them to live "three moments for the essential". These are times set aside each day for prayer, in communion with other Watchers. No particular office or liturgy is imposed. Each Watcher is free to use the manuals, publications or daily reading lists in use in his or her church, and to organise this time according to what suits him or her and what is possible.

This rhythm of three daily prayer times is not new. Traces of it can be found in Jewish prayer as attested by the writings of the Old Testament (Daniel 6:11, and perhaps Psalm 55:18). The Christian tradition has taken it up, and among the Reformers John Calvin recommends it. For his part, Wilfred Monod refers it to the Angelus, whose ringing of bells heard one evening in 1922 upset him: "what an unspeakable power of poetry and solidarity in such an oration, binding together unknown personalities, unknown to each other".

The Rule specifies the nature of these three times of prayer:

- In the morning: meditative reading of the Bible, praise and prayer.
- In the middle of the day: elevation, in communion with the Watchers and members of other communities, in the recitation - aloud if possible - of the Beatitudes. This can also be done internally, anywhere; or with the family, at lunchtime for example.
- In the evening: look back on the day, ask for and receive forgiveness, give thanks, and praise.

=== Friday and Sunday ===
Meditation on the Passion and Resurrection of Christ is recommended every week on days that evoke these events. The figure of Christ is central to the spirituality of the Watchers, and should provoke a spiritual and social conversion in everyone. Thus:

- "In homage to the Crucified-Resurrected, the Watchers evoke, every Friday, in recollection, the Cross of Calvary, God's gift par excellence to humanity for its salvation. This homage can also take a practical turn: material or spiritual help, special intercessions, letters, visits, etc. Some Watchers will even observe a partial or total fast.
- "The Watchers rejoices on Sunday, for it is the "Lord's day", the day of the resurrection and the day when the Spirit descended upon the disciples to make them witnesses of the Resurrected-Glorified. Unless he is really prevented from doing so, he will therefore join his brothers in public worship.

=== Meeting and retreats ===
In addition to the individual prayer commitment, meetings are recommended so that the Watchers can deepen their call, their vocation, and forge bonds of fraternal communion within the Fraternity:

- Meetings planned locally, most often on a regional scale
- An annual general meeting, open to all the Watchers
- Spiritual retreats, most often proposed on a regional level for a period of three days; these silent retreats give a great deal of space to the meditation of the biblical Scriptures, and are most often hosted in monasteries. According to Wilfred Monod, "public worship does not replace the desert, that is, the solitude where one withdraws to listen to the God who calls".

== Organisation of the Fraternity ==
=== Members ===
From their foundation, the Watchers have been men and women, pastors and worshippers from the Protestant tradition. Today, while maintaining its Protestant identity, the Fraternity also welcomes Catholic and Orthodox Christians.

Those who wish to become members begin with a period of novitiate, which ends on 31 December of the year following that of affiliation. This time of apprenticeship is spent in a personal relationship with a godfather or godmother. If necessary, it is followed by the status of observer.

The commitment is then reiterated each year; it is formalised by the signing of a membership card, in discernment and personal prayer. The regional meetings at the beginning of the year or the general meeting include the reiteration of the community's principles and the confirmation of commitments.

=== Structure and responsibilities ===
The Fraternity of Watchers is today mainly represented in French-speaking Europe. It is structured in about ten regions, including Belgium and Switzerland.

The leadership is assumed by a prior, in communion with a council composed of the regional leaders and their deputies. The prior is not elected, but receives a vocation from his predecessor in agreement with the council.

A quarterly bulletin, Veillez, has been published since the origins of the Fraternity and is distributed to all members and to those who request it. It contains articles and testimonies from members of the Fraternity, information on the dates of regional and national meetings, and a list of Bible verses to accompany the Friday tribute.

An associative structure governed by the French law of 1901 deals with material matters: the Association de Gestion des Veilleurs.

There is no salaried staff. The expenses of the Fraternity are covered by the free donations of the members.

=== Relationships ===
A pastor who was strongly involved in the early days of the ecumenical movement, Wilfred Monod did not want the Watchers to be a community apart from the Church, but rather at the heart of the Church, and sensitive to its diversity and universality. Monod is also a fervent promoter of a Christian social commitment. The Rule of the Watchers underlines this:

"The Watcher is in solidarity with the whole Church and the world itself, he does not detach himself from it. As a member of the body of Christ, he attends the worship service of his parish. He wants to be - discreetly and humbly - the praying and acting soul of the Church and to be so with others (communities and individuals). In this way he contributes to building it up locally and uniting it ecumenically".

Since 2010 the Spiritual Fraternity of the Watchers is a member of the French Protestant Federation and participates in its Department of Communities.

== Spiritual outreach ==
=== Protestant communities ===
The spirit of the Watchers, the centrality of the Beatitudes and its motto "joy, simplicity, mercy" have directly inspired several Protestant communities born after World War II.

- In May 1927, a Watcher, Antoinette Butte, met Wilfred Monod to help her discern her vocation. He put her in touch with Diane de Watteville, another Watcher, and soon a place of spiritual welcome and retreat was created in Saint-Germain-en-Laye. From this experience, the Pomeyrol Community was born in 1951.
- In the 1930s, Geneviève Micheli - a parishioner of Wilfred Monod at the Oratoire du Louvre in Paris - and the women who were to found the Grandchamp community had important links with Wilfred Monod, and all of them were Watchers. In 1938, Monod came to Grandchamp for a retreat.
- In 1944, Roger Schutz, later founder of the Taizé Community, wrote an Introduction to Community Life for what was then called the Evangelical Reformed Community of Cluny. The book is steeped in the meditation of the Beatitudes, and quotes Wilfred Monod several times. Elsewhere, Schutz writes: "In order to show solidarity with the Watchers, we have reworked our last Rule, which was of Franciscan importance, and we have gone so far as to use their expressions in the hope of linking ourselves on one point to a tradition which is certainly very new, but which is a response to one of the present needs of the Church. He wrote the little text that would become for Taizé, Pomeyrol and Grandchamp a summary of the Community Rule:

Pray and work that He may reign

Let your day's work and rest be enlivened by the Word of God

Maintain in all things the inner silence to abide in Christ

Penetrate yourself with the Spirit of the Beatitudes: Joy, Simplicity, Mercy

=== A figure: Theodore Monod ===
Wilfred Monod's son, Theodore Monod, played an important role in the foundation and support of the Watchers' Fraternity. A figure who has become a media figure, he has also been a singular witness.

At the age of twenty, he gave his father a document in which, he wrote, "I listed a certain number of decisions that I had taken personally to orient my life". This was the occasion and the basis for the foundation of the Third Order.

Very quickly called upon by the National Museum of Natural History to undertake numerous trips and missions throughout the world, he established a faithful correspondence with the Watchers, anxious to enlighten and support his companions. In 1927, while meditating in front of Charles de Foucauld's hermitage in the Hoggar, he exclaimed: "I found in the archives of the Tamanrasset post a large typewritten notebook in which Charles de Foucauld had drawn up the statutes of a brotherhood which is a sort of third order, open to all, lay people, single or not, ecclesiastics: there are pages inspired by the purest spirit of St. Francis, on humility, poverty, the sanctity of work, which would deserve to be known one day and which would be especially useful to the Watchers".

In 1925, in Cameroon, he wrote the Livre de prière des Veilleurs (Prayer Book of the Watchers), which was used for a long time in the Fraternity. In it, he proposed prayers for the three daily moments of recollection, which he called the offices of the light, the flame and the perfume, as well as liturgies for various other occasions.

Faithful all his life to his youthful commitment, he recites the Beatitudes daily in Greek (the original language of the New Testament). His life ethic, his relationships and his commitments testify to a personal appropriation of the main elements of the Watchers' Rule that opens to the universal.

The Friday tribute recommended by the Watchers becomes for him, for example, the occasion for a weekly fast of twenty-four hours, about which he confides: "Friday pleases me, because it is also the sacred day of Islam, which allows me to evoke my Muslim brothers, just as we found ourselves associated with them during the Algerian war, when Louis Massignon organised fasts for peace. The results of what we do are not always very visible, but I believe that the little we can do, and I add the very little we can do for peace, (...) we must do it all the same".

== See also ==
- Wilfred Monod
- Theodore Monod
- Taizé Community
- Pomeyrol Community
