= Foundation for Political Innovation =

French think tank

- Fondation pour l'innovation politique
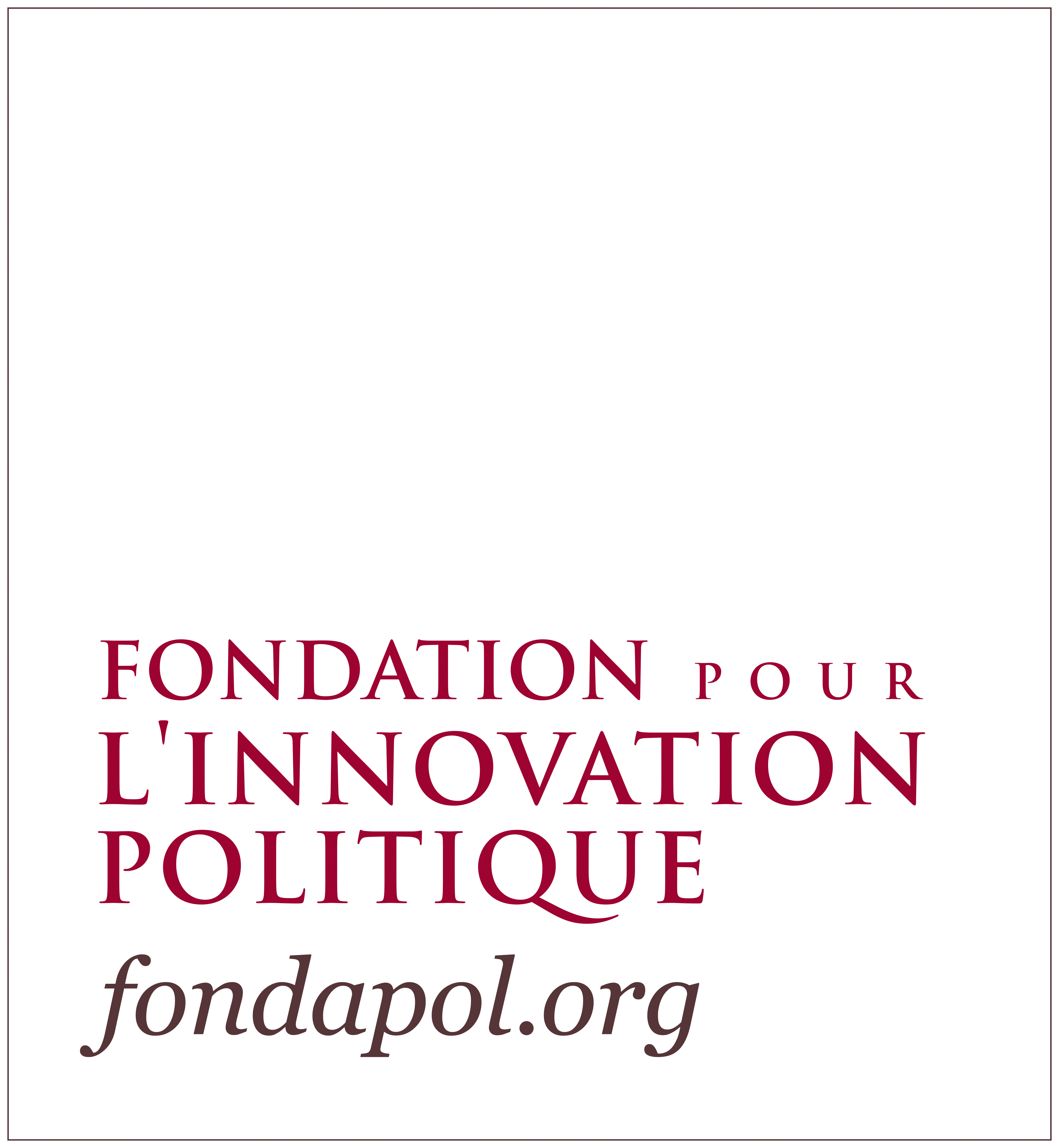
- Formation: 2004
- Type: Political and economic think tank
- Legal status: Recognised as a public interest organisation
- Headquarters: Paris, France
- Location: 11 rue de Grenelle, 75007 Paris
- Managing Director: Dominique Reynié
- Key people: Jérôme Monod, Founder, Nicolas Bazire, President, Grégoire Chertok, Vice-President
- Budget: 1,467K € in 2016
- Website: www.fondapol.org

The Foundation for Political Innovation (French: Fondation pour l'innovation politique; Fondapol) is a French think tank created in 2004. Under the leadership of Dominique Reynié since 2008, it is part of a "liberal, progressive and European" perspective. The think tank considers itself independent and aims to promote political innovation regarding social, educational and European issues. Recognised as a public interest organisation, the Foundation presents itself as an independent space dedicated to expertise, reflection, and exchange, aiming to contribute to the pluralism of thought and the renewal of public debate.

== History ==
=== Creation of the foundation ===
The Foundation was created in 2004 on the initiative of Jérôme Monod, adviser to Jacques Chirac (former President of the French republic), with the support of the UMP (right-wing party). It was recognized of public interest by a public decree of the Prime Minister, Jean-Pierre Raffarin at the time, on April 15 of the same year.

Between 2004 and 2008, the executive director of the Foundation was by Franck Debié.

=== Appointment of Dominique Reynié as executive director ===
Since October 2008, the Foundation has been headed by Dominique Reynié, professor at Sciences Po, who affirms the "liberal, progressive and European" positioning of the Foundation. In 2009, Nicolas Bazire became Chairman of the Supervisory Board of the Foundation, a position he still holds today.

In 2010, the Foundation initiated the first Think Tank Forum, an event hosted at the Sorbonne, bringing together the main French think tanks around discussions on major societal issues. Two more editions will follow in 2011 and 2013.

In November 2013, the Foundation organized an event lasting twenty-four hours at the Maison de la Mutualité, around the theme "We are the Progress!". Over 170 speakers took turns speaking for 10 minutes, in the form of testimonials and proposals on major social issues.

== Research work and studies ==
The Foundation for Political Innovation organizes its research work around four main topics : economics growth, ecology, values and digital. Its work addresses, through these four genera topics, all major political, economic and social issues. It contributes to the public debate with studies, surveys, and by organising events (conferences, seminars).

=== Economics ===
In 2011, the Foundation proposes "12 ideas for 2012". Made for the presidential election, these recommendation are intended, according to the executive director of the Foundation, to "redefine a social project".

Concerning the economy, the Foundation advocates, in particular, the introduction a “golden rule” regarding the French fiscal policy, a reduction in taxation, a revival of privatizations, a reduction in health expenditure and the pursuit of the rule of non-replacement of one in two officials. According to the Foundation, and in line with its liberal stance, " the State is not meant to reduce inequalities" and should "give up some areas of competence" to the benefit of the private sector.

In 2015, the scientist Idriss Aberkane publishes for the Foundation a note on the economy of knowledge.

In 2016, jurists Sophie Vermeille, Mathieu Kohmann and Mathieu Luinaud publish a note under the title "A right for innovation and growth", in which they denounce a French law deemed "anachronistic", which condemns innovation and inefficient from an economic point of view.

The same year, the foundation publishes a note on public broadcasting restructuring, criticized by Mathieu Gallet, Radio France's managing director. In this note, Fondapol recommends that the public audiovisual sector should be reorganized around a lighter structure centered on the production and diffusion of cultural contents, differentiating it from private channels.

In April 2017, the Foundation offered to review the public debt's evaluation criteria and its implications, in comparison with the structure imposed by the Treaty of Maastricht. This text aims at changing the perception of the economic reality of a given country and at assessing its priorities in terms of public expenditures.

=== Society ===
The Foundation has published several notes and surveys on the middle classes and youth.

In 2011, the Foundation for Political Innovation publishes a major international survey on youth, revealing that barely 47% of French aged between 16 and 29 are satisfied with the time in which they live.

The study also reveals an intergenerational break between graduates and non graduates. To fight these fractures, the foundation recommends, among other things, facilitating young people's access to economic, social and political responsibilities, and the introduction of a tax system more in favour of young people.

In "12 Ideas for 2012", the Foundation is particularly in favor of the opening of marriage and adoption to same-sex couples and the selection at the entrance of the university.

In June 2018, the Foundation published the results of a poll study conducted by Ipsos about youth addictions. The Foundation presented "worrying" results pertaining to the consumption levels of tobacco, alcohol, cannabis, cocaine, porn, and video games, as well as the usage of screens for 14-24 year-olds. According to this study, 8% of youth would consume pornographic content every day, and over one young people out of ten would gamble at least once a week.

=== Technology and digital ===
Through a blog named Anthropotechnie, hosted by Elisabeth de Castex, the foundation studies more in depth the contribution of technologies to the field of health (telemedicine, big data, artificial intelligence, robotics or genomics).

In 2011, Eddy Fougier addresses for the Foundation the theme of resistance to new technologies, and movements denouncing “misguided” science, analyzing in particular the case of anti-GMOs.

In 2016, the Foundation publishes a study on blockchain under the title "blockchain or distributed trust".

On the subject of artificial intelligence, Serge Soudoplatoff published in 2018 for the foundation a note highlighting what he refers to as "the three major ruptures of 2011" which allowed the development of artificial intelligence: the introduction of a more sophisticated category of algorithms such as convolutional neural networks, the arrival on the market of low cost graphic processors capable of performing a large number of calculations, the availability of large databases correctly annotated, allowing a finer learning.

In a study on industrial robotization published in 2012, written by Robin Rivaton, the Foundation reveals that France is one of the European countries most hostile to robotization.

In 2017, Nicolas Bouzou and Christophe Marques published a note for the Foundation, on the theme "Hospital: liberating innovation", imagining the future of public health at the time of the NBIC (nanotechnologies, biotechnologies, big data and cognitive sciences).

In March 2018, the Foundation's Executive Officer, Dominique Reynié, defended medical digitalisation, in particular telemedicine, in order to efficiently combat the lack of doctors in certain regions of France.

=== Politics ===
Among the Foundation's political studies, you can find for instance studies dealing with the recomposition of the French political landscape., voters’ turnout and abstention, antinuclear and anti-GMO movements, the “zadiste” movement, extreme right movements, or populism.

In December 2016, in view of the presidential election, Fondapol participated in the launch of the participative site "Place de la santé", in partnership with the National Federation of French Mutuality and two other think tanks (the Jean Jaurès Foundation and Terra Nova). The objective is to understand the programs of the candidates and to feed the debate on the major issues of the health policy.

Also in 2016, academic Julien Darmon proposed 10 recommendations, in the name of the Foundation, to improve public policy in the fight against poverty. Among the proposed recommendations are the simplification of social prestations, digitalisation, or the poverty measurement indicators’ review.

In 2017, Fondapol publishes the results of an international survey (26 countries) on the evolution of the democratic sentiment and values in Europe under the title "Where is democracy going?". The conclusions of the survey underline that the main principles of liberal democracy are popular in all countries, but that to the same extent there is growing distrust of the institutions of democracy.

In 2017, the Foundation continued to explore the employment crisis in France and the way it is handled by public authorities. Pierre Pezzardi and Henri Verdier published a note entitled From State Start-ups to Platform State. Pezzardi and Verdier ponder the French State's current role in the fight against unemployment and job search, and on the way supply and demand work in the sector. Indeed, according to them, only 7% of job offers are dealt with by the dedicated State entity. A few months later, following this reflection, Faÿçal Hafied presents a series of proposals to reform the employment market. He develops two main ideas, first the easing of job termination conditions, and second the improvement of professional training and orientation.

Between 2017 and 2018, the Fondapol regularly discussed the French health system. Amongst these debates, lies the possibility to condition medical reimbursement to people's behaviour, the current quality of low cost medical equipment, or the total reimbursement of care in line with “responsible governance”.

=== Religion ===
Between 2014 and 2015, working closely with the Foundation for the Memory of Shoah, the Foundation led an international poll study in 31 countries on the 20th century's memory, in particular on Shoah, communism, and the world wars, and on the new generations’ perception of this issue. Over 30 000 young people from 16 to 29 were interviewed in 24 different languages for the study.

Between 2015 and 2017, Fondapol has been a partner of the seminar "States, Religions, Laïcités: the new fundamentalists, national and international challenges" of the Collège des Bernardins.

In 2014 then and 2017, it published in partnership with the American Jewish community an investigation on the perception of Jews by Muslims in France and on antisemitism.

In 2015, Fondapol launches a series of 11 studies entitled "Values of Islam". these studies are all written by Muslim contributors, and have been translated into Arabic. Topics include "Religious pluralism in Islam, or the consciousness of otherness", or "Women and Islam: a reformist vision".

In 2018, the lawyer Thierry Rambaud publishes for Fondapol a study entitled "Governing the religious in a secular state", on relations between the State and religious leaders, in which it recommends that public authorities first identify "essential values" that all citizens and all religions should respect.

=== Open Data ===
Through a dedicated platform, the Foundation makes available to the public the data collected during its various surveys.

== Awards ==
In 2017, The Global Go To Think Tank Index of the University of Pennsylvania's Think Tanks and Civil Societies Program ranks Fondapol 20th in the category "Best Think Tanks with a Political Party Affiliation" worldwide (the Foundation ranked 17th in 2014, 19th in 2015). and in 2016), and 50th best European think tank in all categories (46th in 2014, 19th in 2015 and in 2016). The foundation is the first French think tank with a political party affiliation of this ranking.

== Funding ==
Funded by the UMP when it was created in 2004, it has not received subsidies from any political party since 2005.

The Foundation for Political Innovation is recognized as being of public interest, and as such receives a grant from the Prime Minister.

Its resources are public, up to 74% in 2017 (79% en 2014 7), and private. The support of businesses and individuals also contributes to the development of its activities.

In 2012, the Foundation received 1.113.200 public subsidies 5. In 2017 this figure amounts to 1.440.000 euros.

== Governance ==
Since October 2008, the Foundation for Political Innovation is led by Dominique Reynié (Executive director), political scientist, professor at Sciences Po. Since 2009, the Supervisory Board's chairman has been Nicolas Bazire. To carry out its work, the foundation relies on a network of experts and specialists, and civil society actors.

== Supervisory Board ==
- Nicolas Bazire, President
- Grégoire Chertok, Vice-President
- Cyrille Bardon
- Valérie Bernis
- Aldo Cardoso
- Geneviève Férone
- Pierre Giacometti
- Changjian Jiang
- Olivier Labesse
- Anne Levade
- Francis Mer, Honorary President
- Tobie Nathan
- Jean-Claude Paye
- Sébastien Proto
- Salima Saa

=== Scientific Committee ===
- Christophe de Voogd, président
- Bernard Bachelier
- Bruno Bensasson
- Elisabeth de Castex
- Stéphane Courtois
- Julien Damon
- Laurence Daziano
- Marc Fornacciari
- Emmanuel Goldstein
- Luuk Van Middelaar
- Erwan le Noan
- Pascal Perrineau
- Xavier Quérat-Hément
- Robin Rivaton
- Alain-Gérard Slama

=== Audit Committee ===
- Jean Raynaud, Président
- Jean-Daniel Lévy
- Jacques Pradon

=== Ethics Committee ===
- Hélène Gisserot, Présidente
- Yves Cannac
- Dominique Latournerie

== Publications ==
Fondapol regularly publishes studies and surveys that it provides to Internet users as a free download. Every year since 2011, the Foundation publishes a collection of its main works under the title “Political Innovation”, published by Presses Universitaires de France.

It also broadcasts her work through two blogs, Trop Libre and Anthropotechnie.
