= Serge Soudoplatoff =

French technologist

Serge Soudoplatoff is an entrepreneur, commentator and author, noted for his ability to envision and explain technology trends, and to contextualise these for industry, government and corporations. He consults widely across English and French-speaking territories. In 2010 and 2012, technology magazine, '01net', nominated Soudoplatoff as one of France's top 100 influencers on the nation's digital economy. Serge created a logical explanation for the economy of abundance versus economy of scarcity known as "Soudoplatoff's law" : "When one share a tangible good, it divides. When one share an intangible good, it multiples".

Born in 1954, Serge graduated from L'Ecole Polytechnique, and in his early career worked as a cartographer, specializing in satellite positioning and remote sensing systems (Landsat and Navstar) and with IBM where he conducted research into speech recognition. Soudoplatoff then moved to Capgemini where he managed its Paris research centre and then to France Télécom, where he was the Director of Innovation, launching projects on mobility and the Internet, and IP telephony.

Since then, Soudoplatoff has become a public face of the Internet revolution, in particular, promoting the Internet-enabled paradigm peer-to-peer as an innovation strategy. He is responsible for developing Government 2.0 strategies, such as open-data, within Fondapol, the French think-tank for promoting innovative thinking in the political sphere; where is publishes notes.

Although an advocate for disruptive Internet-based production models such as co-creation, Soudoplatoff controversially accepted an invitation (2010) to work for Hadopi Labs, an arm of the French "Haute autorité", (a governmental regulatory commission) responsible for enacting the Hadopi Law, a restrictive law on downloading copyright material. Justifying his involvement, Soudoplatoff wrote, "as I am more a man of bridge than a man of wall, I found it a challenge to change things from inside Hadopi, rather than criticize it from the outside".

Soudoplatoff's first startup, 'HighDeal', was founded in the R&D labs of France Télécom in 1996, opened for business in California in 1999, and was sold to SAP in 2009. More recent projects include an open-source Virtual Worlds platform Vastpark, Scanderia which develops strategic digital games for business and education, and most recently he cofounded Mentia, a start-up which creates digital products for people with dementia. Soudoplatoff is also a strategic advisor to the virtual worlds analytics company, kzero. He teaches in Paris, at the European business school, ESCP, and the information and multi-media school HETIC, where he created the France's first course in the use and practice of virtual worlds.

Soudoplatoff's books include Avec Internet, où allons-nous? ("Where is the Internet Taking us?") (2004) and "Le Monde avec Internet:apprendre, travailler, partager et créer à l'ère numérique" ("The Internet World: learn, work, share and create in the digital age") (2012). Soudoplatoff has also written a satirical novel set in the enterprise world, La multinationale française (The French Multinational). Born in Paris, France, he currently resides in San Francisco, California.
