= Pomeyrol Community =

Protestant religious order

The Pomeyrol Community is a Protestant religious order founded in 1950 in Pomeyrol, in the commune of Saint-Étienne-du-Grès (Bouches du Rhône). The sisters of Pomeyrol are mainly dedicated to prayer and host spiritual, festive or theological retreats. This community of deaconesses, recognized as a religious community by the Reformed Church of France in 1953, is inspired by the movement of the "Third Order of the Watchers", launched by pastor Wilfred Monod, and by scouting.

== History ==
The creation of this community is due to Antoinette Butte (1898–1986), a committed French lay Protestant, leader of the French Women Scouts Federation from 1916 onwards, where she encouraged spiritual practice. In 1929, she opened a spiritual retreat centre in Saint-Germain-en-Laye and then, in 1937, the French Pastors Association asked her to take care of a house for spiritual retreats and meetings in Pomeyrol. During WWII, the occupation of France and the commandeering of the house of Saint-Germain en Laye by the Germans caused the community to regroup in Pomeyrol. It opened its door widely to numerous meetings of pastorals, catechetics, and adult movements, as well as to many refugees and fugitives. It is within this framework that the "Theses of Pomeyrol", one of the first acts of spiritual resistance to Nazism in France, were developed in 1941.

The place was requisitioned in February 1944, ransacked, used by the French Forces of the Interior and then as a camp. It was only recovered, badly damaged, in 1946 and gradually restored with the support of Marc Boegner, the president of the Protestant Federation of France. Then, in 1950, Antoinette Butte founded the Pomeyrol Community, a women's religious order dedicated to prayer, and she remained in charge as their prioress until her retirement in 1975.

In November 1951, the three residents of the community dedicated themselves to each other and to the community for life at a hand laying ceremony. In 1955, a fourth sister took her solemn vows in the presence of the Regional President of the Reformed Church of France. Shortly afterwards, two sisters ensured, for three winters, a presence at the heart of the fighting theatre in Algeria.

In 1953, the Regional Council of the Reformed Church of France officially recognized the Religious Community of Pomeyrol.

== Philosophy ==
The Sisters of Pomeyrol dedicate themselves to the ministry of prayer, and thus to being "sentinels", "watchers" in the Church and for the world. They follow the Rule of Saint Benedict.

From its beginnings in Saint-Germain en Laye, the Community had lived an experience of faith. They prayed for the needed money and it came either from participants or from other donors. The philosophy developed by the community from 1950 onwards was "to live above all an openness to God, in prayer and in silence". A motto displayed by the community is: "God leads, prayer broods, people work."

The community does not make strategies or plans, it believes that it is God who acts through men and women. "Do not seek to do good, be in God; and good will just fall off your life as mature fruit falls off the tree."

Finally, the fact of being a small community of women is reflected by the Community of Pomeyrol in this expression of their calling: "The essential role of a small community of women is to be a matrix; it is a living cell that transmits life."

== Activities ==
The activities of the Pomeyrol community have developed organically and spontaneously from the initial "matrix":

- Celebrations: in addition to the Sunday Protestant church service, the community celebrates with fervour the festivals of the Christian liturgical year, which attract many Christians from the region, both Protestant and Catholic. Parishes all over France call on the community to lead prayer vigils, retreats or preaching.
- Participation in the life of the church: the sisters hold positions in the local or regional United Protestant Church of France: Elder of the neighbouring Protestant parish of Beaucaire, catechism instructor, member of the Regional Ecumenical Commission, member of the Regional Commission for Evangelisation.
- Retreats: The Pomeyrol community is very successful in its retreats that bring together people of all faiths. It offers a place of renewal or work to those who need serenity or who are looking for the direction to give their lives.
- Ecumenism: Pomeyrol is located in Catholic Provence not far from the Huguenot part of Languedoc. It practices ecumenism actively.
- Local animation: the neighbouring village is in close contact with the community. It benefits from the services of the sisters for visits and care. Deep friendships have been sealed. Donations in kind, sometimes generous, help people to live.
- "Third order": the Community has shared its values and practices with a wider circle of more than a hundred men and women called "companions" who practice the spirituality of Pomeyrol in their family and professional environment. Their commitment is to detach themselves from their "selves" in order to dedicate their lives to God and to commit themselves concretely in the service of the Church and the spirituality of the Community, in the spirit of the Beatitudes. The discipline of "companions" commits them to practice daily meditation accompanied by the recitation of the Beatitudes or the Epistle on Love, to consecrate tithes to God and to make an annual retreat in a Christian community.

== Governance ==
The sisters elect their prioress when it is time for her to retire. Thus, on February 17, 2019, after a year-long discernment process, Sister Martha Elisabeth was elected by the nine sisters currently in the community to succeed Sister Danièle, who had been the prioress of the community for 26 years. Thanks to the maturation process which was followed, the 9 sisters voted unanimously for this sister of Swiss origin. The transfer of powers was made in the presence of Emmanuelle Seyboldt, president of the United Protestant Church of France of which the community of Pomeyrol is a full member.

== Bibliography ==
- (in French) Pierre Bolle, "Antoinette Butte, les Éclaireuses et l'Évangile", Gérard Cholvy, Bernard Comte, Vincent Feroldi,Jeunesses chrétiennes au XX^{e} siècle, Paris, Éditions ouvrières, 1991, p. 44-47
- (in French) Pierre Bolle and Patrick Cabanel, "Antoinette Butte", in Patrick Cabanel and André Encrevé (dir.),Dictionnaire biographique des protestants français de 1787 à nos jours, volume 1: A-C, Les Éditions de Paris Max Chaleil, Paris, 2015, p. 528-529 ISBN 978-2846211901
- (in French) Michel Clément,Un monachisme protestant ? Spiritualités et règles de trois communautés protestantes en France : Reuilly, Pomeyrol, Villeméjane (A Protestant monasticism? Spiritualities and rules of three Protestant communities in France: Reuilly, Pomeyrol, Villeméjane), Paris, 2012, 156 p.,see online
- (in French) Nathalie Duval, "Le scoutisme pour "sortir de chez elles": la Fédération française des éclaireuses et la promotion féminine (1921–1964)", "Bulletin de la Société de l'histoire du protestantisme français", t. 161/1, 2015, p. 109–133
