= Dominique Reynié =

French academic (born 1960)

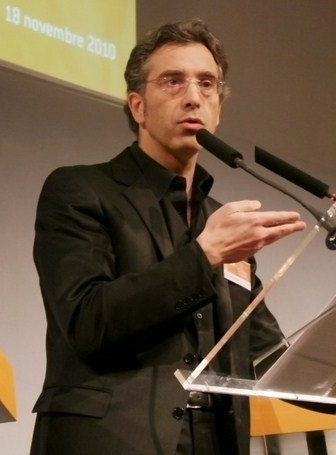
- Dominique Reynié (2010)
- Born: 17 June 1960 (age 66); Rodez, France
- Education: Sciences-Po Paris - Ph.D. in Political Science
- Occupations: Academic; Political scientist Director General of the Fondation pour l’innovation politique (Foundation for Political Innovation)

Dominique Reynié (born 17 June 1960, Rodez, France) is a French academic. He is a professor of political science at the Institut d'Etudes Politiques de Paris (Sciences Po Paris).

== Biography ==
=== Education ===
Dominique Reynié graduated from Sciences Po Paris in 1983, where he also presented a master thesis in political science in 1984. In 1994, within the same institution, he became a doctor of political science. His thesis was directed by Jean Leca, on the theme: The Democratic Order: The Practical Foundations of a Democratic-type Mass Policy. He earned his Agrégation of political science (French academic certification) in 1997.

=== University career ===
After obtaining his doctorate in 1994, Dominique Reynié held a research position at the Center for Studies of French Politics (Cevipof), where he became a research associate in 1997. He held his first position as University Professor of Political Science at the University of Nice - Sophia Antipolis between 1997 and 1999, before returning to teach at Sciences Po Paris.

In Sciences Po, he led the Interregional Observatory of Politics (Observatoire interrégional du politique) from 2002 to 2005, where he contributed to the publication of a regional level barometer, known as “Le baromètre du fait régional”. He was also director of Sciences Po's master's degree in marketing from 1999 to 2006.

Close advisor to Richard Descoings (director of Sciences Po between 1996 and 2012), Reynié suggested in 1998 that Descoings set up a form of positive discrimination in the Sciences Po entrance examination. This pioneering measure in France was implemented starting 2001 onwards, with the creation of a specific selection process for students from underprivileged areas (French “Priority Education Zones”, also known by the acronym ZEP). This anecdote was lifted off of journalist Raphaëlle Bacqué's portrait of the former Sciences Po director, titled "Richie", a nickname given to Descoings.

In the summer of 2012, after the death of Sciences Po director, Richard Descoings, Dominique Reynié was a candidate to take over management of the institution, and was one of five short-listed, along with Gilles Andréani, Hervé Crès, Jean-Michel Blanquer and Frédéric Mion (who was appointed).

At Sciences Po, as part of the "political theory" dimension of the school's master's degree in Political Science, he currently leads a course dedicated to the new framework surrounding State Rationality, within the context of the GAFAM era (Google, Amazon, Facebook, Apple, Microsoft). Within the doctoral school, he co-hosts a seminar with Elisabeth de Castex on "The Human Condition in the era of N.B.I.C” (nanotechnology, biology, computing and cognitive science). He also teaches a course on the genealogy of the European idea. Reynié remains a research associate at Cevipof.

Since 1997, Dominique Reynié has been a regular contributor to the media. He publishes editorials in Le Figaro, Le Monde or Libération. In 2011 and 2012, he holds a weekly chronicle on France Culture radio entitled “The World According to Dominique Reynié”.

=== Foundation for Political Innovation (Fondation pour l’innovation politique) ===
In October 2008, Dominique Reynié succeeded Franck Debié as Director General of the Foundation for Political Innovation (Fondation pour l’innovation politique, also known as Fondapol), a think tank founded in 2004 which, at the time of its creation, was close to the political party UMP (Union for a Popular Movement, which later became known as The Republicans-LR). Under his leadership, the think tank now asserts itself as "liberal, progressive and European".

Expert on political, economic and social issues, he takes part in the work of the Observatory of the Decentralization of the Senate, and contributes in particular to the report "Being Locally Elected Today: Adapting our Local Governance to the Challenge of Decentralization", published in 2007.

In 2010, he spoke before the Observatory as part of an information mission on political polls. Reynié is also a member of the National Consultative Commission on Human Rights.

In 2010, with the Foundation for Political Innovation, he participated in the creation of the Think Tanks Forum, a meeting which is open to the public and convenes prominent French think tanks at the Sorbonne University, to discuss major contemporary economic and social issues.

In 2012 he was a member of the "Visitors Program" of the BEPA (Bureau of European Policy Advisers).

=== Political life ===
Dominique Reynié was a candidate to lead the Languedoc-Roussillon-Midi-Pyrénées region's joint list representing both the LR and UDI parties, during the regional elections of December 2015. On April 25, 2015, he was named against Bernard Carayon, after the fourth round of a vote by a "committee of the wise" composed of 40 local and national elected representatives.

In October 2015, his eligibility is questioned by Jean-Pierre Grand, Senator LR, for a domiciliation issue.

In the first round, he obtains 18.84% of the votes, which puts him in third position behind Louis Aliot (National Front) 31.83% and Carole Delga (Socialist Party) 24.41%. In his home department, Aveyron, he is leading with 30.53% of the vote, ahead of Carole Delga (25.5%) and Louis Aliot (21.74%). On the second round of the regional election, his score is 21.32%, behind Carole Delga (44.8%) and Louis Aliot (33.9%).

He was elected chairman of the LR-UDI opposition group in the regional council with 20 votes (23 participants, 2 abstentions and 1 vote against). More than a year later, on May 27, 2016, his election was canceled by the Conseil d'État (State Council): Dominique Reynié was indeed a resident in the region as required by the electoral rules, but the date on his rental contract was considered too late when compared with the deadline for a candidate to be eligible for election in 2015. Dominique Reynié complied with the decision of the Conseil d’Etat.

He later told the newspaper La Depêche: "What finally hurt me the most is that it publicly challenges my origins in Aveyron. I was born there, my father is buried there. It's my home, and where my roots are."

He was replaced at his seat by the Mayor of Millau, Christophe Saint-Pierre.

=== Public policy positions and work ===
==== Economic and social liberalism ====
Dominique Reynié claims a liberal position, he is particularly in favor of individual liberties and a limitation of the intervention of the State in the economic and social life of individuals.

In this regard, he supported for example the draft reform of the Labor Code of the Government of Manuel Valls (El Khomri law) by launching a petition on February 26, 2016. He also supports same-sex marriage, and the liberalization of access to medically assisted reproduction and gestational surrogacy.

In 2011, under his direction, the Foundation for Political Innovation published "12 ideas for 2012" which is presented in multiple concrete proposals and which, in his words, would "redefine a society’s vision". In this document, the Foundation was particularly in favor of same-sex marriage as well as adoption by same-sex couples, the introduction of VAT to combat the relocation of companies outside France, the development of online commerce, the sale of non-prescription drugs in supermarkets, a better evaluation of public services, a massive investment in R&D within the energy sector, the development of open data and open government, and redesigning the educational system for more equal opportunities, or a better policy for cultural diversity.

==== Populism ====
Dominique Reynié studies and describes the growing phenomena of populism and nationalism, particularly in reaction to globalization and with respect to the increased economic competition that it generates.

He also coined the concept of "patrimonial populism", a phenomenon he describes as "the political exploitation of the fear of losing one’s tangible and intangible heritage". According to him, a "part of Europeans now lives with the fear of a collective downgrade, a fear which could be combined with that of a personal downgrade". Dominique Reynié contemplates the strengthening of a "European public power" and the reaffirmation of Europe's borders as one of the possible answers to the rise of populism in Europe.

On the topic, he has published two major books : Populisms: the Fatal Slope, in 2011, and The New Populisms, in 2013.

==== Recomposition of the political landscape ====
In France, with the election of Emmanuel Macron as President of the Republic, Dominique Reynié believes that the traditional political parties "are dying because they have become machines without soul or breath". The researcher believes that it is no longer the political parties that are the cement of the left-right divide but values anchored in French society that remain divisive despite the gradual disappearance of political parties.

==== Demography and migration policy ====
Dominique Reynié notes that, in the face of the structural demographic aging of most European societies, unless birth rates improve, immigration should mechanically become the main source of population growth in the coming decades. Faced with this observation and the popular fears that are attached to it, he advocates a debate on the "ethnocultural recomposition" of European societies rather than on immigration policy itself.

==== Religion ====
In 2014, the Foundation for Political Innovation, in partnership with the American Jewish Committee, launched and published an unprecedented survey on "anti-Semitism in the French public opinion", taking into account data on the number of antisemitic acts and the results of two surveys conducted with the IFOP (French research and polling institute). The investigation highlights 3 main hotbeds of antisemitic opinions in France: among National Front sympathizers and voters supporting Marine Le Pen, among Muslims, among supporters of the Left Front and voters of Jean-Luc Mélenchon. The three profile types are found among users of social networks, discussion forums and video-sharing sites. It also shows that between the period 1994-2004 and the period 2004–2013, the number of antisemitic acts tripled.

In 2015, alongside the Foundation for Political Innovation, he launched a series of eleven studies titled "Values of Islam", with the aim of feeding the debate on the future and the place of Islam in France. Most of these studies are written by Muslim authors and were translated into Arabic.

In 2017, he contributed to the publication in France of a major survey on antisemitic violence in Europe, based on data from 2005 to 2015, collected by Johannes Due Enstad. He also published, in line with the study of 2014, a new survey entitled: "France: Jews seen by Muslims", still in partnership with the American Jewish Committee.

==== Europe ====
Dominique Reynié defends the idea of Europe as an "additional public power", acting alongside nation States and not in their place. He proposes the construction of a "European public power" to support the national public authorities, to help them and "protect the destiny of Europeans in the context of globalization". Dominique Reynié regrets that the populists adopt postures that are increasingly less European, or even anti-European, thus making the emergence of a European public authority more difficult.

In 2004, Dominique Reynié decided in favor of negotiations for the entry of Turkey into the European Union in an opinion piece published in the newspaper Le Figaro. At the time, he welcomed Turkey's progress in the field of human rights and fundamental freedoms, as well as the democratic rise to power of a moderate, modern and pro-Western Muslim party.

In 2005, in Sciences Po's Raisons Politiques magazine, he shares the conclusions of his work on the notion of European public opinion and European public space. In particular, he describes the emergence of European collective mobilizations, based on unpublished data relating to the protests against the war in Iraq in 2003.

A supporter of a federal Europe as a political solution to the crisis which has been characterized by the rise of populism, he signed the manifesto "For a solidarity Euro-federation and democracy" in March 2012, led by Jacques Attali. He stressed that "the need to go further in the European sharing of national sovereignties, to fight the economic crisis and to assert the European power in the world ", and called for the establishment of more democracy at the European level.

In 2017, in an editorial published on the website of Le Figaro (a French newspaper), he said that the construction of a European sovereignty offers the European States "the only and last chance" to weigh in on the course of history. In particular, he said that it would be an instrument needed to reinforce European investments in transport, energy, telecommunications, innovation, research and higher education, infrastructure, and to better resist the influence of GAFAM.

In 2017, he led a major international survey with the Foundation for Political Innovation, on the theme "What Next for Democracy?", covering 26 countries, including 25 European countries. The survey questions, among other things, the rise of populism in Europe as well as citizens' feelings about Europe and its institutions, and reveals that a majority of Europeans believe that democracy in their country is not working optimally. The book espouses the notion of a weakening of democratic values in Europe.

== Decorations and awards ==
- For his book Populism: the fatal slope, Dominique Reynié received the political book prize in 2012 and the members of the National Assembly book prize the same year.
- Knight of the Order of Merit (Chevalier de l’ordre du Mérite)
- Knight of the Legion of Honour (Chevalier de la Légion d’Honneur)

== Publications ==
Since the beginning of his academic career, Dominique Reynié has published and directed more than fifty books. In addition to these publications, Dominique Reynié has made numerous contributions to scientific books and journals in the field of political science.

=== Books ===
- Le Triomphe de l’opinion publique, L'espace public français du xvie au xxe siècle, Éditions Odile Jacob, 1998. (ISBN 978-2-7381-0465-6)
- La fracture occidentale, naissance d'une opinion européenne, Editions de la Table Ronde, 2004 (ISBN 978-2-7103-2690-8)
- Les Européens en 2004, Ed. Odile Jacob, 2004 (ISBN 978-2-7381-1496-9)
- Les Élections européennes de juin 2004, avec Corinne Deloy, PUF, 2004, (ISBN 978-2-13-055155-3)
- Le Vertige social-nationaliste : la Gauche du Non et le référendum de 2005, Editions de la Table Ronde, 2005 (ISBN 978-2-7103-2831-5)
- Chirac : le premier président d’un monde nouveau, Plon, 2007, (ISBN 978-2-259-20656-3)
- Populisme : la pente fatale, Plon, 2011. Prix du livre politique 2012 et Prix des députés 2012 (ISBN 978-2-259-20890-1)
- Les nouveaux populismes, Pluriel, 2013 (ISBN 978-2-81850-342-3)

=== Collective works ===
- MANIN (Bernard), PASQUINO (Pasquale) et REYNIÉ (Dominique) (dir.), Opinion publique et démocratie : séminaire de l'École normale supérieure, Centre national de la recherche scientifique, 1987
- LAZZERI (Christian) et REYNIÉ (Dominique) (dir.), La Raison d’État : politique et rationalité, Paris, Presses universitaires de France, Recherches politiques, 1992, (ISBN 978-2-13-044588-3).
- LAZZERI (Christian) et REYNIÉ (Dominique) (dir.), Le Pouvoir de la raison d’État, Presses universitaires de France, 1992
- LAZZERI (Christian) et REYNIÉ (Dominique) (dir.), Politiques de l’intérêt, Presses universitaires franc-comtoises, 1998 (ISBN 978-2-9133-2218-9)
- PERRINEAU (Pascal) et REYNIÉ (Dominique) (dir.), Le Vote incertain : les élections régionales de mars 1998, Presses de Sciences Po, 1999 (ISBN 978-2-7246-0765-9)
- PERRINEAU (Pascal) et REYNIÉ (Dominique) (dir.), Dictionnaire du vote, Presses universitaires de France, 2001, (ISBN 978-2-1305-1345-2).
- REYNIÉ (Dominique) (dir.), Les Droites en Europe, Paris, Fondation pour l’innovation politique/Presses universitaires de France, 2012 (ISBN 978-2-13-059026-2).
- REYNIÉ (Dominique) (dir.), Valeurs partagées : face au bouleversement des valeurs, la recherche d’un nouveau consensus, Fondation pour l’innovation politique/Presses universitaires de France, 2012 (ISBN 978-2-13-059029-3)
- REYNIÉ (Dominique) (dir.), Où va la démocratie, Plon, 2017 (ISBN 978-2259263634)
