= Ma'adin Ijafen =

Archaeological site in Mauritania

Ma'adin Ijafen is an archaeological site in an area of dunes in the Sahara in eastern Mauritania. It was first discovered in the early 1960s by the French explorer Théodore Monod. Monod followed up on information provided by local hunters, searching for evidence to confirm the magnitude of the historical trans-Saharan copper trade. 450 mi (720 km) into the desert, he located bundles of cowrie shells and ingots of brass wrapped in ropes and matting and hidden in the sand.

The site was originally thought to be the site of a caravan wreck, but Monod believed that the valuables had been hidden intentionally, either by the travelers seeking to prevent a bandit attack or by bandits hoping to retrieve the items later. It is unclear where the caravan originated from, or what prevented the treasure from being retrieved.

== Analysis ==
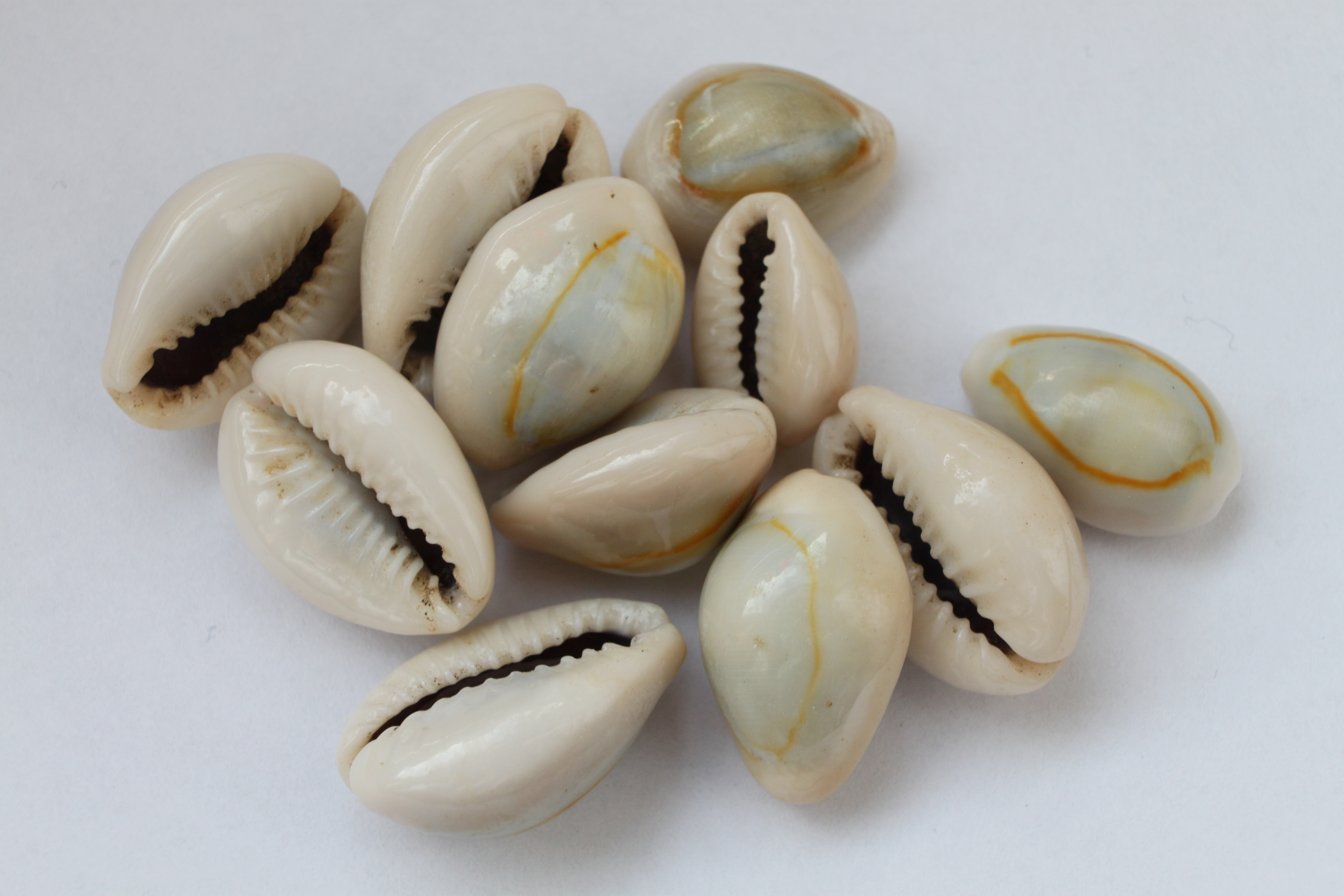
Milled cowrie shells of the type used for currency

All told, Monod recovered 2,085 brass ingots of approximately 29.5 in (75 cm) in length, weighing up to 1 lb (0.45 kg) each. They were tied up in bundles of 100 ingots each. He believed that each camel in a caravan could carry four bundles, or 400 lb (180 kg) all together. The entire hoard weighed approximately two tons.

Analysis of the ingots indicates that they are a brass alloy of approximately 80% copper with 20% zinc. They have been dated to approximately the 11th–12th centuries CE. Analysis of the lead isotopes in two of the ingots found that the metal in the ingots was consistent with ore from northwest Europe, indicating that the metal had possibly come to Africa from Europe.

The cowrie shells have been subject to much less inspection than the ingots, but are presumed to have originated in the Maldives.
