= Théodore Beck =

French pastor and teacher (1839–1936)

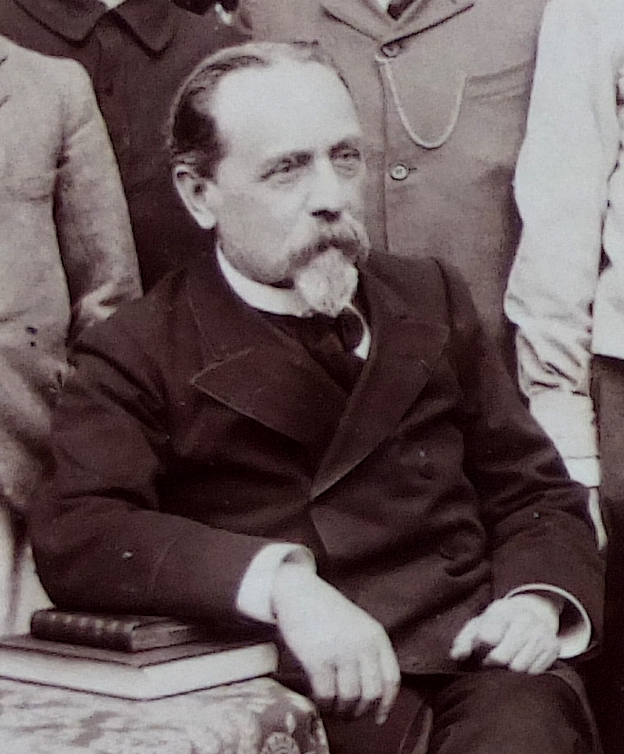
Beck in 1902

Théodore Beck (1839–1936) was a French Lutheran pastor and educator from Alsace–Lorraine, and a longtime director of the École alsacienne in Paris.

== Biography ==
Beck was born in Oberseebach, on 8 July 1839, the son of a pastor, Jean Beck, and Sophie Julie Roehrich. He studied theology in Strasbourg and Geneva, and was ordained in 1862. He became a vicar in Colmar, a pastor and administrator in Muttersholtz (from 1813 to 1908) and in Masevaux (from 1867 to 1872), and was a pastor in Strasbourg until 1880, when he came in conflict with the German authorities (Alsace having been annexed into the German empire in 1871). He left the region in 1880 to become a professor of German at the École alsacienne in Paris, founded in 1874. The Revue Alsacienne noted that his departure from Strasbourg was regretted by his parishioners, despite the insults hurled at him "by a certain German press".

Beck succeeded F. Rieder (likewise a pastor) as director of the École alsacienne in 1891 and worked in that position until 1922. He had been interested in educational matters for a long time; in Muttersholz, he had set up a program for adult education, and during his ministry in Strasbourg had started a boarding school for young girls. Education at the École alsacienne differed from traditional schools. There were no end-of-year awards, only "a simple public attestation as satisfactory (with mention of good or very good) for those who deserve it"; discipline did not involve corporal punishment. He and his educational expertise are credited with the École alsacienne's growth. He was made a Commander in the Legion of Honour in 1929. He died in Paris, on 18 July 1936.

== Educational and other publications ==
Beck wrote a number of textbooks and manuals for secondary education, including the Cours élémentaire de langue allemande (with A. Bossert; 3rd ed. 1905) and Lectures pratiques allemandes (1902). He also contributed to the Cinquantenaire de l'École alsacienne (1924), and edited the journal Le Progrès religieux. He also published a memoir, Mes souvenirs 1890–1922 (Paris: Fischbacher, 1934).
