= Asselar man =

Later Stone Age Malian skeleton

Adrar des Ifoghas and the Kidal Region

Asselar man is a Neolithic (Later Stone Age) skeleton found at Adrar des Ifoghas, Mali, which has been dated to between 9500 BP and 7000 BP, amid the early Holocene Wet Phase. The Asselar skeleton was likely intentionally buried.

== Geography ==
Adrar des Ifoghas is a massif is located, near Essouk, in the Kidal Region of Mali.

== Archaeology ==
=== Discovery ===
The Asselar skeleton was discovered by Theodore Monod and Wladimir Besnard during an expedition in 1927. (Note: Various sources incorrectly name as M.M. Besnard or M.V. Besnard.) Wickliffe Draper funded the expedition.

=== Dating ===
The Asselar skeleton has been dated to around 6,400 BP, making it no older than the Holocene. Along with fossils such as those found at Iwo Eleru (11,000 BP) and Ishango (8,000 BP), which were excavated from archaeological sites in West Africa and Central Africa, the Asselar skeleton is one of the earliest known anatomically modern human skeletons, with a phenotype that is characteristic of later Sub-Saharan African populations, located in Sub-Saharan Africa. Older fossils with a similar morphology have also been found near Khartoum, Sudan, which has been dated to between 8000 BCE and 5000 BCE.

Due to there being no specific publication or reference found in and among existing academic literature, beyond simple mention (e.g., Cheikh Anta Diop in 1968), which provides contextualizing explanation for the dating of the Asselar skeleton at 6390 BP, as well as the absence of data on the femur used to generate the date and the degree of error that 1960s-era carbon-14 dating methods can produce, the date of 6390 BP provided for the Asselar skeleton is regarded as meriting caution in its consideration and use. More recently, in the 1980s, geological dating from the Asselar site in the Saharan region of northern Mali has produced a date for the Asselar skeleton as being between 9500 BP and 7000 BP, amid the early Holocene Wet Phase.

=== Burial ===
The Asselar skeleton was found near what, during the time of the African Humid Period, was likely a lake. Medical imaging techniques of the skeleton and surrounding matrix show that the Asselar individual was likely intentionally buried, rather than having been drowned and subsequently buried by accident as originally thought. Human remains found buried in similar anatomical positions have been found at other early Holocene sites such as Hassi-el-Abiod in Mali.

== See also ==
- List of human evolution fossils
