= Théodore Monod =

French naturalist and explorer (1902–2000)

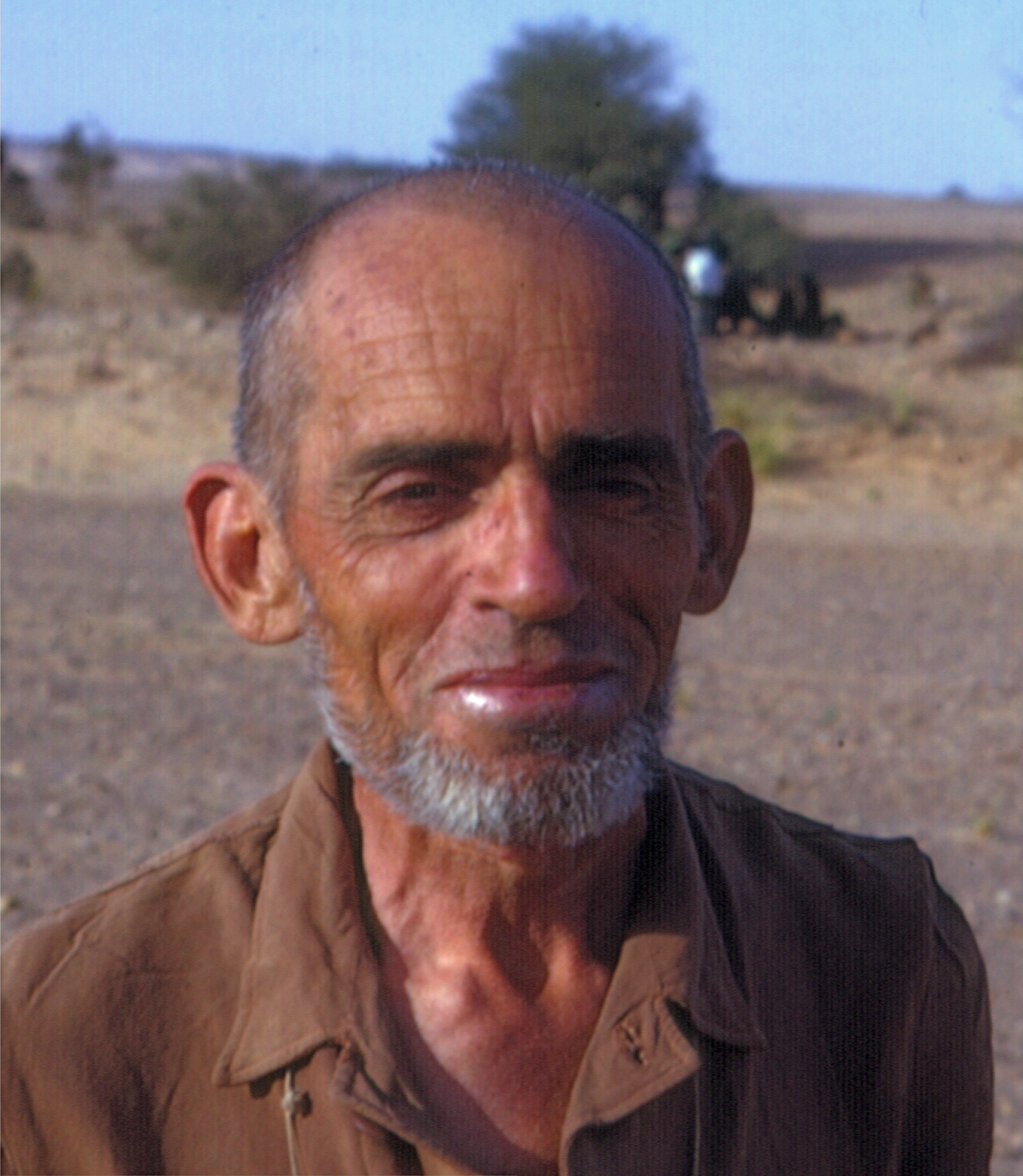
- Born: 9 April 1902; Rouen, Normandy, France
- Died: 22 November 2000 (aged 98); Versailles, Yvelines, France

Théodore André Monod (9 April 1902 – 22 November 2000) was a French naturalist, humanist, scholar and explorer.

== Early life and education ==
Monod was the son of Wilfred Monod, a pastor of l'Oratoire du Louvre, which Theodore also attended. Monad attended the Lycée Pierre Corneille in Rouen. as well as the École alsacienne, and obtained a doctorate in science from Sorbonne University in 1922.

He co-founded a Protestant Order of people who pray, named les Veilleurs (the Watchers) and wrote a prayer book for the order.

== Exploration ==
His first job was as an assistant in the Ichtyology department at Muséum national d'histoire naturelle in Paris.

He began his career in Africa with the study of monk seals on Mauritania's Cap Blanc peninsula. However, he soon turned his attention to the Sahara Desert, which he would survey for more than sixty years in search of meteorites. Though he failed to find the meteorite he sought, he discovered numerous plant species as well as several important Neolithic sites. Perhaps his most important find (together with Wladimir Besnard) was the Asselar man, a 6,000-year-old skeleton of the Adrar des Ifoghas that many scholars believe to be the first remains of a distinctly black person. In the early 1960s he discovered the caravan wreck site at Ma'adin Ijafen.

He founded the Institut fondamental d’Afrique noire in Senegal. He became a member of the Académie des sciences d'outre-mer in 1949, member of the Académie de marine in 1957 and member of the Académie des sciences in 1963. He was a charter member of the World Academy of Art and Science.

== Scientific work ==
The scientific bibliography of Théodore Monod includes more than 700 works on topics - from his thesis subject, the Gnathiidae (a family of parasitic Isopoda), to the subject that he held close to his heart until his death: the Scaridae, which he published on in 1994 in collaboration with Canadian research scientist Andrea Bullock.

Monod discovered and gave his name to 30 species of insects and plants, 50 crustaceans and several fish.

== Private life and activism ==
He subsequently became the founding president of the Francophone Unitarian Association (1986-1990), the first openly Unitarian religious organization established in France. The association merged with the Fraternal Assembly of Christian Unitarians in 1996.

Monod was also politically active, taking part in pacifist and antinuclear protests until only some months before his death. He wrote several articles and books that adumbrated the emerging environmentalist movement. He described himself as a Christian anarchist.

In 1970, he led an International Committee for the Defence of Ernest Ouandié during his trial; the Cameroonian revolutionary was executed on the orders of the regime.

Monod was the great-grandson of Frédéric Monod. He shared a common ancestor with biologist Jacques Monod, the musician Jacques-Louis Monod, the politician Jérôme Monod and director Jean-Luc Godard.

Monod was a strict vegetarian who advocated for animal rights. He never touched alcohol, meat or tobacco. He once walked 600 miles in the Sahara to prove that he had sufficient stamina without eating meat.

Monod was married to Olga Pickova and they had three children.

== Selected works ==
Works re-edited and released by Actes Sud (Arles):

- Méharées, (Paris, 1937), rééd. 1989.
- L'Émeraude des garamantes, (éditions de L'Harmattan, Paris, 1984), rééd. 1992.
- L'Hippopotame et le philosophe, rééd. 1993.
- Désert lybique, éditions Arthaud, 1994.
- Majâbat Al-Koubrâ, Actes Sud, 1996.
- Maxence au désert, Actes Sud, Arles, 1995.
- Tais-toi et marche ..., exploration journal from El Ghallaouya-Aratane-Chinguetti, Actes Sud, 2002.

== Awards ==
- 1960 Patrons's Medal of the Royal Geographical Society for his work in the Sahara.

== See also ==
- Category:Taxa named by Théodore Monod
