= Marta Vannucci =

Brazilian biologist (1921–2021)

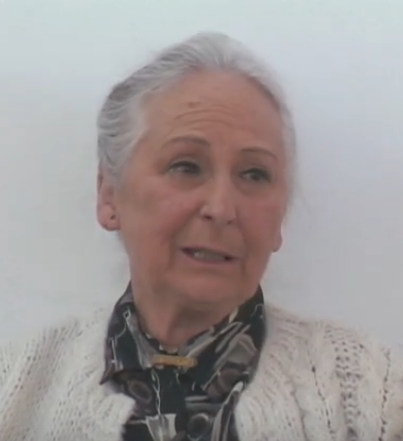
Vannucci in 2004

Marta Vannucci (10 May 1921 – São Paulo, 15 January 2021) was a Brazilian biologist and professor whose main research in biological oceanography was focused on mangroves and plankton. Marta was the first woman to become a full member of the Brazilian Academy of Sciences and one of the precursors of oceanography in Brazil.

== Early life ==
Marta was born in Florence, Italy and moved to Brazil with her family when she was still a child in 1927. Her father was a medical doctor and surgeon and a Full Professor at the University of Pádua and the University of Florence. The Vannucci family was a rich and traditional family who left Italy after the fascism ascension. In Brazil, her father worked as a surgeon at the Hospital Matarazzo. Marta had a lot of contact with Brazilian scientists due to his father's job.

== Career ==
She studied at the Colégio Dante Alighieri and the University of São Paulo. She earned her PhD in 1944 and continued working as an assistant for Ernst Marcus, a professor at the Zoology Department, until 1950.

Marta was invited to be part of the Instituto Paulista de Oceanografia, the first institute of oceanography research in Brazil, which was part of the Agriculture Department. Together with Wladimir Besnard, who was the institute director, they shared the views that the institute should focus more than just fishing but on oceanographic science research in general. That is why they worked to get the institute incorporated into the University of São Paulo. The entire process happened in nine months, and the institute was renamed Instituto Oceanográfico, becoming a research institute at the University of São Paulo in 1951.

Under the knowledge and influence of Wladimir Besnard, who was studying in Cananéia, a region rich in mangroves, Marta had an opportunity to specialise in mangrove ecosystems. In 1956, Marta earned a scholarship from UNESCO to research at the University of Marine Biological Station Millport, having the opportunity to visit other research centres in Scotland and learn techniques to study plankton.

She became the first woman director of the Instituto Oceanográfico in 1964. During her management, she organised post-graduate courses, started the construction of the institute building at the University of São Paulo, and negotiated the purchase and followed the construction of the first Brazilian oceanography research ship, which was named to honour the institute's first director, Wladimir Besnard. And in 1966, she was the first woman to become a full member of the Brazilian Academy of Sciences.

From 1969 to 1971, she worked for UNESCO at the Indian Ocean Biological Centre at Cochin in India as a curator of the international Indian Ocean expedition plankton collections. She moved to Mexico in 1972 to work at the Universidad Autónoma de México and returned to India in 1974 as the UNESCO director regional officer in Delhi. From 1982 to 1990, she became the chief technical advisor of UNDP/UNESCO programmes on mangroves in the Asian and Pacific regions.

In 1989, Marta published a book about the relationship of humans and mangroves for non-specialists called "The Mangroves and Us: a synthesis of Insights." The first Portuguese edition of the book was published in 1999. For 15 years, Marta was invited by Dr Shigeyuki Baba to teach a mangrove course to international students in Japan. Through this work, she had the chance to contribute to a collaborative publication of a world mangrove atlas.

From 1990 to 1999, Marta was the vice president of the International Society for Mangrove Ecosystems, becoming the acting President in 1999 and, in the following year, an Honorary adviser for the Society.

In 1997, she received, from the Brazilian President, the Grand Cross of the Order of Scientific Merit.

Marta became internationally known for her work in biological oceanography, with over 100 published scientific papers. Many scientists who knew Marta would call her "Mother of Mangroves".

Marta retired from UNESCO in 1989.

== Personal life ==
Marta got married twice and had two sons, Érico and Dino. During an interview with the Brazilian Academy of Sciences, she stated it "is actually difficult to reconcile the life of a wife and mother with that of a scientist".

Marta died on 15 January 2021 in São Paulo at 99 years old.
