= Marta Tufet =

British biologist and public health resource coordinator

Marta Tufet Bayona
- Other names: Marta Tufet
- Education: Imperial College London
- Occupations: Biologist; Public health resource coordinator
- Years active: 2006-present

Marta Tufet Bayona is a British and Spanish biologist and public health resource coordinator with a specialty in malaria. She is executive director of the UK Collaborative on Development Research.

== Early life and education ==
Tufet is from the United Kingdom. She is half Ecuadorian.

Tufet received a BSc in biology from Imperial College London. She remained there for her doctoral degree, where she specialised in parasitology and studied rhoptry proteins. In 2006, Tufet earned a PhD in cellular and molecular biology from the Faculty of Life Sciences at Imperial College London. Her thesis was titled "Search for Novel Rhoptry Proteins in Plasmodium Berghei".

== Career ==
From 2002 to 2005, Tufet worked as a research assistant at both Imperial College London and Leiden University Medical Center. From 2006 to 2009, Tufet was a scientific copy editor at Nature Publishing.

From 2008 to 2009, she was a scientific grants writer at the Charles Darwin Foundation for the Galapagos Islands in Ecuador. It was whilst working at the Charles Darwin Foundation that she first became concerned about the challenges that face scientific researchers in the developing world. She lived in the Galápagos Islands and became involved with the Galapagos Conservation Trust.

From 2009 to 2017, Tufet worked in various positions at Wellcome Trust in London. In her position as science portfolio adviser, she coordinated grant funding in the areas of animal health, bacteriology and immunology. This involved coordination of projects for the KEMRI-Wellcome Trust Research Programme (a partnership with the Kenya Medical Research Institute), the UK Biobank, the Insect Pollinators Initiative and the Bloomsbury Centre for Tropical Medicine. As international activities adviser, she worked to support educational research as part of the African Institutions Initiative. She worked on the Global Health Trials Initiative, DELTAS Africa programme, and on the Ebola Research Funding Initiative.

In 2014, Tufet worked as an adviser in discovery and translational sciences for the Bill & Melinda Gates Foundation in Seattle, where she looked to develop collaborative projects with the Wellcome Trust. As part of this work, from 2014 to 2015, she established the Alliance for Accelerating Excellence in Science in Africa (AESA) partnership, part of the African Academy of Sciences that was endorsed by the African Union, which looks to develop research infrastructure, support entrepreneurs, train young scientists and identify gaps in African science. She spent one year working at the African Academy of Sciences to implement the AESA partnership, which was in coordination with the African Union's economic development program New Partnership for Africa's Development (NEPAD). The work was funded by the Bill & Melinda Gates Foundation, the Wellcome Trust, and Department for International Development (DFID). As part of her work at the Wellcome Trust, Tufet was involved with the Ebola research response. As part of this work, she oversaw the Kenya Medical Research Institute (KEMRI) programme in Nairobi, Kenya.

From 2016 to 2017, Tufet worked the UK Department of Health and Social Care as a global health research advisor, where she led the United Kingdom's first National Institute for Health Research Global Health Research Programme.

Tufet has served on the World Health Organization Scientific Working Group on research capacity strengthening.

In 2018, Tufet became executive director of the UK Collaborative on Development Research (UKCDR), an interdisciplinary group of governmental departments and international development funding providers

Tufet is involved with the global response to the COVID-19 pandemic. As part of this effort, she partnered with The Global Health Network and the African Academy of Sciences to survey researchers and better understand what the community needs. She identified that researchers needed guidance in how to mitigate myths as well as advice on how and when to implement social distancing.

== Selected works and publications ==
=== Selected works ===
- Tufet Bayona, Marta (2006). Search for Novel Rhoptry Proteins in Plasmodium Berghei (PhD). Imperial College London. OCLC 930642746.
- Tufet, Marta (2008). "NF-κB is not alone". Nature Reviews Immunology. 8 (2): 90–91. doi:10.1038/nri2259. S2CID 46058465.
- Watson, James; Trueman, Mandy; Tufet, Marta; Henderson, Scott; Atkinson, Rachel (9 October 2009). "Mapping terrestrial anthropogenic degradation on the inhabited islands of the Galapagos Archipelago" (PDF). Oryx. 44 (1): 79. doi:10.1017/S0030605309990226. Wikidata ()
- Maher, Dermot; Aseffa, Abraham; Kay, Simon; Tufet Bayona, Marta (17 March 2020). "External funding to strengthen capacity for research in low-income and middle-income countries: exigence, excellence and equity". BMJ Global Health. 5 (3) e002212. doi:10.1136/BMJGH-2019-002212. PMC 7078669. PMID 32206346. Wikidata ()
- Norton, Alice; Mphahlele, Jeffrey; Yazdanpanah, Yazdan; Piot, Peter; Bayona, Marta Tufet (July 2020). "Strengthening the global effort on COVID-19 research" (PDF). The Lancet. 396 (10248): 375. doi:10.1016/S0140-6736(20)31598-1. PMC 7365643. PMID 32682490.
- Norton, Alice; De La Horra Gozalo, Arancha; Feune de Colombi, Nicole; Alobo, Moses; Mutheu Asego, Juliete; Al-Rawni, Zainab; Antonio, Emila; Parker, James; Mwangi, Wayne; Adhiambo, Colette; Marsh, Kevin; Tufet Bayona, Marta; Piot, Peter; Lang, Trudie A. (2020). "The remaining unknowns: A mixed methods study of the current and global health research priorities for COVID-19". BMJ Global Health. 5 (7) e003306. doi:10.1136/bmjgh-2020-003306. medRxiv 10.1101/2020.06.24.20138198v2. PMC 7431769.

=== Selected publications ===
- Tufet, Dr Marta (8 June 2019). "Global issues often seem a world away – but it is in Britain's interest to tackle them". The Telegraph.
- Piot, Peter; Tufet, Marta (12 June 2019). "The UK's role in improving our world". Campaign for Science and Engineering (CaSE).
