= Wladimir Besnard =

French biologist (1890–1960)

Wladimir Besnard (1890, St. Petersburg, Russia – 1960, São Paulo, Brazil) was a French biologist and Brazilian oceanographer. Considered to be the father of Brazilian oceanography, he served as director of the Oceanographic Institute of the University of São Paulo.

He was born in the Russian Empire to French parents.

As a biologist he is credited (together with Theodore Monod) with the discovery of the skeleton of the Asselar man in 1927 (although various sources refer to him as M.M. Besnard or M.V. Besnard).

An oceanographic ship, some undersea features (Besnard Bank, Besnard Passage), and a street in São Paulo (Rua Professor Wladimir Besnard) are named in his honor.

== Oceanographic ship ==
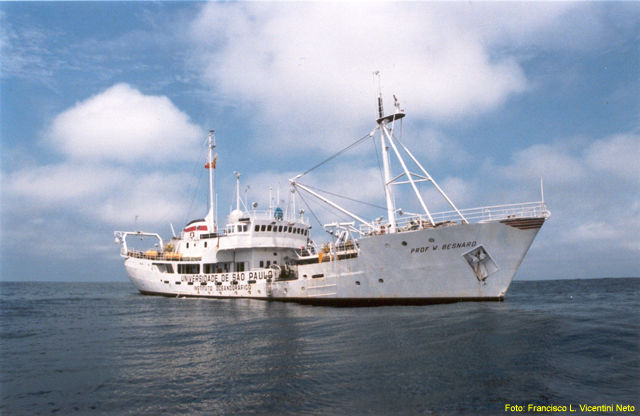
RS Professor Wladimir Besnard

During 1967–2008 Brazil operated Professor W. Besnard, its only oceanographic vessel at that time. The ship was launched on August 18, 1966, from the shipyard Mjellem & Karlsen, Norway, and belonged to the Institute of Oceanography of the University of São Paulo. In 1988 the ship suffered damage from a fire. In 2012 a new ship, Alpha Crucis, has replaced the Professor W. Besnard.
