= Moses Alobo =

African physician, public health researcher

- Born: Kenya
- Education: University of Nairobi (MBChB, 2001); University of Birmingham; (MPH, 2006)
- Employer: African Academy of Sciences

Moses Alobo is a Kenyan physician, public health researcher and social entrepreneur. He leads the African Academy of Sciences Grand Challenges Africa Programme. He specialises in the implementation of health research in resource-limited countries, including programmes in vaccinology and antimicrobial resistance. During the COVID-19 pandemic, Alobo led the African Academy of Sciences' response to coronavirus disease.

== Early life and education ==
Alobo grew up in Kenya. He attended the Alliance High School. Alobo studied medicine at the University of Nairobi. He moved to the United Kingdom as a Chevening Scholar in 2005, where he joined the University of Birmingham. Here he earned a Master's in Public Health, specialising in epidemiology and statistics.

== Career ==
Alobo has worked as medical director at GlaxoSmithKline as well as for Hoffmann-La Roche.

In 2014 Alobo was selected as a Archbishop Desmond Tutu Leadership Fellow, and moved to the Saïd Business School at the University of Oxford. Later that year he was appointed to the Board of Directors of Kenya Medical Research Institute. Alobo serves as the programme manager for the Africa Academy of Sciences Grand Challenges Africa Programme.

Alobo joined the London School of Hygiene & Tropical Medicine in 2018 as a Global Health Leadership fellow. During the COVID-19 pandemic, Alobo was appointed as Head of the African Academy of Sciences' response to coronavirus disease. In particular, he called for governments and stakeholders to support the public health response in Africa. He worked with the World Health Organization to survey African researchers and physicians to better identify their priorities in fighting coronavirus disease, and found that the majority of respondents wanted help with clinical management, infection prevention and epidemiological studies into transmission dynamics.
