= Frédéric Pottecher =

French actor and screenwriter

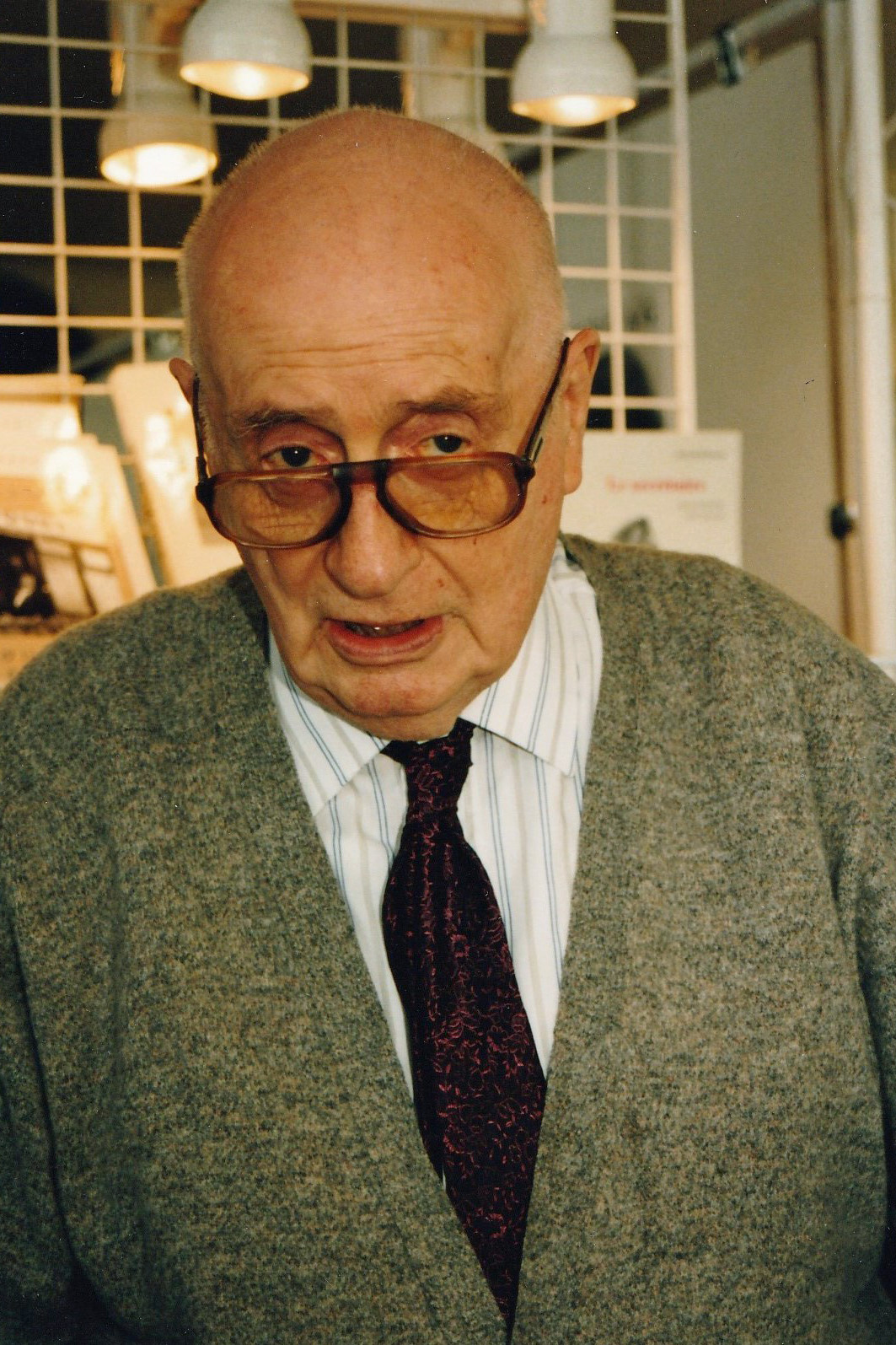
Frédéric Pottecher

Frédéric Pottecher (1905–2001) was a French actor, screenwriter, and court report for radio and television.
