= Marta Camps =

Soil scientist and researcher

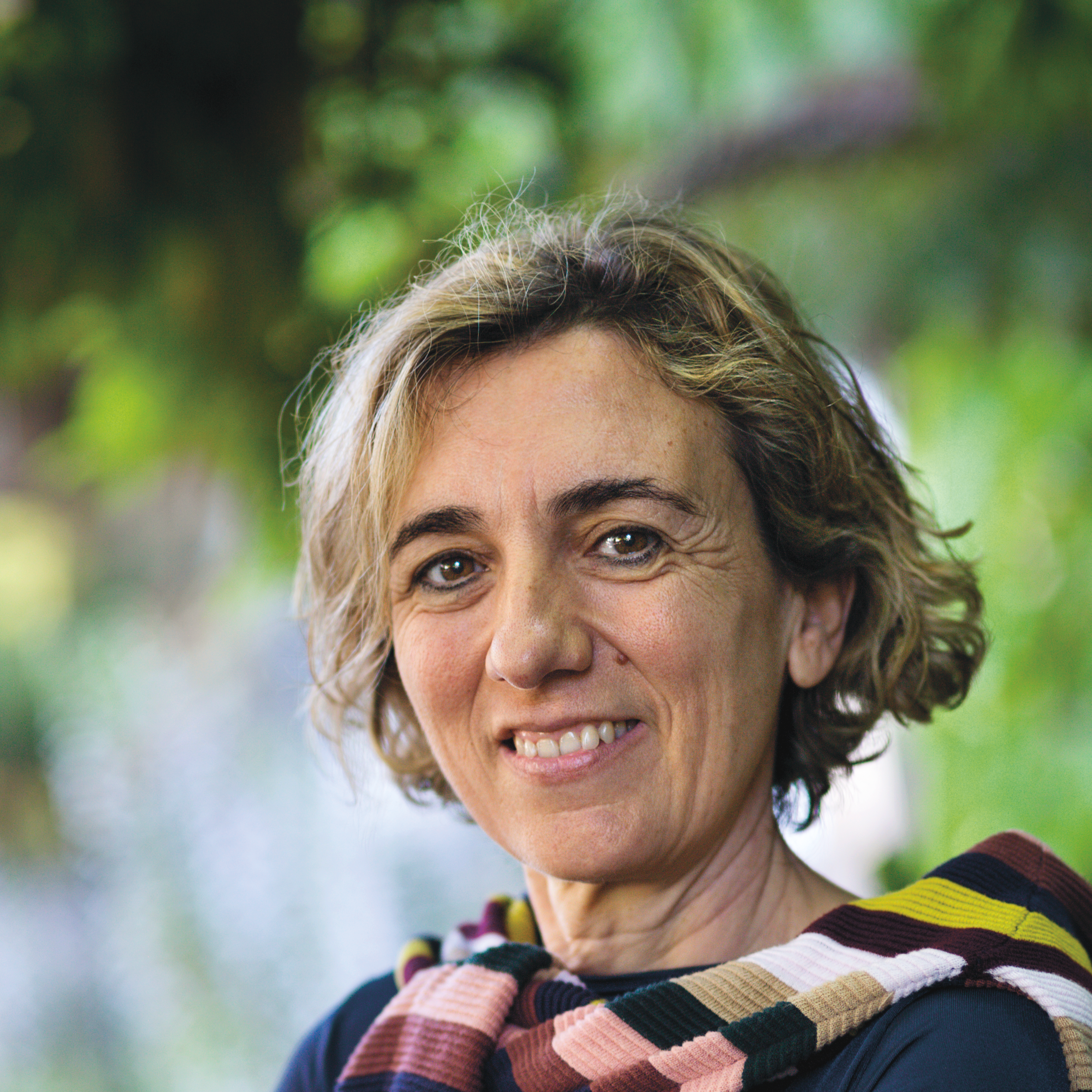
- Other name: Marta Camps Arbestain
- Education: University of California, Davis
- Scientific career
- Fields: Soil Science
- Workplaces: University of Santiago de Compostela, Massey University
- Thesis: Selenium partitioning in the soil-plant-atmosphere system (1995)

Marta Camps-Arbestain, usually known as Marta Camps, is a New Zealand soil science academic, and a full professor at Massey University.

== Academic career ==
Born in Barcelona in 1964, she studied at the Universitat Politècnica de Catalunya. She received her phd in soil science at the University of California, Davis in 1995. It was titled 'Selenium partitioning in the soil-plant-atmosphere system' at the University of California, Davis. Afterwards Camps Arbestain moved to University of Santiago de Compostela and then Massey University, rising to full professor.

== Selected works ==
- Joseph, S. D., Marta Camps-Arbestain, Yun Lin, P. Munroe, C. H. Chia, J. Hook, L. Van Zwieten et al. "An investigation into the reactions of biochar in soil." Soil Research 48, no. 7 (2010): 501–515.
- Herath, H. M. S. K., Marta Camps-Arbestain, and Mike Hedley. "Effect of biochar on soil physical properties in two contrasting soils: an Alfisol and an Andisol." Geoderma 209 (2013): 188–197.
- Wang, Tao, Marta Camps-Arbestain, Mike Hedley, and Peter Bishop. "Predicting phosphorus bioavailability from high-ash biochars." Plant and Soil 357, no. 1-2 (2012): 173–187.
- Okeke, Benedict C., Tariq Siddique, Marta Camps Arbestain, and William T. Frankenberger. "Biodegradation of γ-hexachlorocyclohexane (lindane) and α-hexachlorocyclohexane in water and a soil slurry by a Pandoraea species." Journal of agricultural and food chemistry 50, no. 9 (2002): 2548–2555.
