= Antoinette Butte =

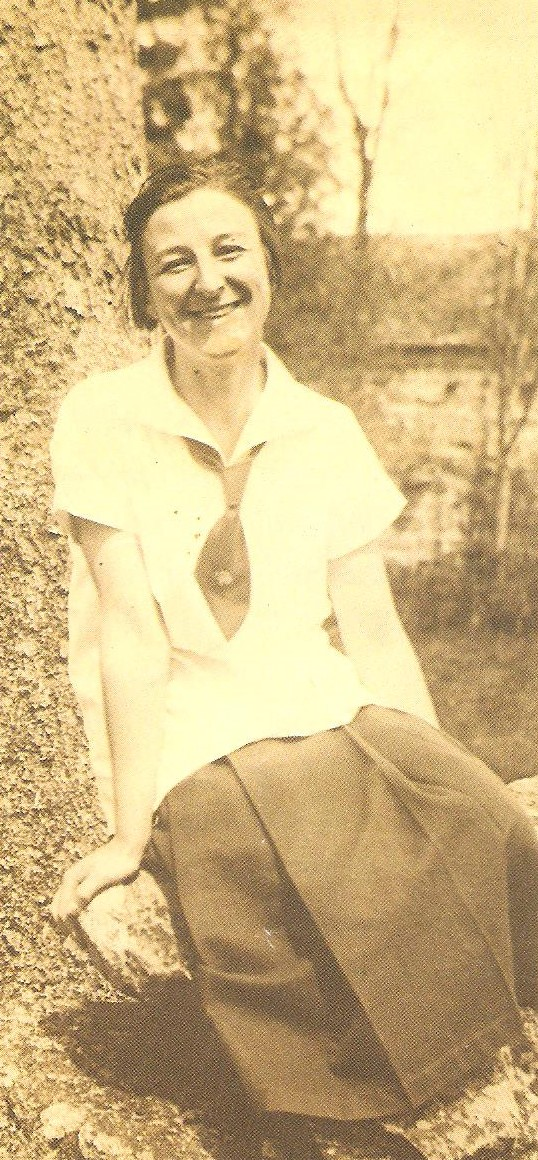
- Born: July 12, 1898; Lunéville, Meurthe-et-Moselle
- Died: April 30, 1986 (aged 87); Tarascon, Bouches-du-Rhône
- Known for: Founder of a Protestant religious community

Antoinette Butte (July 12, 1898 in Lunéville, Meurthe-et-Moselle – 30 April 1986 in Tarascon, Bouches-du-Rhône) was the French Protestant founder of French Girl Guiding from 1916, then Head of the Pomeyrol Community from 1938.
