= Highdeal =

Former business software company

Highdeal is a French BSS software product company. Highdeal's flagship product, Highdeal Transactive, was a modular software suite. Highdeal was acquired by German software company SAP in June 2009.

== See also ==
- Telecommunications rating
- Operational Support Systems
