= Marta Trivi =

Spanish video game journalist for women's rights

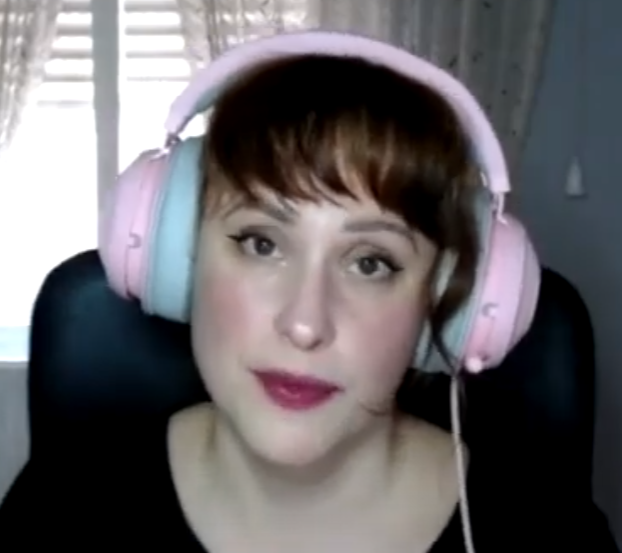
- Trivi in a 2020 interview
- Born: 1988 (age 37–38); Málaga, Spain
- Occupation: Journalist

Marta Trivi (born 1988) is a Spanish journalist specializing in covering video games and the role of women in that industry. She also has written about cinema and pop culture in general.

== Career ==
Born in Málaga, Spain, Trivi created in 2008 the weekly podcast Choquejuergas, which she hosts with Alberto Corona. The show discusses culture and has over eight seasons. From February 2018 to April 2023, she was the host of the Reload podcast and host of the Recarga Activa podcast (from June 2021 to May 2023), among others.

She is one of the authors of the book Super Mes Mini (2017), which compiles twenty-five articles on some of the most iconic games from the 16-bit Super Nintendo system (SNES).

In 2018, Trivi started as a writer for the video game industry website AnaitGames, a portal that she went on to direct. She was also a regular contributor to the cultural criticism portal Cultura caníbal.

She co-authored with Marina Amores to write the book ¡Protesto!: videojuegos desde una perspectiva de género (2018), the first set of essays in Spanish that addresses the prejudices and sexist attitudes faced by women in the sector (both users and professionals). With Amores she also collaborated in the documentary series Nerfeadas (2020) about sexism in video games, being a scriptwriter and one of the interviewers.

== Awards ==
She was recognized three times with awards voted by the DeVuego portal community: Best Media Director 2021; Best Web/Blog R/C 2022; and Best Web Editor 2023.

== See also ==
- Women and video games
