= Denis Buican =

Romanian-French scientist (1934–2025)

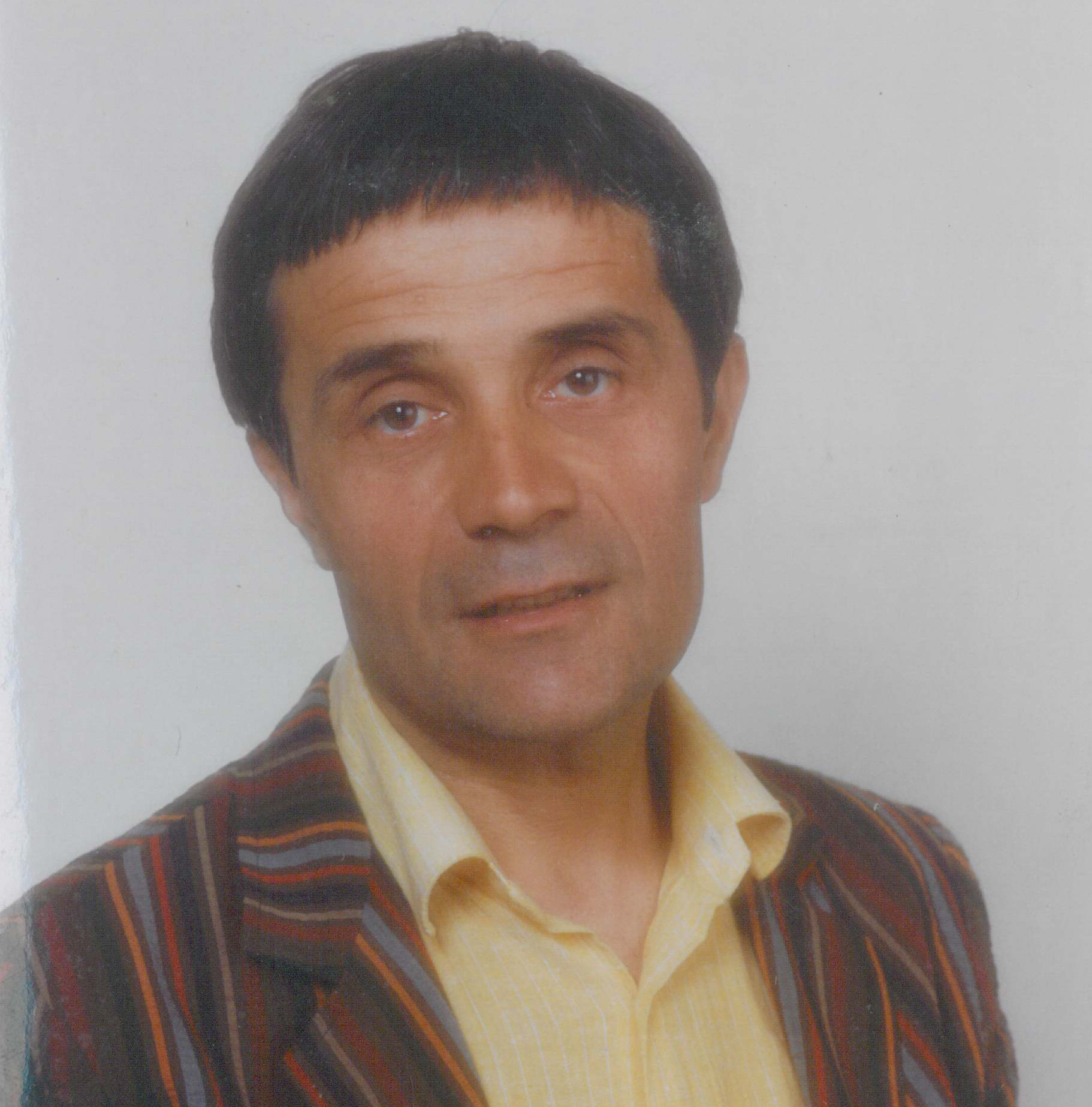
Denis Buican

Denis Buican (Dumitru Buican-Peligrad; 21 December 1934 – 15 November 2025) was a Romanian-French scientist, bilingual writer, biologist, philosopher and a historian of science. He studied genetics.

== Background ==
Buican was born in Bucharest. His father Dumitru Peligrad a boyar and philanthropist was placed under house arrest after the invasion of Romania by the Red Army (starting 23 August 1944), but he refused to submit to regular police checks. Although belonging to a class deemed "unhealthy" by the then communist regime, the young researcher was a brilliant undergraduate at the University of Bucharest.

Pioneer of Romanian radio-genetics (his first studies focused on the influence of electricity on the life of plants), agronomist (1956), Doctor (Ph.D.) in Genetics (1961), then a professor at the University of Bucharest, he fought theories of Lysenkoism, imposed by the ex-USSR in the former so-called "popular democratic" countries of Central and Eastern Europe. After 1948 his laboratories were destroyed three times and he was banned from the university in the late 1950s.

In his first book, published in Romanian, in 1969, General Biology, Genetics and Improvement, Denis Buican did not hesitate to formally confront Lysenkoism amidst repressive political and social campaigns undertaken in science and agriculture by the powerful Stalinist director Trofim Lysenko and his followers, starting year 1920.

== History of science ==
Naturalized French in 1972, he undertook a work of history and philosophy of science, embodied by his thesis of Doctor (Ph.D.) of State (1983), History of Genetics and Evolutionism in France, the first true history of this science published in France. In 1989, his book The Revolution of Evolution received a Grand Prize from the French Academy. In 1997, he presided over the "Biology and Medical Science" section of the twentieth International Congress of History of Science (Liege, Belgium).

Professor of history of science at the French University of Paris X-Nanterre (1983–2003), he is the author of a new theory of evolution, the "Synergistic Theory of Evolution".

== Publications ==
A writer in Romanian and French, Denis Buican published several collections of poems, in sensitivity close to poems written by Romanian poets Mihai Eminescu, Lucian Blaga and Tudor Arghezi. Haunted by nothingness, these short poems, very dense, open up a universe that is not unlike that of Romanian philosopher Emil Cioran.

== Romania's first radiobiology laboratory ==
In 1955, he founded the first radiobiology laboratory of Romania and, the following year, he graduated this university as an agricultural engineer. Fighting tirelessly Lysenkoism's theories (which caused to his lab to be destroyed three times: in 1956, 1960 and 1962), he continues his research on plants' resistance to cold and on the heterosis (or hybrid vigor) for hybrids of Zea mays (the maize). His works, which were initially the subject of a first doctorate (Ph.D.) thesis, in natural science (defended and published in Bucharest, Romania, in 1961), will be extended, completed and introduced, after his arrival in France, in a second doctoral thesis (defended and published at the Faculty of Sciences, in Paris, France, in 1970).

Theorist of biology, Denis Buican has developed a new model called "Synergistic Theory of Evolution". It updates and complements the previous "Synthetic Theory" having in view that the natural selection underlined by Charles Darwin is to be applied only to phenotype, so that certain phenomena (such as lethal mutations) were not sufficiently taken into account by this old model. Buican's theory and model have introduced "a new concept in the evolutionary and hereditary process - i.e the pre-selection genotyping" - which may be defined as "the natural operation which eliminates a priori, to genotype level, any genetic combination or mutation which is unfit for the survival of it" (The revolution of evolution, 1989). Guided by the "Systems Theory" of Ludwig von Bertalanffy, Buican's theory envisages synergistic multi-pole selection which would be able to act within every living (from the atom to human being).

== French teacher ==
Philosopher and historian of science visiting professor at the Sorbonne University (1969–1974), senior lecturer at the University of Dijon (1974–1980) and at the University of Paris I (1980–1983), Denis Buican teaches Philosophy and History of biological sciences, while preparing a third (state) doctoral thesis on the history of genetics in France, under the direction of Jacques Roger.

Philosopher of sciences, he redefines notably the place of chance in evolution, in departing positions adopted by Jacques Monod: beyond the absolute chance postulated by the Nobel Prize, he introduces an "oriented chance" (called "evolving orthodromic") and considers (in "Chance, necessity and logic of living", La Nouvelle Revue Française, 225, 1971) the opportunities to be offered by genetic manipulation – which will be confirmed by the first genetic engineering work done in 1974.

== New theory ==
Buican has also developed a new theory of knowledge, called Biognoséologie, which attempts to exceed the Kantian distinction between phenomena and noumènes (those "things by themselves" which, according to Immanuel Kant, can not be investigated by human beings): based on ethology's data and on advances in molecular biology, he considered the so-called "relative noumènes", which would likely capture a probable reality.

Historian, based on the epistemological model of Thomas Kuhn (The Structure of Scientific Revolutions, 1962), he also considered the introduction of genetics in France as a "run with obstacles": the science of heredity was accepted only in 1945, not without some resistance by biologists themselves, most of them being attached to Neo-Lamarckism. He is also the author of an essay, "The eternal return of Lysenko" (1978) dedicated to the interpretation of Lysenkoism: denouncing the theories of the philosopher Dominique Lecourt (author of the essay Lysenko published in 1976), which denied any liability to Marxism in the emergence then the triumph of Stalin's Lysenkoism theses. On the contrary he shows that the roots of Lysenkoism are to be found in the messianism and determinism of Marx and Engels.

Becoming a professor at University of Paris X – Nanterre, in 1983, Buican devoted most of his research on the history of Darwinism, evolution and genetics, he published many books.

== Respect for the individual ==
A free man without illusions about Western democracies - which he did not consider to be truly democratic and readily qualified them as being only "police- and plutocratic demagogies" - he calls, on contrary, for an open, meritocratic society, based on the principles of power separation and reciprocal control of powers (according to Montesquieu), on the respect for the individual value and on equal opportunities. Probabilistic, he wished that the human society will enable everyone to freely and fully develop her/ his hereditary potential. Very critical in respect to the French university system - which he readily denounces as having a clan structure, attitudes and behaviors - he considers that "a society aiming to be simultaneously equitable and efficient does require a selective - and even a micro-selective - educational system being able to offer to everyone, from cradle to the grave, the possibility to develop herself / himself without any discrimination of class or race, of religion or customs, as far as her/ his genetic heritage does allow." (The university as sacred mad cow of the Republic, Paris, F.-X. de Guibert, 2004, p. 127).

== Death ==
Buican died in Paris on 15 November 2025, at the age of 90.

== Bibliography ==
=== Epistemology and history of science ===
- General Biology, Genetics and Improvement, in collaboration with Bogdan Stugren, Bucharest, Didactic and Pedagogic Editions, 1969 (in Romanian).
- The Eternal Return of Lysenko, Paris, Copernicus, 1978 (translated into Italian, Armando Armando, 1983).
- Heredity and the Future of the Man, Paris, Serge Fleury, 1983.
- History of Genetics and Evolutionism in France, Paris, PUF, 1984. Preface by Pierre Chaunu.
- The Genetics and Evolution, Paris, PUF, Que sais-je?, 1986 reissue., 1993 (translated into Portuguese by Editions Europa America, 1987).
- Genetics and Evolutionary Thinking, Paris, SEDES, 1987.
- Darwin and Darwinism, Paris, PUF, Que sais-je?, 1987 reissue., 1994 (translated into Portuguese - Brazil - Editions Zahar, 1990, Turkish, Ilev, 1991 and Chinese, 1999).
- Lysenko and Lysenkoism, Paris, PUF, Que sais-je?, 1988.
- The Revolution of Evolution, Paris, PUF, 1989. Preface by Pierre Chaunu (translated into Romanian, Scientific Editions, 1994).
- The evolution and Evolutionism, Paris, PUF, Que sais-je?, 1989; reissued under the title The Darwinism and Evolutionism, Paris, Frisian-Roche, 2005.
- The biological explosion, La Garenne-Colombes, published by the European, 1991.
- Charles Darwin, Paris, Criterion, 1992 (translated into Italian, Armando Armando, 1996, Romanian, All editions, 1999).
- Mendel and genetics of yesterday and today, Paris, Criterion, 1993 (translated into Romanian, Ed. All, 1997).
- Biognoséologie. Evolution and revolution of knowledge, Paris, Kimé, 1993 (translated into Romanian, Ed. All, 1993).
- Jean Rostand, the iconoclastic patriarch of Ville d'Avray, Paris, Kimé, 1994.
- History of biology. Heredity-Evolution, Paris, Nathan, 1994 (translated into Spanish, Acento editorial, 1995, in Greek, Ed. Savalas, 1996, in Portuguese, Ed. Europa-America, 1996).
- Evolution of Biological Thought, Paris, Hachette, 1995.
- Evolution today, Paris, Hachette, 1995.
- Comparative Ethology, Paris, Hachette, 1995.
- Evolution, the great adventure of life, Paris, Nathan, 1995.
- Evolution and evolutionary theories, Paris, Masson, 1997.
- Dictionary of biology. Essentials, Paris, Larousse, 1997 (translated into Romanian, enciclopedic Universe, 2001, in Portuguese, Circulo de lettore, 2002).
- Proceedings of the XXth International Congress of History of Science (Liège, 20–26 July 1997). (ed. with D. Thieffry): Biological and Medical Sciences, Turnhout (Belgium), Brepols Publishers, 2002.
- The epic life. The evolution of the biosphere and human avatars, Paris, Frisian-Roche, 2003 (translated into Romanian, CD Press, 2004).
- The Odyssey of evolution, Paris, Ellipses, 2008.
- Darwin in the history of biological thought, Paris, Ellipses, 2008.
- Mendel in the history of genetics, Paris, Ellipses, 2008.
- Biology. History and philosophy, Paris, CNRS éditions, 2010.
- Evolution. History and controversies (co-author: Cédric Grimoult), Paris, CNRS éditions, 2011.
- Darwin and the Evolutionism's epic, Paris, Perrin, 2012.

=== Essays ===
- Dracula and his avatars – from Vlad the Impaler to Stalin and Ceausescu, La Garenne-Colombes, published by the European, 1991.
- The changing face of Dracula. The history and legend, Paris, Le Feline, 1993.
- The university as sacred mad cow of the Republic, Paris, François-Xavier de Guibert, 2004.
- Memoirs (A stormy life between East and West), Bucharest, CD Publishing Press, 2007.
- Secular Mosaic, Bucharest, CD Publishing Press, 2010.(French-Romanian edition)

=== Literary works ===
- Single Tree (poems), Price Cino del Duca, Paris, Pierre-Jean Oswald, 1974.
- Blind Light (poems), Paris, Editions Saint-Germain-des-Pres, 1976.
- Mamura (poems), Bucharest, Editura Demiurg, 1993. (in Romanian)
- SPICE - Old and New Poems, Bucharest, CD Publishing Press, 2006. (in Romanian)
- Black Jewellery, Bucharest, Bucharest, CD Publishing Press, 2008. (in Romanian)
- Torture wheel - Light wheel, Bucharest, CD Publishing Press, 2009. (French-Romanian edition)
