= Wilfred Monod =

French theologian (1867–1943)

William Frédéric Monod better known as Wilfred Monod (1867, Paris – 1943) was a Protestant Professor of theology associated to Paris and Rouen. He founded the Order of Watchers and was active in ecumenical efforts in France. He once suggested a desire for the rehabilitation of Marcion of Sinope and a removal of omnipotence and omnipresence from the conception of God. These ideas were quite controversial. He was also the father of Théodore Monod.

He was a Christian pacifist.
