= Jérôme Monod =

French business executive and political advisor

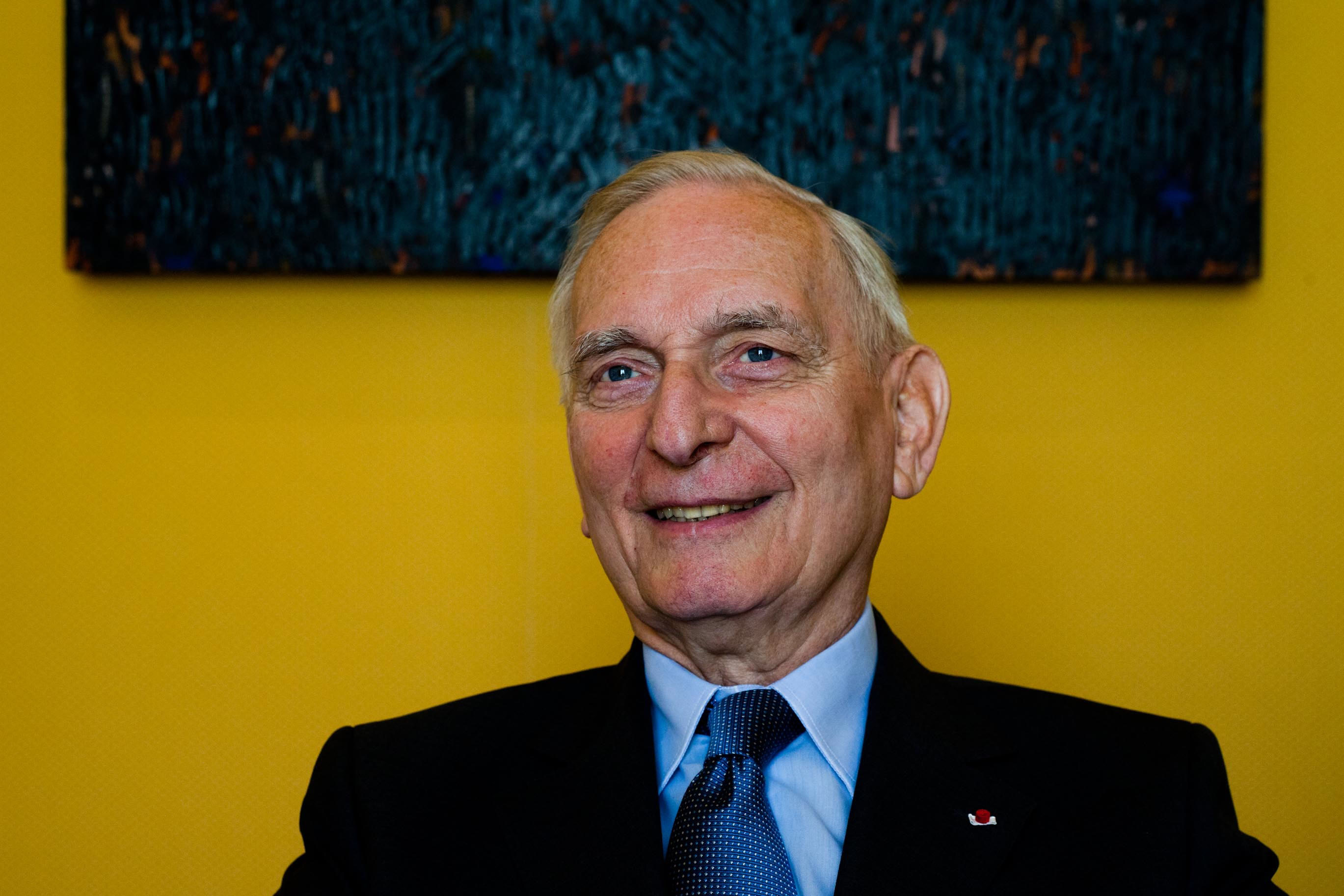
- Jérôme Monod in 2011
- Born: 7 September 1930; Paris, France
- Died: 18 August 2016 (aged 85); Lourmarin, Vaucluse, France
- Education: Lycée Buffon; Lycée Henri-IV
- Alma mater: Sciences Po; École nationale d'administration
- Occupations: Business executive Political advisor
- Spouse: Françoise Gallot
- Children: 3
- Relatives: Jacques Monod (cousin); Théodore Monod (cousin)

Jérôme Monod (7 September 1930 – 18 August 2016) was a French business executive and political advisor. He was the chairman of Lyonnaise des eaux, later known as Suez-Lyonnaise, from 1980 to 2000. He was an advisor to President Jacques Chirac. He was a co-founder of the Rally for the Republic and the Union for a Popular Movement, two center-right political parties in France.

== Early life ==
Jérôme Monod was born on September 7, 1930. He graduated from Sciences Po and the École nationale d'administration.

== Career ==
Monod started his career as a political advisor to Prime Minister Michel Debré in 1959. He later served as an advisor to ministers Olivier Guichard and Maurice Schumann. He served as the chairman of the Interministerial Delegation of Land Planning and Regional Attractiveness from 1968 to 1975. He served as an advisor to Prime Minister Jacques Chirac in 1975. With Chirac and others, he was a co-founder of the Rally for the Republic, a center-right political party, in 1976.

Monod joined Lyonnaise des eaux in 1979, and he became its chief executive in 1980. In the 1980s, he diversified the company portfolio by acquiring Sita, Degrémont, Pompes funèbres générales and BTP Dumez. He merged it with Suez in 1997. He served as the chairman of Suez-Lyonnaise until 2000.

Monod served as an advisor to President Jacques Chirac from 2002 to 2007. He was a co-founder of the Union for a Popular Movement in 2002. He served as the honorary chairman of the Fondation pour l'innovation politique, a center-right think tank.

== Personal life and death ==
Monod married Françoise Gallot who dies on November 19, 2002, the granddaughter of Henri Queuille. They had three children. He died on August 18, 2016, in Lourmarin, Vaucluse, France. He was 85 years old. He was buried in Lourmarin, where a private funeral was held on August 21, 2016. A public funeral was held at the L'Oratoire du Louvre in Paris.
