= Insurgency in the Maghreb (2002–present) =

Sunni Islamist insurgency in the Maghreb

- Part of the war on terror and the war against the Islamic State
- Map showing Salafist Group for Preaching and Combat area of operations (pink), member states of the Pan Sahel Initiative (dark blue), and members of the Trans-Saharan Counterterrorism Initiative (dark and light blue) as of 2011.
Date	11 April 2002 – present (24 years, 7 months)
Location	Maghreb, Sahara desert
Status	Ongoing; Insurgency in Algeria spreads through the Maghreb and in the Sahel; Islamic State and Al-Qaeda are defeated in Algeria, fighters flee into the Sahel; US-led Operation Enduring Freedom – Trans Sahara initiated in 2007; Islamists capture northern Mali in 2012, engaging in a civil war; Chaambi Operations and IS insurgency in Tunisia; IS captures territory in the Second Libyan Civil War, largely fought back by 2016; Al-Qaeda–Islamic State conflict

Belligerents
Algeria; Mauritania; Tunisia; Libya; Morocco; Multi-national coalitions: (United Nations) MINUSMA (until 2023); AFISMA (2012-2013); (European Union) EUTM Mali	Al-Qaeda and allies; AQIM (from 2007); Ansar al-Sharia (Tunisia) (2011–2022); Uqba ibn Nafi Brigade (2012–14); GSPC (until 2007); Ansar al-Sharia (Libya) (2012–17); Salafia Jihadia; Islamic State (from 2014); (Islamic State) Libya Province; (Islamic State) Wilayat al-Jazair; (Islamic State) Sahel Province; Uqba ibn Nafi Brigade (from 2014)

Commanders and leaders
(Algeria) Abdelmadjid Tebboune (from 2019); (Algeria) Nadir Larbaoui (2023–2025); (Algeria) Sifi Ghrieb (from 2025); (Mauritania) Mohamed Ould Ghazouani (from 2019); (Tunisia) Kais Saied (from 2019); (Libya) Abdul Hamid Dbeibeh (from 2021); (Morocco) Mohammed VI	Amari Saifi (POW); Nabil Sahraoui †; Abdelmalek Droukdel †; Abu Ubaidah Yusef al-Annabi; Abdelhamid Abou Zeid †; Mokhtar Belmokhtar †; Ahmed al Tilemsi †; Seifallah Ben Hassine †; Mohamed al-Zahawi †; Abu Hafs al-Hashimi al-Qurashi (Leader of IS); Abu al-Hussein al-Husseini al-Qurashi ‡‡; Abu al-Hasan al-Hashimi al-Qurashi ‡‡; Abu Ibrahim al-Hashimi al-Qurashi ‡‡; Abu Bakr al-Baghdadi X; Abu Nabil al-Anbari †; Adnan Abu Walid al-Sahrawi †

Strength
Total armed forces (unless specified): Algeria: 520,000; Mauritania: 15,870; Tunisia: 45,000; 6,000 deployed in Chaambi; Libya: 35,000; France: 5,100 deployed in the Sahel	AQIM (former GSPC): 1,000–4,000; Ansar al-Sharia (Tunisia): 1,000; Ansar al-Sharia (Libya): 5,000+; Salafia Jihadia: 700+; Islamic State; IS–LP: 5,000–10,000; IS–AP: <30

Casualties and losses
- Major conflict casualties: 2002: 1,100+ killed in Algeria; 2003: 1,162 killed in Algeria; 2004: 429 killed in Algeria; 2005: 488 killed in Algeria; 2006: 323 killed in Algeria; Algeria: 5,000+ total killed (2002–11); Libya: 10,071+ killed (2014–18), 20,000+ wounded (as of May 2015)

An Islamist insurgency is taking place in the Maghreb region of North Africa, followed on from the end of the Algerian Civil War in 2002. The Algerian militant group Salafist Group for Preaching and Combat (GSPC) allied itself with al-Qaeda to eventually become al-Qaeda in the Islamic Maghreb (AQIM). The Algerian and other Maghreb governments fighting the militants have worked with the United States and the United Kingdom since 2007, when Operation Enduring Freedom – Trans Sahara began.

While the 2011 Arab Spring affected support for the insurgency, it also presented military opportunities for the jihadists. In 2012, AQIM and Islamist allies captured the northern half of Mali. They held the territory for almost a year, until being forced out of the urban areas during a French-led foreign intervention, which was succeeded by the Sahel-wide Operation Barkhane. In Libya, the Islamic State was able to control some limited territory during the Second Libyan Civil War, amid allegations of local collaboration with its AQIM rival.

== Background ==
With the decline of the Armed Islamic Group of Algeria (GIA), the GSPC was left as the most active rebel group, with about 300 fighters in 2003. It continued an assassination campaign of police and army personnel in its area, and also managed to expand into the Sahara, where its southern division, led by Amari Saifi (nicknamed "Abderrezak el-Para", the "paratrooper"), kidnapped a number of German tourists in 2003, before being forced to flee to sparsely populated areas of Mali, and later Niger and Chad, where he was captured.

Some believe that el-Para actually works for the Algerian government. By late 2003, the group's founder had been supplanted by the even more radical Nabil Sahraoui, who announced his open support for al-Qaeda, thus strengthening government ties between the U.S. and Algeria. He was reportedly killed shortly afterwards, and was succeeded by Abu Musab Abdel Wadoud in 2004.

The GSPC has declared its intention to attack Algerian, French, and American targets. It has been designated as a Foreign Terrorist Organization by the U.S. Department of State, and similarly classed as a terrorist organization by the European Union.

== Overview ==
=== Insurgency in Algeria ===
The conflict with the GSPC continued to result in a significant number of casualties in Algeria, with over 1,100 killed in clashes with Islamist rebels in 2002. In 2003, a total 1,162 were killed in clashes in Algeria, followed by 429 killed in 2004, 488 killed in 2005, and 323 killed in 2006. In early 2006, the head of the Algerian national police claimed that terrorism had nearly been eliminated in the country, but significant attacks continued, and 2007 would eventually mark a height of suicide bombings and terrorist attacks in Algeria.

=== Broadening of conflict ===
In order to improve recruiting and funding, the GSPC aligned itself with al-Qaeda, and on 11 September 2006, al-Qaeda leader Ayman al-Zawahiri announced a union between the groups. The GSPC rebranded itself as al-Qaeda in the Islamic Maghreb (AQIM) in January 2007, signaling the broadened aspirations of the group.

The group now aimed to overthrow all North African governments deemed apostate, including those of Algeria, Libya, Mali, Mauritania, Morocco and Tunisia. Operations were shifted into two broader "sectors", Northern Algeria and Tunisia allocated a "central emirate", and northern Mali, Niger, Mauritania and Libya a "Sahara emirate" led by Djamel Okacha. The strategic leadership of AQIM continued to be headquartered in the mountainous region of Kabylie east of the Algerian capital Algiers, headed by a 14-member Shura council leadership.

As the Algerian counterterrorism campaign became largely successful in pushing AQIM out of the country, the group established new bases in Sahel countries such as Niger, Mauritania, Chad and Mali. Attacks against government and military installations were frequently underreported by Western media. In 2007, the United States and United Kingdom launched the Operation Enduring Freedom – Trans Sahara in support of governments in the region.

Frequent kidnappings of foreigners in 2008 led the Dakar Rally to be cancelled and permanently moved to South America.

=== Mauritania ===
In the earliest major attack as direct spillover of the Algerian conflict, the Mauritanian army base at Lemgheity was attacked by the GSPC in June 2005, killing 17 soldiers (and nine jihadists), and wounding another 17. The attack in part led to a coup d'état in October 2005 by Mohamed Ould Abdel Aziz, who made a campaign against jihadists a major part of his rule. Attacks continued in Mauritania until it was largely successful in thwarting attacks since 2011 following a major military boost and political openings for Islamists. AQIM has however continued to remain active in the eastern border-regions with Mali, with active support systems for logistics and information. A lack of military resources, often due to turmoil and having little population in a very large country, caused Mauritania to rely on support from France, Morocco, and Algeria in order to defeat the AQIM.

=== Tunisia ===
In December 2006 and again in January 2007, Tunisian security forces engaged in clashes with a group linked to the GSPC that had established training camps in mountainous areas near the capital Tunis, killing more than a dozen people. According to French daily Le Parisien at least 60 people were killed in the clashes. The clashes were the most serious terrorist activity in Tunisia since the Ghriba synagogue bombing in 2002.

Starting in 2012, AQIM along with Ansar al-Sharia and the Uqba ibn Nafi Brigade active in the mountainous Jebel ech Chambi region outside Kasserine near the Algeria–Tunisia border have been targeted by the Tunisian Army in the Chaambi Operations. In 2014, Uqba ibn Nafi Brigade militants attacked two Tunisian military checkpoints, killing fourteen Tunisian soldiers and injuring twenty-five in what was the deadliest military skirmish in Tunisia since its independence in 1956. Since 2015, Tunisia has simultaneously been targeted by an IS insurgency campaign. In March 2016 over 50 militants were killed when IS fighters attempted to seize Ben Guerdane near the Libya–Tunisia border.

=== Libyan Civil War ===
Since the Libyan Civil War in 2011, south-western Libya has offered sanctuaries to AQIM which has dispatched cells to be established in the region. On 11 September 2012, members of Ansar al-Sharia and AQIM were responsible for coordinated attacks against two United States government facilities in Benghazi, and Ansar al-Sharia was later involved in clashes in Benghazi in 2013. Drawing defectors from AQIM, the rival Islamic State (IS) organization was later able to control some limited territory in the north in the renewed civil war from 2014. After initial official support from AQIM, allegations have continued of local collaboration between the otherwise rivalling groups. After being pushed out of Derna, the remaining IS stronghold of Sirte was captured in late 2016. Al-Qaeda-affiliated Islamists led by Ansar al-Sharia have at the same time continued to exert control in other places.

== Timeline of events ==
=== 2002 ===
- Algerian Civil War with the GIA is considered to have ended in February 2002, GSPC continues insurgency.
- April 11 – Ghriba synagogue bombing killed 22 (14 German tourists, 5 Tunisians, and 2 French nationals and the suicide bomber).
- May 5 – 15 government soldiers are killed in an ambush near Tizi Ouzou, in the Kabylie region of northern Algeria. About 50 members of the Salafist Group for Preaching and Combat (GSPC) were blamed for the assault.
- June 23 – Militants killed 6 civilians in an attack on youths playing football near a bus station in Zéralda in suburban Algiers.
- July 17 – Militants killed 7 civilians in Ouled Allal, Bouïra Province. Bringing the death toll of the previous three days to 22.
- September 13 – Militants killed 11 civilians on a road in Aïn Defla Province, northern Algeria. The previous month, according to a toll compiled from press reports and official accounts, an estimated 140 people were killed in extremist violence, bringing the number of people who had been killed since the beginning of the year to 1,070.
- September 19 – 15 people are reported to have been arrested in Kabylie under suspicion of providing money and logistical help to the GSPC.
- October 2 – Militants killed 13 civilians in a remote village in Aïn Defla Province, western Algeria.

=== 2003 ===
- January 6 – Militants ambushed a military convoy in north-east Algeria killing 43 soldiers and wounding 19 others. Also militants attacked families near the capital, Algiers, killing 13 people.
- Between February 22 and March 24 – The Free Salafist Group (GSL), a splinter group of the GSPC led by Amari Saïfi (Abderrazak "El Para"), allegedly captures 32 European tourists in southern Algeria.
  - On May 13, 17 hostages are released and 2 militants are killed in a gun battle in the Algerian desert. The remaining fighters, with 15 hostages, flee to northern Mali. After receiving a purported €5 million ransom paid by the German government, the GSL/GSPC releases the 14 remaining hostages on August 19. The fifteenth hostage, a German, died of heat exhaustion.
- May 16 – 2003 Casablanca bombings killed 45 including 12 suicide-bombers.
- September – Nabil Sahraoui was reported to have replaced Hassan Hattab as leader of the GSPC but other media reports have denied that any change has taken place.
- November 27 – In Messad, Djelfa Province, Algeria, a well-known poet and member of the extended Royal Saudi family was killed and 4 others were injured in an apparent terrorist attack, according to press reports.

=== 2004 ===
- May 2 – It was reported that in the previous two days 7 members of the security forces, 6 civilians and 2 militants were killed in several locations: near Algiers and in the provinces of Medea, Bouira and Relizane.
- May 18 – 2 bombs exploded, killing 2 soldiers and wounding 13 people, including 4 soldiers, in Setif in eastern Algeria.
- June 2 – Fighters ambushed an Algerian military convoy in Béjaïa in eastern Algeria, killing 10 soldiers and wounding 45 others.
- June 28 – The Algerian army killed three Islamic extremists in a raid near the capital, Algiers.
- September 20 – Militants killed 4 people at a roadblock they set up near Kalous in Bouira Province.
- September 29 – Militants attacked a civil defense post near the city of Ain Defla, killing 6 members of the civil defense force.
- October 22 – Militants attacked a vehicle near Médéa carrying fans to a football match in the capital Algiers, killing 16 people.

=== 2005 ===
- April 9 – Militants killed 14 people at a mock roadblock near Algier. In addition another 36 people, including 15 security force members have been killed since the start of March.
- April 25 – Mauritania dismantled its first domestic jihadist cell in the suburbs of Nouakchott.
- May 15 – Fighters ambushed an army convoy in the region of Khenchela killing 12 soldiers.
- June 4 – Militants attacked a Mauritanian army barracks, killing 17 soldiers, injuring 17, and capturing 35, with around 5–9 militants killed.
- June 13 – An explosive device kills 3 soldiers and 3 civilians west of Tipaza.
- June 18 – An explosive device killed a policeman during a police raid in El-Djer.
- June 23 – An explosive device kills 11 policeman on the road linking Azzefoune and Aghrib in the province of Tizi Ouzou.
- July 18 – Islamist militants killed 5 policemen in an ambush in Ain Defla in western Algeria.
- September 25 – Militants killed 5 members of the security forces. Three days before, 7 soldiers and 3 civilians were killed in two other attacks. Since the beginning of the month, another 16 soldiers, 12 civilians and 1 policeman were killed. The attacks took place in Boumerdes Province and close to Saida.

=== 2006 ===
- February 1 – The Algerian daily Liberté reports that spiritual leader Ahmed Abou al-Baraa (real name Ahmed Zarabib) has been killed by Algerian government forces in the mountains near Toudja on January 17.
- March 30 – Hassan Hattab, a founder of the group, is reported to have called on its remaining members to accept an amnesty offered by the Algerian government.
- April 7 – Fighters ambushed a government convoy in the desert region of Ghardaïa in Algeria carrying customs agents killing 31 people.
- April 26 – A suicide bomber attacked the base of the Multinational Forces and Observers at al-Jura wounding two members of the force.
- June 21 – The Algerian army killed 10 Islamists in Ghzerwal, near Boumerdes.
- June 26 – The Algerian army killed 19 Islamists in the eastern region of Khenchela, bringing the number of people killed since the start of the latest unrest in Algeria to 53, including 36 suspected Islamists. Among the dead were also 7 soldiers killed on June 21 and 5 civilians killed on June 20.
- July 7 – At least 3 soldiers were wounded after an explosive device blast in Mount Bouhench, Jijel, Algeria. The attack was claimed by Aibed Er-Rahman katibet.
- July 20 – Fighters killed 4 government municipal guards near Ain Defla. The attack followed a similar one on July 12 when 5 guards were killed near Tipaza.
- August 29 – Fighters attacked a checkpoint in El-Kseur in Béjaïa Province, killing 2 policemen and 1 civilian.
- September 14 – al-Qaeda announced it will join the GSPC in their fight against France. They plan to attack France, the United States, and their allies.
- September 2 – In separate clashes 6 soldiers were killed in the regions of Béjaïa and Medea.
- October – A series of truck bombs exploded in Algiers killing 3 and wounding 24.
- November 3 – 15 militants ambushed an army patrol in the Ain Defla region killing 8 soldiers.
- November 9 – Militants ambushed an army patrol in the Bouira region killing 7 soldiers and wounding 13.
- December 10 – A bomb tore apart a bus carrying foreign oil workers in Algiers, killing 4 and wounding 18.

=== 2007 ===
- January – Tunisia said it killed 12 GSPC militants while losing two security men. The militants allegedly planned to attack the U.S. and British embassies in Tunis.
- January 5 – Fighters killed 18 soldiers in an ambush in the region of Biskra.
- January 21 – A roadside bomb exploded under an army vehicle near Jijel in eastern Algeria killing a soldier and wounding another 8.
- January 30 – 5 soldiers and 10 Islamists were killed in fighting in the eastern region of Batna.
- February 6 – The United States began Operation Enduring Freedom – Trans Sahara in partnership with the United Kingdom and a number of partner states in the Sahel region.
- February 13 – 7 bombs exploded at 7 police stations in the Kabylie region killing 2 policemen and 4 civilians.
- March 3 – A bomb hits a convoy of Russian pipeline workers between the towns of Médéa and Ain Defla, killing 4 Russians and 7 Algerians.
- Between March 11 and April 14 – The 2007 Casablanca bombings killed 8.
- April 7 – 13 soldiers and 19 Islamists were killed in fighting in a wooded area in the Aïn Defla Province.
- April 11 – A suicide attack at the entrance of the Ministry of Interior killed more than 24 people and wounded 300.
- May 11 – In various incidents 6 Islamists, 1 soldier and 1 policeman were killed near Tizi Ouzou, Saida and Jijel.
- May 13 – A bomb exploded at a police checkpoint in Constantine, Algeria, killing a policeman and wounding 2.
- May 14 – 20 militants were killed in clashes near the capital, Algiers.
- July 11 – A suicide truck bomber attacked a military barracks near Bouira, killing 10 soldiers and wounding 45.
- September 3 – During clashes in the Tebessa region 5 security forces members and a civilian were killed.
- September 5 – 7 militants were killed when the army bombed a suspected militant hideout in the Tebessa region.
- September 12 – A US C-130 plane was attacked by a machine gun emplacement. The plane reached its destination in Mali and nobody was injured. Since the beginning of OEF-TS, 100 AQIM members have been killed by security forces with 261 noncombat fatalities.
- September 15 – A bomb exploded in front of a police compound in Zemmouri, near Boumerdes, killing 3 people and wounding 5 others.
- September 22 – A suicide bomber wounded 9 people, including 2 Frenchmen and an Italian, in an attack in Lakhdaria, in the Bouira Province.
- October 9 – In clashes in Kabylie, 3 militants, including the GSPC deputy leader, were killed.
- October 15 – In fighting in the Tizi Ouzou province 3 militants were killed.
- November 16 – Algerian forces killed the treasurer of al-Qaeda in Algeria, Abdelhamid Sadaoui, also known as Abou el Haythem, near Tizi Ouzou.
- December 11 – 2 suicide truck bombers attacked U.N. offices in Algiers, killing 37 people and injuring 171. The United Nations Security Council officially condemned this attack.
- December 24 – Four French tourists were killed by gunmen in Mauritania and a fifth seriously injured. The victims were all part of the same family.
- December 27 – Three Mauritanian soldiers were killed in an ambush by AQIM near El Ghallaouiya, a fort in the remote northern desert.

=== 2008 ===
- February 1 – At least three alleged AQIM gunmen attacked the Israeli embassy in Nouakchott, Mauritania, injuring three bystanders.
- Al Qaeda's wing in north Africa claimed to have killed 120 Algerian soldiers and wounded 530 in clashes in its eastern stronghold, where the army has launched a campaign against the rebels. In an Internet statement posted on March 8, 2008, the group denied a newspaper report that 25 of its fighters had been killed and played down reports its leader had been surrounded.
- April – An armed confrontation in Nouakchott, Mauritania followed the escape of a key suspect linked to earlier AQIM-related attacks, triggering a large security operation.
- June 6 – A roadside bomb killed six soldiers and wounded four in Cap Djenat. The bombing came a day after a suicide bomber targeted a military barracks in an eastern Algiers suburb but killed only himself.
- June 8 – 2 bombs in quick succession rocked a train station in Beni Amrane, about 100 kilometres (60 mi) east of Algiers. The first bomb killed a Frenchman working on a renovation project at the station along with his driver. The second bomb came about five minutes later hitting the first responders and killing 8 soldiers and 3 firefighters.
- June 11 – A Moroccan court convicted a cell of 29 recruiters and sentenced them to prison.
- July 2 – Moroccan forces arrested 35 Al Qaeda recruiters.
- July 14 – A leader of Al-Qaida in Algeria was killed in a security forces raid.
- July 23 – A suicide bomber on a motorcycle blew himself up, injuring 13 members of a military convoy in Lakhdaria, Algeria.
- August 3 – A suicide bomber directed a vehicle against a police station in Tizi Ouzou, Algeria, injuring 25 people.
- August 8 – The Algerian army killed 12 jihadists in an ambush near Beni Douala, Algeria.
- August 10 – A suicide bomber drove a van loaded with explosives into the gendarmerie brigade in Boumerdès, Algeria, killing eight people and injuring 19.
- August 19 – A suicide car-bomber attacked a police academy in Les Issers as recruits lined up in front of the building, 43 people were killed, only one of them a policeman. This attack was officially condemned by the United Nations Security Council.
- August 20 – 2 car bombs exploded at a hotel in Bouira killing 11 civilians a day after the car bomb attack in Les Issers.
- September 14 – 12 Mauritanian soldiers were killed in an ambush in the village of Tourine in northern Mauritania.

=== 2009 ===
- January 19 – The bubonic plague infected and killed at least 40 members of AQIM in a training camp.
- January 22 – Gunmen abducted a Swiss couple, a German woman, and a British man in Niger. In February, Al-Qaeda in the Maghreb claimed to have abducted the four tourists as well as Canadian diplomat Robert Fowler in December. Fowler and three others were released in April while the British man, Edwin Dyer, was executed in June.
- February 22 – Militants attack a gas installation at the Ziama Mansouriah commune in the coastal province of Jijel, killing 9 security guards in the deadliest strike since August.
- June 17 – 18 gendarmerie troops and a civilian were killed in an attack on a military convoy near Bordj Bou Arréridj, about 200 kilometres (125 mi) southeast of Algiers. Local sources said that the soldiers were returning after escorting to base a group of Chinese workers building the future motorway intended to cross the whole of the north African country from east to west.
- June 23 – American aid worker and teacher Christopher Leggett, was shot and killed in Nouakchott, Mauritania, by gunmen near his workplace. AQIM claimed responsibility, citing accusations of proselytizing.
- July 30 – At least 14 Algerian security guards were killed in an ambush by alleged Islamic fighters.
- August 9 – 2009 Nouakchott suicide bombing.
- October 8 – 2 brothers suspected of links to AQIM were arrested in France. One of the two was a CERN researcher.
- November 26 – Frenchman Pierre Camatte was kidnapped in Ménaka, Mali by al-Qaeda.
- November 29 – Spanish aid workers Roque Pascual, Albert Vilalta, and Alicia Gamez were kidnapped on a coastal road in Mauritania. Gamez was released in March 2010, while Pascual and Vilalta was released in August 2010.
- December 19 – An Italian and his wife from Burkina Faso were kidnapped in eastern Mauritania. They were released on April 19, 2010.
- December 28 – 3 Saudi tourists were killed and 3 others injured in an attack near Djambala, Niger. A fourth Saudi died two days later.

=== 2010 ===
- January 29 – A bomb exploded at the passage of a freight train loan Timezrit. Nobody was injured.
- March 8 – At least 5 soldiers were killed close to Niger's border with Mali, in a sunrise ambush in which rebels attacked a convoy with rockets and machine gun fire at an isolated border post.
- March 21 – 3 militants were killed by security forces near El Ma Labiod, 35 km from Tebessa.
- March 25 – 2 soldiers were killed and five others wounded in an attack in the city of Kadiria.
- March 26 – 3 militants were killed while another was captured by security forces in Ait Yahia Moussa, 30 km from Tizi Ouzou.
- April 1 – A bomb attack against a taxi killed 2 people in Tizi-Ouzou. Another attack against a police patrol resulted in no injuries.
- April 3 – 7 security officers and a soldier were killed in a double bomb attack in the region of Béjaïa. 2 other soldiers were wounded in the second explosion.
- April 14 – According to Algerian officials, at least 10 militants were killed since a counter-terrorist operation started in Bordj Bou Arreridj raion. The operation is ongoing. Top militant Abdelmalek Droukdel could be surrounded with other militants, a military spokesman said.
- April 23 – At least 9 policemen were killed and another was slightly wounded when a bomb exploded in Irraguern (between Béjaïa and Jijel) while they were passing by. No other details have been reported.
- April 28 – A fierce gunbattle between Algerian army and a group of militants occurred near Tidjellabine (2 km from Boumerdes). It is known that one soldier was killed, but the counter-terrorist operation was still going on according to Algerian officials.
- May 2 – One militant was killed in a clash with Algerian forces in a forest between Akfadou and Adekar. "He was wearing an old military jacket (...) he was killed on the spot" a military spokesman said. "The counter-terrorist operation is still going on" he added. This heavily forested area is often the scene of clashes between militants from Al Qaeda in the Islamic Maghreb (AQIM, former GSPC) and Algerian army.
- May 4 – 3 militants, including the emir of "Takhoukht Jamaat" Zakaria Abdelkahar, were killed by security forces in Draa El Mizen (45 km from Tizi-Ouzou). It was reported that the authorities demanded them to stop their car and to surrender, but they refused and were killed. Several weapons and a large amount of ammunition were discovered in the car. No other details have been reported.
- May 9 – 2 people including a child were killed in an ambush in Kabylie. Another person is missing.
- June 7 – 2 people were killed and a third critically injured in a bomb attack near Derguina.
- June 11 – A suicide car bomb directed by a suicide bomber against a fixed barrier of the gendarmerie in Ammal resulted in 8 dead, including 3 policemen, four civilians and a Chinese national. Thus a score of wounded including 10 policemen and 10 civilians. At least three terrorists were killed during the violent clash that occurred after the blast.
- June 24 – 5 people were killed and one wounded by gunfire during a wedding at douar Ghrab near Tébessa.
- July 1 – 11 policemen were killed in an ambush in the city of Tinzaouatine. This attack was claimed by AQIM.
- July 4 – 3 policemen killed by a bomb on a road near Jijel by suspected Islamists.
- July 14 – 4 soldiers were killed and 13 others wounded in several bomb attacks.
- July 22 – Six militants were killed in a Franco-Mauritanian raid against a camp of Al-Qaeda in Mali to try to free the hostage Michel Germaneau.
- July 25 – One person was killed and 10 wounded in a suicide attack against a police brigade in Tizi-Ouzou, Algeria.
- July 26 – A few days after AQIM claimed he was executed in reprisal against the French-Mauritanian raid, the French president confirms the death of 78-year-old French volunteer aid worker Michel Germaneau, who had been kidnapped on April 21. It cannot be ruled out that he died as a result of running out of heart drugs.
- August 7 – The mayor of the town of Baghlia, Mohammed Idir, was murdered when he went to the mosque.
- August 20 – An attack against a military convoy near Baghlia killed 13 people and injured at least two.
- August 22 – A former terrorist was assassinated by bullets in the town of Baghlia in Algeria.
- August 25 – AQIM carried out a suicide car bombing against a Mauritanian military barracks in Néma, injuring three soldiers.
- August 30 – A suicide car bomb against a military convoy left 3 dead and at least 20 wounded in the town of Zemmouri in Kabylie.
- September 16 – Gunmen abduct five Frenchmen, a Togolese, and a Malagasy from a uranium mine in northern Niger.
- September 17 – A battle between Mauritanian army and members of Al-Qaeda killed at least 6 members of the army and 12 militants.
- October 3 – Five soldiers were killed and ten others injured in a bomb attack against their convoy in Zekri, a town of Kabylie, during a search operation.
- October 12 – A departmental head in public works, his two collaborators and two contractors were killed in a bomb attack in Tlidjene.
- October 25 – 1 soldier was killed and four others wounded by a bomb explosion in the passage their patrol in the Boumerdes region.

=== 2011 ===
- January 4 – An attack against the embassy of France in Mali's capital Bamako resulting in 1 injuries. This is the first such attack on Malian territory.
- January 7 – Two French citizens were kidnapped in Niamey, Niger and died in Mali while French troops were attempting to rescue them. AQIM declared on 15 January that it had executed one of them while the other one was killed by the French military. A post-mortem examination established that one of them received a direct shot, while the other one was killed by the "thermal effects of fire".
- January 29 – A member of the municipal guard was killed and three others wounded in an attack against the headquarters of the communal guard in the southwest of Tizi Ouzou.
- February 1–2 – AQIM attempted a coordinated truck-bomb attack in Nouakchott targeting the president and the French Embassy, but Mauritanian forces intercepted the vehicles and stopped the plot, killing the attackers.
- March 9 – An attack near Djelfa left 5 dead, in what appeared to be a response to the death of Abou Tourab, a leader of AQIM.
- April 17 – 20 Algerian soldiers were killed and twenty-two injured in three attacks claimed by Al Qaeda. Eleven militants were also killed.
- April 28 – 2011 Marrakesh bombing. A remote controlled bomb explode in Argana café, on Jemaa el-Fnaa square. Amongst the dead are 7 French national, 2 Canadians and a Dutch.
- April 29 – The explosion of a bomb in the town of Oued Djemaa has killed five communal guards who went to their place of work.
- May 6 – A bomb that exploded at the passage of a military convoy killed five soldiers and wounded five other in a region of Jijel. Since April 15 and the address to the nation of Abdelaziz Bouteflika there were fifty deaths in Islamist attacks.
- May 4 – Four policemen were killed in a bomb attack on the road between Tizi-Ouzou, the main town of Kabylie, in Algiers the capital of the country.
- May 6 – Three soldiers were killed and two others wounded by gunmen in the region of Jijel. One was initially killed by firing a gun, the others were killed by a bomb attack.
- May 12 – Seven soldiers were killed and three terrorists killed in an attack against a military outpost in the region of Jijel, Algeria. An eighth member is missing and two were wounded in the attack with machine guns and Assault rifles, perpetrated in Tizrarane.
- June 24 – Malian and Mauritanian forces launch a joint offensive against AQIM positions in the Wagadou Forest near Nara, Mali, destroying a jihadist base and killing multiple militants.
- July 5 – Clashes between Mauritanian forces and AQIM near Bassikounou, Mauritania, resulting in militant casualties and detainees.
- July 16 – Four people were killed and twenty injured in attacks, including two attacks by suicide bombers in the east of Algiers. In addition near the Tunisian border, two gunmen were killed.
- August 14 – A suicide bombing against a police station injured more than 30 in the city of Tizi Ouzou, Similarly, two people were killed in a double bomb attack targeting a police station in Bordj Menaiel.
- August 17 – A soldier was killed and five injured in a bomb attack in the town of Thenia.
- August 22 – A soldier was killed and two others wounded in the explosion of a roadside bomb in Taourga. In addition, two officers from the Hasnaoui were murdered and a young civilian was hit by bullets.
- August 24 – One militant was wounded and policemen recovered two Kalashnikovs in a clash near Tizi-Ouzou.
- August 27 – A suicide attack against the Military Academy Cherchell, a hundred kilometers west of Algiers, killed 18 people, 16 officers and two civilians and wounded 20 others. The attack occurred less than ten minutes after breaking the fast of Ramadan.
- September 27 – 5 men suspected of funding AQIM were arrested by Spanish police. Since 2004, over 400 suspected AQIM members have been arrested by Spain.
- October 23 – Two Spaniards and an Italian were abducted near Tindouf in western Algeria. The Spaniards were identified as Ainhoa Fernandez de Rincon, a pro-Sahrawi activist, and Enric Gonyalons, a member of the Basque non-profit group Mundubat. The Italian was named as Rossella Urru from Rome-based Comitato Italiano Sviluppo dei Popoli. The three were freed on July 18, 2012.
- November 23 – Gunmen kidnapped two French workers in Hombori, Mali.
- November 25 – Gunmen killed a German tourist and kidnapped a Swede, a Dutchman and a British/South African in Timbuktu, Mali.
- December 20 – Militants from AQIM attacked a Mauritanian gendarmerie post in Adel Bagrou and kidnapped a gendarme.

=== 2012 ===
- January 16 – The start of the Mali Civil War.

=== 2013 ===
- January 16 – In Aménas hostage crisis in Algeria.

=== 2014 ===
- April 19 – AQIM militants killed eleven soldiers in the Tizi Ouzou region of Algeria, east of Algiers. It was one of the deadliest attacks on the Algerian military in several years.
- September 14 – Jund al-Khilafah leader Khaled Abu-Suleiman announces the group's split from al-Qaeda in the Islamic Maghreb, and pledges allegiance to Abu Bakr al-Baghdadi, leader of the Islamic State.
- September 21 – Hervé Gourdel is abducted by Jund al-Khilafah in the Djurdjura National Park in Algeria.
- September 22 – Jund al-Khilafah releases a video showing Hervé Gourdel being held captive. The group stated that the kidnapping was in response to France conducting Airstrikes against "Islamic State" and threatened to behead him if France continued to carry out airstrikes against IS.
- September 24 – The group releases a video purporting to show the beheading of Hervé Gourdel. The militants shown stated that the beheading was in response to the order of IS spokesman Abu Mohammed al-Adnani, in which he called on followers to attack citizens of member nations of the anti-IS coalition.
- October – One of the Jund al-Khilafah militants responsible for the beheading of Hervé Gourdel was killed in an Algerian military operation in October.
- December 11 – The Algerian justice ministry states that Algerian soldiers had killed two Jund al-Khilafah members believed to have been involved in the murder of Hervé Gourdel.
- December 20 – Algerian soldiers kill three Jund al-Khilafah members in the mountains near Sidi Daoud.
- December 22 – Jund al-Khilafah leader Abdelmalek Gouri and two other militants were killed by the Algerian army in a military operation in Issers. Afterwards, troops recovered two automatic rifles, explosive belts, and a large amount of ammunition and mobile phones.

=== 2015 ===
- March 19 – The Bardo National Museum attack in Tunis killed 21, mostly foreign tourists.
- March 28 – Tunisian Special Forces killed Khaled Chaieb, leader of Okba Ibn Nafaa Brigade along with 8 more militants in Sidi Aïch, Gafsa Governorate south west of Tunisia.
- April 28 – The Algerian military killed 5 Jund al-Khilafah militants, in an ambush in the region of Tizi Ouzou, east of Algiers.
- May 20 – Algerian security forces ambushed a Jund al-Khilafah meeting east of Algiers, killing at least 21 fighters and capturing two others.
- June 26 – The Sousse attacks at the resort at Port El Kantaoui killed 39 European tourists, mostly British citizens.
- July 17 – At least 9 Algerian soldiers were killed in an ambush by AQIM militants in the south of Aïn Defla province, southwest of Algiers.
- November 25 – IS has claimed responsibility for bombing a bus carrying members of Tunisia's presidential guard killing 12.

=== 2016 ===
- January 4 – 7 Libyan guards were killed and 25 wounded at the oil port of Es Sider.
- January 7 – 47–70 People are killed and dozens more injured when explosions were set off at a Libyan Coast Guard training camp in the city of Zliten.
- February 20 – Jund al-Khilafah claimed to have killed three Algerian soldiers in Mount Shakshut in Bouira in late February. This claim was denied by the Algerian government.
- March 7 – Morocco's Interior Ministry says it dismantled a five-member IS group cell planning to detonate explosives in crowded public spaces. Also 43 militants, one soldier and four citizens they killed and six militants arrested after IS in Libya Jihadists attacked a border town in Libya-Tunisia border.
- March 9 – 10 militants and 1 soldier killed in the ongoing raid of Libyan-Tunisian border. Also, the African Union confirmed that will send a mission to northern Mali in the next of the months to look into setting up a counter-terrorism force to support vulnerable U.N. peacekeepers.
- March 10 Three IS fighters are killed in Libya-Tunisia border during ongoing classes.
- March 18 – A gas facility in the Algerian desert has been attacked by AQIM, though no one was hurt, Norwegian oil giant Statoil has said.
- March 24 – Morocco captured 9 operatives of Islamic State – Libya Province inside the Moroccan territory.
- March 28 – 18 Algerian soldiers killed in an airplane crash in the Tamanrasset region. It is unknown if the crash was because of terrorist attack or a technical problem.
- March 31 – AQIM in Tunisia, has claimed an attack on Tunisian border guards near the town of Bouchebka on the Algerian border, wounding some soldiers. A Mali intelligence spokesman says special forces have arrested a jihadi leader close to Islamic extremist group Ansar Dine in southern Mali.
- April 5 – 4 AQIM soldiers killed in Algeria near the Tunisian border.
- April 18 – Spanish police said they had detained a Moroccan man in the Mediterranean island resort of Palma de Mallorca suspected of recruiting militants for IS.
- April 29 – Algerian government said that it killed five AQIM fighters in two separate raid in eastern Algeria.
- May 6 – Tunisian forces capture 9 AQIM militants in the Tunisian countryside.
- May 7 – Brother of Abdelhamid Abaaoud jailed by Morocco court over terrorist accusations.
- May 11 – Two suspected ISIL members killed along with four Tunisian soldiers after a raid on Tunisian capital.
- August 29 – In Atlas Mountains nearby Algeria 3 Tunisian soldiers were killed and 7 others wounded by AQIM militants
- October 9 – In Tamalous, Algeria IS militants detonated an explosive device adjacent to the army convoy as it passed near Tamalous town in northeastern Algeria. It was not immediately clear whether the explosion caused any casualties.
- October 28 – A police officer was killed by three assailants while eating in a restaurant in the Constantine District in Constantine Province, around 390 kilometres (240 mi) east of Algiers. Islamic State organization claimed responsibility for the attack.
- November 5: A Tunisian soldier has been killed in his home in Governorate Kasserine, Tunisia by extremists.
- December 2 – Several women committed suicide bombings that killed four Libyan soldiers and two other women. The victims had previously granted them safe passage to leave buildings under the control of Islamic State militants in Sirte, Libya.
- December 5 – Terrorists launched two suicide vehicles towards army lines. 9 soldiers were killed in Benghazi, Libya .
- December 7 – Terrorists launched a "double-tap" car bombing outside the Benghazi headquarters of Saiqa Special Force. The two blasts appear to have killed nobody outright but left 22 people injured.
- December 18 – At least seven people were killed and eight wounded when a suicide bomber targeted forces loyal to Libya's eastern government in Benghazi.

=== 2017 ===
- January 1 – A bomb killed a child and injured 7 others in Blida, Algeria.
- January 20 – A car bomb exploded on Friday near a mosque in Libya's second city of Benghazi, killing one person and wounding 13 people including a former interior minister, medical and security sources said.
- January 21 – A car bomb exploded in Tripoli. The blast, which left at least two people dead, struck near the recently re-opened Italian embassy.
- February 26 – Police killed a suicide bomber heading for their commissariat in Constantine, Algeria. The explosion of the explosive belt caused two wounded.
- March 12 – A police officer and two militants were killed in a shootout at a checkpoint in southern Tunisia that left three other officers injured.
- May 7 – Two fighters from Third Force of Libya were killed and three others were wounded in an IS attack.
- May 18 – Brak al-Shati Airbase raid: At least 141 soldiers and civilians were killed in an attack in Southern Libya.
- May 19 – The head of eastern Libya's largest tribe and other man were killed on Friday when a car bomb exploded outside a mosque on the outskirts of Benghazi, according to a Libyan security official.
- June 19 – 4 militants and 2 EU staff, including one Portuguese soldier, were killed in an engagement at Hotel Le Campement Kangaba, an official safe zone for the EU mission in the Malian capital of Bamako.

=== 2018 ===
- January 20 – A Tunisian special operations unit ambushed and killed two commanders of Okba Ibn Nafaa, AQIM's Tunisia branch, in the mountains outside Sbeitla, near the Algerian border. Tunisian authorities identified the men as Bilel Kobbi and Bechir Ben Neji.
- January 26 – Algerian special forces killed eight AQIM commanders in the rugged mountainous area of Chechar in the eastern region of Khenchela. The men were said to have been en route to meet other jihadist leaders, including AQIM leader Abdelmalek Droukdel.

=== 2019 ===
- July 14 – Five people were arrested by the Algerian army during counterterrorist raids in Batna. Those arrested were accused of plotting attacks on the recent protests in the country.
- October 14 – An Islamist stabbed to death a French tourist while wounding a Tunisian soldier in Bizerte, Tunisia.
- October 20 – A leader of AQIM's Tunisian branch Okba Ibn Nafa'a was killed in the Kasserine region of Tunisia, on the border with Algeria.

=== 2020 ===
- February 9 – A suicide car bomb attack in Timiaouine, Algeria, left one Algerian soldier dead.
- March 6 – Two militants on a motorbike blew themselves up outside the US embassy in Tunisia, killing a policeman and injuring five more.
- June 21 – A security operation in Algeria's central region of Aïn Defla left one Algerian soldier dead following an ambush.
- June 27 – A bomb exploded during a sweep operation by the Algerian military in Médéa Province, south of Algiers, killing two soldiers, including an officer.
- December 17 – Algerian authorities captured Rezkane Ahcene, known as 'Abu Dahdah', who joined terrorist groups in 1994, in Jijel Province.

=== 2021 ===
- January 2 – Two Algerian military personnel and four militants were killed in a clash in Tipaza province.
- January 8 – Tunisian authorities arrested five members including a senior leader from the Okba Ibn Nafaa brigade, part of al Qaeda.
- January 14 – Five civilians were killed in the Telidjane district, Algeria when their car was hit with an IED and destroyed.
- February 3 – Four Tunisian soldiers were killed when their vehicle hit a landmine near Mount Mghila on the Algerian border.

=== 2023 ===
- March 5 – Four jihadist prisoners, including members of AQIM, staged a deadly escape from Nouakchott Civil Prison, killing two guards and prompting a week-long national manhunt and mobile internet shutdown.

== See also ==
- Boko Haram (or ISWAP) insurgency
- Insurgency in Cabo Delgado
- Islamist insurgency in the Sahel
- Sinai insurgency
