= 2011 Nouakchott bombing plot =

Plan to bomb the French Embassy in Mauritania

Coordinates: 18°05′07″N 15°58′21″W

- Part of the Insurgency in the Maghreb (2002–present)
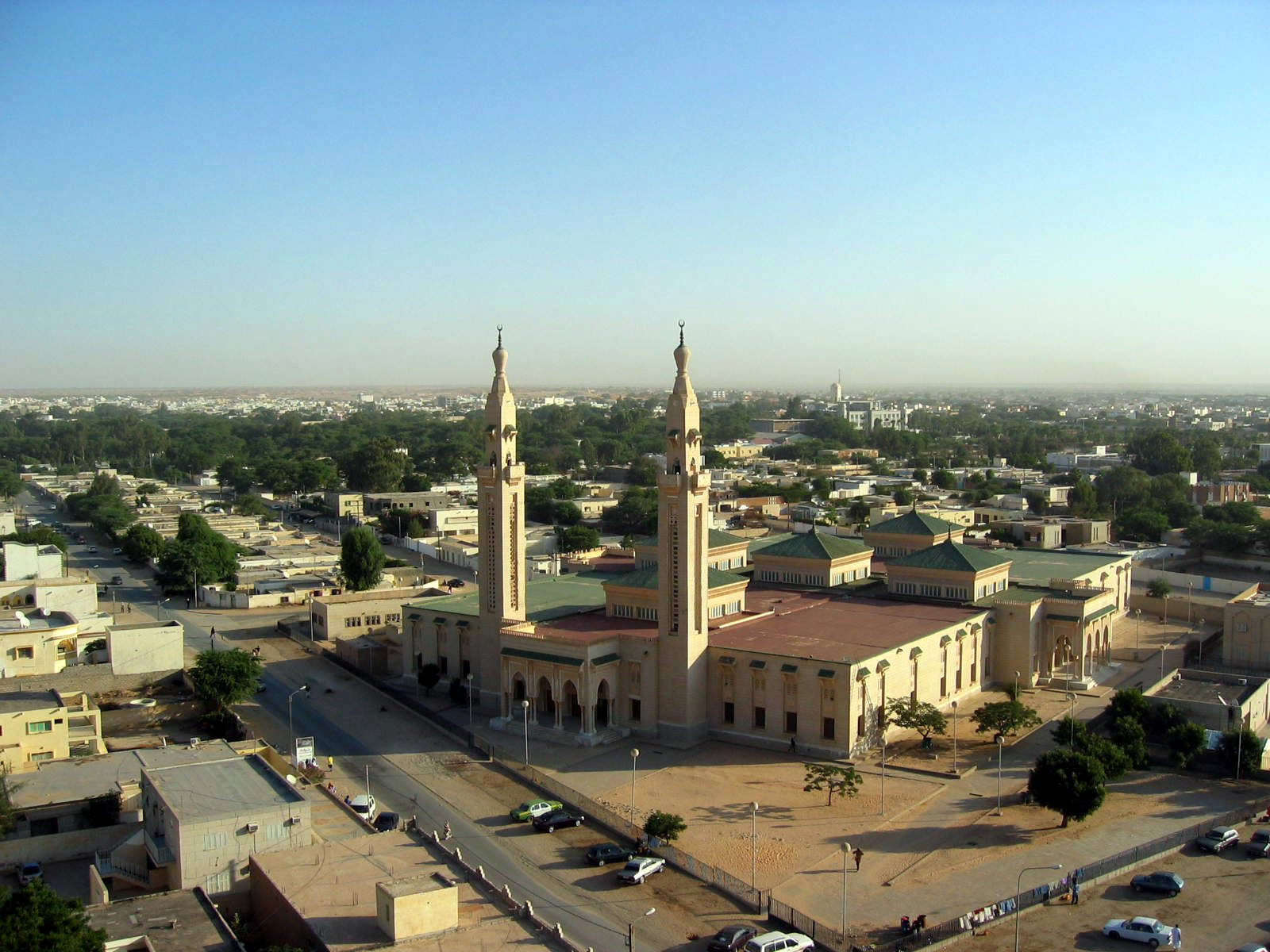
- Nouakchott
- Location: Nouakchott, Mauritania
- Date: February 1–2, 2011
- Target: President Mohamed Ould Abdel Aziz and the Embassy of France
- Attack type: Suicide bombing
- Weapon: truck bomb
- Deaths: 1 gendarme, 3 perpetrators
- Injuries: 9
- Perpetrator: al-Qaeda in the Islamic Maghreb (AQIM)

In early February 2011, operatives from al-Qaeda in the Islamic Maghreb (AQIM) attempted a coordinated attack in the capital city of Nouakchott. The plot involved three vehicle-borne improvised explosive devices (VBIEDs) and aimed to assassinate President Mohamed Ould Abdel Aziz as well as bomb the French Embassy.

== Background ==
In the years leading up to the plot, Mauritania faced a rise in terrorist activity, including killings and kidnappings. In response, the government conducted raids against AQIM bases in Mali. The planned attack would have been the third suicide bombing in the country's history, following the 2009 Nouakchott suicide bombing targeting the French Embassy and the 2010 Néma suicide bombing on a military barracks.

== Planning ==
According to the testimony of Saleck Ould Cheikh Mohamedou, the attack was planned over four months. The group prepared two explosive-laden vehicles and kept backup cars in reserve. The first vehicle, carrying about 1.5 tons of explosives, was intended to target the Ministry of Defense and nearby police headquarters, while the second was aimed at the French Embassy. The cell consisted of eight members, including six Mauritanians, one Algerian, and one from Guinea-Bissau. They traveled from the Tigharghar Mountain through Sélibabi toward the capital, using three vehicles in total. Mohamedou denied that the plot aimed to assassinate Mohamed Ould Abdel Aziz, contradicting claims made by Al-Qaeda in the Islamic Maghreb.

== Interceptions ==
On 28 January, three explosive-laden Toyota Land Cruisers entered Mauritania from northern Mali, and security forces began tracking them immediately. On 1 February, the first vehicle was intercepted near R' Kiz about 200 km south of Nouakchott. It contained around 1.2 tons of explosives and related materials. One suspect was captured, while two others escaped.

In the early hours of 2 February, a second vehicle was stopped in the Riyad district, about 12 kilometers from the city center. When troops engaged it, the explosives detonated, killing three attackers and injuring nine soldiers. The third vehicle was later reported to have fled the scene, and authorities launched a pursuit operation to track it down.

On 5 February, the military captured one of the two suspects who had escaped from the first vehicle after a three-day search operation in a forest near the Senegal River in southern Mauritania. The second suspect reportedly detonated himself during the operation. The fugitives had killed a gendarme before fleeing into the forest.
