= Beni Douala Operations (2008) =

Algerian army ambush of jihadists in Aït-Khalfoune, in Beni Douala

- Part of Jihadist Insurgency in Algeria
Date	8 August 2008
Location	Beni Douala, Algeria 36.6167°N 4.0667°E
Result	Algerian victory

Belligerents
Algeria	(Islamic State) AQIM

Strength
Unknown	Unknown

Casualties and losses
None	12

The Beni Douala Operations took place in Beni Douala on 8 August 2008.

== Operation ==
On the night of August 7–8, 2008, jihadists fell into an ambush set by the Algerian army in the village of Aït-Khalfoune, in Beni Douala, in the region of Tizi Ouzou. Surprised, the jihadists fled, pounded by helicopters launched in pursuit. The operation was decided after an attack on the General Intelligence Directorate in Tizi Ouzou that left 25 injured. 12 Salafist rebels were killed in the confrontation, and seven Kalashnikovs, two Semenov rifles, a pump-action shotgun, a rifle, a Beretta automatic pistol, a grenade, a radio set, and three cellphones were seized by the Algerian forces.
