= Abu Ubaidah Youssef al-Annabi =

Algerian al-Qaeda member (born 7 February 1969)

- أبو عبيدة يوسف العنابي

2nd Emir of AQIM
- Incumbent
- Assumed office 3 June 2020
- Preceded by: Abdelmalek Droukdel

Personal details
- Born: Yezid Mebarek; 7 February 1969 (age 57) Annaba, Algeria
- Education: University of Constantine

Military service
- Allegiance: Al-Qaeda
- Branch/service: FIS (1992–1996); GIA (1996–1998); GSPC (1998–2007); AQIM (2007–present)
- Years of service: 1992–present
- Rank: Emir of AQIM
- Battles/wars: Algerian Civil War; Insurgency in the Maghreb; Operation Juniper Shield

Yazid Mubarak (Arabic: مبارك يزيد; born 7 February 1969), better known by his nom-de-guerre Abu Ubaidah Youssef al-Annabi (Arabic: أبو عبيدة يوسف العنابي), is an Algerian Islamist militant who is the current leader of the Algerian Islamic militant group Al-Qaeda in the Islamic Maghreb (AQIM), formerly the Salafist Group for Preaching and Combat (GSPC). In November 2020, he was named emir, replacing Abdelmalek Droukdel who was killed during a French special operation during the Battle of Talahandak.

The U.S. Rewards for Justice Program is offering up to $7 million in exchange for information leading to al-Annabi's apprehension.

== Biography ==
Youssef al-Annabi was born in Annaba, Algeria. After studying economics at the University of Constantine, he became an active militant of the Islamic Salvation Front (FIS), an Islamist political party created in 1989. A year after the end of the electoral process in January 1992, Youssef al-Annabi, freshly graduated, joined the ranks of the Islamic Salvation Army (AIS) to fight in the Algerian Civil War, then those of the GIA where he met Abdelmalek Droukdel in 1996.

He rose in rank by participating in the creation of the GSPC in 1998. In November 2009, Youssef narrowly escaped death when he fell into an ambush by the Algerian army in the maquis of Imsouhel, in the wilaya of Tizi Ouzou.

After the death of Abdelmalek Droukdel, AQIM announced on 21 November 2020 that Abu Ubaidah Youssef al-Annabi had been appointed to succeed him.

On 29 September 2015, the U.S. State Department designated al-Annabi as a Specially Designated Global Terrorist under Executive Order (E.O.) 13224.

On 28 March 2023, the government of Burkina Faso suspended the broadcasting of French state-owned media France 24 after they aired an interview with al-Annabi. The country's information minister at the time, Jean Emmanuel Ouédraogo, described the channel as, "not only acting as a mouthpiece for these terrorists but worse".

== See also ==
- List of fugitives from justice who disappeared
