= Islamic State – Algeria Province =

Algerian militant group active since 2014

- ولاية الجزائر; Wilāyat al-Jazāʾir
- Logo of the Islamic State's Algeria Province
- Leaders: Abdelmalek Gouri (September 2014 – December 2014) †; Abdullah Othman al-Asimi (December 2014 – May 2015) †
- Spokesperson: Abu Ali al-Muhajir
- Dates active: 14 September 2014 – ?
- Active regions: Algeria
- Ideology: Islamic Statism
- Size: Fewer than 30 (Dec. 2014)
- Part of: Islamic State
- Wars: War on terror; Insurgency in the Maghreb (2002–present)

The Islamic State – Algeria Province (IS–AP; Arabic: الدولة الإسلامية – ولاية الجزائر, romanized: ad-Dawlah al-Islāmiyah – Wilāyat al-Jazāʾir) is a defunct branch of the militant Islamist group Islamic State (IS), active in Algeria. The group was formerly known as Jund al-Khilafah fi Ard al-Jazair (Arabic: جند الخلافة في أرض الجزائر, lit. 'Soldiers of the Caliphate in the land of Algeria or Caliphate Soldiers of Algeria'.) Originally a faction of al-Qaeda in the Islamic Maghreb (AQIM), the group split from AQIM and pledged alliance to IS in September 2014. The group received notoriety later in the same month for the kidnapping and beheading of French citizen Hervé Gourdel. After a subsequent campaign by Algerian authorities killed many of its members and leaders, the group significantly declined in activity and effectively dissolved after May 2015.

== History ==
=== Under Al-Qaeda in the Islamic Maghreb ===
IS–AP was previously a faction of al-Qaeda in the Islamic Maghreb, the Al Qaeda affiliate in North and West Africa. AQIM grew out of Algerian Islamist groups that had fought in the 1990s Civil War. Abdelmalek Gouri (who would later lead Jund al-Khilafah) was formerly the "right-hand man" of Abdelmalek Droukdel, who was the leader of AQIM. Gouri was also part of an AQIM cell responsible for suicide attacks on the government's headquarters and the UN compound in Algiers in 2007. He was also behind an attack in Iboudrarene in April 2014 that left 11 Algerian soldiers dead.

=== Under the Islamic State ===
On 14 September 2014, the leader of al-Qaeda in the Islamic Maghreb (AQIM) in the central region, Khaled Abu Suleiman (nom de guerre of Abdelmalek Gouri), announced in a communique he was breaking allegiance with Al-Qaeda and took an oath of allegiance to the leader of the Islamic State, Abu Bakr al-Baghdadi. He was reportedly joined by an AQIM commander of an eastern region of Algeria. He claimed that other members of AQIM had "deviated from the right path" and declared to al-Baghdadi "You have in the Islamic Maghreb men who will obey your orders."

After kidnapping 55-year-old French mountaineering guide Hervé Gourdel, Jund al-Khilafah stated in a video released on 22 September 2014 that the kidnapping was a fulfilling of an order of IS spokesman Abu Mohammad al-Adnani to attack citizens of countries fighting with the U.S. against IS. On 24 September 2014, Jund al-Khilafah claimed to have beheaded Hervé Gourdel.

On 13 November 2014, Abu Bakr al-Baghdadi announced that the group had changed its name to "Wilayah al-Jazair" in accordance to the structure of the rest of groups aligned with IS. In December 2014, Algerian special forces killed Abdelmalek Gouri, dealing a significant blow to the group while it was still in its infancy. In May 2015, over 20 members of IS–AP, including several commanders and group leader Abdullah Othman al-Asimi, were killed in a military raid. The group was devastated by the raids, and turned its focus to propaganda while attempting to rebuild. Although it advertised the pledges of allegiance of several AQIM splinter factions during 2015, none of the groups involved are believed to be large, and the group did not claim responsibility for any major attacks in the years following the kidnapping and killing of Gourdel.

== Timeline ==
- April 2014: Jund al-Khilafah ambushes Algerian army convoy in Iboudrarene, killing 11 Algerian soldiers and wounding 5.
- 14 September 2014: Jund al-Khilafah leader Khaled Abu-Suleiman announces the group's split from al-Qaeda in the Islamic Maghreb, and pledges allegiance to Abu Bakr al-Baghdadi, leader of the Islamic State of Iraq and the Levant.
- 21 September 2014: Hervé Gourdel is abducted by Jund al-Khilafah in the Djurdjura National Park in Algeria.
- 22 September 2014: Jund al-Khilafah releases a video showing Hervé Gourdel being held captive. The group stated that the kidnapping was in response to France conducting Airstrikes against "Islamic State" and threatened to behead him if France continued to carry out airstrikes against IS.
- 24 September 2014: Jund al-Khilafah releases a video purporting to show the beheading of Hervé Gourdel. The militants shown stated that the beheading was in response to the order of IS spokesman Abu Mohammed al-Adnani, in which he called on followers to attack citizens of member nations of the anti-IS coalition.
- October 2014: One of the Jund al-Khilafah militants responsible for the beheading of Hervé Gourdel was killed in an Algerian military operation in October.
- 11 December 2014: The Algerian justice ministry states that Algerian soldiers had killed two Jund al-Khilafah (now IS–AP) members believed to have been involved in the murder of Hervé Gourdel.
- 20 December 2014: Algerian soldiers kill three IS–AP members in the mountains near Sidi Daoud.
- 22 December 2014: IS–AP leader Abdelmalek Gouri and two other militants were killed by the Algerian army in a military operation in Issers. Afterwards, troops recovered two automatic rifles, explosive belts, and a large amount of ammunition and mobile phones.
- 28 April 2015: The Algerian military killed five IS–AP militants in an ambush in the region of Tizi Ouzou, east of Algiers.
- 20 May 2015: Algerian security forces ambushed an IS–AP meeting east of Algiers, killing at least 21 fighters and capturing two others. Among those killed included IS–AP leader Abdullah Othman al-Asimi.
- 20 February 2016: IS–AP claimed to have killed three Algerian soldiers in Mount Shakshut in Bouira in late February. This claim was denied by the Algerian government.
- 18 February 2021: Abdelmalek Hamzaoui, a suspect in the beheading of Hervé Goudel appeared in court with others being tried in absentia. Hamzaoui was sentenced to death for the murder of Hervé Gourdel.

== Designation as a terrorist organization ==
IS–AP was classified as a terror group by the UK, as well as by the US under the name Jund al-Khilafah (JAK-A). Kazakhstan and Kyrgyzstan have also designated IS–AP as a terrorist group.
