= Battle of Areich Hind =

2010 battle in Mali between Mauritania and AQIM

- Part of the Insurgency in the Maghreb (2002–present)
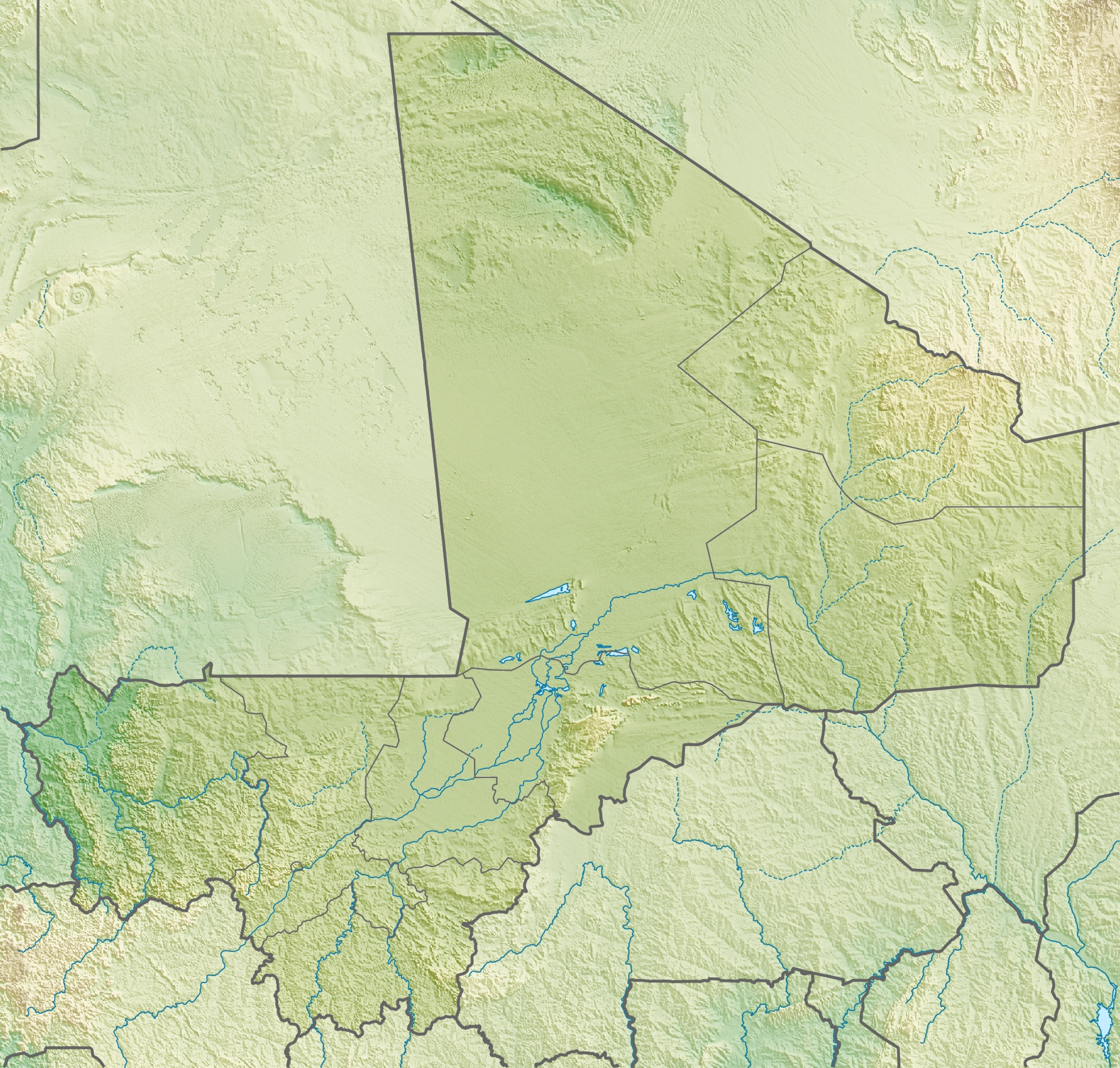
- Battle location (Mali)
Date	September 17–19, 2010
Location	Areich Hind, Raz El Ma, and Hassi Sidi, Tombouctou Region, Mali 16°36′20″N 4°27′35″W
Result	Inconclusive: Both sides claim victory

Belligerents
Mauritania	AQIM

Commanders and leaders
Mohamed Ould Abdel Aziz; Mohamed Ould Mohamed Znagui	Djamel Okacha

Casualties and losses
8 killed (per Mauritania); 15 killed (per Algeria); 19 killed, dozens injured (per AQIM)	12 killed, 6 prisoners (per Mauritania); 1 killed (per AQIM)
- 2 killed, 3–4 injured

The Battle of Areich Hind, also known as the Battle of Raz el-Ma or the Battle of Hassi Sidi, took place between September 17 and 19, 2010, during the Islamist insurgency in the Sahel. Mauritanian forces launched an offensive against a group of AQIM jihadists in Malian territory on September 17.

== Background ==
In the months prior to the battle of Areich Hind, jihadists from Al-Qaeda in the Islamic Maghreb had been expanding into Mali's desolate Tombouctou Region. Mauritanian and Malian forces had launched a raid into the region in July 2010, near the town of Akla, to eliminate an AQIM camp. The raid destroyed the camp, but AQIM militants executed the French hostage Michel Germaneau shortly afterward.

== Battle ==
On September 17, Mauritanian forces, led by Deputy Chief of National Army Staff Mohamed Ould Mohamed Znagui, ambushed a convoy of around twenty AQIM vehicles headed towards the Malian border. The AQIM vehicles belonged to Djamel Okacha's katiba, and consisted of around 150 men. A confrontation broke out between the two forces in Raz El Ma and Areich Hind, near Hassisidi. The fighting continued until the morning of September 18. AQIM claimed in a press release that a small number of French forces fought alongside the Mauritanians, but French authorities denied the allegations.

On September 18, the Mauritanian Army stated six soldiers and twelve jihadists were killed. In the days that followed, two Mauritanian soldiers died of their wounds. A Mauritanian security source also stated that six suspected AQIM members were taken prisoner.

Mauritanian planes bombed AQIM vehicles in the area of Areich Hind on September 19. However, a woman and a girl were killed, and three to four other civilians were injured. AQIM claimed the victims of the bombings were civilians, while the Mauritanian army stated that several jihadists were killed in the raid. The Mauritanian government acknowledged the death of the woman, but claimed she was a jihadist.

AQIM also claimed the deaths of nineteen Mauritanian soldiers, and that AQIM inflicted a "crushing defeat" on the soldiers. They also claimed dozens of soldiers were injured, several vehicles destroyed and captured, and only one jihadist killed. An Algerian security source stated fifteen Mauritanian soldiers were killed in the battle.
