= Tourine ambush =

2008 attack on Mauritanian soldiers by Al-Qaeda in the Islamic Maghreb

- Part of the Insurgency in the Maghreb (2002–present)
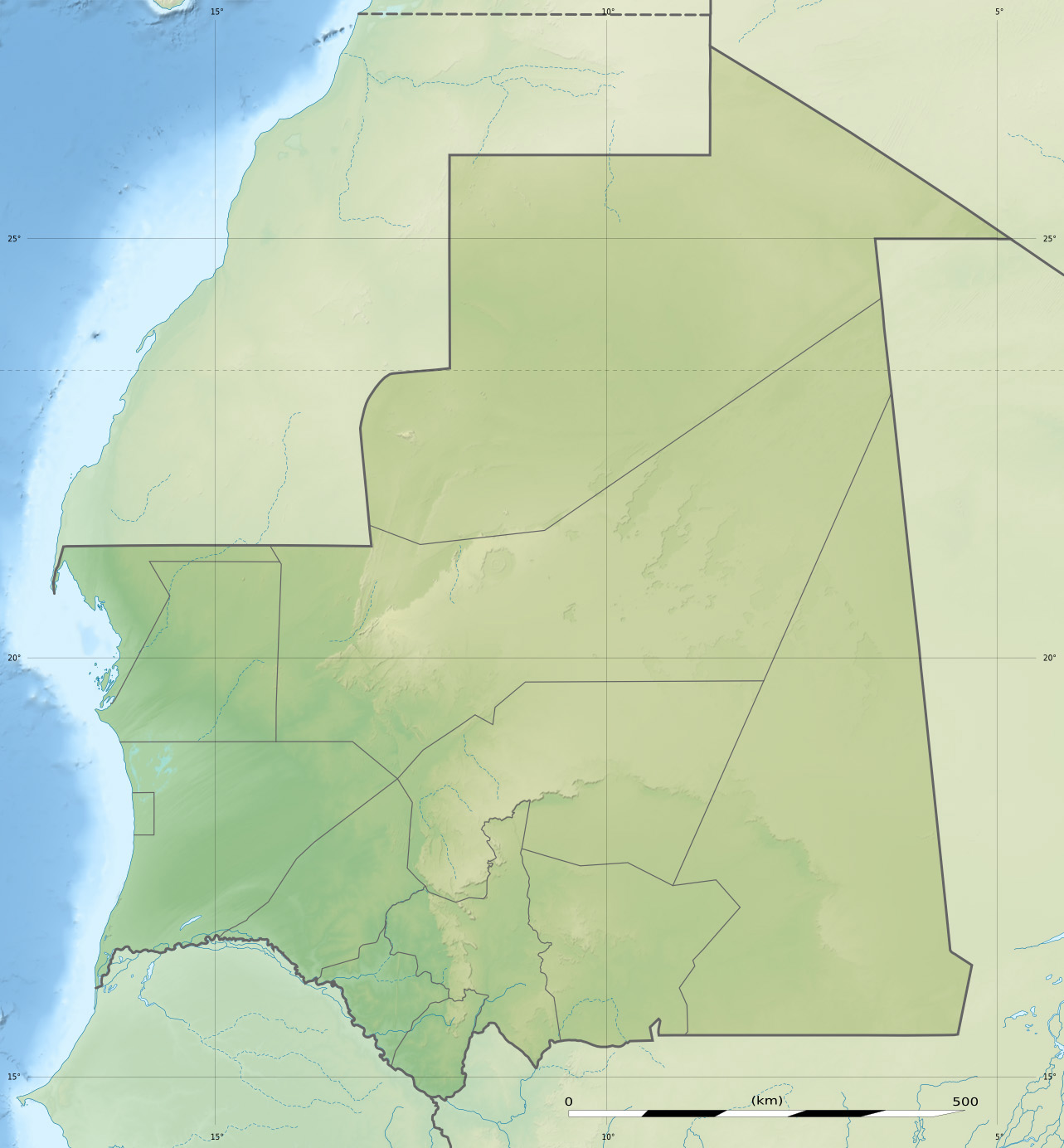
- Ambush location (Mauritania)
Date	September 14–15, 2008
Location	Tourine, near Zouérat, Tiris Zemmour, Mauritania 22°25′24″N 11°50′33″W
Result	AQIM victory

Belligerents
Mauritania	AQIM

Commanders and leaders
	AQIM: Abdelhamid Abou Zeid; Djamel Okacha

Strength
Unknown	~50 men

Casualties and losses
12 captured and executed	Unknown

The Tourine ambush, also known as the Tourine massacre, was an attack on September 14, 2008, in which jihadists from Al-Qaeda in the Islamic Maghreb (AQIM) ambushed Mauritanian soldiers in the village of Tourine, near Zouérat, Mauritania. The ambush was the first major attack by AQIM during the Insurgency in the Sahel, and sparked major changes in the Mauritanian military.

== Background ==
Since 2005, remnants of the jihadist Salafist Group for Preaching and Combat (GSPC) militia that committed various massacres during the Algerian Civil War began conducting an insurgency in rural Mauritania and Mali. Between 2005 and 2008, the group recruited from Mauritanian madrasas, and renamed itself to Al-Qaeda in the Islamic Maghreb (AQIM) and established ties with the global Al-Qaeda network in 2007.

AQIM was able to gain so much influence in Mauritania due to the country's relatively weak military and impoverished, rural society.

== Ambush ==
On the night between September 14 and 15, 2008, a patrol of six Mauritanian army vehicles drove south from Zouérat. Eighty kilometers from the city, near the village of Tourine, AQIM fighters ambushed the convoy. The initial report stated that four vehicles were destroyed, damaged, or captured, and eleven soldiers and a guide were missing. Survivors of the ambush returned to the base in Zouerat. A text from AQIM emir Abdelmalek Droukdel the following day confirmed that AQIM carried out the ambush. Droukdel claimed to have captured twelve soldiers and three vehicles.

On September 20, the Mauritanian government announced the discovery of twelve bodies all found decapitated. Mokhtar Belmokhtar, a senior AQIM member, denied that the Mauritanian soldiers were beheaded by AQIM, although it is unlikely he was present during the ambush. The ambush and beheadings were likely carried out by three other katibas, commanded by Abdelhamid Abou Zeid and Djamel Okacha.

== Aftermath ==
In 2008, in response, to the attack, parts of northern Mauritania were considered a "military zone" to prevent further AQIM attacks.

Special Intervention Groups were also created to patrol the desert, and new cities were created to help monitor nomadic societies in which jihadists could be embedded. On March 20, 2011, four AQIM jihadists were sentenced to death in Nouakchott for their involvement in the ambush and beheadings. Another jihadist was sentenced to two years in prison, and one was acquitted.

On March 5, 2023, one of the AQIM militants convicted for involvement in the Tourine ambush escaped from prison during the 2023 Nouakchott prison break. He was among several Salafist detainees who fled custody. Approximately one week later, Mauritanian security forces located and killed him during an operation to recapture the escapees.
