= 2010 Néma suicide bombing =

Suicide bombing in Néma, Mauritania on August 25, 2010

Coordinates: 16°37′N 7°15′W

- Part of the Insurgency in the Maghreb (2002–present)
- Location: Néma, Hodh Ech Chargui, Mauritania
- Date: August 25, 2010; 16 years ago
- Attack type: Suicide bombing
- Weapon: Car bomb
- Deaths: 1 (the perpetrator)
- Injuries: 3
- Perpetrator: al-Qaeda in the Islamic Maghreb (AQIM)
- Motive: Islamic extremism

On 25 August 2010, al-Qaeda in the Islamic Maghreb (AQIM) carried out a suicide car bombing against a Mauritanian military barracks in Néma, a town approximately 1,200 kilometers east of the capital, Nouakchott.

== Background ==
In previous years, AQIM expanded into the Sahel and targeted Mauritania through kidnappings and attacks. In response, Mauritania carried out a cross-border raid into Mali against AQIM camps, with support from French intelligence and coordination. AQIM had vowed to avenge the deaths of seven of its members in the operation. On 8 August 2009 in Nouakchott, a suicide bomber attacked near the French embassy. The attacker died in the explosion, and three other people were injured.

== Attack ==
In the early hours of 25 August, a suicide bomber drove an explosives-laden vehicle into the headquarters of the Fifth Military Command in Néma and refused to stop despite warnings. Security forces opened fire, after which the vehicle exploded, killing the perpetrator, injuring three soldiers, and causing significant damage at the entrance to the barracks.

== Aftermath ==
After the attack, AQIM claimed responsibility and stated that it was retaliation for the deaths of its members during a Mauritanian raid in Akla. The group also threatened the Mauritanian president over continued cooperation with France. Mauritanian media later identified the bomber as a man named Idriss Ould Youba, who had previously been arrested in 2008 and released in 2009 as part of a prisoner exchange for Western hostages.
