= 2008 Nouakchott clashes =

Armed clashes in Nouakchott, Mauritania

Coordinates: 18°05′07″N 15°58′21″W

- Part of the Insurgency in the Maghreb (2002–present)
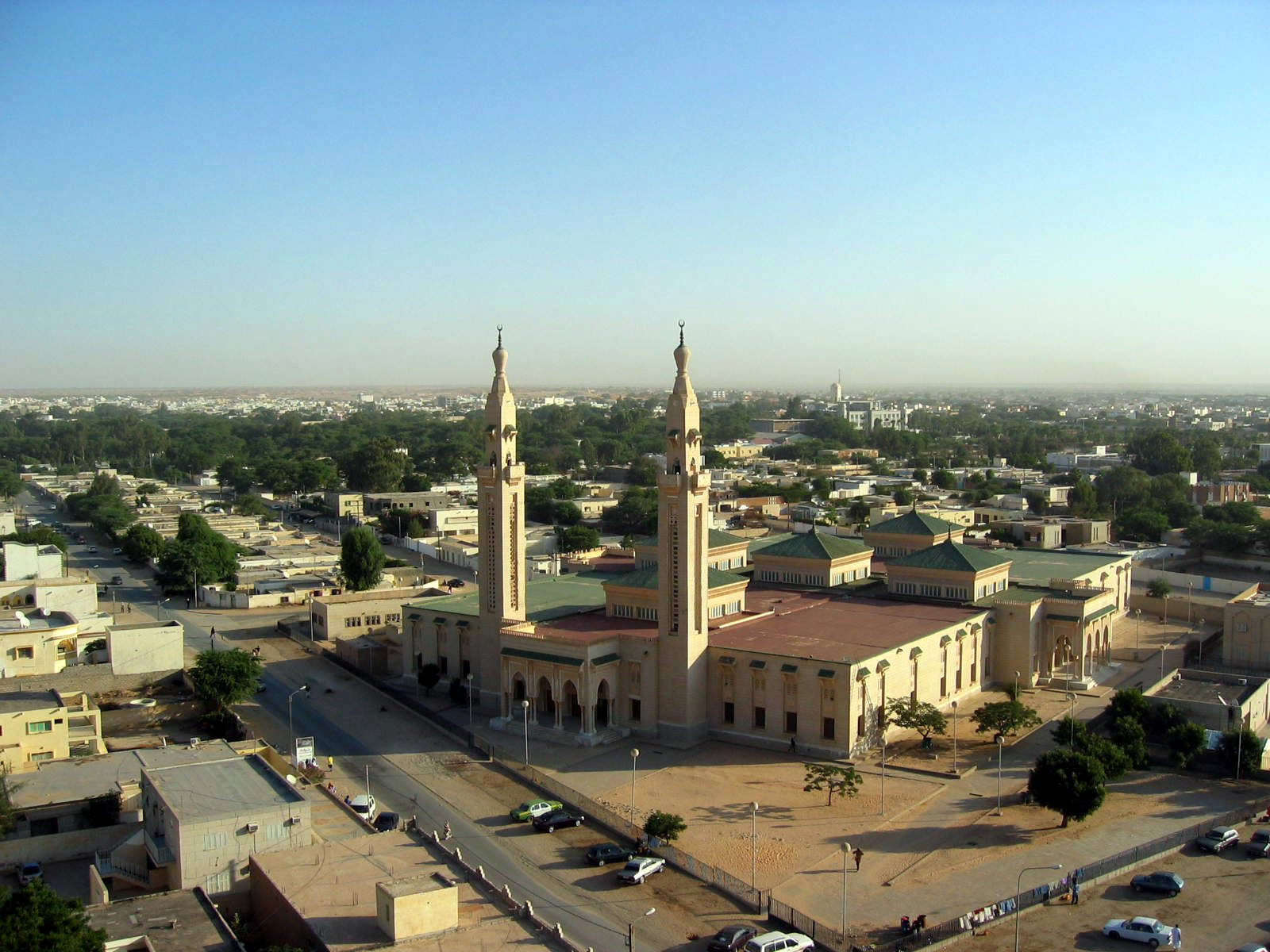
- Nouakchott
Date	April 2008
Location	Nouakchott, Mauritania
Result	Mauritanian victory

Belligerents
Mauritania	AQIM-linked suspects

Casualties and losses
1 killed, 7 injured	2 killed, 1 injured
- 1 killed, 1 injured

In April 2008, an armed confrontation in Nouakchott followed the escape of a key suspect linked to earlier AQIM-related attacks, triggering a large security operation.

== Background ==
In recent years, Al-Qaeda in the Islamic Maghreb has targeted Mauritania through killings and kidnapping. On 24 December 2007, four French tourists were murdered near Aleg, approximately 250 km east of the capital. On 1 February 2008, six gunmen carried out an attack on the Israeli Embassy in Nouakchott and a nearby nightclub. AQIM claimed responsibility for the incident, and all of the perpetrators were subsequently arrested by Mauritanian security forces.

== Escape ==
On 2 April 2008, Sidi Ould Sidna, a key suspect in the murder of four French tourists who had been arrested in January, escaped from the main courthouse in Nouakchott while awaiting a hearing before an investigating magistrate. During questioning, Sidna requested a bathroom break. The police officer guarding the door reportedly left his post to speak with a group of acquaintances. Realizing the guard was absent, Sidna exited the bathroom and fled the building. Once outside, he blended into a large crowd gathered along the main boulevard to await the arrival of Hamad bin Khalifa Al Thani, who was visiting the capital that day.

== Clashes ==
On 7 April, an intensive manhunt led security forces to a villa in the affluent Tevragh Zeina district of Nouakchott. A fierce gun battle ensued between an anti-terrorism unit and four to five militants armed with automatic rifles. One police inspector and two militant were killed, and seven other officers were wounded. During the exchange, a vehicle carrying five to six individuals fled the scene under cover of gunfire from the house. Police later discovered a wounded man inside the abandoned vehicle.

On 8 April, at approximately 7:30 a.m., police and soldiers stormed a second building in northern Nouakchott using tear gas and automatic weapons. Although the suspects had already fled, security forces discovered a fully operational explosives laboratory and ammunition, suggesting preparations for larger attacks. Police initially stated that Sidi Ould Sidna had been killed or captured the previous day, but later retracted the statement, confirming that he remained at large.

On 9 April, in a separate raid based on incorrect intelligence, police surrounded a house and mistakenly shot and killed one civilian while wounding another.

By the end of April, security services re-apprehend Sidi Ould Sidna and approximately 20 other suspects alleged to have been involved in the killings and the attack on the Israeli embassy in February.
