= Abdelmalek Gouri =

Algerian jihadist (1977–2014)

- Nickname: Khaled Abou Slimane
- Born: 1977; Si-Mustapha, Boumerdes Province, Algeria
- Died: December 22, 2014 (aged 36–37) Issers, Boumerdes Province, Algeria
- Allegiance: Jund al-Sham (until 2007); AQIM (2007-2014); Islamic State - Algeria Province
- Branch: Katiba el-Arkam (AQIM)
- Rank: Emir (Katiba el-Arkam); Emir (IS-AP)
- Known for: Founding Islamic State's Algeria Province
- Conflicts: Battle of Nahr el-Bared (2007); Iboudraren ambush

Abdelmalek Gouri (Arabic: عبد المالك قوري), also known as Khaled Abou Slimane (Arabic: خالد أبو سليمان), was an Algerian jihadist who fought in Katiba el-Arkam of Al-Qaeda in the Islamic Maghreb (AQIM) before joining Jund al-Sham in Syria. Gouri then founded Jund al-Khalifa fi Ard al-Jazayer and pledged allegiance to the Islamic State. Gouri was the leader of the Islamic State's Algeria province until his death in December 2014.

== Biography ==
Gouri was born in 1977 in Si-Mustapha, Boumerdès Province, Algeria. During the Algerian Civil War, he was arrested at the age of 20 and sentenced to five years in prison for supporting Islamist rebels. He was granted an amnesty in 1999 as part of the 1999 Algerian Civil Concord referendum. After amnesty, Gouri went to the Beqaa Valley in Lebanon to receive military training. In May 2007, he and twenty other Algerians took part in a battle alongside militants from Fatah al-Islam and Jund al-Sham against the Lebanese Armed Forces in Nahr al-Bared refugee camp.

Gouri and ten other survivors from the battle then fled to Damascus, returning to Algeria using false papers. He then joined Al-Qaeda in the Islamic Maghreb (AQIM), fighting in a katiba that committed the December 11, 2007, Algiers bombings that killed 41 people. Gouri was then appointed as the head of the katiba, dubbed Katiba el-Arkam, and was considered a close lieutenant of Abdelmalek Droukdel. Gouri was sentenced to death in absentia by an Algerian court for an attack on Thénia in 2014. That same year, he was suspected of planning an attack against Algerian forces in Iboudraren that killed sixteen soldiers.

On June 29, 2014, the Islamic State in Iraq and al-Sham proclaimed the re-establishment of its Algeria province, calling on members of AQIM to pledge allegiance to it. AQIM rejected ISIS' calls on July 4. Gouri and about thirty other fighters defected from AQIM later that month, founding Jund al-Khalifa fi Ard al-Jazayer and pledging allegiance to the Islamic State. The Islamic State's Algeria province's (IS-A) first attack was the kidnapping and beheading of French tourist Herve Gourdel on September 23, 2014.

Gouri was killed by Algerian forces in Issers, Algeria on December 22, 2014, alongside two other jihadists.
