= 2023 Nouakchott prison break =

Violent prison break of four AQMI prisoners in Nouakchott, Mauritania

- Part of Islamist insurgency in the Sahel
Date	5 March 2023; 3 years ago 21:00 GMT
Location	Nouakchott Civil Prison, Tevragh Zeina, Nouakchott-Ouest, Mauritania 18°5′10.1″N 15°57′49.07″W
Status	Prison break successful; Security forces regain control of the prison; Search operation ends up with three jailbreakers shot and killed; Mobile internet access restricted in the country

Belligerents
Mauritania: National Guard; Armed Forces; Presidential Guard	Al-Qaeda in the Islamic Maghreb prisoners

Strength
Unknown	4 prisoners

Casualties and losses
3 killed 2 injured	3 killed 1 detained

The 2023 Nouakchott prison break was the result of a prison riot in the Nouakchott Civil Prison, the central prison of Mauritania. Four AQMI members managed to escape from the Nouakchott civil prison, leading to Nouakchott entering a high-alert situation for the next days.

== Prison break ==
At 21:00 local time (GMT) a mutiny occurred at the Nouakchott Civil Prison, located in the Tevragh Zeina district of the city. During the mutiny two guards were killed and two others were injured as the mutiny was later revealed to be a prison break operation organised by Salafist convicts condemned for terrorism and belonging to Al-Qaeda in the Islamic Maghreb (AQMI), who were able to use firearms after seizing one from the guards.

The Gendarmerie Nationale proceeded to clear and restrict access to key buildings in downtown Nouakchott, including the Central Bank, the National Assembly and Radio Mauritanie, while the Armed Forces restricted access to major streets of the capital and the Presidential Palace. President Mohamed Ould Ghazouani was not in the country, as he was touring the Gulf Countries.

At 23:00, news agencies confirmed that at least two Salafist prisoners managed to escape the prison following a confrontation with the guards who supervise the prison, with two being wounded. It was also confirmed that the Army deployed forces in the vicinity of the prison and government buildings, while the Presidential Guard forces surrounded the vicinity of the Presidential Palace. Major military leaders also arrived to the prison shortly after.

The number of fugitives was at first reported to be two, with it later increasing to three and finally four after a statement from the Ministry of Interior, which confirmed that the authorities retook control of the prison and asked for citizens' cooperation in tracking down the fugitives.

== Fugitives ==
- Saleck Ould Cheikh (born 1984 in Atar), a terrorist sentenced to death for planning an assassination attempt against ex-President Mohamed Ould Abdel Aziz through the 2011 Nouakchott bombing plot. He previously escaped prison in 2015 and managed to leave the country, with him being arrested in Guinea-Bissau and returned to prison in Nouakchott in 2016.
- Mohamed Rassoul Ould Chbih, a terrorist sentenced to death due to his participation in a 2008 AQMI terrorist operation known as the Tourine Operation, in which 12 soldiers were killed.
- Mohamed Yeslem Mohamed Mahmoud, in jail since 2020, sentenced to ten years for "attempting to join a group with the aim of committing terrorist crimes".
- Abdellarim Abubakr Siddiq Ebattna in jail since 2021, sentenced to seven years for "attempting to join a group with the aim of committing terrorist crimes" and "receiving training abroad".

== Search ==
The Minister of National Defence, Hanena Ould Sidi, chaired a security meeting with top military leaders, including the chiefs of staff, which elaborated a plan to track down the fugitive terrorists.

A car with one of its wheels broken allegedly used by the fugitive terrorists was found by security forces at around 23:30 in the El Mouqawama crossroad in the Dar Naïm suburb in north-eastern Nouakchott, with it containing a piece of a weapon inside. The Police and National Guard immediately cordoned off the location while waiting for the public prosecutor to arrive for its inspection.

On 6 March 2023, the Gendarmerie opened fire at a car near the bridge connecting the Nouakchott–Oumtounsy International Airport to the Nouakchott-Nouadhibou road at around 8 am. Security forces later raided a house in Dar Naïm at the evening and detained two individuals. Security forces later raided a house in Dar Naïm at the evening and detained two individuals.

On 11 March 2023, Mauritanian authorities confirmed that joint armed forces and anti-terror gendarmerie units tracked the four escaped prisoners to a rugged mountainous area in the Adrar region after intelligence-led searches involving air and ground coordination. During the operation, a firefight broke out when the fugitives opened fire on security forces, resulting in the death of one gendarme and intense clashes in the desert terrain. Three of the escapees were killed during the confrontation, while the fourth was captured alive and taken into custody.Three weeks later, Mauritanian police announced that they had arrested a man believed to be the orchestrator of the escape.

== Aftermath ==
=== Security measures adopted ===
The country's borders were reinforced, especially in the southern border posts of Rosso and Diama. Security checks were increased, with ID controls and checks being done to all crossers, leading to a significantly slower border.

=== Suspension of services ===
The Lycée Français Théodore Monod suspended its classes and cancelled a school trip to Adrar due to orders from the French embassy, with the school expecting to re-open its doors on Tuesday 7 March.

The American International School of Nouakchott was also closed on 6 March 2023 due to orders from the US embassy.

=== Mobile internet disruption ===
A major national internet disruption to mobile data services happened shortly after, starting on 6 March at 10 am and with fixed internet connections not being affected. The disruption was observed by NetBlocks. According to Nasser Weddady, the disruption was voluntarily done by the three mobile operators of the country and it at first only covered the city of Nouakchott, although it later extended to the rest of the country. Weddady suggested that this disruption did three things: it made it harder to communicate on encrypted messaging apps and to transfer money using mobile banking apps (but not impossible as some allow transfers on GSM) and it helped the government control the media narrative.

Mobile internet access was restored six days later.

=== Victims ===
A funeral for the two dead guards was held on the next morning at the Ibn Abass Mosque of Nouakchott, located just next to the prison.

The Ministers of Justice, Defence and Interior visited the other two injured guards, with the ministers also meeting with a number of family members of the two guards that were killed.

== Reactions ==
=== Embassies ===
- France: The French Embassy in Nouakchott urged French citizens residing in Nouakchott to avoid the Dar Naïm neighbourhood.
- United States: The US Embassy in Nouakchott urged American citizens residing in Nouakchott to avoid the Dar Naïm neighbourhood, with it considering the whole city of Nouakchott as a dangerous area. The embassy also announced that its building is open, with the adoption of remote work in most cases.

=== Political parties ===
- The Rally of Democratic Forces condemned the assassination of the guards and considered the prison break as "a terrorist act". The RFD also described the situation as "dangerous" and "its solidarity and support for the armed and security forces in confronting these events".
- The National Rally for Reform and Development condemned what it described as a "terrorist incident" and "treacherous criminal operation", and denounced "what it might lead to affecting the public peace of society". In a statement, a copy of which was received by the Al Akhbar, the party stated that "the sanctity of infallible blood, and the danger of making it easy for it to be permissible, regardless of the motives and justifications", adding that "the correct Islamic approach is based on mediation, moderation, calling people with wisdom and good preaching, and education on the principles of the correct faith as the ancestors were brought up on". The party also called for the perpetrators to be punished and considered the killed guards "martyrs performing their duty in guarding a public facility with all honor and sincerity.
- The Hope Mauritania coalition condemned the escape of the Salafist prisoners, calling for them to be tracked down and held accountable and offered their condolences "to the families of the two martyrs, their relatives, the National Guard, and all the Mauritanian people". The coalition also called on the government to "compensate those affected by the internet outage, especially small business owners".
