= Battle of Talahandak (2020) =

Operation that killed a terrorist leader

- Part of the Mali War
Date	3 June 2020
Location	Talahandak, Kidal Region, Mali 20.595°N 1.290°E
Result	French victory

Belligerents
France; United States (technical assistance)	Al-Qaeda in the Islamic Maghreb

Commanders and leaders
	Abdelmalek Droukdel †

Casualties and losses
None	4 killed 1 captured
- Location within Mali

The Battle of Talahandak took place on 3 June 2020 during the Mali War. It resulted in the death of Abdelmalek Droukdel, the leader of al-Qaeda in the Islamic Maghreb (AQIM).

== Background ==
On 1 June 2020, with aid from the CIA and the DGSE, French special forces closely working with Operation Barkhane identified that Abdelmalek Droukdel, the leader of AQIM, was present in the area around Tessalit, Mali. After the scanning operation, French general staff declared that after two days of electromagnetic signal scanning, they identified that a target of interest was in the region.

== Battle ==
On 3 June, the operation was launched by operators of the French Special Operations Command to eliminate Abdelmalek Droukdel.

The AQIM group was composed of Abdelmalek Droukdel, the leader of AQIM, Toufik Chaib, a senior leader of AQIM in charge of propaganda and coordination with Jama'at Nasr al-Islam wal Muslimin (JNIM). They were accompanied by three AQIM jihadists. They drove a white SUV, in which they stopped near a small heap of stones, and set up a bivouac in the wadi of Ourdjane, between two and five kilometres south of the village of Talahandak.

Talahandak is located 80 kilometres (50 mi) east of the village of Tessalit, and 20 kilometres (12 mi) from the Algerian border. Based on accounts from the Agence France-Presse, the area was described as a crossroads for truckers, who sometimes wait for several weeks for the border with Algeria to be opened, as well as a "hotspot for migrant trafficking", according to a UN expert in Mali.

The operation was launched by 15 French special operators with two Caracal helicopters, one Tiger attack helicopter, a Gazelle helicopter and an MQ-9 Reaper drone. Because of the weather conditions in the area, French special forces had to operate on the ground during daylight.

During the beginning of the clashes, the AQIM command attempted to flee from the encounter. They were forced to attempt a counterattack against the French special forces, leading to a close quarter firefight. Four AQIM jihadists were killed, including Droukdel and Chaib. The driver of the white SUV surrendered, and was taken captive by the French army.

== Aftermath ==
On 5 June 2020, the Minister of the Armed Forces, Florence Parly, announced through her Twitter account the death of Abdelmalek Droukdel, and declared that the "essential fight for peace and stability in the region has just been a major success". The United States Africa Command (AFRICOM) indicated that it had confirmation of the death of Droukdel through their own means. According to France 24's journalist Wassim Nasr, Droukdel's death is also confirmed by sources close to AQIM. AQIM officially acknowledged the death of its leader in a video published almost two weeks later.

The French army declared that they do not know how long Abdelmalek Droukdel had been in Mali, but journalist Wassim Nasr said that according to AQIM sources, Droukdel was on his way to a meeting with Iyad Ag Ghaly, the head of JNIM. Le Monde indicates that according to an official French source, it had not been long since Abdelmalek was in Mali, without knowing if it was because of movement constrained by the events in Algeria or if it was deliberately in line with AQIM's development, they had information for a month that the AQIM staff was heading towards the north of Mali. This led Droukdel to expose himself to intelligence agencies.
