= Raid on Akla =

2010 French and Mauritanian raid on Al-Qaeda in Mali

- Part of the Insurgency in the Maghreb (2002–present)
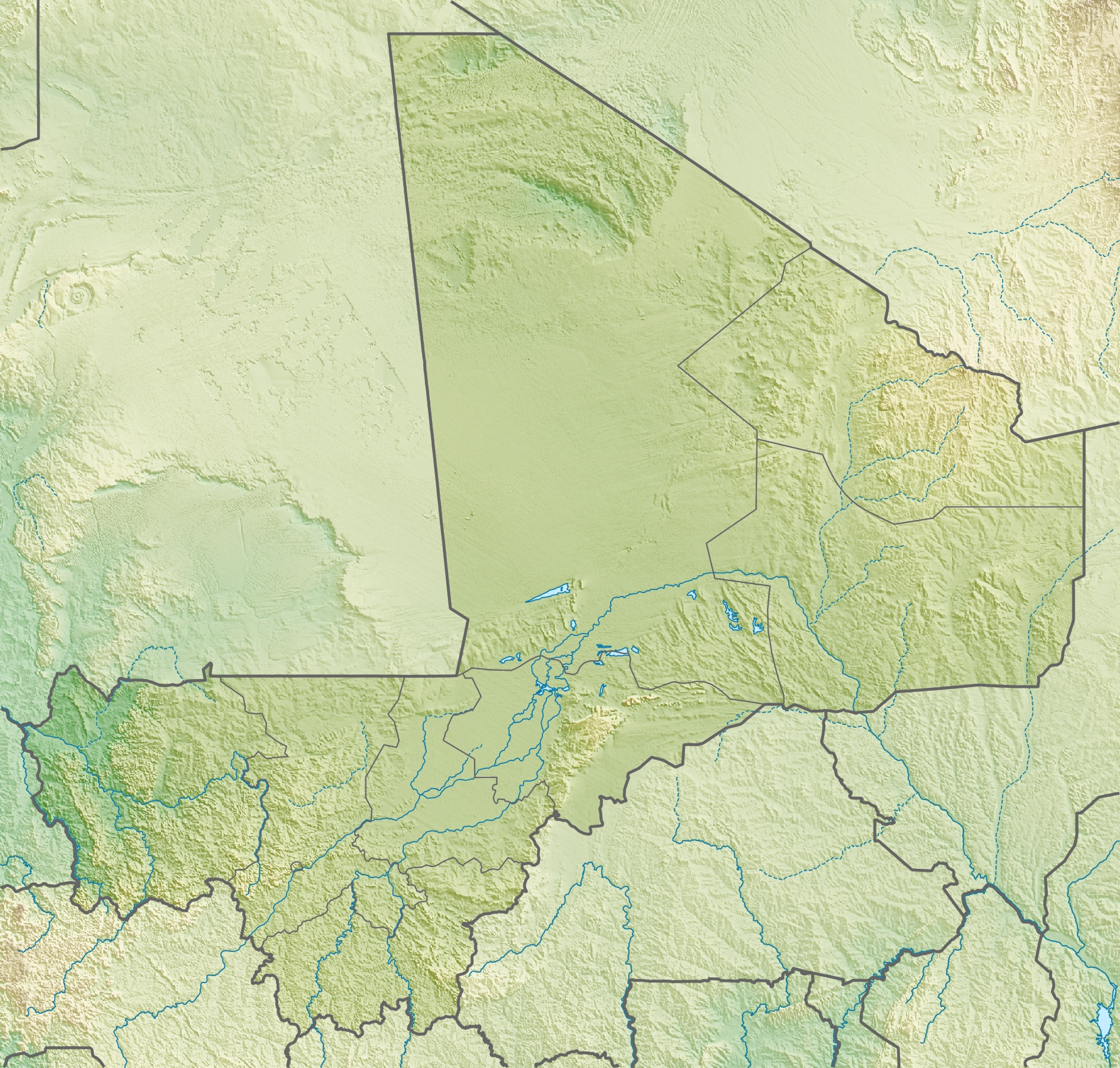
- Raid location (Mali)
Date	July 22, 2010; 16 years ago
Location	near Akla, Tombouctou Region, Mali 21°24′5.760″N 5°34′31.800″W
Result	Franco-Mauritanian tactical victory AQIM strategic victory

Belligerents
Mauritania; France	AQIM

Casualties and losses
None	6 killed 1 injured

On July 22, 2010, French and Mauritanian forces launched a raid on an Al-Qaeda in the Islamic Maghreb (AQIM) base in Tombouctou Region, Mali, in an attempt to rescue French hostage Michel Germaneau. The forces were able to destroy the base, but Germaneau was not rescued and later executed by AQIM.

== Background ==
Between April 19 and April 22, 2010, French national Michel Germaneau and his driver were kidnapped by jihadists from Abdelhamid Abou Zeid's katiba, part of Al-Qaeda in the Islamic Maghreb (AQIM). The driver was released on April 29, but Germaneau was kept by the jihadists for several months. On July 11, AQIM threatened to execute Germaneau within fifteen days if two AQIM officials; one held in an Algerian jail and Rachid Ramda, were not released.

== Raid ==
On July 22, 2010, Mauritanian special intervention groups supported by French Action Division paratroopers raided an AQIM camp in rural Tombouctou Region in Mali, around 150 kilometers from the Mauritanian border. Malian President Amadou Toumani Touré was not informed of the raid beforehand, as he wasn't considered very active in the war against jihadists. Little is known about what occurred during the battle, however it is known that the raid occurred at an AQIM camp near Akla, a village in the desert of Tombouctou. Mauritanian Defense Minister Mohamed Ould Boilil stated that AQIM was preparing an attack on a Mauritanian military barracks in Bassikounou, and that the raid was a preventative measure by the Mauritanians. For the French, the primary objective was to free Germaneau.

Around ten AQIM fighters were defending the camp at the time of the raid, and they were quickly defeated by a contingent of twenty to thirty French soldiers and an even larger number of Mauritanians. Germaneau was not present at the base at the time of the raid. Two residents of Timbuktu were arrested by Mauritanian soldiers as well, but released a few days later. Boilil stated that six jihadists were killed in the raid and one injured, as well as four others fleeing. Explosives, weaponry, and "means of communications" were seized from the camp. Boilil also stated that no Mauritanian soldiers were killed or injured in the battle, thanking French intelligence and assistance. The deaths of six fighters were confirmed by AQIM emir Abdelmalek Droukdel several days later. Droukdel also claimed that the raid occurred during negotiations for Germaneau's release, which French authorities denied.

== Aftermath ==
On July 25, AQIM published an audio recording announcing the execution of Germaneau in response to the raid on Akla. A Malian official stated that Germaneau was executed in front of Droukdel, but French Prime Minister François Fillon called those statements "inexact." French journalist Jean-Dominique Merchet claimed that Germaneau was not executed, and instead died of a lack of heart medication.

A Malian intermediary in negotiations for Germaneau's release, however, stated that a French national was indeed executed in retaliation for the raid. This was clarified from a confession by Tunisian AQIM fighter Bechir Bessnoun during a foiled attack. Bessnoun stated that Germaneau was executed with a bullet to the head in Adrar Tigharghar of the Adrar des Ifoghas of Mali. The executioner was Hamada Ag Hama, on the orders of Abou Zeid and Djamel Okacha.

The raid was seen as a serious failure by the Élysée and the Action Division. Germaneau's body was never found, but his passport was discovered by Chadian soldiers in Adrar Tigharghar during the Battle of Tigharghar.
