= 2009 Nouakchott suicide bombing =

Suicide bombing in Nouakchott, Mauritania on August 8, 2009

Coordinates: 18.1000°N 15.9500°W

- Part of the Insurgency in the Maghreb (2002–present)
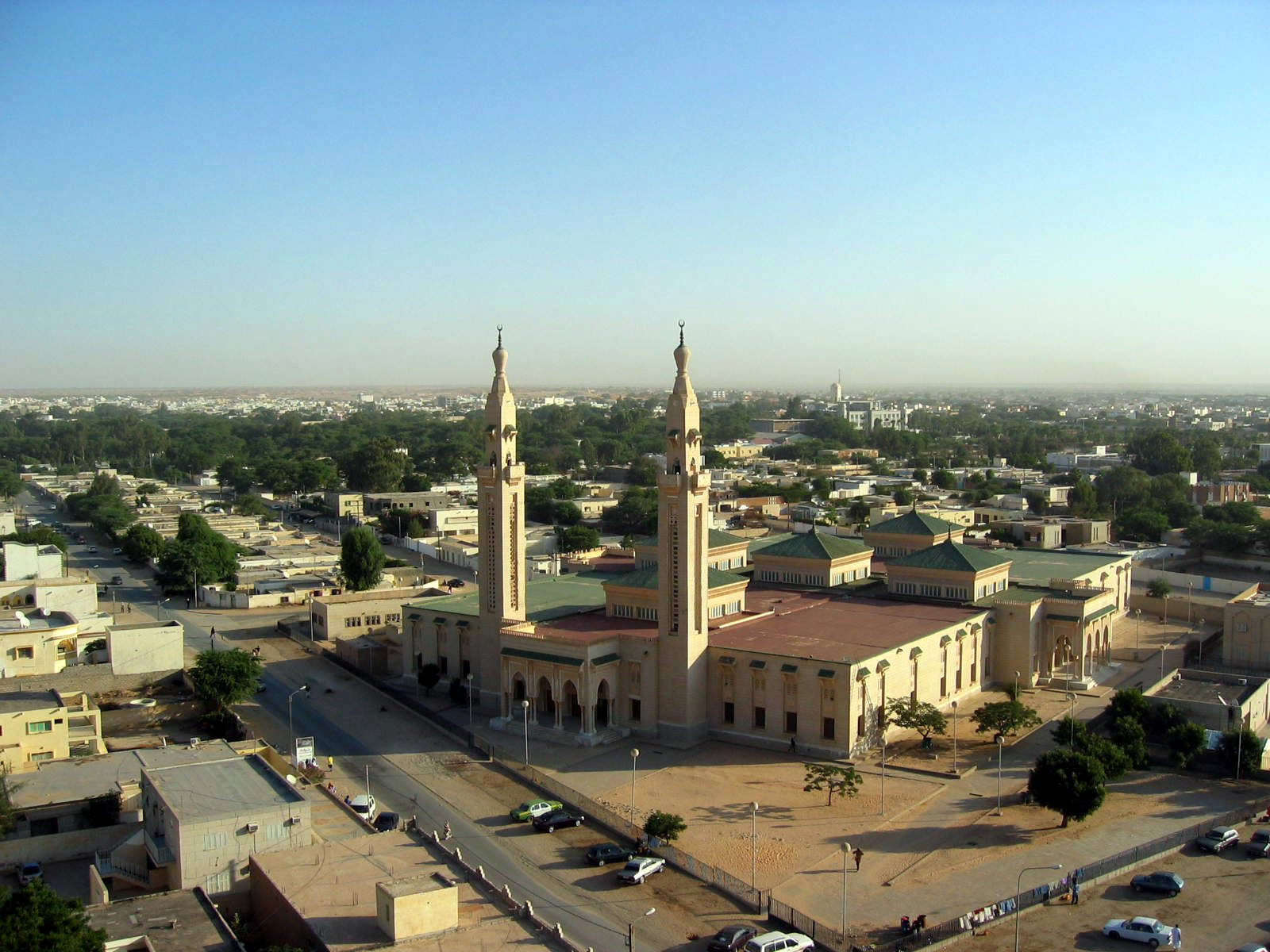
- Nouakchott
- Location: Nouakchott, Mauritania
- Date: August 8, 2009; 17 years ago 19:00 (UTC)
- Target: Embassy of France
- Attack type: Suicide bombing
- Weapon: Explosive belt
- Deaths: 1 (the perpetrator)
- Injuries: 3
- Perpetrator: al-Qaeda in the Islamic Maghreb

The 2009 Nouakchott suicide bombing occurred in Nouakchott, the capital of Mauritania, on August 8, 2009, outside the embassy of France. It was the first instance of a suicide bombing in the history of Mauritania. The bombing killed the perpetrator and wounded three people.

The attack occurred three weeks after Mohamed Ould Abdel Aziz had claimed victory in the contested 2009 Mauritanian presidential election. His inauguration took place on August 5, 2009, just three days before the Nouakchott bombing.

== Background ==
Mauritania has witnessed a series of terrorist attacks against Western interests in recent years. Four French tourists were kidnapped and murdered in 2007. On June 23, 2009, an American teacher, Christopher Logest, was shot and killed in an attack in Nouakchott. The terrorist group, Al-Qaeda Organization in the Islamic Maghreb (AQIM), claimed responsibility for both attacks.

== Attack ==
The attacker, a young man, was reportedly wearing a boubou, a traditional men's garment common in Mauritania and other regions of West Africa. The bomber wore an explosive belt.

The man blew himself up on the sidewalk between the French embassy and the Embassy of Libya at approximately 7:00 pm local time. While both embassies were near the suicide bombing, the target was clearly the French embassy. The explosion did not damage the French embassy.

Two employees of the French embassy, who were identified as paramilitary gendarmes, were jogging nearby at the time of the attack. Both were hospitalized overnight with minor injuries. One other person was slightly injured in the attack.

The detonations marked the first time that a suicide bombing had taken place in Mauritania.

== Investigation ==
The government of France announced an investigation of the terrorist attack. The French government issued a statement promising to support Mauritanian authorities during the inquiry.

The Mauritanian police identified the suicide bomber as a Mauritanian man born in 1987. Authorities stated that the perpetrator had been "formally identified as a member of the Jihadist movement."

== Reaction ==
The French Foreign Ministry condemned, "with the greatest firmness the attack ... in Nouakchott near the French embassy."

The Mauritanian Ministry of Foreign and European Affairs issued a statement expressing that it,

wishes the injured a speedy recovery and expresses wholehearted solidarity to the Mauritanian authorities in the face of this act of terrorism. France reaffirms her determination to fight against terrorism alongside the Mauritanian authorities and people.

== See also ==
- 2007 killing of French tourists in Mauritania
