= 2007 killing of French tourists in Mauritania =

2007 terrorist attack in Mauritania

- Part of the Insurgency in the Maghreb (2002–present)
- Location: Aleg, Brakna, Mauritania
- Date: December 24, 2007; 18 years ago
- Target: French tourists
- Attack type: Shooting
- Weapon: Assault rifle
- Deaths: 4
- Injuries: 1
- Perpetrator: Al-Qaeda in the Islamic Maghreb (AQIM)
- Motive: Islamic extremism, anti-French sentiment, anti-Western sentiment
- Verdict: 3 sentenced to death
- Convicted: 3 convicted

The 2007 killing of French tourists in Mauritania happened on 24 December 2007. The attack happened near Aleg, 250 km east of the capital Nouakchott.

Four of them were killed and the fifth was seriously injured. There was one survivor; the victims were his two adult sons, brother, and a friend.

Mauritanian authorities arrested nine people on 7 January 2008. An assault rifle was recovered by police from a location close to the scene of the killings. The Mauritanian interior minister blamed a terrorist sleeper cell for the killings. Authorities say suspects are members of an extremist group linked to al-Qaida.

One of the suspects arrested in January, Sidi Ould Sidna, escaped police custody in April but was rearrested later that month. Sidna had trained with the group Al-Qaeda in the Maghreb, which confirmed Sidna was affiliated with their organization. In 2010, three men who claimed to be "soldiers of Al-Qaeda", Sidi Ould Sidna, Mohamed Ould Chabarnou, and Maarouf Ould Haiba, were sentenced to death by a Mauritanian court for the attack.
