= Beni Douala =

At Dwala Larba n’Aït Dwala
- Commune and town
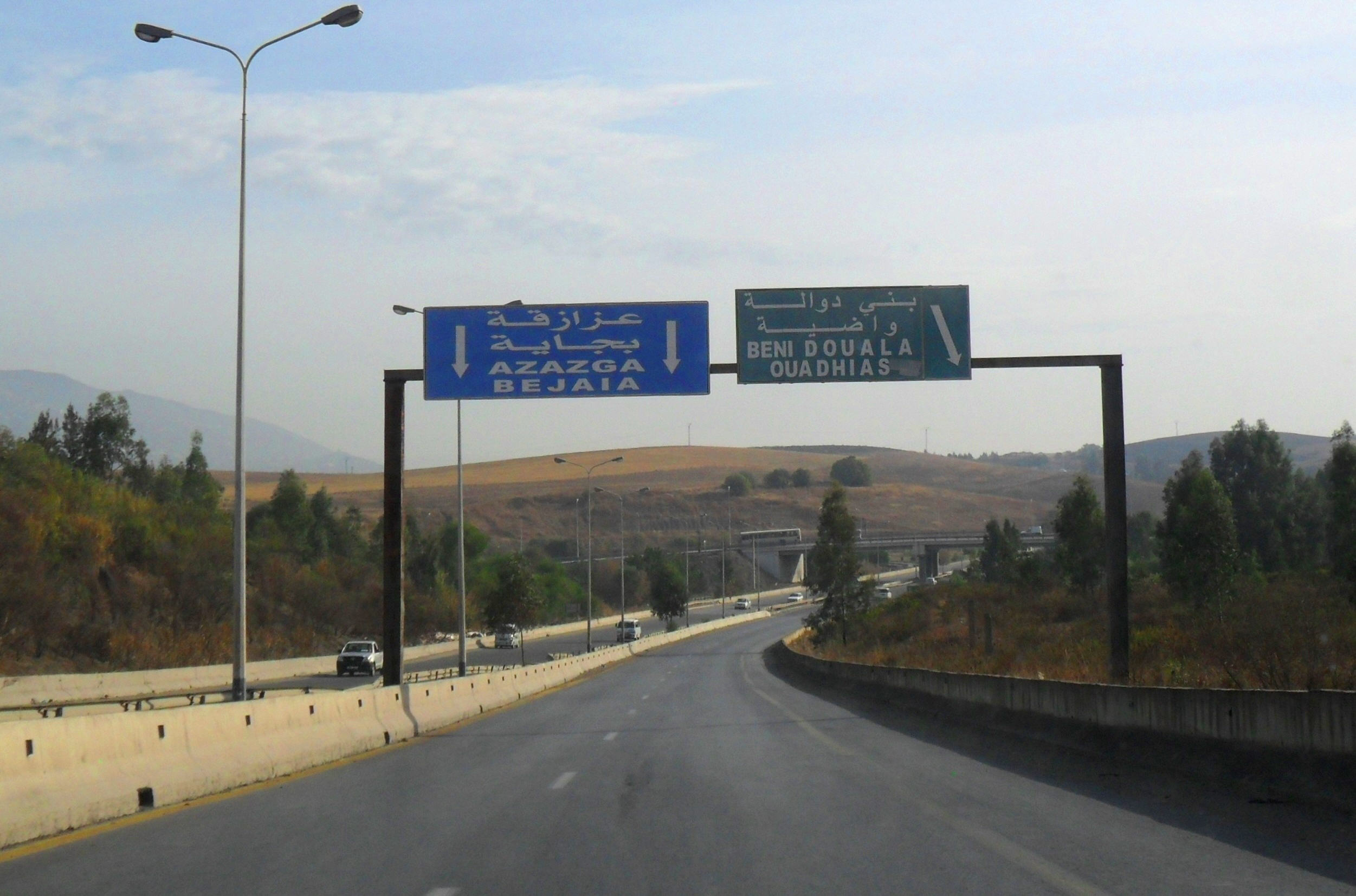

- Location within Algeria
- Country: Algeria
- Province: Tizi Ouzou Province
- District: At Dwala District

Population (2008)
  - Total: 21,555
- Time zone: UTC+1 (CET)

At Dwala is a town and commune in Tizi Ouzou Province in northern Algeria. At Dwala, or Aït Douala (At Dwala in Kabyle), is located 17 km south-east of Tizi-Ouzou.

== Villages in the commune ==
At its creation, in 1984, the commune of At Dwala was composed of the following eighteen localities.:

- Thala Bounane
- Ighil Bezrou
- Thighzert
- Aguemoun
- Thabarkoukth
- Thamaright
- (Ait Ɛli Waɛli) Aït Ali Ouali
- (Ath Bu Yehya) Ait Bouyahia
- Amsiouene (Amsiwen)
- (Ait Bu Ɛli) Aït Bouali
- Aït Hellal
- (Ait Yidir) Aït Idir
- Ait Mesbah
- Aït Douala
- (Ichardiwen Oufella) Icherdiouene Oufella
- Taguemount Oukerrouch
- (Tamaɣuct) Tamaghoucht (Tamaɣuct)
- Ighil Mimoun
- Taboudrist
- Thaddarth Oufella
- Tala Khelil
- Tchardioune Bedda
