= Abdelmalek Droukdel =

Algerian al-Qaeda member (1970–2020)

- عبد المالك دروكدال
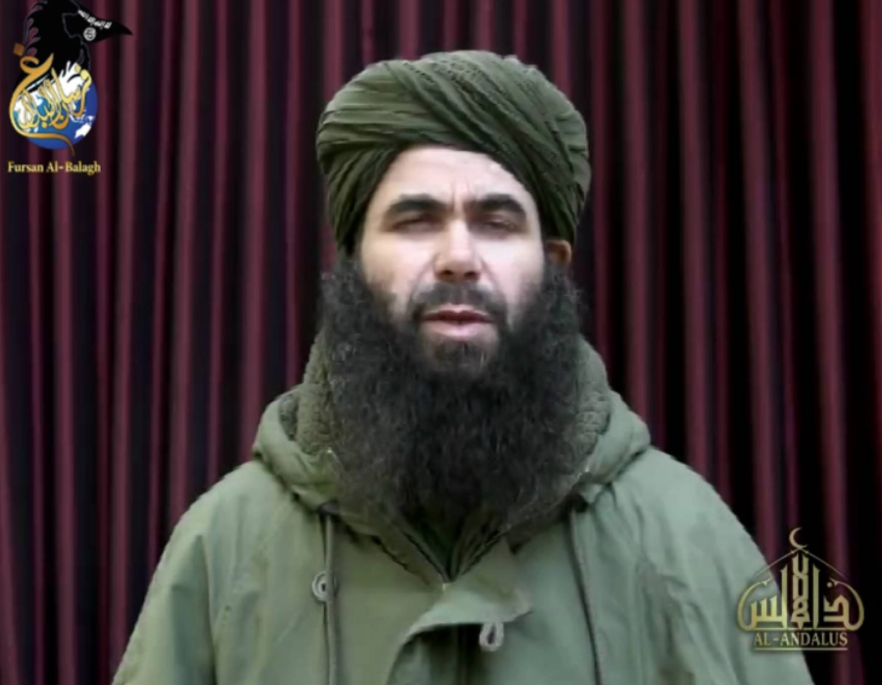
- Droukdel in 2007

1st Emir of AQIM
- In office 26 January 2007 – 3 June 2020
- Preceded by: Position created
- Succeeded by: Abu Ubaidah Youssef al-Annabi

Personal details
- Born: 20 April 1970 Meftah, Algeria
- Died: 3 June 2020 (aged 50) Talahandak, Mali
- Education: Blida 1 University

Military service
- Allegiance: Al-Qaeda
- Branch/service: GIA (1993–1998); GSPC (1998–2007); AQIM (2007–2020)
- Years of service: 1993 – 2020
- Rank: Emir
- Battles/wars: Soviet–Afghan War; Algerian Civil War; Insurgency in the Maghreb; Operation Juniper Shield; Battle of Talahandak †

Abdelmalek Droukdel (Arabic: عبد المالك دروكدال; 20 April 1970 – 3 June 2020), also known by his alias as Abu Musab Abdel Wadoud (Arabic: أبو مصعب عبد الودود), was the emir, or leader, of the Algerian Islamic militant group Al-Qaeda in the Islamic Maghreb (AQIM), formerly the Salafist Group for Preaching and Combat (GSPC). He was killed during a French special operation during the Battle of Talahandak.

== Early life and education ==
Droukdel was born in Meftah, Algeria, on 20 April 1970. He earned a bachelor's degree in mathematics from the University of Blida before joining the insurgency in 1996.

== Afghan War, Algerian Civil War and the GSPC ==
Droukdel returned to Algeria after fighting in the Afghan civil war, and joined the GSPC. Droukdel was a regional leader of the GSPC for several years before becoming the group's commander in 2004 following the death of then-leader Nabil Sahraoui. His mentor was Abu Musab Al-Zarqawi. After the killing of al-Zarqawi in 2006, Droukdel published a statement on a website and stated "O infidels and apostates, your joy will be brief and you will cry for a long time... we are all Zarqawi." Droukdel is believed to have been responsible for introducing suicide bombing to Algeria.

== Emir of AQIM ==
Under Droukdel's leadership the GSPC sought to develop itself from a largely domestic entity into a larger player on the international terror stage. As the new leader of the GSPC, Droukdel reorganised the group, and continued targeting civilians. He was unable to quell the rumblings between factions.

In September 2006, it was announced that the GSPC had joined forces with al-Qaeda. In January 2007, the group officially changed its name to the "Al-Qaeda Organisation in the Islamic Maghreb." Droukdel played a significant role in this merger. However, the local leaders of the organisation such as Droukdel began to pursue much more independent activities and were distanced from al-Qaeda in the last quarter of 2012.

Droukdel ousted Mokhtar Belmokhtar from the organisation in late 2012 for Belmokhtar's "fractious behaviour". Journalists discovered a document attributed to Droukdel and dated 20 July 2012 in Timbuktu that criticised militants for implementing Islamic law too quickly in Mali. He believed the destruction of shrines would provoke Western governments to intervene in Mali.

== Designation ==
In December 2007, the United States Department of the Treasury imposed financial sanctions and froze Abdelmalek Droukdel's assets under Executive Order 13224.

== Death ==
The French government said on 5 June 2020 that Droukdel, and members of his inner circle, had been killed by French special forces during the Battle of Talahandak, in far north Mali two days earlier. AQIM confirmed Droukdel's death two weeks later. He was replaced by Abu Ubaidah Youssef al-Annabi as the leader of AQIM.
