= List of inventions and discoveries by women =

This page aims to list inventions and discoveries in which women played a major role.

== Medicine ==
=== Pharmaceuticals ===
Aciclovir
Gertrude B. Elion contributed to the development of aciclovir, an antiviral drug used for the treatment of herpes simplex virus infections, chickenpox, and shingles.

Artemisinin and dihydroartemisinin
Tu Youyou discovered artemisinin and dihydroartemisinin, both now standard treatments for malaria. Artemisinin is isolated from the plant Artemisia annua, sweet wormwood, a herb employed in Chinese traditional medicine.

Azathioprine
Azathioprine is an Immunosuppressive drug used in rheumatoid arthritis, granulomatosis with polyangiitis, Crohn's disease, ulcerative colitis, and in kidney transplants to prevent rejection first synthesized by George H. Hitchings and Gertrude B. Elion in 1957 .

AZT
Flossie Wong-Staal was the first scientist to clone HIV and map its genes. Gertrude Elion made foundational contributions to the development of AZT, one of the first antiretroviral medications used in the prevention and treatment of HIV/AIDS.

Chemotherapy
Jane C. Wright was the first to identify methotrexate, one of the foundational chemotherapy drugs, as an effective tool against cancerous tumors.

feeding tube
Bessie Blount Griffin used plastic, boiling water to mold the material, a file, ice pick, hammer, and some dishes to create the first feeding tube, allowed patients to control how much they would eat without assistance from others.

Mercaptopurine
Mercaptopurine is a medication for cancer and autoimmune diseases including acute lymphocytic leukemia (ALL), chronic myeloid leukemia (CML), Crohn's disease, and ulcerative colitis. It was discovered by Gertrude B. Elion and George H. Hitchings.

Pyrimethamine
Pyrimethamine, sold under the trade name Daraprim, is an anti-parasitic medication used to treat a variety of conditions including toxoplasmosis and isosporiasis. Pyrimethamine was initially developed by Nobel Prize winning scientist Gertrude Elion as a treatment for malaria.

Vitamin E
Katharine Bishop and Herbert McLean Evans co-discovered Vitamin E while studying the reproductive cycle of rats.

=== Pediatrics ===
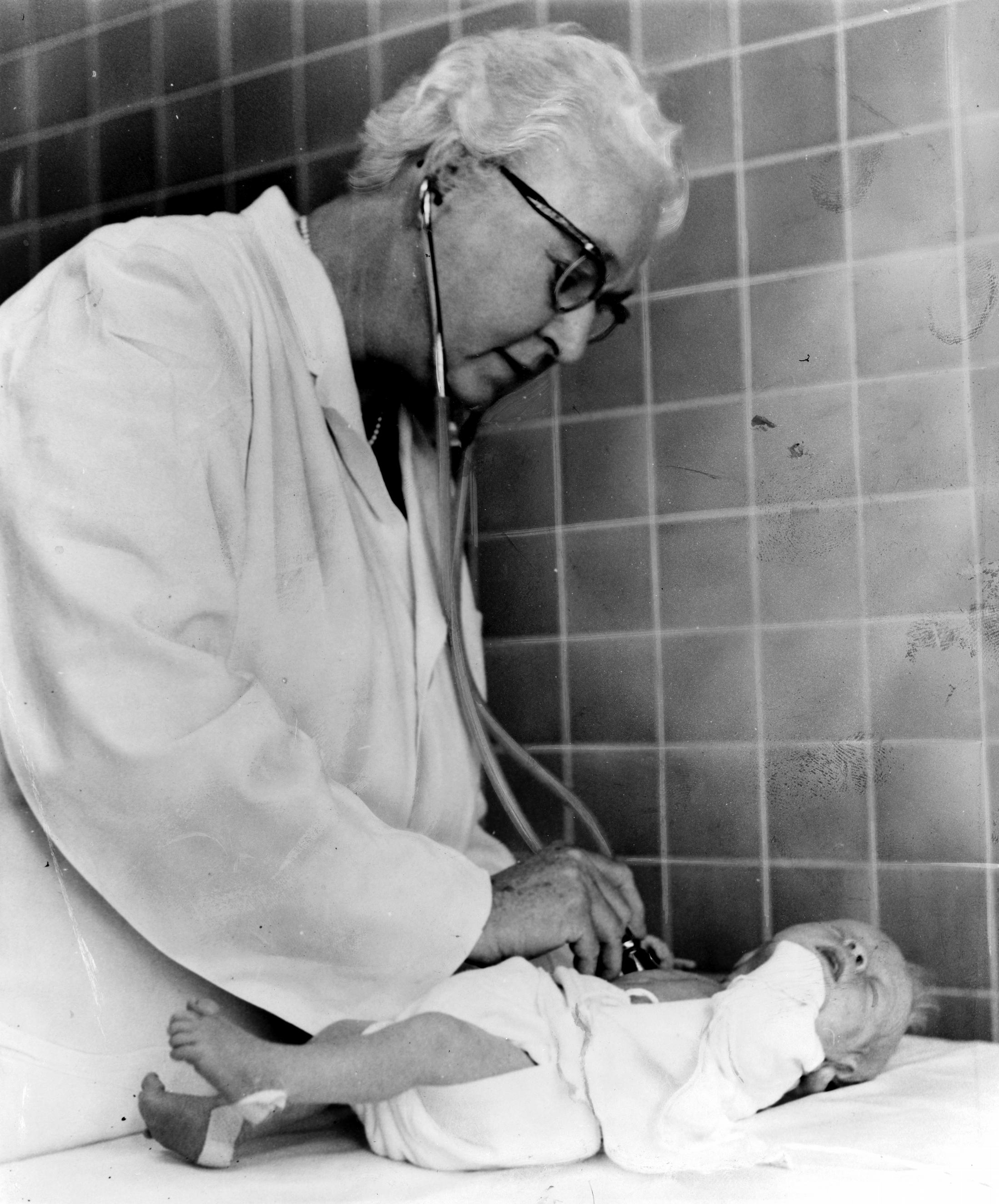
Virginia Apgar

Apgar score
Invented in 1952 by Virginia Apgar.

Disposable diapers
The first disposable diaper was invented in 1946 by Marion Donovan, a professional-turned-homemaker who wanted to ensure her children's cloth diapers remained dry while they slept. Donovan patented her design (called 'Boaters') in 1951. She also invented the first paper diapers, but executives did not invest in this idea and it was consequently scrapped for over ten years, until Procter & Gamble used Donovan's design ideas to create Pampers.

Another diaper design was created by Valerie Hunter Gordon (née de Ferranti), who patented it in 1948.

Child carriers
Snugli and Weego were invented by nurse and peacekeeper Ann Moore first in the 1960s.

Pertussis vaccine
A pioneering female American doctor, medical researcher and an outspoken voice in the pediatrics community, the supercentenarian Leila Alice Denmark (1898–2012) is credited as co-developer of the pertussis (whooping cough) vaccine.

Single hand medical syringe
Letitia Mumford Geer thought that the syringes being manufactured were difficult to use because they were often imprecise and unsanitary. This influenced her to create a more precise syringe. On February 12, 1896, Geer filed for a patent for the one-handed medical syringe design.

The entire discipline of Physical Therapy
Mary McMillan, working with Polio patients in the 1920s.

== Astronomy and astrophysics ==
Harvard Stellar Classification Scheme
The first classification of stars based on their temperature, created by Annie Jump Cannon, used in publications up to 1924.

Horsehead Nebula

The Horsehead Nebula was discovered on a telescope-photogrammetry plate by Scottish astronomer Williamina Fleming in 1888.

Beta Aurigae binary star system

The second spectroscopic binary, Beta Aurigae, was discovered in 1888 by Antonia Maury, who also calculated its orbital period.

Pulsars
Rapidly rotating neutron stars discovered by Jocelyn Bell Burnell in 1967.

The galaxy rotation problem
A major piece of evidence for the presence of dark matter in the Universe, discovered by Vera Rubin from observations of galactic rotation curves in the 1970s.

Stars luminosity
Henrietta Swan Leavitt was an American astronomer who discovered the relation between the luminosity and the period of Cepheid variable stars at the beginning of 20th century.
Merieme Chadid is a French and Moroccan astronomer and explorer who discovered hypersonic shock waves in variable stars as well as the first astronomer committed to install a large observatory at the heart of Antarctica towards an understanding of stellar evolution in the Universe by leading scientific polar explorations.

Radio astronomy
Ruby Violet Payne-Scott was an Australian pioneer in radiophysics and radio astronomy as well as the first female radio astronomer discovering Type I and Type III solar radio bursts.

Stars are primarily composed of hydrogen and helium
Cecilia Payne-Gaposchkin found in her 1925 PhD thesis that stars are primarily composed of hydrogen and helium. Thus, her thesis established that hydrogen is the most abundant element in the Universe.

When Payne's dissertation was reviewed, astronomer Henry Norris Russell dissuaded her from concluding that the composition of the Sun was predominantly hydrogen and thus very different from that of the Earth, as it contradicted the accepted wisdom at the time. She consequently described the result in her thesis as "spurious". Russell realized she was correct four years later after having derived the same result by different means and publishing it in 1929. He acknowledged Payne's work and discovery admiringly in his paper but he is often credited for the conclusions they both reached.

The new outer arm of the Milky Way
In 2004, astrophysicist and radio astronomer Naomi McClure-Griffiths identified a new spiral arm of the Milky Way galaxy.

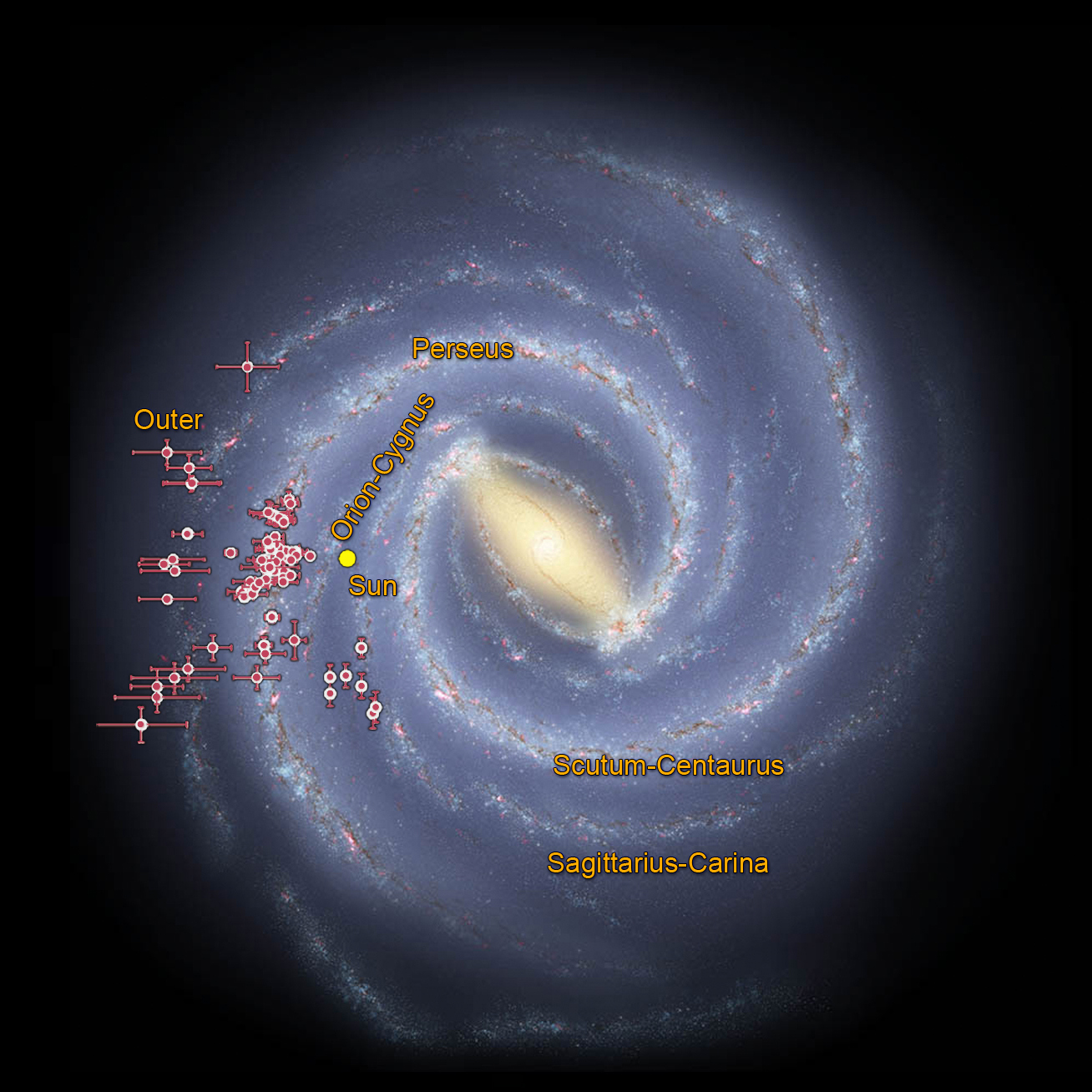
PIA19341-MilkyWayGalaxy-SpiralArmsData-WISE-20150603

== Physics ==
Radiation
Marie Skłodowska-Curie (born Maria Salomea Skłodowska) was the first woman to receive a Nobel prize for her works on radiations and, up until today, the only woman to receive two Nobel prizes (among them, one Nobel prize in chemistry for discoveries on polonium and radium). She is the sole laureate to be recognized within two distinct scientific areas.

Fanny Gates further investigated the properties of radiation. Together with Ernest Rutherford, she amassed evidence that radioactivity was not the result of any simple chemical or physical processes. In particular, Gates showed that radioactivity could not be destroyed by heat or ionization due to chemical reactions, and that radioactive materials differ from phosphorescent materials both qualitatively and quantitatively.
Chien-Shiung Wu was the first scientist to confirm Enrico Fermi's theory of radioactive beta decay. She also overturned the theory of parity in physics.

Radon
In 1901, Harriet Brooks and Ernest Rutherford contributed to the discovery of the element radon by finding evidence that the "emanation" emitted by thorium compounds was likely to be a gas. This follows work in 1899 by Pierre and Marie Curie, who observed that the gas emitted by radium remained radioactive for a month.

Kinetic energy
Emilie du Châtelet (born Gabrielle Émilie Le Tonnelier de Breteuil) translated Isaac Newton's Principia Mathematica from Latin to French during the 18th century. She carried out physics experiments, popularizing the work of Leibniz. She demonstrated that the kinetic energy of an object was proportional to its mass and the square of its velocity, and postulated a conservation law for the total energy of a system.

Heavy elements in cosmic radiation
As a graduate student, Phyllis S. Freier found evidence for the existence of elements heavier than helium in cosmic radiation. Her work was published in Physical Review in 1948 with co-authors Edward J. Lofgren, Edward P. Ney, and Frank Oppenheimer.

Beta particles are electrons.
Gertrude Scharff Goldhaber and her husband Maurice Goldhaber showed that beta particles were identical to electrons.

Top quark
Melissa Franklin's team at Fermilab found some of the first evidence for the existence of the top quark.

Nuclear shell
Maria Goeppert Mayer, a German immigrant to the US who studied at Johns Hopkins during the Great Depression, persisted in her studies even when no university would employ her and became a chemical physicist. Her most-famous contribution to modern physics was discovering the nuclear shell of the atomic nucleus, for which she won the Nobel Prize in 1963.

Slow light
Lene Hau led a Harvard University team who used a Bose–Einstein condensate to slow down a beam of light to about 17 metres per second, and, in 2001, was able to stop a beam completely.

Astatine
The Austrian physicist Berta Karlik discovered that the element 85 astatine is a product of the natural decay processes.

Bohr–van Leeuwen theorem
In her 1919 thesis, Hendrika Johanna van Leeuwen explained why magnetism is an essentially quantum mechanical effect, a result now referred to as the Bohr–van Leeuwen theorem. (Niels Bohr had arrived at the same conclusion a few years earlier.)

Francium
In 1939, Marguerite Perey, a student of Marie Curie, discovered the element francium by purifying samples of lanthanum that contained actinium. Perey first noticed that the actinium she purified was emitting unexpected radiation. After further study she was able to isolate this new element which she named "francium" for France.

Nuclear fission
Austrian–Swedish physicist Lise Meitner, together with Otto Hahn and Otto Robert Frisch, led the small group of scientists who first discovered nuclear fission of uranium when it absorbed an extra neutron. The results were published in early 1939. Meitner, Hahn and Frisch understood that the fission process, which splits the atomic nucleus of uranium into two smaller nuclei, must be accompanied by an enormous release of energy. Nuclear fission is the process exploited by nuclear reactors to generate heat and, subsequently, electricity. This process is also one of the basics of nuclear weapons that were developed in the U.S. during World War II and used against Japan in 1945.

Structure of the Milky Way
Heidi Jo Newberg's team found that Milky Way is cannibalizing stars from smaller galaxies and that the Milky Way is larger and has more ripples than was previously understood.

Chirped pulse amplification
Donna Strickland received the 2018 Nobel Prize in Physics for the discovery of chirped pulse amplification, a technique which "paved the way towards the shortest and most intense laser pulses ever created by mankind."

Semiconductor saturable-absorber mirror
semiconductor saturable absorber mirror (SESAM) invented and demonstrated by Ursula Keller in 1992.

Conwell–Weisskopf theory
One of the first ionized impurity scattering mobility models proposed by Esther Conwell in 1950.

== Chemistry ==
Catalysis
The concept of catalysis invented by Scottish chemist Elizabeth Fulhame.

Francium
A chemical element; symbol Fr, atomic number 87, extremely radioactive, discovered by Marguerite Perey in France in 1939 by purifying samples of lanthanum that contained actinium. Last element first discovered in nature.

Goldberg reaction

Irma Goldberg published a paper in 1906 on two newly discovered chemical reactions involving the presence of copper and the creation of a nitrogen-carbon bond to an aromatic halide. These reactions were subsequently named the Goldberg reaction and the Jourdan-Ullman-Goldberg reaction.

Kevlar
A powerful para-aramid synthetic fiber, developed by Stephanie Kwolek at DuPont in 1965.

Polonium and radium
The discoveries of elements radium and polonium were made by Polish chemist Marie Skłodowska-Curie through the deep study of their nature and their compounds.

Rhenium
Rhenium, a d-block transition metal with Atomic number 75, was first isolated by Ida Noddack and her husband. The existence of this element was predicted by Dmitri Mendeleev. Ida Noddack was nominated three times for the Nobel Prize in Chemistry.

Seaborgium
Carol Alonso was a co-discoverer of seaborgium, a synthetic chemical element with symbol Sg and atomic number 106.

Scotchgard
This stain repellent and durable water repellent was co-invented by chemists Patsy Sherman and Samuel Smith while working for 3M.

Langmuir–Blodgett film
The technique for making Langmuir–Blodgett film, which involves immersing a substrate into a solution to deposit a monolayer of molecules onto a substrate, was co-invented by Katharine Burr Blodgett and Irving Langmuir while working for General Electric. Earlier work by Agnes Pockels influenced the development of the trough.

Zeolite Y
Zeolite Y, a molecular sieve used to catalyse fractional distillation in petroleum refining, was invented by Edith M. Flanigen while working for Union Carbide. Flanigen also co-invented a synthetic emerald and was the first female recipient of the Perkin Medal in 1992.

Synthetic radiochemistry
Irene Joliot-Curie was awarded the 1935 Nobel Prize in Chemistry for synthesis of new radioactive elements for application in medicine. The prize was shared jointly with her husband Frédéric Joliot-Curie.

Structure of benzene
The planar structure of benzene, an important cyclic aromatic hydrocarbon, was determined by Kathleen Lonsdale using X-ray crystallography. The nature of the chemical bonds had been a mystery for many years. Alongside Marjory Stephenson, Kathleen Lonsdale was one of the first two women to be elected a Fellow of The Royal Society.

Structure of vitamin B12
The chemical structure was determined by Dorothy Hodgkin using crystallographic data. She was awarded the Nobel Prize in Chemistry for her work on Vitamin B12 and other complex molecules.

Electron microscopy
The in-situ atomic-resolution environmental transmission electron microscope (ETEM) was created by Pratibha Gai in 2009. This microscope allows for visualisation of chemical reactions at the atomic scale. Dame Gai decided not to patent her device, the culmination of 20 years' work, in order to further the advancement of science.

Photocatalysis
In 2015, Deepika Kurup invented a photocatalytic composite material that removes 100% of faecal coliform bacteria from contaminated water. Deepika has won the Discovery Education 3M Young Scientist Challenge award and The US Stockholm Junior Water Prize for her work.

Surface chemistry (surface science)
Agnes Pockels pioneered the new discipline of surface chemistry from her kitchen after being denied formal science training due to her gender. She created the Pockels Trough to measure surface tension, published several papers and was credited by Lord Rayleigh and Irving Langmuir.

Mass spectrometry
Sybil M. Rock developed the mathematical techniques used in analysing the results from mass spectrometers and devised many of the procedures for mixture analysis.

Carbon dioxide
Eunice Newton Foote was the first scientist to make the connection between the amount of carbon dioxide in our atmosphere and climate change in 1856. She discovered the warming properties of carbon dioxide and the "greenhouse effect." She was able to submit her experiment and findings at the annual meeting of the American Association for the Advancement of Science (AAAS); however, because she was a woman and not able to be a member of the organization, Professor Joseph Henry of the Smithsonian Institution presented her findings.

Bioorthogonal chemistry
The term was coined by Carolyn Bertozzi in 2003. Since its introduction, the concept of the bioorthogonal reaction has enabled the study of biomolecules such as glycans, proteins, and lipids.

== Geology ==
Earth's inner core
Discovered in 1936 by Danish seismologist Inge Lehmann. Through her work on seismology she was able to conclude that the Earth had a solid inner core and a molten outer core to explain inconsistencies in seismic wave data from earth quakes.
Documentation of all volcanos in planet Earth.
In February 2005, Rosaly Lopes – planetary scientist and volcanologist – wrote "Volcano Adventure Guide", in order to document every single volcano on planet Earth through a variety of aspects. This is the only book that addresses all volcanos on Earth; it provides information such as: volcano behavior, types of eruptions, dangers, maps, and even travel tips.

== Household ==
Square-bottom paper bag
In 1868, Margaret E. Knight invented a machine that folded and glued flat-bottomed brown paper bags familiar to shoppers today. She obtained 87 US patents that include lid-removing pliers, a numbering machine, a window frame and sash, and variants on rotary engines.

Dishwasher
Josephine Cochrane developed in 1887 the first commercially successful dishwasher, together with mechanic George Butters.

Electric refrigerator
Florence Parpart, 1914.

b

Pedal bin
Lillian Gilbreth invented the pedal bin in 1914 for the disposal of kitchen waste. The foot pedal enables the user to open the lid without touching it with their hands.

Improved ironing board
In 1892, Sarah Boone obtained a patent in the United States for improvements to the ironing board, allowing for better quality ironing for shirt sleeves.

Central heating
In 1919, Alice Parker invented a system of gas-powered central heating. While her particular design was never built, it was the first time an inventor had conceived of using natural gas to heat a personal home, which inspired the future central heating systems.

Automatic Rotimaker
In 2008, Pranoti Nagarkar-Israni invented a kitchen robot called Rotimatic, which makes rotis, tortillas, pizza crusts and puris in under a minute. She has obtained 6 patents. The product makes use of artificial intelligence and Internet of Things to understand user requirements and improve itself after each use.

Correction fluid
Bette Nesmith Graham, the founder of the Liquid Paper company, invented one of the first forms of correction fluid in 1956.

House solar heating
Hungarian-American MIT inventor Mária Telkes and American architect Eleanor Raymond created, in 1947, the Dover Sun House, the first house powered by solar energy.

Wrinkle-free fiber
Wrinkle-free fiber invented by Ruth R. Benerito. The invention was said to have "saved the cotton industry".

== Cosmetics ==
Hot comb
The hot comb was an invention developed in France as a way for women with coarse curly hair to achieve a fine straight look traditionally modeled by historical Egyptian women. However, it was Annie Malone who first patented this tool, while her protégé and former worker, Madam C. J. Walker, widened the teeth.

curling iron
Theora Stephens patents a more effective curling iron.

== Vehicle appliances ==
Windscreen wiper
Mary Anderson is credited for inventing the first functional windscreen wiper in 1903. Two other inventors, Robert Douglass and John Apjohn, also patented windscreen cleaning devices in the same year.

Car heater
Margaret A. Wilcox invented an improved car heater, which directed air from over the engine to warm the chilly toes of aristocratic 19th-century motorists, in 1893. She also invented a combined clothes and dish washer.

Airplane mufflers
Eldorado Jones is credited with inventing a light-weight electric iron, travel size iron board, and airplane mufflers in 1919.

Underwater telescope
Patented by Sarah Mather in 1845, this permitted sea-going vessels to survey the depths of the ocean. It used a camphine lamp in a glass globe that was sunk in the water. The device allowed examination of the hull and other details from a person on the deck of a boat. In 1864 Sarah Mather improved her invention to detect Confederate underwater warships.

== Computing ==
Written computer program
During a nine-month period in 1842–43, Ada Lovelace translated the memoir of Italian mathematician Luigi Menabrea. The memoir covered the Analytical Engine. The translation contained Note G which completely detailed a method for calculating Bernoulli numbers using the Analytical Engine. This note is recognized by some historians as the world's first written computer program.

Written compiler
An early compiler related tool was written by Grace Hopper, in 1952, for the A-0 programming language. She also helped to popularize the idea of machine-independent programming languages which led to the development of COBOL, one of the first high-level programming languages.

Written (programming) languages
Nine coding languages were invented by women: ARC assembly language by Kathleen Booth in 1950, Address by Kateryna Yushchenko in 1955, COBOL by Grace Hopper along with other members of the Conference on Data System Languages in 1959, FORMAC by Jean Sammet in 1962, Logo by Cynthia Solomon in 1967 with members of her team, CLU by Barbara Liskov in 1974, Smalltalk by Adele Goldberg, Diana Merry, and four main other team members at Xerox PARC in 1980, BBC BASIC by Sophie Wilson in 1981, Rocq (previously knows as Coq) by Christine Paulin-Mohring along with eight development team members of the Lab in 1991. More generally speaking, women have strongly impacted the data processing domain especially women in computing.

GIF

Invented by Lisa Gelobter.

== Mathematics ==
Daubechies wavelet
Ingrid Daubechies introduced the Daubechies wavelet and contributed to the development of the CDF wavelet, important tools in image compression.

You can't hear the shape of a drum.
In 1966, Mark Kac asked whether the shape of a drum could be determined by the sound it makes (whether a Riemannian manifold is determined by the spectrum of its Laplace–Beltrami operator). John Milnor observed that a theorem due to Witt implied the existence of a pair of 16-dimensional tori that have the same spectrum but different shapes. However, the problem in two dimensions remained open until 1992, when Carolyn S. Gordon with coauthors Webb and Wolpert, constructed a pair of regions in the Euclidean plane that have different shapes but identical eigenvalues (see figure on right).

Cauchy–Kovalevskaya theorem
In mathematics, the Cauchy–Kowalevski theorem (also written as the Cauchy–Kovalevskaya theorem) is the main local existence and uniqueness theorem for analytic partial differential equations associated with Cauchy initial value problems. A special case was proven by Augustin Cauchy (1842), and the full result by Sophia Kovalevskaya (1875).

Kovalevskaya top
In classical mechanics, the precession of a rigid body such as a top under the influence of gravity is not, in general, an integrable problem. There are however three (or four) famous cases that are integrable, the Euler, the Lagrange, and the Kovalevskaya top. The Kovalevskaya top is a special symmetric top with a unique ratio of the moments of inertia which satisfy the relation

$$I_1=I_2= 2 I_3,$$

That is, two moments of inertia are equal, the third is half as large, and the center of gravity is located in the plane perpendicular to the symmetry axis (parallel to the plane of the two equal points).

QR algorithm
In numerical linear algebra, the QR algorithm is an eigenvalue algorithm: that is, a procedure to calculate the eigenvalues and eigenvectors of a matrix. The QR algorithm was developed in the late 1950s by John G. F. Francis and by Vera N. Kublanovskaya, working independently. The basic idea is to perform a QR decomposition, writing the matrix as a product of an orthogonal matrix and an upper triangular matrix, multiply the factors in the reverse order, and iterate.

Navier–Stokes equations
Olga Ladyzhenskaya provided the first rigorous proofs of the convergence of a finite difference method for the Navier–Stokes equations. Ladyzhenskaya was on the shortlist for potential recipients for the 1958 Fields Medal, ultimately awarded to Klaus Roth and René Thom.

Braid groups are linear
Ruth Lawrence's 1990 paper, "Homological representations of the Hecke algebra", in Communications in Mathematical Physics, introduced, among other things, certain novel linear representations of the braid group — known as Lawrence–Krammer representation. In papers published in 2000 and 2001, Daan Krammer and Stephen Bigelow established the faithfulness of Lawrence's representation. This result goes by the phrase "braid groups are linear."

Recursion theory
Rózsa Péter was one of the founders of recursion theory, a branch of mathematical logic, of computer science, and of the theory of computation that originated in the 1930s with the study of computable functions and Turing degrees. The field has since expanded to include the study of generalized computability and definability. In these areas, recursion theory overlaps with proof theory and effective descriptive set theory.

Hilbert's tenth problem
Hilbert's tenth problem is the tenth on the list of mathematical problems that the German mathematician David Hilbert posed in 1900. It is the challenge to provide a general algorithm which, for any given Diophantine equation (a polynomial equation with integer coefficients and a finite number of unknowns) can decide whether the equation has a solution with all unknowns taking integer values.

For example, the Diophantine equation $3x^2-2xy-y^2z-7=0$ has an integer solution: $x=1,\ y=2,\ z=-2$. By contrast, the Diophantine equation $x^2+y^2+1=0$ has no such solution.

Hilbert's tenth problem has been solved, and it has a negative answer: such a general algorithm does not exist. This is the result of combined work of Martin Davis, Yuri Matiyasevich, Hilary Putnam and Julia Robinson which spans 21 years, with Yuri Matiyasevich completing the theorem in 1970. The theorem is now known as Matiyasevich's theorem or the MRDP theorem.

Optimal design
In the design of experiments, optimal designs (or optimum designs) are a class of experimental designs that are optimal with respect to some statistical criterion. The creation of this field of statistics has been credited to Danish statistician Kirstine Smith.

Three-gap theorem
The three-gap theorem states that if one places n points on a circle, at angles of θ, 2θ, 3θ ... from the starting point, then there will be at most three distinct distances between pairs of points in adjacent positions around the circle. When there are three distances, the larger of the three always equals the sum of the other two. Unless θ is a rational multiple of π, there will also be at least two distinct distances.

This result was conjectured by Hugo Steinhaus, and proved in the 1950s by Vera T. Sós, János Surányi, and Stanisław Świerczkowski. Its applications include the study of plant growth and musical tuning systems, and the theory of Sturmian words.

Noether normalization lemma
The Noether normalization lemma is a result of commutative algebra, introduced by Emmy Noether in 1926. It states that for any field k, and any finitely generated commutative k-algebra A, there exists a nonnegative integer d and algebraically independent elements y_{1}, y_{2}, ..., y_{d} in A such that A is a finitely generated module over the polynomial ring S:=k[y_{1}, y_{2}, ..., y_{d}].

The theorem has a geometric interpretation. Suppose A is integral. Let S be the coordinate ring of the d-dimensional affine space $\mathbb A^d_k$, and A as the coordinate ring of some other d-dimensional affine variety X. Then the inclusion map S → A induces a surjective finite morphism of affine varieties $X\to \mathbb A^d_k$. The conclusion is that any affine variety is a branched covering of affine space.

The Noether normalization lemma is an important step in proving Hilbert's Nullstellensatz.

Noether's theorem
Noether's (first) theorem states that every differentiable symmetry of the action of a physical system has a corresponding conservation law. The theorem was proven by mathematician Emmy Noether in 1915 and published in 1918, although a special case was proven by E. Cosserat & F. Cosserat in 1909. The action of a physical system is the integral over time of a Lagrangian function (which may or may not be an integral over space of a Lagrangian density function), from which the system's behavior can be determined by the principle of least action.

Noether's theorem is used in theoretical physics and the calculus of variations. A generalization of the formulations on constants of motion in Lagrangian and Hamiltonian mechanics (developed in 1788 and 1833, respectively), it does not apply to systems that cannot be modeled with a Lagrangian alone (e.g. systems with a Rayleigh dissipation function). In particular, dissipative systems with continuous symmetries need not have a corresponding conservation law.

Noether's theorem can be stated informally

If a system has a continuous symmetry property, then there are corresponding quantities whose values are conserved in time.

Noether's second theorem
In mathematics and theoretical physics, Noether's second theorem relates symmetries of an action functional with a system of differential equations. The action S of a physical system is an integral of a so-called Lagrangian function L, from which the system's behavior can be determined by the principle of least action.

Isomorphism theorems
In mathematics, specifically abstract algebra, the isomorphism theorems are three theorems that describe the relationship between quotients, homomorphisms, and subobjects. Versions of the theorems exist for groups, rings, vector spaces, modules, Lie algebras, and various other algebraic structures. In universal algebra, the isomorphism theorems can be generalized to the context of algebras and congruences.

The isomorphism theorems were formulated in some generality for homomorphisms of modules by Emmy Noether in her paper Abstrakter Aufbau der Idealtheorie in algebraischen Zahl- und Funktionenkörpern which was published in 1927 in Mathematische Annalen. Less general versions of these theorems can be found in work of Richard Dedekind and previous papers by Noether.

Three years later, B.L. van der Waerden published his influential Algebra, the first abstract algebra textbook that took the groups-rings-fields approach to the subject. Van der Waerden credited lectures by Noether on group theory and Emil Artin on algebra, as well as a seminar conducted by Artin, Wilhelm Blaschke, Otto Schreier, and van der Waerden himself on ideals as the main references. The three isomorphism theorems, called homomorphism theorem, and two laws of isomorphism when applied to groups, appear explicitly.

Lasker–Noether theorem
In mathematics, the Lasker–Noether theorem states that every Noetherian ring is a Lasker ring, which means that every ideal can be decomposed as an intersection, called primary decomposition, of finitely many primary ideals (which are related to, but not quite the same as, powers of prime ideals). The theorem was first proven by Emanuel Lasker (1905) for the special case of polynomial rings and convergent power series rings, and was proven in its full generality by Emmy Noether (1921).

The Lasker–Noether theorem is an extension of the fundamental theorem of arithmetic, and more generally the fundamental theorem of finitely generated abelian groups to all Noetherian rings. The Lasker–Noether theorem plays an important role in algebraic geometry, by asserting that every algebraic set may be uniquely decomposed into a finite union of irreducible components.

Albert–Brauer–Hasse–Noether theorem
In algebraic number theory, the Albert–Brauer–Hasse–Noether theorem states that a central simple algebra over an algebraic number field K which splits over every completion K_{v} is a matrix algebra over K. The theorem is an example of a local-global principle in algebraic number theory and leads to a complete description of finite-dimensional division algebras over algebraic number fields in terms of their local invariants. It was proved independently by Richard Brauer, Helmut Hasse, and Emmy Noether and by Abraham Adrian Albert.

The earthquake flow on Teichmüller space is ergodic
Fields medalist Maryam Mirzakhani proved the long-standing conjecture that William Thurston's earthquake flow on Teichmüller space is ergodic.

== Wireless transmission ==
Torpedoes Radio guidance device
Austrian-American Hollywood actress Hedy Lamarr, together with musician and author George Antheil, developed a mechanism for radio guidance system for Allied torpedoes which used spread spectrum and frequency hopping technology to defeat the threat of jamming by the Axis powers. Though the US Navy did not adopt frequency-hopping until the 1960s, the principles of it are now incorporated into modern Wi-Fi, CDMA and Bluetooth technology.

== Food and food appliances ==
Chocolate-chip cookies
Invented by Ruth Graves Wakefield in 1938.

Pizza saver
Patented in 1985 by Carmela Vitale of Dix Hills, New York.

Mint chocolate chip
Invented by Marilyn Ricketts in 1973.

Ice cream maker
Invented by Nancy M. Johnson in 1843.

Coffee filter
Invented by Melitta Bentz, 1908.

== Biology ==
DNA structure
Rosalind Franklin was a British molecular biologist who was instrumental in the discovery of the structure of deoxyribonucleic acid (DNA) in 1951. At King's College London where she applied X-ray diffraction to the study of biological materials, she performed several X-ray radiographs of the DNA.

Sex chromosomes
Nettie Maria Stevens is credited with the discovery of sex chromosomes.

The Cori cycle (lactic acid cycle)
Gerty Cori, together with Carl Ferdinand Cori, discovered the Cori cycle, the metabolic pathway in which lactate produced by anaerobic glycolysis in the muscles moves to the liver and is converted to glucose, which then returns to the muscles and is metabolized back to lactate.

Radioimmunoassay
Rosalyn Sussman Yalow developed the radioimmunoassay, an immunoassay that uses radiolabeled molecules in a stepwise formation of immune complexes at the Veterans Administration Hospital in the Bronx, New York. This technique is used to accurately measure levels of substances such as hormones which are found in small concentrations in the body.

Transposable elements
Barbara McClintock discovered transposable elements (also known as transposons and jumping genes), DNA sequences which change their position within the genome. Transposons make up a large fraction of the DNA in eukaryotic cells (44% of the human genome and 90% of the maize genome) and play an important role in genome function and evolution. In Oxytricha, which has a unique genetic system, these elements play a critical role in development.

Nerve growth factor
Rita Levi-Montalcini and colleague Stanley Cohen discovered nerve growth factor, a neurotrophic factor and neuropeptide primarily involved in the regulation of growth, maintenance, proliferation, and survival of certain target neurons. This discovery was recognized with the Nobel Prize in Physiology or Medicine in 1986.

Gap genes
Christiane Nüsslein-Volhard and colleague Eric Wieschaus were the first to describe gap genes, genes involved in the development of segmentation in Drosophila embryogenesis. This work was foundational to our understanding of the genetic control of embryonic development.

Telomerase
Elizabeth Blackburn, Carol W. Greider, and Jack W. Szostak co-discovered the enzyme telomerase, which replenishes the telomere, a structure found at the ends of chromosomes which protects the DNA in the rest of the chromosome from damage.

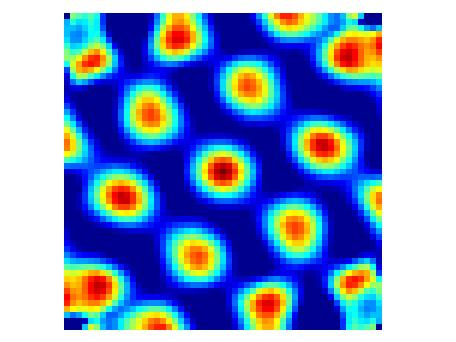
Grid cell firing rate across space

Grid cells
May-Britt Moser, together with Edvard Moser and their students Torkel Hafting, Marianne Fyhn and Sturla Molden, discovered grid cells, cells which contribute to the brain's positioning and navigation system. The grid cells of a freely moving animal fire when the animal is near the vertices of a hexagonal grid in the environment.

CRISPR gene editing
CRISPR/cas9 invented by Jennifer Anne Doudna and Emmanuelle Charpentier

== Psychology ==
Dialectical Behavior Therapy
Psychologist Marsha Linehan developed DBT in the 1980s in order to treat patients with personality disorders and suicidality. In the modern day, it has been shown to be effective against a variety of mental illnesses. A skills-based therapy drawing from Buddhism, DBT teaches the four key components of distress tolerance, mindfulness, interpersonal effectiveness, and emotion regulation.

Strange Situation Procedure
The strange situation is a procedure devised by Mary Ainsworth in the 1970s to observe attachment in children, that is relationships between a caregiver and child. The procedure played an important role in the development of attachment theory.

== See also ==
- Women in science
- Women's history
- List of women's firsts
- History of women in engineering
