= Al-Qaeda involvement in Africa =

- Part of the war on terror
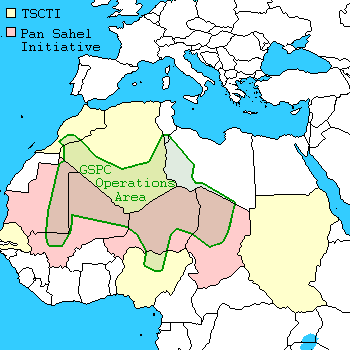
- Al-Qaeda in the Islamic Maghreb (formerly GSPC) area of operations
Date	1991–present
Location	Algeria, Eritrea, Kenya, Libya, Somalia
Status	Ongoing

Belligerents
Algeria; Kenya; Libya; Somalia	(al-Qaeda) Al-Qaeda

Al-Qaeda has operated in Africa since the early 1990s. It has carried out operations and conducted recruitment across the continent in Sudan, Kenya, Algeria, Somalia, Libya and other countries.

From 1991 to 1996, Osama bin Laden and other al-Qaeda leaders were based in Sudan before moving to Taliban ruled Afghanistan.

The major al-Qaeda branches currently operating across Africa are al-Qaeda in the Islamic Maghreb, Harakat al-Shabaab al-Mujahideen and Jama'at Nasr al-Islam wal-Muslimin.

== Background ==
In 1994, near the end of the Soviet–Afghan War, an Islamist militant group known as al-Qaeda was established by Afghan Arabs, led by Osama bin Laden from Saudi Arabia, who had fought alongside the Afghan mujahideen. After the Soviet withdrawal, the Afghan Civil War erupted. While some Arab fighters stayed in Afghanistan, most left the country, often finding themselves unwelcome by their home nations government. Many settled in neighboring Pakistan, while others joined conflicts in Kashmir, Bosnia, or Chechnya. Several al-Qaeda members quietly resided in Africa for years after receiving training in Afghanistan, forming part of a new network of sleeper cells established across the globe.

At the same time as the Soviet–Afghan War was concluding, the East African country of Sudan had a military coup in 1989. Though headed by Sudanese army Colonel Omar al-Bashir, the Islamist politician Hassan al-Turabi of the National Islamic Front (NIF) was the prime mover and sought to create an Islamic order in Sudan. Turabi declared solidarity with oppressed Muslims worldwide and invited Islamic groups such as Hamas and Hezbollah to have a safe base in Sudan.

== Sudan ==
In 1990, the National Islamic Front, the ruling party in Sudan led by Hassan al-Turabi, invited Osama bin Laden to relocate to the country. In Sudan, bin Laden sought to emulate his father, Muhammad bin Ladin, a prominent businessman and road builder in Saudi Arabia. Turabi, envisioned Sudan as the headquarters for an international Islamic revolution, and so welcomed bin Laden as "the great Islamic investor" as he opened the country to Muslims from around the world. After meeting with Sudanese intelligence officials, bin Laden dispatched associates to explore business opportunities in Sudan. Al-Qaeda representatives were impressed with the prospects and encouraged bin Laden to move the organization there. Jamal al-Fadl, a Sudanese Al-Qaeda member, facilitated the purchase of large parcels of land and secured rental properties for the group. During this period, the Saudi Binladin Group secured a contract to build an airport in Port Sudan, a project that bin Laden personally oversaw during his frequent visits to the country.

In 1992, Osama bin Laden and his family relocated from Afghanistan to Khartoum, the capital of Sudan. Bin Laden announced plans to construct a 300-kilometer road in eastern Sudan, bringing extensive heavy construction equipment with him. Over the next several years, al-Qaeda established multiple businesses—including import/export ventures, farms, and construction firms—in what could be described as a period of financial consolidation. The group also constructed a significant 1,200-kilometer (745-mile) highway linking Khartoum to Port Sudan. Most of these projects were undertaken by bin Laden's construction company, al-Hijra. When the Sudanese government was unable to pay for these services, it compensated the company with plots of land. Journalist Lawrence Wright noted that during this time, "Al-Qaeda had become largely an agricultural organization." Bin Laden was captivated by the prospects of farming in the country and under his agricultural business al-Thimar al-Mubaraka became a major player in Sudanese farming. Eventually he enjoyed a near monopoly on Sudanese farming exports as he became one of the countries largest land owners. Bin Laden engaged al-Qaeda members in business operations and recreational activities, while maintaining low-level training programs, primarily refresher courses for veterans of the Afghanistan war. There were about 500 people in Sudan who worked for Bin Laden, though never more than 100 were active members of Al-Qaeda.

According to accounts from friends and associates of Osama bin Laden during this period, he had resolved to leave al-Qaeda and fully dedicate himself to the farming industry. He avoided involvement in the Second Sudanese Civil War, resisting pressure from al-Qaeda members who urged him to participate. Despite this shift in focus, bin Laden was at a crossroads and remained deeply troubled by the continued presence of the United States military in Saudi Arabia following the Gulf War. This presence persisted despite King Fahd's earlier pledge that the troops would leave once the conflict with Saddam Hussein had ended. Bin Laden agonized over what he viewed as the beginning of a "permanent occupation" of the holy land. In Sudan, Bin Laden did not go into hiding; he was highly visible and accessible in Khartoum, frequently lecturing at local mosques. The CIA observed that he often sat openly in the front yard of his home, speaking about Islam and jihad. They concluded that, at the time, Bin Laden was functioning primarily as a financier rather than an operative. While he was willing to fund and encourage Islamic groups to wage jihad, there was no evidence linking him directly to any attacks.

In 1994, several assassins targeted a Khartoum mosque where Bin Laden often preached, opening fire in a failed assassination attempt and killing several worshipers. The incident only served to elevate his stature among many Islamists. Though the Saudi government had banished Bin Laden from the country for his statements against King Fahad's policies. Until 1994, he continued to receive about a million dollars in annual allowance. That year he was cut off after he rejected pleas from emissaries of the king to apologize to him.

In 1996, Osama bin Laden was asked to leave Sudan after the United States put the regime under extreme pressure to expel him, citing possible connections to the 1994 attempted assassination of Egyptian President Hosni Mubarak while his motorcade was in Addis Ababa, Ethiopia. Osama bin Laden finally left Sudan in a well-executed operation, arriving at Jalalabad, Afghanistan by air in late 1996 with over 200 of his supporters and their families.

== Algeria ==
The origins of Al-Qaeda Organization in the Islamic Maghreb (AQIM) lay in the Algerian Civil War. In 1992, conflict erupted between the government and Islamist factions, with the Armed Islamic Group of Algeria (GIA) emerging as the dominant force. In 1993, Osama bin Laden sent an Algerian al-Qaeda operative with $40,000 to meet rebel leaders. However, the extreme violence and international condemnation of the GIA's conduct alarmed al-Qaeda's leadership. When GIA leaders later visited Khartoum seeking additional funds, they criticized bin Laden as being "too flexible" with democrats, which enraged him and led to the withdrawal of al-Qaeda's support for the GIA entirely.

Between 1995 and 1999, internal divisions within the GIA led to the formation of the Salafi Group for Preaching and Combat (GSPC). The GSPC originated as a field commanders’ revolt against the central leadership of the GIA. It was significantly smaller than the GIA but was more cohesive and contact was reestablished between GSPC and Al-Qaeda after its break from the GIA. This relationship eventually culminated in the GSPC's pledge of allegiance to al-Qaeda in 2003, which would result in the formation of AQIM three-year later.

During the mid-2000s many members of the GSPC/AQIM went abroad to fight against American forces during the Iraq War. In 2006, GSPC renewed its pledge to allegiance to al-Qaeda, and in January 2007 it merged with the organization to form the Al-Qaeda Organization in the Islamic Maghreb. While AQIM maintained a presence in northern Algeria where the leadership was based and occasionally carried out attacks, the focus of the organization was in the Sahara. The leader of AQIM, Abdelmalek Droukdel of Algeria, formed a close relationship with Abu Musab al-Zarqawi, the leader of Al-Qaeda in Iraq and released statements in each other's support. AQIM adopted suicide bombings from Al-Qaeda in Iraq, which had hardly been used by the GIA during the civil war.

In the years following the formation of AQIM, government forces and military installations across the region—including in Algeria, Tunisia, Mali and other nations were repeatedly targeted. However, these attacks are often underreported in Western media. AQIM's strategic leadership is based in the mountainous Kabylie region of Algeria, where ethnic Berbers have long struggled with the central government for greater autonomy.

== Kenya ==
While al-Qaeda was based in Sudan during the early 1990s, the group's military chief, Abu Ubaidah al-Banshiri, established an East Africa cell. Operating under a new identity in Kenya, he married a local woman and posed as a mining businessman while preparing for al-Qaeda's "first great strike against America." The CIA had known followers of bin Laden had been operating in Nairobi, Kenya's capital, and the American Federal Bureau of Investigation (FBI) made several unannounced visits to the homes of suspected militants living in Kenya over the summer of 1997. Osama bin Laden's secretary, Wadih el-Hage, resided in the city. In August 1997, FBI and CIA officials searched el-Hage's home and uncovered evidence confirming al-Qaeda's existence. Although U.S. authorities suspected the organization was planning an operation, they believed it to be a low-level plot that had likely been abandoned following the discovery of the Nairobi safe house. Despite believe that they had disrupted al-Qaeda's East African cell, operatives trained in Afghanistan stayed behind and continued plotting to strike American targets.

During August 1998, Al-Qaeda carried out the United States embassy bombings in Kenya and Tanzania. In the aftermath of the attacks, with the US carried military strikes under Operation Infinite Reach in both Sudan and Afghanistan. Fax and satellite phone calls between Africa and Afghanistan along with electronic intercepts left little doubt in the CIA that Osama bin Laden had planned, funded and ordered the attacks. This represented the first time evidence existed that he had been responsible for the deaths of Americans.

In 2002 another successful terrorist attack in Kenya after the U.S. embassy bombing, a car bomb attack on a Mombasa resort hotel popular among Israeli tourists claimed the lives of 15 people. The hotel bombing occurred 20 minutes after a failed attack on an airplane, when a militant fired an SA-7 man-portable air-defense system against an Israeli airliner carrying 261 passengers, which was taking off from the airport; the missile seemingly failed to track its target, nor did it detonate, and landed in an empty field.

== Tanzania ==
Al-Qaeda's military chief Abu Ubaidah al-Banshiri, who was then based in Kenya, was killed traveling to Tanzania when the MV Bukoba sank in Lake Victoria only several days after Osama bin Laden had left Sudan for Afghanistan in 1996. After a raid of Osama bin Laden's secretary, Wadih el-Hage's safe house in Kenya during 1997, U.S. authorities discovered he had been making frequent trips to Tanzania.

During August 1998, Al-Qaeda carried out the United States embassy bombings in Kenya and Tanzania.

== Libya ==
Al-Qaeda Organization in the Islamic Maghreb currently has a presence in Libya that has been described as "wide but patchy". AQIM has territorial footholds from the southwestern desert up through the coastal northeast.

The Libyan Islamic Fighting Group (LIFG) was formed in 1995 by Libyan veterans of the Soviet–Afghan War who were angered by Muammar Gaddafi's oppression of Islamists in the country. The LIFG considering Ghaddafi an illegitimate leader and sought to overthrow him. During 1995–1996, the group waged a serious guerrilla campaign against the regime, but was brutally suppressed by the government by mid-1996. After the defeat of LIFG, many members fled abroad to Afghanistan and Pakistan. In 2001, the group was added to a UN list of individuals and institutions "belonging to, or associated with, al-Qaeda". Al-Qaeda aligned members did not control the groups trajectory inside Libya.

As the LIFG was reconciling with the Gadhafi regime during the mid-2000s, many young Libyan jihadists went abroad to join Al-Qaeda in Iraq (AQI) to fight American forces. This foreshadowed a future break between younger jihadists and the LIFG-era ones. During 2007 a prominent LIFG abroad, Abu Layth al-Libi, announced the group had merged with Al-Qaeda, but the claim was rejected by LIFG members inside Libya. Later that year, Ayman al-Zawahiri claimed in a 28-minute recording posted on an Islamic website that "...members of the Libyan Islamic Fighting Group announce that they are joining the al-Qaeda group ..."

Abdelhakim Belhadj, a prominent rebel commander during the 2011 Libyan civil war, in an interview with the Italian newspaper Il Sole 24 Ore admit that many of his recruits had al-Qaeda links. One of the major factions within the Libyan National Liberation Army was the Libyan Islamic Movement. The group, formerly known as the Libyan Islamic Fighting Group, is well known to have had links to Maghreb faction of al-Qaeda.

On 1 November 2011, less than a month after the death of Muammar Gaddafi, the al-Qaeda flag was seen flying off the roof of a courthouse in Benghazi's city center. The extent of al-Qaeda's involvement is not yet known. Concerns have been voiced about what role MI6 played in collaborating with the Libyan Islamic Movement. The White House Deputy National Security Adviser John Brennan said "I'm concerned about what is going on inside of Libya because there's been a fair amount of disorder and upheaval in the country", "The weapons stock piles – whether we're talking about missile systems or we're talking about automatic weapons – these are things that we and our European allies are working very closely with the TNC [Transitional National Council] and Libyan authorities to get some control over. It's a big country, there were a lot of weapons depots that were scattered throughout the country and we're working again with the TNC and Europeans as well as the regional states. [...] (we are) very concerned about making sure that we do everything possible to prevent al-Qaeda from acquiring these weapons and threatening them.".

After AQIM was scattered by Operation Serval in 2013, the organization began using southern Libya as a safe haven.

== Somalia ==
The Sudanese government and Al-Qaeda feared the Americans intended to use US led United Nations operation in Somalia as a springboard to overthrow Khartoum. Osama claimed to have sent 250 men to Somalia, but according the Sudanese intelligence the figure was "only a handful". The men reportedly provided training to those opposing UNOSOM II. Though the claims of Al-Qaeda involvement have been widely disputed. Al-Qaeda defectors claimed to have gone to Somalia to train fighters and provide money. There is no evidence that al-Qaeda was involved in training Muhammed Farrah Aidids forces or that the group participated in any of the battle between Somali and US/UN forces. Dozens of Somalis trained by the Afghan mujahideen during the Soviet–Afghan War had returned to join the war against UNOSOM II. Fighters of the Somali Islamist group, Al-Itihaad Al-Islamyia directly participated in the Battle of Mogadishu, and allegations of Al-Qaeda links during the conflict with US/UN forces were largely connected to the group. The impact of the training is contested; with Mark Bowden contending that before the battle, the Al-Qaeda coached Somali fighters in using rocket-propelled grenades. Jonathan Randal notes no evidence exists for this, and that downing helicopters by aiming for their rotors had been a well known combat technique since the Vietnam War.

Osama bin Laden later claimed in interviews that "Arab holy warriors" played a role in the battles against US troops. However, these assertions were discredited by eyewitnesses in Mogadishu and dismissed by numerous observers as self-aggrandizing claims. While Bin Laden hinted at involvement, he never explicitly claimed that Al-Qaeda had participated in the Battle of Mogadishu.Ahmed Godane, the leader of Al-Shabaab, later claimed that three members of the group were in Mogadishu during fighting with American forces. This has also been dismissed by observers as a self-serving proclamation. Ali Soufan claims an Al-Qaeda operative named Zachariah al-Tunisi downed a Black Hawk. Deputy to Osama Bin Laden, Mohammed Atef, visited Somalia during 1992 and 1993, but Aidid's men had forced him to flee for his life. A 1998 indictment named several al-Qaeda members for involvement in Somalia during 1993. A document recovered from al-Qaeda operatives computer "made a tentative link" to fighting in Somalia and were used to indict bin Laden in 1998, though the charges on Somalia were later dropped.

Alex de Waal, Lawrence Wright, Jonathan Randal and other journalists/academics have noted that despite assertions by some parties of an Al-Qaeda presence during the battle, no evidence exists to support these claims. American journalist Scott Peterson observed, after extensive interviews with Somalis involved in the conflict with UNOSOM wrote, "Somalis laugh at this claim that bin Laden helped them and say—unanimously—that they never even heard of bin Laden until he began boasting about Somalia years later."

Before the full scale Ethiopian invasion of Somalia in late 2006, the United States Assistant Secretary of State issued a statement openly accusing the Islamic Courts Union leadership of being members of Al-Qaeda. Herman Cohen, the US Assistant Secretary of State for African Affairs, noted the US decision making had been influenced by false Ethiopian intelligence. According to Ted Dagne, an Africa specialist for the US Congressional Research Service, the Islamic Courts had committed no act or provocation to initiate the Ethiopian invasion. American historian William R. Polk observes that the invasion had been unprovoked.

During fighting in Somalia that took place in January 2007, the US claimed that it had successfully targeted Al-Qaeda operatives responsible for the 1998 embassy bombings, but later downgraded those who had been killed in the attacks as being 'associates with terrorists' instead. US airstrikes failed at getting the Al-Qaeda operatives alleged to be present, instead killing civilians and Islamic fighters who had never been accused of any crime. In March 2007, a White House study found that 'despite the ouster' of the Islamic Court Union, Somalia was a growing regional security threat and 'safe haven for terrorists'. Many ICU affiliates had been killed during the invasion, leaving a vacuum for the small group of several hundred youth that served as the ICU's Shabaab militia to gain prominence. As a result of the US supported invasion, Al-Shabaab morphed from a fringe movement to a serious insurgent force. After the killing of the groups leader Aden Hashi Ayro in 2008, Al-Shabaab began publicly courting Osama bin Laden in a bid to become part of Al-Qaeda, but was rebuffed by bin Laden. Several months after the Ethiopian withdrawal, Foreign Affairs noted that Al-Qaeda's foothold in Somalia post-occupation was in significant part the result of the invasion. In fall 2009, AQ operative Saleh Ali Saleh Nabhan was killed during a US military raid in Somalia and in 2011 AQ operative Fazul Abdul Muhammed was killed by Somali government forces in Mogadishu. Following the killing of Osama bin Laden in 2011, Al-Shabaab pledged allegiance to Al-Qaeda in 2012.

== Mali ==
Mali possesses an environment more conducive for jihadist activity than any other Sahelian country. At some point in 2009, AQIM moved in northern Mali. The period from January 2012 to January 2013 saw some of Al-Qaeda in the Islamic Maghreb greatest successes. As northern Mali slipped out of the central government's control, AQIM moved from the shadows to center stage. AQIM initially acted as a supporting actor in other groups’ bids for control but then came to co-manage the emirate that took power. After the French-led military intervention Operation Serval which began in January 2013, AQIM and its allies were scattered.

By 2015 Mali was facing a resurgent AQIM. Attacks by insurgents inflicted many casualties on local security forces and made the United Nations Multidimensional Integrated Stabilization Mission in Mali (MINUSMA) one of the most dangerous UN operations ever.

== Mauritania ==
From 2005 to 2011, the Salafi Group for Preaching and Combat (GSPC) and its successor, AQIM carried out operations in Mauritania. In the mid-2000s, the GSPC/AQIM had some success in building local Mauritanian cells, particularly in the capital Nouakchott. After 2011, AQIM attacks on Mauritania largely ceased. Neighboring Mali was effectively a pressure release for the Mauritanian government, as even during the mid-2000s, Mauritanian jihadists seeking training from AQIM tended to did so outside of the country, particularly in northern Mali.

After Osama bin Laden's death in 2011, documents found in his compound revealed discussions about a potential negotiated settlement between al-Qaeda, represented by AQIM, and the government of Mauritania. One document, dated March 2010, proposed an agreement under which the Mauritanian government would release all imprisoned AQIM members and refrain from arresting other militants and students. In addition, the plan called for an annual payment of 10–20 million euros to al-Qaeda, in exchange for which the group would cease military activities in Mauritania. Despite these discussions, it is doubtful that any formal agreement was ever implemented. Former Mauritanian al-Qaeda member Mahfouz Ould al-Walid dismissed the idea as "far-fetched." He noted that Mauritania's primary security interest appeared to be limiting military operations against al-Qaeda to within its own borders, provided that al-Qaeda or other armed groups did not interfere with Mauritania's security. Ould al-Walid argued that Mauritania's refusal to join the war on terror in Mali conveyed to AQIM that the country would not target them outside its borders—though this stance did not constitute an explicit deal. AQIM declared that their war in Mali would only involve France and those African governments that were directly involved.

== See also ==
- Al-Qaeda involvement in the Middle East
- Al-Qaeda involvement in Europe

== Bibliography ==
- Wright, Lawrence (2006). The Looming Tower: Al-Qaeda and the Road to 9/11. New York: Knopf. ISBN 037541486X.
- Thurston, Alexander (2020). Jihadists of North Africa and the Sahel: Local Politics and Rebel Groups. Cambridge University Press.
