= Al-Qaeda involvement in Asia =

- Part of war on terrorism
- Flag of Al-Qaeda
Date	1990s–present
Location	Afghanistan, Pakistan, India, Indonesia, Philippines, Thailand, and other countries in Asia
Result	Ongoing

Belligerents
United States; NATO; Afghanistan (2001 — 2021); Pakistan; India; Philippines; Indonesia; Thailand; Australia; New Zealand	(al-Qaeda) Al-Qaeda; Affiliated groups: Taliban; Lashkar-e-Taiba; Jemaah Islamiyah (Until June 2024); Jama'at al-Tawhid wal-Jihad (until 2004); Al-Qaeda in Iraq (2004-2006); Islamic State of Iraq; Islamic State of Iraq and the Levant (until 2014); (Islamic State) Abu Sayyaf; Jaish-e-Mohammed; Islamic Movement of Uzbekistan; East Turkestan Islamic Movement; Al-Nusra Front (Jan 2012 - July 2016); (Islamic State) Al-Qaeda in the Arabian Peninsula	Islamic State (since 2014); Khorasan Province; Pakistan Province; Yemen Province	Iran (United Arab Republic) Ba'athist Syria (Until December 8 2024); Houthis; Supported by: Russia

Commanders and leaders
(United States) Bill Clinton; (United States) George W. Bush; (United States) Barack Obama; (United States) Joe Biden; (United States) Donald Trump	(al-Qaeda) Osama bin Laden X; (al-Qaeda) Ayman al-Zawahiri X; (al-Qaeda) Saif al-Adel; Abu Musab al-Zarqawi X; (Taliban) Mullah Omar #	(Islamic State) Abu Bakr al-Baghdadi X; (Islamic State) Abu Ibrahim al-Hashimi al-Qurashi ‡‡; (Islamic State) Abu al-Hasan al-Hashimi al-Qurashi ‡‡; (Islamic State) Abu al-Hussein al-Husseini al-Qurashi ‡‡; (Islamic State) Abu Hafs al-Hashimi al-Qurashi	(United Arab Republic) Bashar al-Assad (surrendered); (Iran) Ali Khamenei X; (Iran) Mojtaba Khamenei (WIA); (Iran) Qasem Soleimani X; Abdul Malik al-Houthi

It is believed that members of Al-Qaeda are hiding along the border of Afghanistan and northwest sections of Pakistan. In Iraq, elements loosely associated with al-Qaeda, in the Jama'at al-Tawhid wal-Jihad organization commanded by Abu Musab al-Zarqawi, have played a key role in the War in Iraq.

== Iraq ==
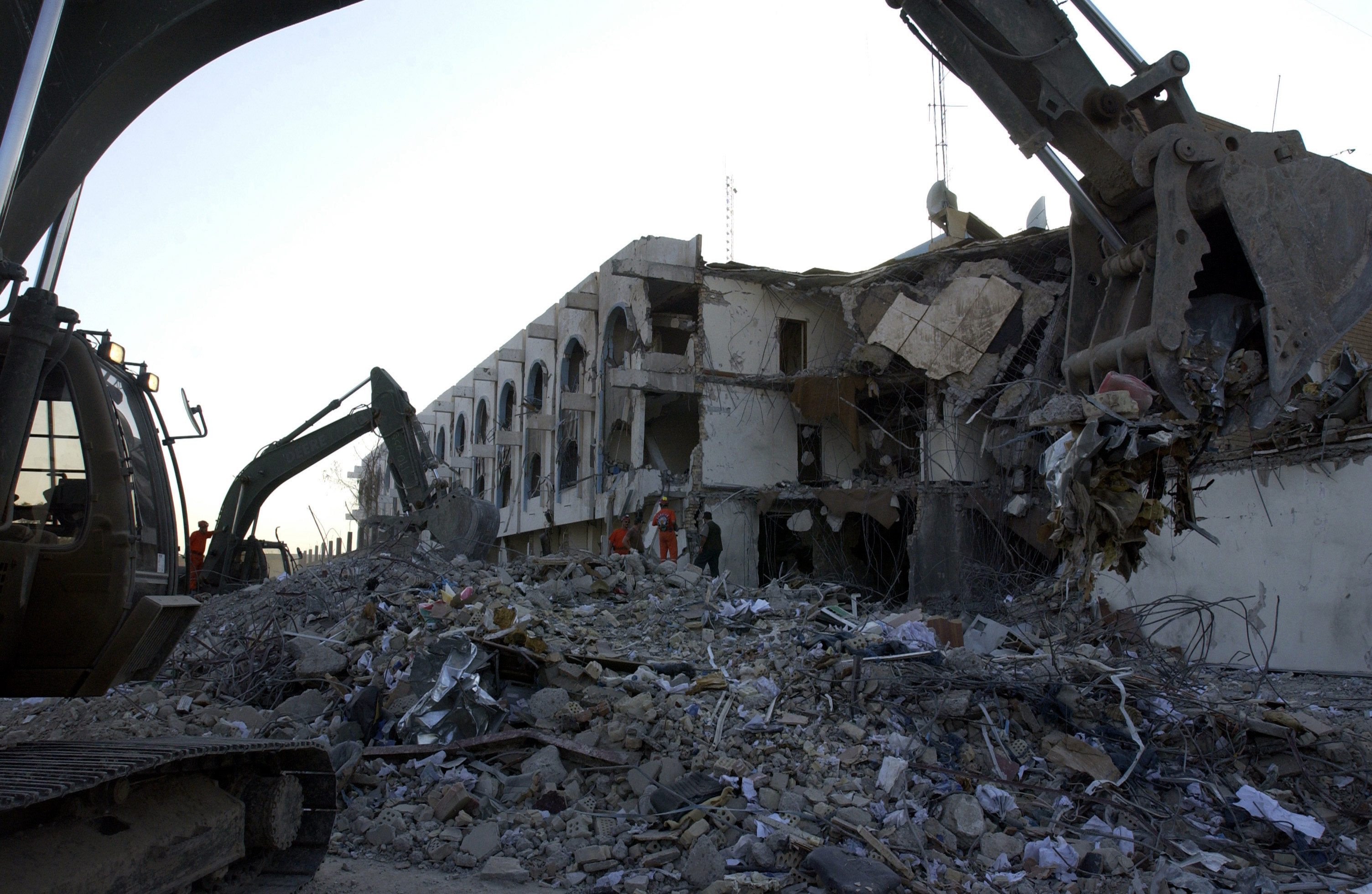
Aftermath of the Canal Hotel bombing

Osama bin Laden first took interest in Iraq when the country invaded Kuwait in 1990, raising concerns the secular Baathist government of Iraq might next set its sights on Saudi Arabia. In a letter sent to King Fahd, he offered to send an army of mujahedeen to defend Saudi Arabia, but the offer was rebuffed.

In November 2001, a month after the 11 September attacks, Mubarak al-Duri was contacted by Sudanese intelligence services who informed him that the FBI had sent Jack Cloonan and several other agents, to speak with a number of people known to have ties to Bin Laden. al-Duri and another Iraqi colleague agreed to meet with Cloonan in a safe house overseen by the intelligence service. They were asked whether there was any possible connection between Saddam Hussein and al-Qaeda, and laughed stating that Bin Laden hated the dictator who he believed was a "Scotch-drinking, woman-chasing apostate."

Links between Saddam's regime and al-Qaeda, as claimed by the Bush administration (which formed a crucial part of the WMD justification for the Iraq invasion), were non-existent or exaggerated, according to the report of both the United States government's 9/11 Commission and the Pentagon; despite these conclusions, Vice President Dick Cheney has continued to publicly assert an Iraqi–al-Qaeda link. The US claimed that al-Qaeda was in contact with the Kurdish Islamist group Ansar al-Islam from its inception in 1999; however, Ansar al-Islam's founder, Mullah Krekar, has staunchly denied any such link.

Since the 2003 invasion of Iraq, elements at first loosely associated with al-Qaeda, commanded by Abu Musab al-Zarqawi, have supported local resistance to the occupying coalition forces and the emerging government, particularly targeting Iraq's Shia majority. They have been implicated in the bombing of the United Nations headquarters in Iraq, as well as hundreds of other small and large scale attacks on the military and civilian targets. Eventually, al-Zarqawi claimed allegiance to bin Laden in October 2004.

Al-Zarqawi was killed by U.S. air strikes on a safe house near Baqubah on 7 June 2006. Before his death, he was allegedly trying to use Iraq as a launching pad for international terrorism, most notably dispatching suicide bombers to attack hotels and government targets in Jordan. Since the killing of al-Zarqawi, it was believed that Abu Ayyub al-Masri took over as head of "al-Qaeda in Iraq". On 3 September 2006, the second-in-command of "al-Qaeda in Iraq", Hamed Jumaa Farid al-Saeedi (also known as Abu Humam or Abu Rana), was arrested north of Baghdad, along with a group of his aides and followers.

A 39-page document retrieved in November and a 16-page document retrieved in October give insight on how Al-Qaeda in Iraq is in panic and fear. The documents reveal how local fighters are being mistreated by the foreign fighters and labeled as "scoundrels, sectarians, and non-believers." Abu-Tariq, states that the number of fighters has dwindled from 600 to 20 fighters.

== Israel and Palestine ==
Bin Laden and Ayman al-Zawahiri repeatedly referred to the Palestinian cause in their manifestos and interviews.

Jund Ansar Allah, a group which claims to be inspired by Al-Qaeda, is active in the Gaza Strip.

Members of an al-Qaeda cell were convicted of the 2009 Murder of Yafim Weinstein near Nazareth.

== Lebanon ==
Shakir al-Abssi, a former associate of al-Qaeda in Iraq, recruited Palestinian refugees in Lebanon into Fatah al-Islam and rose against the government. The exact nature of the group's al-Qaeda links remains a matter of controversy.

== Saudi Arabia ==
On February 3, 2009, the government of Saudi Arabia published a list of 85 suspected terrorists. One key aspect of its international involvement has been to make alliances, which are often "underutilized.".

The Saudi government believed that all of these men were living outside of Saudi Arabia, and encouraged them to surrender themselves at the closest Saudi Embassy. Many of those named on the list were believed to be in Asia.

== Yemen ==
Al-Qaeda was responsible for the USS Cole bombing which was a suicide bombing attack against the U.S. Navy destroyer USS Cole (DDG 67) on 12 October 2000, while it was harbored in the Yemeni port of Aden. Seventeen American sailors were killed.

== See also ==
- Al-Qaeda involvement in Europe
- Al-Qaeda involvement in Africa
- Ghriba synagogue bombing
- Riyadh compound bombings
- 2004 Khobar massacre
- 2005 Amman bombings
- 2005 Sharm el-Sheikh attacks
