= Association of Pizza Delivery Drivers =

Former trade union of the United States

- Formation: 2002
- Type: Trade union
- Members: 1,000

The Association of Pizza Delivery Drivers (APDD) was a U.S. labor union representing pizza and other ready-to-eat food drivers. This union had nearly 1,000 members across 46 states. The APDD was unique in that it was one of the first unions to be all electronic, operating exclusively over the internet. This union was funded entirely by donations, rather than dues.

Related to one of APDD's certification elections, the National Labor Relations Board ruled in October 2004 that delivery drivers may be considered for organization separately from employees in the rest of the pizza store. This was decided on the basis that delivery drivers have vastly different responsibilities and duties than employees in the rest of the store.

APDD sought to increase wages for delivery drivers, mileage re-imbursement, and to enhance safety procedures related to delivery.

== See also ==
- Pizza delivery
