= Engineering psychology =

Human behavior in the design and operation of systems and technology

Engineering psychology is the science of human behavior and capability applied to the design and operation of systems and technology. As an applied field of psychology and an interdisciplinary part of ergonomics (which is also known as human factors engineering or human factors psychology), it aims to improve the relationships between people and machines by redesigning equipment, interactions, or the environment in which they take place. The work of an engineering psychologist is often described as making the relationship more "user-friendly."

== Overview ==
Engineering psychology is concerned with the adaptation of the equipment and environment to people, based upon their psychological capacities and limitations with the objective of improving overall system performance, involving human and machine elements Engineering psychologists strive to match equipment requirements with the capabilities of human operators by changing the design of the equipment.

An example of this matching was the redesign of the mailbags used by letter carriers. Engineering psychologists discovered that mailbag with a waist-support strap, and a double bag that requires the use of both shoulders, reduces muscle fatigue. Another example involves the cumulative trauma disorders grocery checkout workers suffered as the result of repetitive wrist movements using electronic scanners. Engineering psychologists found that the optimal checkout station design would allow for workers to easily use either hand to distribute the workload between both wrists. Research by engineering psychologists has demonstrated that using cell-phones while driving degrades performance by increasing driver reaction time, particularly among older drivers, and can lead to higher accident risk among drivers of all ages. Research findings such as these have supported governmental regulation of cell-phone use.

== History ==
Engineering psychology was created from within experimental psychology. Engineering psychology started during World War I (1914). The reason why this subject was developed during this time was because many of America's weapons were failing; bombs not falling in the right place to weapons attacking normal marine life. The fault was traced back to human errors. One of the first designs to be built to restrain human error was the use of psychoacoustics by S.S. Stevens and L.L. Beranek were two of the first American psychologists called upon to help change how people and machinery worked together. One of their first assignments was to try and reduce noise levels in military aircraft. The work was directed at improving intelligibility of military communication systems and appeared to have been very successful. However it was not until after August 1945 that levels of research in engineering psychology began to increase significantly. This occurred because the research that started in 1940 now began to show.

Lillian Gilbreth combined the talents of an engineer, psychologist and mother of twelve. Her study of human factors made her successful in the implementation of time and motion studies and scientific management. She went on to pioneer ergonomics in the kitchen, inventing the pedal bin, for example.

In Britain, the two world wars generated much formal study of human factors which affected the efficiency of munitions output and warfare. In World War I, the Health of Munitions Workers Committee was created in 1915. This made recommendations based upon studies of the effects of overwork on efficiency which resulted in policies of providing breaks and limiting hours of work, including avoidance of work on Sunday. The Industrial Fatigue Research Board was created in 1918 to take this work forward. In WW2, researchers at Cambridge University such as Frederic Bartlett and Kenneth Craik started work on the operation of equipment in 1939 and this resulted in the creation of the Unit for Research in Applied Psychology in 1944.

== Related subjects ==
- Cognitive ergonomics and cognitive engineering — studies cognition in work settings, in order to optimize human well-being and system performance. It is a subset of the larger field of human factors and ergonomics.
- Applied psychology — The use of psychological principles to overcome problems in other domains. It has been argued that engineering psychology is separate from applied (cognitive) psychology because advances in cognitive psychology have infrequently informed engineering psychology research. Surprisingly, work in engineering psychology often seems to inform developments in cognitive psychology. For example, engineering psychology research has enabled cognitive psychologists to explain why GUIs seem easier to use than command-line interfaces.

=== Human factors and ergonomics ===
Human factors is broader than engineering psychology, which is focused specifically on designing systems that accommodate the information-processing capabilities of the brain. Although the work in the respective fields differ, these fields share the same objectives, which are to optimize the effectiveness and efficiency with which human activities are conducted, as well as to improve the general quality of life through increased safety, reduced fatigue and stress, increased comfort, and satisfaction.

The field of ergonomics is based on scientific studies of ordinary people in work situations and is applied to the design of processes and machines, to the layout of work places, to methods of work, and to the control of the physical environment, in order to achieve greater efficiency of both men and machines An example of an ergonomics study is the evaluation of the effects of screwdriver handle shape, surface material and workpiece orientation on torque performance, finger force distribution and muscle activity in a maximum screwdriving torque task. Another example of an ergonomics study is the effects of shoe traction and obstacle height on friction. Similarly, many topics in ergonomics deal with the actual science of matching man to equipment and encompasses narrower fields such as engineering psychology.

At one point in time, the term human factors was used in place of ergonomics in Europe. Human factors involve interdisciplinary scientific research and studies to seek to realize greater recognition and understanding of the worker's characteristics, needs, abilities, and limitations when the procedures and products of technology are being designed. This field utilizes knowledge from several fields such as mechanical engineering, psychology, and industrial engineering to design instruments.

== Bibliography ==
- Stanley N. Roscoe (1997), The Adolescence of Engineering Psychology, Human Factors and Ergonomics Society, archived from the original on 28 September 2011
- Francis Durso, Patricia DeLucia (2010), "Engineering Psychology", The Corsini Encyclopedia of Psychology, vol. 2, John Wiley and Sons, pp. 573–576, ISBN 978-0-470-17026-7
- Wickens, Christopher D.; Hollands, J.G. (2000), Engineering Psychology and Human Performance, Prentice-Hall, ISBN 978-0-321-04711-3
- Journal of Engineering Psychology
- Howell, William Carl (1971). Engineering Psychology: Current Perspectives in Research. New York: Appleton-Century-Crofts. ISBN 978-0-390-46456-9.
- Wickens, Christopher D. (1984). Engineering Psychology and Human Performance. Columbus: Merrill.
