= Ann Moore =

Ann or Anne Moore may refer to:

- Ann Moore (equestrian) (born 1950), 1972 Olympic silver medalist in show jumping
- Ann Moore (impostor) (1761–1813), notorious as the fasting-woman of Tutbury
- Ann Moore (inventor) (born 1934), inventor of the Snugli
- Ann S. Moore (born 1950), CEO of Time Inc.
- Anne Elizabeth Moore, editor, artist, and author
- Anne Carroll Moore (1871–1961), American librarian

== See also ==
- Annie Moore (disambiguation)
