= Annie Moore =

Annie Moore may refer to:

- Annie Moore (immigrant) (1877–1923), Irish immigrant to America, first immigrant to pass through Ellis Island
- Annie Carroll Moore (1871–1961), American author and illustrator
- Annie Carter Moore, English author Beatrix Potter's childhood governess

== See also ==
- Ann Moore (disambiguation)
