= Al-Qaeda activities in Europe =

A flag used by al-Qaeda

The international activities of al-Qaeda includes involvements in Europe, where members of the group have been involved in militant and terrorist activities in several countries. Al-Qaeda has been involved in or accused of committing the 2004 Madrid train bombings, 2010 Moscow Metro bombings, 2011 Domodedovo International Airport bombing, and the January 2015 Île-de-France attacks.

== Eastern Europe ==
=== North Caucasus ===
Al-Qaeda linked militants organized around the Caucasus Emirate have been involved in the Second Chechen War and the Insurgency in the North Caucasus. In August 2009 it was reported that during a raid the Russian police had killed an Algerian-born militant in Dagestan who according to the Federal Security Service, was "the al-Qaeda coordinator in Dagestan". The militant was an Algerian national known as "Doctor Mohammed" and was thought to be a member of the 'Jamaat Shariat of Dagestan'

In 2010, Russian police shot and killed a militant in the Russian republic of Dagestan. The man was later determined to be one of the co-founders of the North Caucasus branch of al-Qaeda. The man's name was Mohamed Shaaban.

== Northern Europe ==
=== Sweden ===
On 11 December 2010, a man linked to al-Qaeda exploded a car bomb and a suicide bomb in Stockholm, killing only himself and injuring two others. Firefighters reported that the car had a gas cylinder, resulting in further explosions. He was later revealed to be Taimour Abdulwahab al-Abdaly, an Iraqi man, who was born in Baghdad and was granted Swedish citizenship in 1992.

=== United Kingdom ===
In 2003 Tony Blair sent armoured vehicles and hundreds of troops to London Heathrow Airport because the UK security services claimed there was a planned al-Qaeda attack. MI5 said they received detailed intelligence in February 2003 about a plot to hijack planes flying from Eastern Europe and to fly them into Heathrow, to punish the United Kingdom for supporting the Iraq War.

The men behind the 2006 transatlantic aircraft plot reportedly had links to al-Qaeda. MI5 and the U.S. Department of Homeland Security accused al-Qaeda of committing the attack. Osama bin Laden also made a video of the suicide bombing. In September 2009, Tanvir Hussain, Assad Sarwar, and Ahmed Abdullah Ali were convicted of conspiring to activate bombs disguised as drinks on aircraft leaving from London and going to North America. British and US security officials said the plan – unlike many recent homegrown European terrorist plots – was directly linked to al-Qaeda and guided by senior Islamist militants in Pakistan.

== Southern Europe ==
=== Bosnian War ===
During the Bosnian War in the early 1990s, al-Qaeda is considered to have been involved with organising volunteers for the Bosnian mujahideen. Al-Qaeda leaders, including bin Laden and Ayman al-Zawahiri, are thought to have visited camps in Bosnia during the war. The volunteer mujahideen from all over the world flocked there, including France, Indonesia, Iraq, Malaysia, Morocco, Russia, Saudi Arabia, Spain, Thailand, the United Kingdom, the United States, and Yemen.

=== Italy ===
In May 2009 two French nationals were detained by Italian police due to suspected immigration offences; however, they are now suspected of being key al-Qaeda figures. It is thought that they had planned to attack Charles de Gaulle Airport in Paris. Italian police stated that they are "two leading men for the communication of al-Qaeda in Europe".

In 2012, a pentito of the Camorra stated that, the criminal organisation was in contact with members of al-Qaeda and aware of incoming terrorist attacks. The organisation was informed that "something involving airplanes would have happened" and that Al-Qaeda was planning a train bombing in Spain.

In 2015, the Vatican was listed as a possible target for an attack by people associated with al-Qaeda.

=== Kosovo War ===
Islamist elements in the Kosovo Liberation Army during the Kosovo War from Western Europe of ethnic Albanian, Turkish, and North African origin, were organised by Islamic leaders in Western Europe allied to bin Laden and al-Zawahiri.

SHISH's head Fatos Klosi had said that bin Laden was running a terror network in Albania to take part in the war under the disguise of a humanitarian organisation reportedly started in 1994. Claude Kader who was a member testified its existence during his trial. In 2001, the official Belgrade news agency, Tanjug, reported that bin Laden had come from Albania to use his armed forces of 500 Islamic militants in Kosovo around Korce and Pogradec to "commit terrorist acts."

=== Spain ===
The 11 March 2004 train bombings in Madrid killed 191 people and wounded more than 2,000. The terror cell had links to Al-Qaeda and the affiliated Moroccan Islamic Combatant Group (GICM). It was the violent start of the new al-Qaeda. The new Islamic terrorist organization was already made up of jihadist organisations dependent on bin Laden, who made their own decisions. It was the worst Islamist attack in European history. On 2 August 2012 three members of al-Qaeda were arrested in Ciudad Real and Cádiz, suspected of planning attacks in Spain and other European countries. There was an intended attempt at a mall in Cádiz with aircraft loaded with explosives. At the time of the arrest of one of the jihadists who opposed a "huge resistance, using their military training" were eliminated by the police.

== Western Europe ==
A Europe-wide terror plot against the 1998 FIFA World Cup had the backing of bin Laden and al-Qaeda. Preparations for an act of terrorism against the World Cup were completed by European law enforcement agencies between March and May 1998. More than 100 people had been arrested in seven countries as a result of the investigation.

In December 2000, the "Frankfurt Group", an al-Qaeda cell consisting of more than ten terrorists from Germany, France and the United Kingdom led by bin Laden deputy Mohammed Bensakhria was rounded up by law enforcement. The group had planned to bomb the Strasbourg Cathedral on New Year's Eve.

=== France ===
In October 2009, an Algerian physicist working for CERN was arrested due to his links with al-Qaeda. Officials said he had been in contact with people linked to al-Qaeda in the Islamic Maghreb and planned attacks. He later admitted to corresponding with al-Qaeda members located in North Africa over the Internet.

In January 2015, al-Qaeda in the Arabian Peninsula was responsible for coordinated attacks in Paris, including the Charlie Hebdo shooting, killing several people.

=== Germany ===
In September 2009, security measures were heightened in response to a direct threat against Germany, through an al-Qaeda video, the threat came about due to German participation in the War in Afghanistan. Bin Laden stated:

It is shameful to be part of an alliance whose leader does not care about spilling the blood of human beings by bombing villages intentionally. If you had seen [the mass killings] of your American allies and their helpers in northern Afghanistan ... then you would understand the bloody events in Madrid and London,

== See also ==
- Al-Qaeda involvement in Africa
- Al-Qaeda involvement in the Middle East
- Islamic terrorism in Europe
