= Jonathan Randal =

American journalist

Jonathan C. Randal was a foreign correspondent for numerous publications, including The New York Times and The Washington Post (from 1969 to 1998). His work as a reporter primarily focused on war zones, including reporting from Vietnam, Eritrea, Iran, and Lebanon Randal is also the author of four books which variously chronicle and apply his journalism to Middle East issues.

== Career ==
Born in 1933 in Buffalo, New York, Randal was educated at Exeter and Harvard University. He spent his junior year abroad in France and served briefly as a private in the U.S. Army in Europe. Randal began as a foreign correspondent in Paris during the mid-1950s. Though Randal served as a European economic correspondent in Paris, France, he moved on to covering wars He worked for the United Press, the former Paris Herald, Time, The New York Times, and the Washington Post (with which he remained for almost 30 years). He reported on the Algerian War of Independence from France, and the wars and crises in Vietnam, the Congo, Iran, Lebanon, Kurdistan, Bosnia, and Liberia during his time as a war correspondent

Of his decision to become a foreign correspondent, Randal has said: "Essentially I operated as a contrarian in semi-perpetual adversity characterized by an often perverse refusal to do the sensible and obvious and somehow surviving by sheer good luck what others considered sheer folly…With today’s instant communications and concomitant control, it is hard to capture the sense of freedom I enjoyed working abroad, especially in then-remote lands, many untrodden by previous generations of American correspondents."

Randal was called to testify for the International Criminal Tribunal for the former Yugoslavia in 2002. The case was regarding an interview Randal had conducted with former Bosnian-Serbian housing minister Radoslav Brdjanin in 1993. Randal, however, declined to honor the subpoena and eventually won the case on the basis of an appeal – thereby creating a precedent of (limited) immunity from involuntary testimony for war correspondents. While the Washington Post allegedly paid “in excess of $100,000” to defend Randal, the case is also considered a victory for the freedom of the press.

The rationale behind the Washington Post’s defense (and Randal’s subpoena refusal) was simple: if the Red Cross or International Criminal Tribunal could force war correspondents to testify it “would limit coverage and endanger lives. Bluntly put, a warlord could refuse to meet war correspondents, lie to them or indeed kill them rather than risk prosecution for war crimes on the basis of a war correspondent’s work.

In 2013, Randal won John Peter and Anna Catherine Zenger Award from the University of Arizona, School of Journalism. "Given by the School of Journalism since 1954, the award honors journalists who fight for freedom of the press and the people’s right to know." Randal currently lives in Florida.

== Publications ==
- Going All the Way: Christian Warlords, Israeli Adventurers and the War in Lebanon (1989) at Amazon
- After Such Knowledge, What Forgiveness? My Encounters with Kurdistan (1997) at Amazon
- Osama: The Making of a Terrorist (2004) at Random House
- The Tragedy of Lebanon: Christian Warlords, Israeli Adventures, and American Bunglers (2012) at Just World Books
