= Pizza delivery =

Service in which a pizzeria delivers pizza to a customer

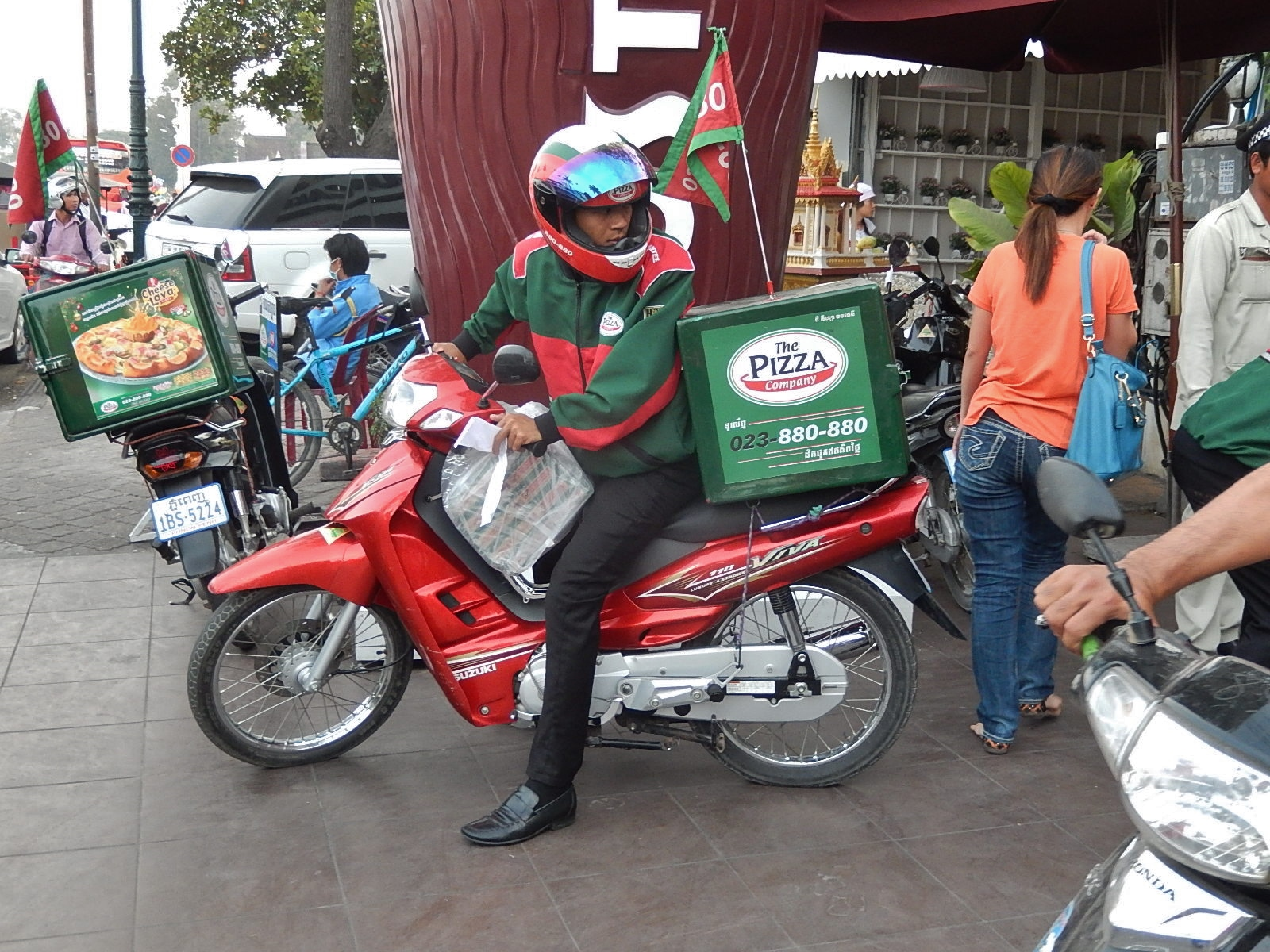
A pizza delivery rider on a scooter used in Phnom Penh, Cambodia

Pizza delivery is a food delivery service in which a pizzeria or pizza chain delivers a pizza to a customer. An order is typically made either by telephone or over the internet, in which the customer can request pizza type and size, and other items to be delivered with it, commonly including soft drinks. Pizzas may be delivered in cardboard pizza boxes or delivery bags, and deliveries are made with either an automobile, scooter or bicycle. Customers can, depending on the provider, choose to pay online, or in person, with cash, credit card, debit card or other means. A delivery fee is sometimes charged, although free delivery is also common.

== Ordering ==
Ordering pizza for delivery usually involves contacting a local pizza restaurant or chain by telephone or online. Online ordering is available in many countries, where some pizza chains offer online menus and ordering.

The pizza delivery industry has kept pace with technological developments since the 1980s beginning with the rise of the personal computer. Specialized computer software for the pizza delivery business helps determine the most efficient routes for carriers, track exact order and delivery times, manage calls and orders with PoS software, and other functions. Since 2008, GPS tracking technology has been used for real-time monitoring of delivery vehicles by customers over the Internet.

Some pizzerias, such as the Ontario-based Canadian chain Pizza Pizza, will incorporate a guarantee to deliver within a predetermined period of time. For example, Domino's had a commercial campaign in the 1980s and early 1990s which guaranteed orders in 30 minutes. This was discontinued in the United States due to concerns about reckless driving by hurried delivery drivers but is still offered in some countries. Pizzerias with no time guarantee will commonly state to the customer an approximate time frame for a delivery, without making any guarantees as to the actual delivery time.

According to Domino's, New Year's Eve is the most popular day for its pizza deliveries; others are Super Bowl Sunday, Halloween, New Year's Day, and the day before Thanksgiving. Unscheduled events may also cause an increase in pizza deliveries; for example, Domino's stated that its sales during the O. J. Simpson slow-speed chase were as large as on Super Bowl Sunday.

== Charge ==
For decades, "free delivery" was a popular slogan for almost all pizza stores. In Australia, a portion of the delivery charge is given to the driver as the store is required to reimburse the driver for the use of a personal vehicle.

Domino's Pizza is credited with popularizing free pizza delivery in the United States. Pizza Hut began experimenting in 1999 with a 50-cent delivery charge in ten stores in the Dallas-Fort Worth area. By mid-2001 it was implemented in 95% of its 1,749 company-owned restaurants in the U.S., and in a smaller number of its 5,250 franchisee-owned restaurants. By 2002, a small percentage of stores owned or franchised by U.S. pizza companies Domino's and Papa John's were also charging delivery fees of 50 cents to $1.50, and some of Little Caesars franchisees charged delivery fees. In 2005, Papa John's implemented delivery charges in the majority of its company-owned stores.

In some countries, it is common to give the pizza deliverer an optional tip upon paying for the order. In Canada and the United States, tipping for pizza delivery is customary. Opinions on appropriate amounts vary widely. Employees are legally obligated to report tips to their employer for income tax purposes, while independent contractors, who may charge a per-delivery fee to a restaurant, are legally obligated to report tips to the Internal Revenue Service.

== Delivery technology ==
=== Delivery bag ===
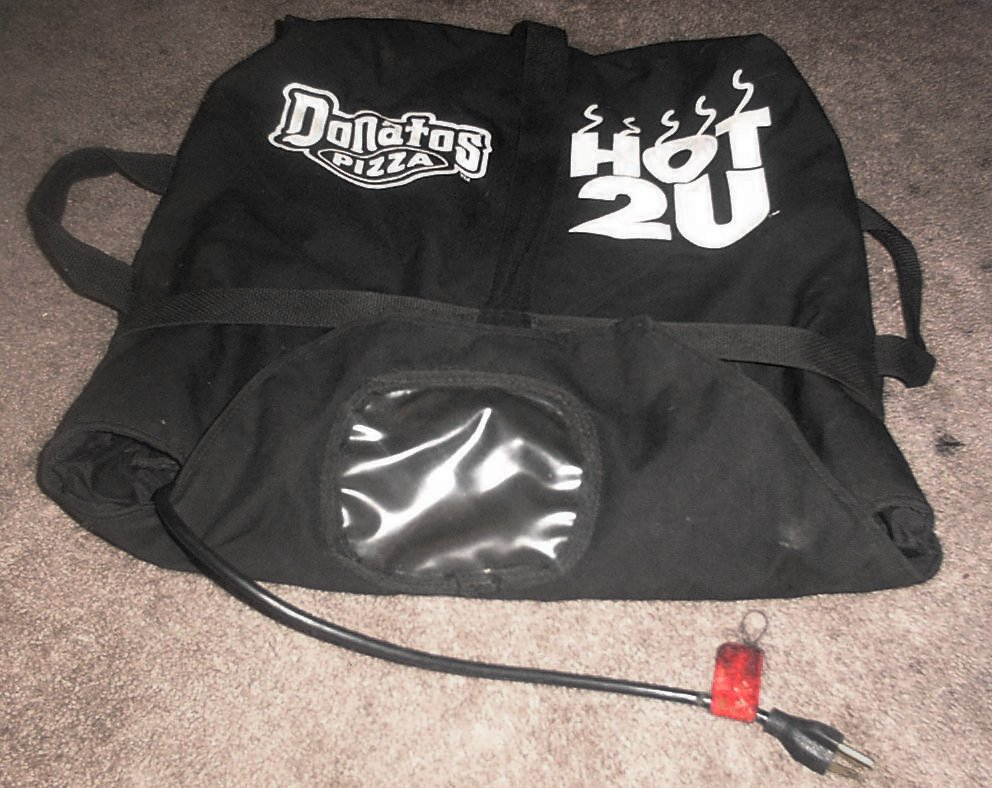
An electrically heated pizza bag, plug at the bottom

Bags used to keep pizza hot while being transported are commonly referred to as hotbags or hot bags. Hotbags are thermal bags, typically made of vinyl, nylon or Cordura, that passively retain heat. Material choice affects cost, durability, and condensation. Heated bags supply added heat through insertion of externally heated disks, electrical heating elements or pellets heated by induction from electrically generated magnetic waves.

=== Pizza box ===
Modern pizza boxes are made of corrugated fiberboard. Corrugated board has a number of advantages for pizza delivery: it is cheap, recyclable, and disposable, it is stiff yet light, it is absorbent thus keeping oil and juice from leaking, and the channels of air in the cardboard have excellent insulation properties.

The history of the pizza box began in Naples during the 1800s, where bakers put pizzas into metal containers called "stufas": round, vented tin or copper containers with shelves that held the pizzas apart from one another. Since the 1940s pizza take-out was done with the pizza sitting on a round cardboard base and covered with a paper bag. It is believed Domino's developed the modern corrugated flat square pizza box in the early 1960s, but they never patented it. Patent designs for pizza boxes date to at least 1968. Innovations since have included various venting configurations, built-in holders for extra sauces, designs for easier recycling, and perforated tops so wedge-shaped pieces of cardboard can be used as plates. The lid of the box is often supported by a disposable plastic tripod on top of the pizza known as a pizza saver.

Pizza boxes have a large amount of corrugated fiberboard, individually and in total volume produced each year, but they are not accepted by some municipal recycling programs because the cardboard is often soaked with grease, making them unsuitable for some forms of recycling. Boxes may thus be commonly thrown away with household waste into landfills; a more environmentally friendly disposal option that has been proposed is a form of composting for pizza boxes. It is also possible to tear off unstained or unsaturated sections such as the lid and/or sides of the box and recycle those.

=== Pizza saver ===
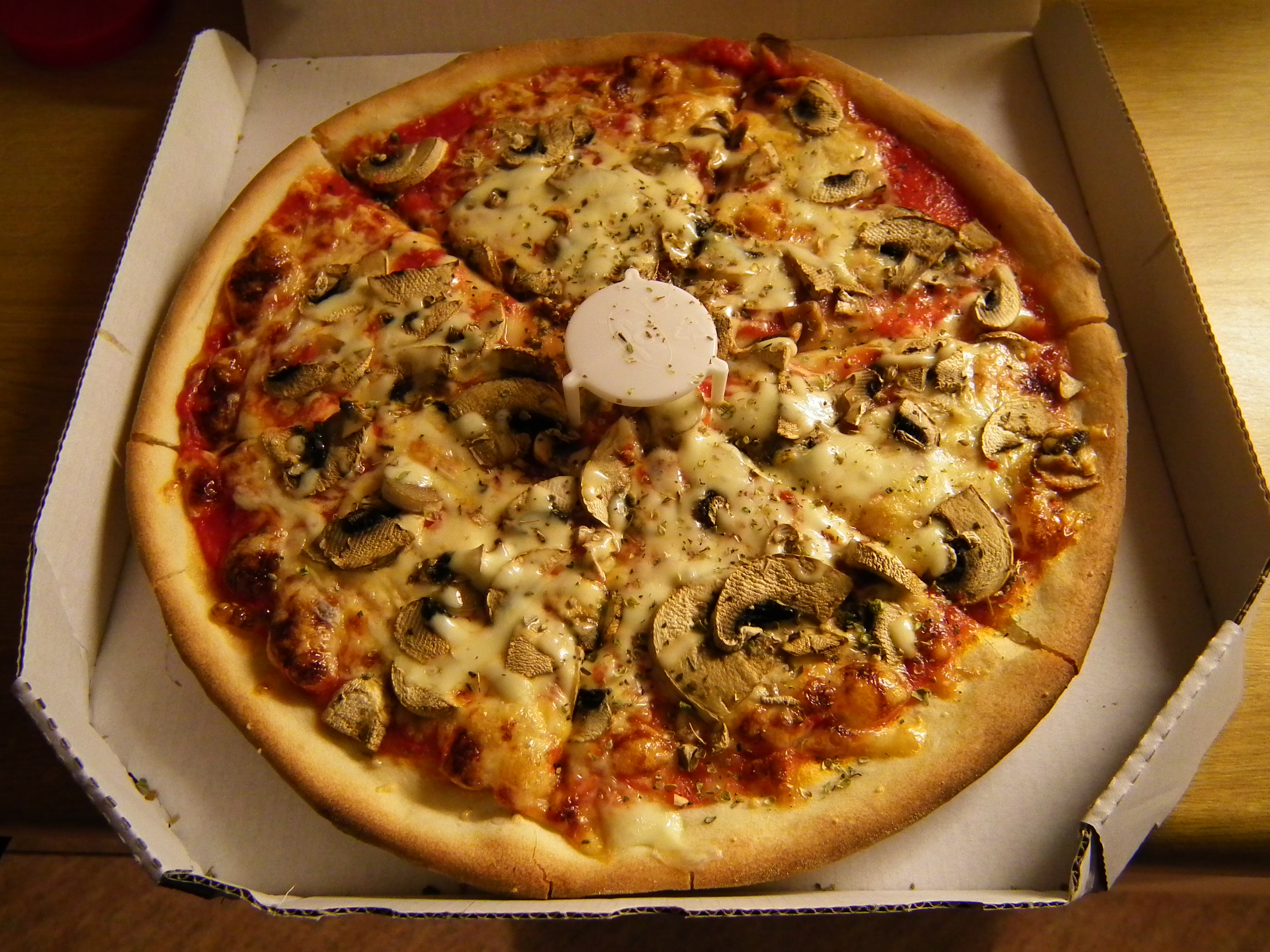
Pizza in a box, with a pizza saver in the middle

In 1974, Claudio Daniel Troglia of Buenos Aires, Argentina, was issued a patent for a plastic three-legged stool that would sit in the middle of the box and keep the top from sagging into pizza, which he called "SEPI" (after "Separador de pizza", "pizza separator" in English), also commonly known as "guardapizza" or "mesita"; however, the patent was not renewed.

In 1985, Carmela Vitale was issued a patent for a plastic 3-legged tripod stool that would sit in the middle of the box and keep the top from sagging into the pizza. Vitale called her device a "package saver" and used that term also as the title of her patent, but it has since been renamed the "pizza saver".

Variations on the device have since been invented, such as a disposable plastic spatula whose handle holds the box top up; and a plastic tripod like that made by Troglia and Vitale, but with one of the legs serrated like a knife, making for easy cutting of stuck cheese and bread.

== Hazards ==
Pizza delivery, by its nature, can pose risks for those engaged in it, as they are required to go to the homes of strangers, in unfamiliar neighborhoods.

In 2004, Pizza Hut fired a delivery driver who shot and killed a robber while on the job, citing its company policy against employees carrying weapons. Other national chains such as Domino's and Papa John's also prohibit carrying weapons, although many independent pizzerias allow delivery persons to carry weapons in a legal manner.

Pizza delivery drivers have been subjected to assault, kidnappings, and robbery, and have sometimes been raped or killed while on the job. Fake orders are sometimes used to lure robbery victims or kidnappings, and delivery people have been injured and killed in robberies and kidnappings.

Pizza delivery workers who have been lured and murdered include Michael Choy and Yafim Weinstein.

== Prank order ==
Pizza places may be subject to prank orders for numerous pizzas or to random houses or a target house. A prank order may cost businesses money and aggravation, resulting in the restaurant throwing away the unpaid pizzas. For example, in November 2010 in Amherst, Massachusetts, a man claiming to be part of Bob Dylan's crew placed an order for 148 pizzas which cost nearly $4,000. Prank callers have been fined in Singapore for placing false orders.

== See also ==
- List of pizza chains
- California Pizza Kitchen
- Godfather's Pizza
- Marco's Pizza
- Mellow Mushroom
- MOD Pizza
- Papa John's
- Papa Murphy's
- Sbarro
- Uno Pizzeria & Grill
