= Eldorado Jones =

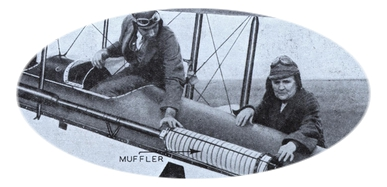
Eldorado Jones with the airplane muffler she invented.

Eldorado Jones (1860 – 1932) Eldorado Jones was an American inventor and businesswoman who pioneered a noise-reduction technology in the area of early aviation. She championed women’s economic independence at a time when it wasn’t common. She was recognized with patenting the first successful exhaust muffler for airplane engines in 1923, noise and efficiency challenges that had long plagued the aviation industry.

== Biography ==
=== Early life and career ===
Jones was born in 1860 in Palmyra, Missouri. Her Family moved to St. Louis, where her father, Alonzo Jones, eventually left them. Despite this factor, she was determined to make her own path, before becoming an inventor she worked as a teacher in Moline, Illinois. She moved to selling insurance for better pay, but for Jones it was her love for tinkering with iron that paved her way to her true talent.

Jones established Eldorado Inventions, Inc., in Moline, Illinois where she exclusively employed women and prohibited men from the premises. This policy came from her personal philosophy in the female self-reliance. This women-only policy enabled opportunities for women during this era where female labor participation was limited. Jones also hired women over the age of 40, which was an even larger demographic that faced discrimination.

=== Airplane muffler technology ===
Jones’ most technically significant invention was an exhaust muffler for airplane engines. According to Modern Mechanics, the device used “a series of small pinwheels which 'chew up' the sound waves and retard the passage of exhaust gases without creating undue back pressure upon the engine”, and was described as the “first successful exhaust engine for airplanes.” She sought to address how early aviation engines were extraordinarily loud, which limited the practical use of them near populated areas and making communication around aircraft nearly impossible. When she tested the muffler she did so at Roosevelt Field in New York, the New York Times reported that her device could have a meaningful influence in future American Aeronautic. She applied for her patent in 1919 and received it in 1923.

=== Later life and death ===
Despite a working patented invention, with a dim view on men it was hard for Jones to capitalize on the muffler. She refused funding from male investors on principle, and no female-led investment networks existed at that time to help fill what was missing. She eventually applied for welfare when funds ran out, and in 1932 a neighbor found her dead in bed. The New York Times ran the headline: “Woman Innovator Dies in Poverty”.

Without the work of Eldorado Jones, we would not have an early prototype of the airplane muffler, a concept that laid the basic work for noise-reduction innovation that the aviation and automotive industries still use today. The principle of using a baffled chamber to reduce the noise of the exhaust is now standard in the industry.

Jones’s final quoted words, in her New York Times obituary, capture her spirit of female empowerment perfectly: "Do not forget to exploit men all you can. Because if you don't, they will exploit you."
