= Murder of Yafim Weinstein =

2009 murder in Israel

Yafim Weinstein
- Died: 2009
- Cause of death: Murder
- Occupation: Cab driver
- Known for: Being murdered in a terrorist attack

Yafim (or Yefim) Weinstein was a 54-year-old Israeli man murdered in 2009.

== Murder ==
Weinstein, a resident of Nazareth Illit, was a cab driver. He was murdered while delivering pizza in a terrorist incident by Islamist militants who identified with Al Qaeda.

== Investigation ==
Eight suspects were arrested in Nazareth in 2010 in a combined operation by the police and the national security services that uncovered a "cell" inspired by Al Qaida and the recorded speeches of Osama bin Laden to illegally acquire arms and launch violent attacks on Jews and Christians.

== Arrests and convictions ==
In 2010, Ahmed Ahmed (21), was arrested for on charges of murder. Ghaleb Ranim (26) and Haider Ziadna (22) were arrested and charged as accomplices to murder. All three were from Nazareth. The three were apprehended as part of a group, or "cell", of 7 men discovered when Ahmed and Ranim traveled to Somalia with the goal of training at an Al-Qaida camp. Ahmed and Ranim had flown Addis Ababa, Ethiopia and then to Kenya, where they were arrested and deported to Israel. When asked at his indictment whether he was motivated by hatred for Christians and Jews, Ahmed responded, "Long live Osama Bin Ladin".

The group was influenced by the imam of Nazareth's Shihab a-Din mosque, Abu Salim, convicted support for the terror organization Al Qaida, and of inciting to violence and terrorism and violence. Raleb Ganaem, Haidar Zidana, and Ali Ahmed Ali were convicted of murder and sentenced to prison; Ali was sentenced to life in jail. Ganaem and another defendant were convicted of abducting and robbing a pizza delivery man in an act "connected to his being Jewish." They ordered a pizza from a pizzeria in Upper Nazareth, waited in ambush for the delivery man and then stabbed, abducted and robbed him. They left him bound and bleeding.
