= William R. Polk =

American academic and foreign policy advisor (1929–2020)

- Born: March 7, 1929; Fort Worth, Texas, U.S.
- Died: April 6, 2020 (aged 91); Vence, France

William Roe Polk (March 7, 1929 – April 6, 2020) was an American foreign policy consultant and author. He was a professor of history at Harvard University and the University of Chicago, and was President of the latter's Adlai Stevenson Institute of International Affairs.

== Early life ==
William Roe Polk was born on March 7, 1929, in Fort Worth, Texas, to George Washington Polk, a lawyer and rancher, and Adelaide Elizabeth (née Roe) Polk, a librarian. He grew up on a ranch in west Texas. He was a relation of president James K. Polk and of the prominent lawyer and diplomat Frank Polk. He attended public school in Fort Worth and the New Mexico Military Institute. He studied in Latin America and worked on a Rome newspaper before matriculating and earning a BA and Ph.D. from Harvard University, and BA and MA from Oxford University. He also studied at the National Autonomous University of Mexico, the Universidad de Chile, the University of Baghdad and the American University of Cairo.

== Career ==
Polk taught Middle Eastern history and politics at Harvard from 1955 to 1961, and was then appointed by President Kennedy to the State Department's Policy Planning Council focusing on the Middle East and North Africa. While there he served as a member of the Cuban Missile Crisis management team.

In 1961 Polk was a Guggenheim Fellow in Near Eastern Studies.

Polk resigned from the federal government to join the University of Chicago as professor of history in 1965, where he taught for ten years and established its Center for Middle Eastern Studies, serving as Founding Director.

In 1967 Polk became president of the Adlai Stevenson Institute of International Affairs, which hosted the 20th Pugwash Conference on nuclear weapons problems, helped organize the “Table Ronde” meeting which laid groundwork for the European Union, and contributed to planning the United Nations Environmental Program. During the 1967 Middle Eastern Six-Day War he returned to Washington to write a draft peace treaty and to serve as an advisor to McGeorge Bundy, who was President Johnson’s personal representative during that crisis.

Polk was Vice Chairman of the W.P. Carey Foundation and a member of the Council on Foreign Relations. He lived and wrote in southern France and was married to Baroness Elisabeth von Oppenheimer. He has lectured at the Canadian Institute of International Relations, the Council on Foreign Relations, the Royal Institute of International Affairs, and the Institute of World Economy and International Affairs of the Soviet (now Russian) Academy of Sciences, as well at over a hundred universities and colleges.

William Polk was also the foreign policy adviser for Democratic candidate Dennis Kucinich's presidential campaign.

== Personal life and death ==
Polk was married to Joan Cooledge from 1950 until their divorce in 1960. He then married Ann Cross in 1962 and they divorced in 1975. Polk then married Baroness Elisabeth von Oppenheimer in 1981.

He had three daughters, a son, and eight grandchildren. Polk died from leukemia on April 6, 2020, in Vence, France, at the age of 91.

== Books ==
- Polk, William R.; Stamler, David M.; Asfour, Edmund (1957). Backdrop to Tragedy: The Struggle for Palestine. Beacon Press. Archived from the original on January 28, 2016 – via Questia.
- The Opening of South Lebanon, 1788-1840: A Study of the Impact of The West on the Middle East (1963). Harvard University Press
- The United States and the Arab World (1965). Harvard University Press, 3rd edition 1975: ISBN 0-674-92718-4
  - The Arab World. 4th edition 1980, hardcover: ISBN 0-674-04316-2, paperback: ISBN 0-674-04317-0
  - The Arab World Today. 5th edition 1991, ISBN 0-674-04319-7
- Beginnings of Modernization in the Middle East: The Nineteenth Century (1968). University of Chicago Press, ISBN 0-226-67425-8
- Passing Brave (1973). Alfred Knopf, ISBN 0-394-47893-2 reprint Panda Press 2013
- The Golden Ode by Labid Ibn Rabiah. Translated with an Introduction and Commentary by William R. Polk (1974). University of Chicago Press, ISBN 0-226-46717-1
- The Elusive Peace: The Middle East in the Twentieth Century (1979). Palgrave Macmillan, ISBN 0-312-24383-9
- Neighbors and Strangers: The Fundamentals of Foreign Affairs (1997). University Of Chicago Press, ISBN 0-226-67329-4
- Polk's Folly: An American Family History (2000). Doubleday, ISBN 0-385-49150-6, Anchor paperback ISBN 0-385-49151-4
- Understanding Iraq: The Whole Sweep of Iraqi History from Genghis Khan's Mongols to the Ottoman Turks to the British Mandate to the American Occupation (2005). HarperCollins hardcover: ISBN 0-06-076468-6, paperback: ISBN 0-06-076469-4
- The Birth of America: From Before Columbus to the Revolution (2006). HarperCollins hardcover: ISBN 0-06-075090-1
- Out of Iraq: A Practical Plan for Withdrawal Now (2006). coauthor George McGovern, Simon & Schuster paperback: ISBN 1-4165-3456-3
- Violent Politics: A History of Insurgency, Terrorism, and Guerrilla War, from the American Revolution to Iraq (2007). HarperCollins hardcover: ISBN 0-06-123619-5
- Understanding Iran: Everything You Need to Know, From Persia to the Islamic Republic, From Cyrus to Ahmadinejad (2009). Palgrave * *Macmillan hardcover: ISBN 978-0-230-61678-3
- Personal History: Living in Interesting Times. William Roe Polk. 2013. ISBN 978-0-9829340-1-2.
- Distant Thunder. William Roe Polk. 2013. ISBN 978-0-9829340-0-5.
- Humpty Dumpty: The Fate of Regime Change. William Roe Polk. 2013. ISBN 978-0-9829340-3-6.
- Blind Man's Buff. William Roe Polk. 2013. ISBN 978-0-9829340-4-3.
- Crusade and Jihad: The Thousand-year War Between the Muslim World and the Global North. Yale University Press. 2018. ISBN 978-0-300-22290-6.
