= Pizza saver =

Object used to prevent the top of a food container from collapsing

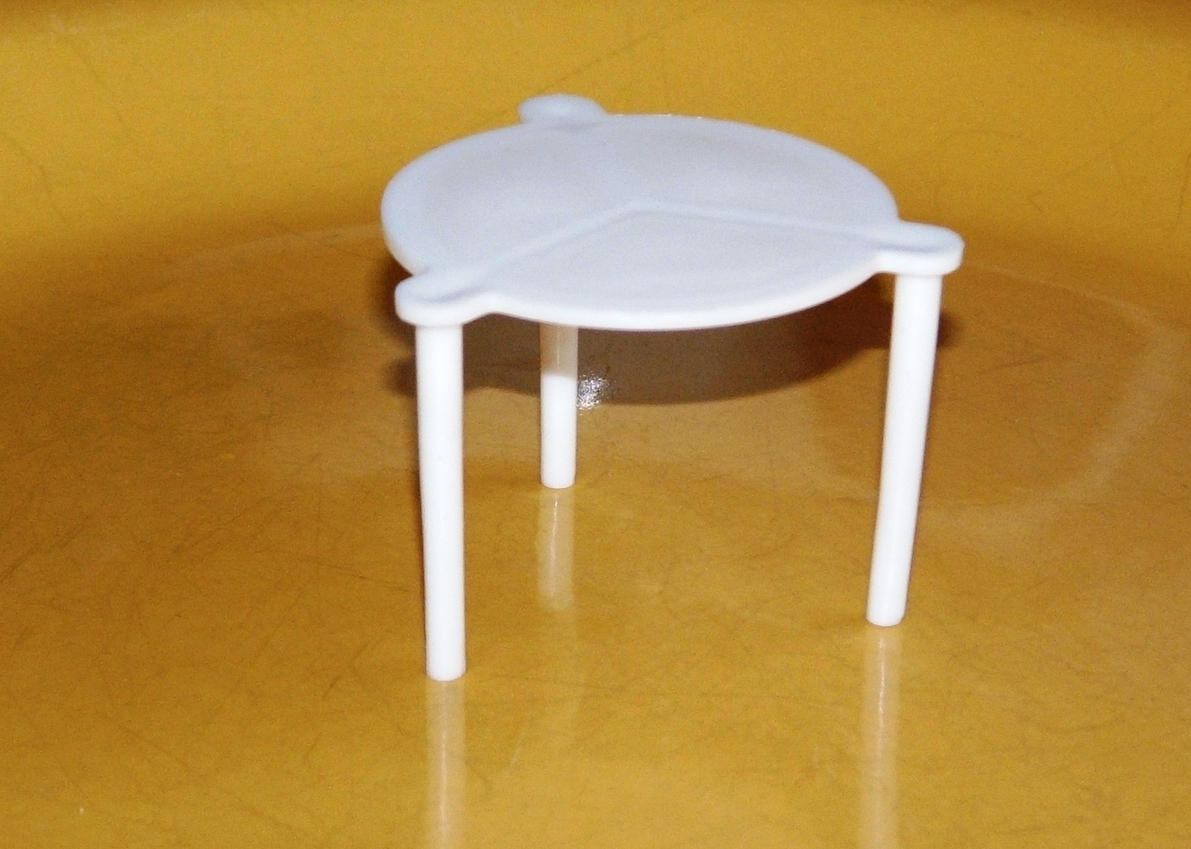
A plastic pizza saver

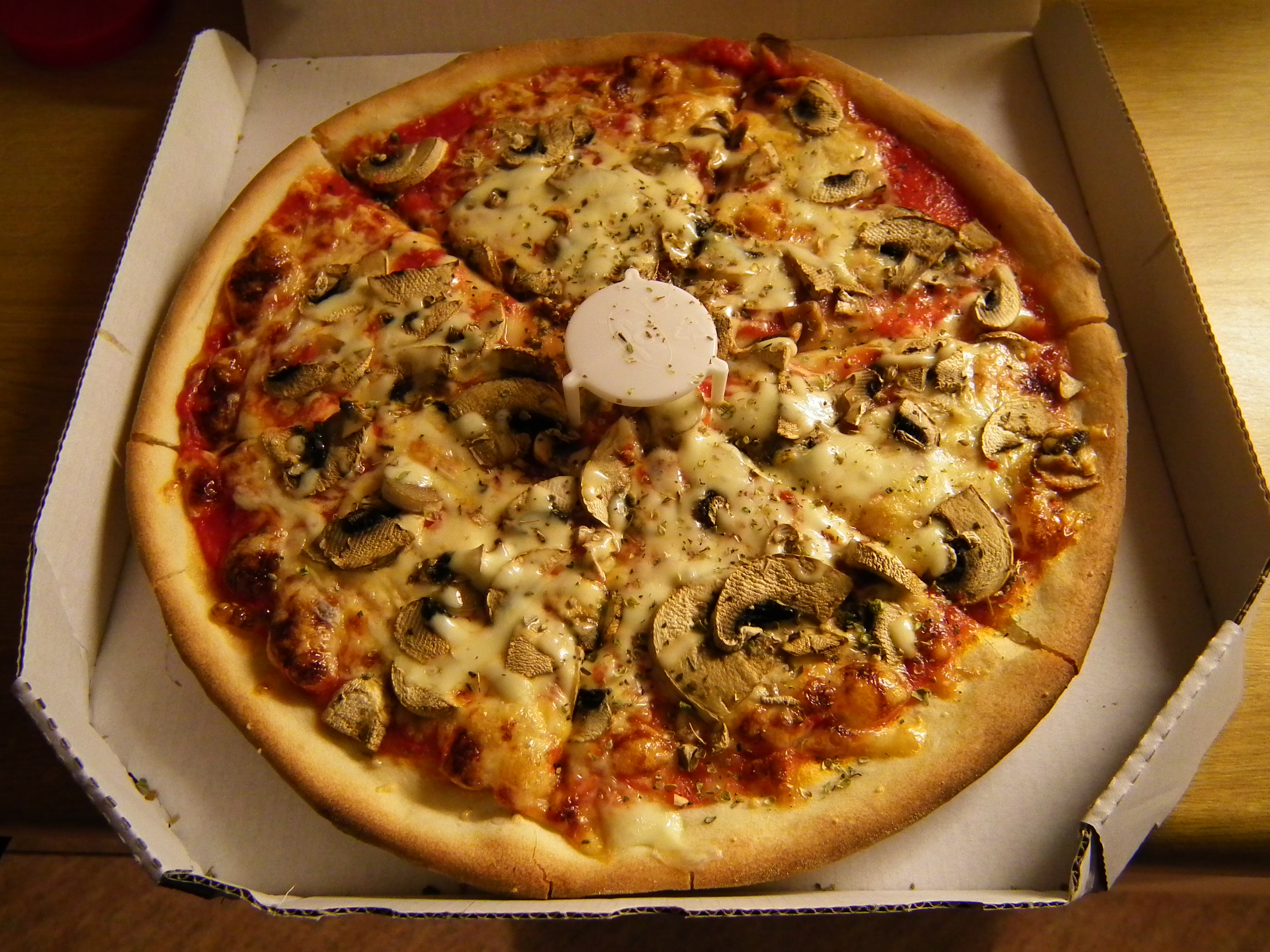
Pizza in a box, with a pizza saver

A pizza saver, sometimes referred to as pizza table or pizza stool, is an object used to prevent the top of a food container, such as a pizza box or cake box, from collapsing in at the center and touching the food inside.

Secondary reasons for the pizza table include keeping the cheese and toppings in place during delivery, so the pizza will be in good condition when it reaches the customer, and enabling customers to pull slices apart without touching them.

== History ==
A pizza saver is made of plastic and has three legs, sometimes four. They are often white, and the common practice is to place one pizza saver in the center of the pizza before the box lid is closed for delivery. The pizza saver is not reused and is typically discarded by the patron, although some people have found secondary uses for them such as egg holders when turned upside down.

In 1974, Claudio Daniel Troglia of Buenos Aires, Argentina, was issued a patent for a plastic three-legged stool that would sit in the middle of the box and keep the top from sagging into pizza, which he called "SEPI" (after "Separador de pizza", "pizza separator" in English), also commonly known as "guardapizza" or "mesita"; however, the patent was not renewed. In 1985, Carmela Vitale of Dix Hills, New York, was issued a patent for a similar device. Vitale called her model a "package saver" and used that term also as the title of her patent, but it has since been renamed the "pizza saver" since that has become its most common use. The patent was filed on February 10, 1983, and issued on February 12, 1985; it lapsed in 1993 for failure to pay maintenance fees.

Variations on the device have since been invented by other people, such as a disposable plastic spatula whose handle holds the box top up and a plastic tripod, like the designs by Vitale and Troglia, but with one of the legs serrated like a knife, making for easy cutting of stuck cheese and bread. Some pizzerias have eliminated the use of plastic pizza savers by returning to the old method of simply baking a bread ball into the center of their pizzas.

Carmela Vitale is praised for her invention of the pizza saver in a 2013 song which appeared in Series 3, Episode 3 of the comedy sketch show, John Finnemore's Souvenir Programme.

== Design ==
As a pizza saver typically consists of a flat surface supported by multiple vertical legs, it is commonly compared to tables, which usually take on a similar form. These devices were sometimes repurposed by children as tables around which appropriately sized dolls or action figures could be seated, such as the popular G.I. Joe action figures of the 1980s.

Given the identity of the device as a "table", in summer 2018, Boston Pizza ran a promotional campaign in Canada that turned the pizza table into a patio set, adding miniature plastic chairs alongside the table. In March 2020, Pizza Hut Hong Kong and furniture retailer IKEA entered a joint venture with the creation of a new side table called a SÄVA, which was designed to resemble a pizza saver. The table would be boxed in packaging resembling a pizza box, and the building instructions included a suggestion to order a Swedish meatball pizza from Pizza Hut, which would contain the same meatballs served in IKEA restaurants.
