= Pedal bin =

Container with a lid operated by a foot pedal

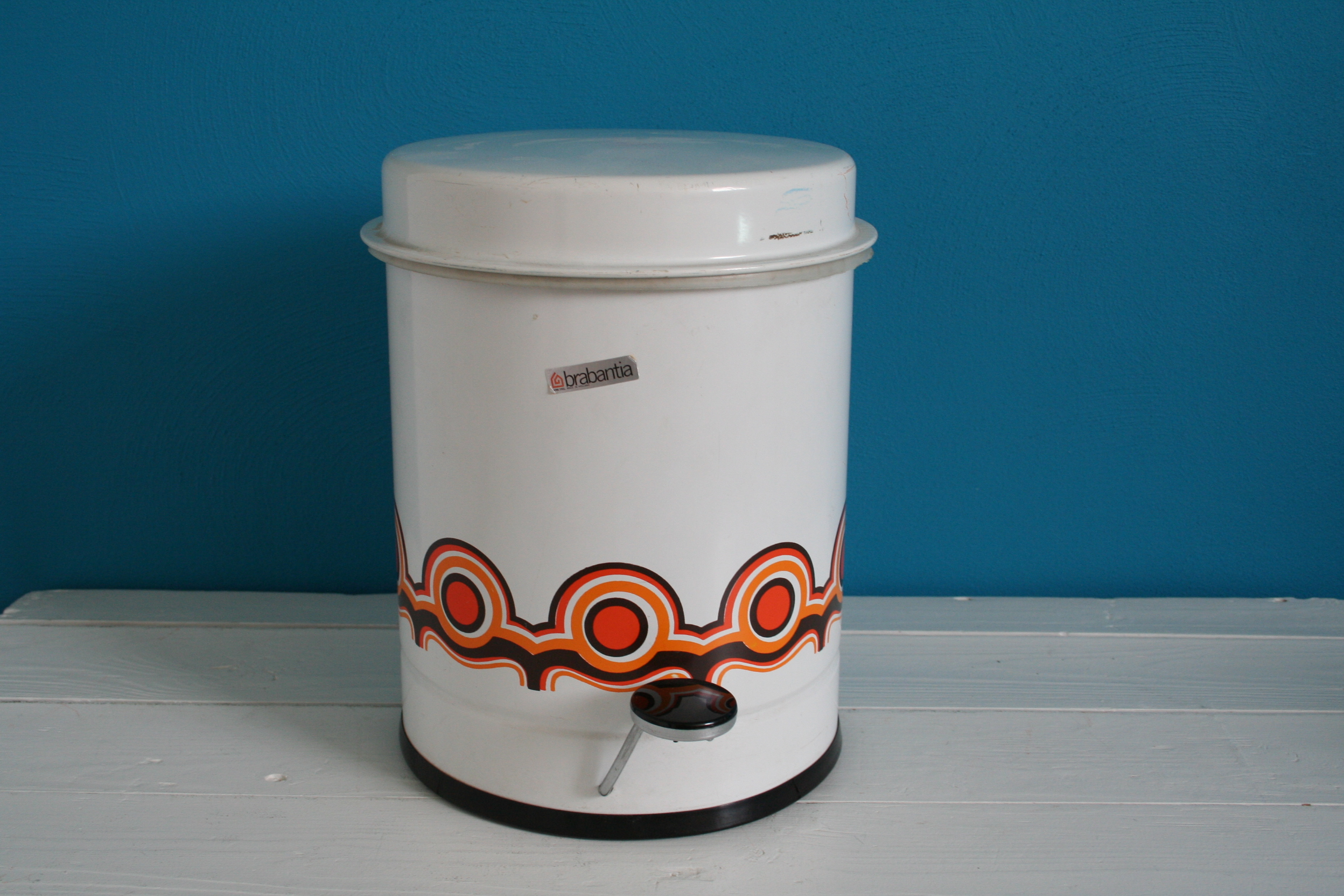
A pedal bin of 1972

Video of pedal bin showing operation

A pedal bin is a container with a lid operated by a foot pedal. Lillian Moller Gilbreth (an industrial engineer and efficiency expert as well as mother of twelve) invented the pedal bin in the 1920s for the disposal of kitchen waste. The foot pedal enables the user to open the lid without touching it with their hands.
