= Ann Moore (inventor) =

Ann Moore was an American nurse who was known for inventing the baby sling called the Snugli and the refined version of it called the Weego.

== Early life and education ==
Ann Moore was born in Ohio in 1934, (Note: Some sources state birth year of 1934 and others 1940. However, an ancestry.com 1950 census entry and college graduation year of 1956 suggest 1934 is correct.) growing up in a farming community known as the Dunkard Brethren Church. The community was similar to the Amish in their morals by living simply, dressing plainly and not using modern devices. Her parents Lucy and Willard Aukerman credit her inventive spirit to her childhood, when she created simple dolls and toys on the farm at a young age. She said the farm taught her many of the values that later shaped her nursing career including the importance of community and making the most of limited resources.

Moore graduated high school in 1952, earned a B.S. in nursing and health from University of Cincinnati in 1956, and then attended Columbia University for her pediatric nursing degree. Her first international experience came when she traveled to Germany to work with Eastern European refugees, followed by a trip to Morocco to aid earthquake victims.

== Career ==
In 1962, Moore was teaching pediatric nursing at Columbia University’s Babies Hospital. Chief residents at the hospital were organizing their first Peace Corps trip to Togo, Africa and she was recruited to join as a pediatric nurse. While training at Howard University in Washington, D.C., she met fellow volunteer Mike Moore, her French training teacher. They got engaged after six weeks of meeting and married two weeks later. They both moved to Togo with the Peace Corps for the next two years where she would teach nutrition courses and worked with the medical team, researching preventive medicine and hygiene. In Togo, Moore would often go to the crowded marketplaces, noticing that she would never hear babies crying. She then realized that infants were being held in slings allowing them to be closer to their mothers. This set-up also allowed for drastically increased mobility for the mothers, being able to cook, run errands, work, and take care of older children.

After her daughter was born in 1964, the Moore's strapped her to their back similar to how they saw African mothers do so. However, she saw that her daughter would slip at times, so she asked her mother, Lucy Auckerman, to sew her an improved carrier. When Moore was out doing errands, people would often come up to her commenting on the sling and asking her questions. At this time, it was a radical idea to hold your children in such a way, however experts were coming out talking about the benefits of this act, and the benefits of bonding with kids. Studies showed that infants who were held close to their mothers developed better language skills and were more self-confident, while Moore thought that the children would grow up to feel secure and loved.

== Invention of the Snugli ==
After seeing the popularity of her sling, Moore created the Snugli, an on the go backpack that allowed parents to carry their young children while being able to have use of their arms. However Moore did not advertise the sling, relying strictly on word of mouth. This turned out to be no problem, becoming a phenomenon in the United States. A Columbia University study showed that children in Snuglis exhibited longer eye-contact, better language skills, and more emotional security. Her invention was created at an almost perfect time, where breast feeding and natural childbirth were becoming popular. She also made some refinements to the sling, adding tucks and darts, leg holes, adjustable straps, and padding. Moore earned a patent for her invention in 1969. Snugli's were sewn by her mother, eventually hiring dozens of women on the farms to keep up with orders. In 1985 Moore and her Husband sold the rights of her product to Gerry Baby Products Company (eventually bought by Evenflo). At this time Moore helped more than 1.5 million infants with her innovation. However, the company marketed the Snugli in a different direction, cheapening it for mass manufacturing. They took out key aspects of the original design, something that Moore did not expect. After 12 years of being asked where to find an original Snugli, Moore decided to create a new version called the Weego. This new design featured adjustable shoulder straps, a washable bib, an inner and outer pouch, and snaps. Adjustable webbing was also added instead of tucks and darts, after seeing that they were out of date. Moore introduced this version in 1999 after the arrival of her grandchildren.

== Creation of Air Lift ==
After selling her first invention, Moore was approached by a respiratory therapist that could aid her patients in carrying their oxygen tanks. Moore and her husband Mike founded Air Lift, a company that creates soft-sided carriers for oxygen canisters and high-tech instruments. Similar to her product for parents, Air Lift allowed those who are dependent on supplemental oxygen to be able to participate in daily activities and become more active. These backpacks featured mesh and air holes to safely carry the cylinders, which contain a highly flammable liquid. She also had begun to work with Hewlett Packard's microwave division, creating a speedometer case that they could carry on their backs. People who are using the bag are being parachuted into rough terrain and climb up microwave towers, meaning it is crucial for the backpack to be durable and protective.

== Impact on society ==
Moore's design has received the honor of permanent placement in the Smithsonian Institution and was also recognized by the Wall Street Journal as one of the most significant inventions of the 20th century.
