= Al-Qaeda =

Pan-Islamist militant organization

al-Qaeda
- جماعة قاعدة الجهاد
- Main flag
- Founder: Osama bin Laden X
- Leaders: Osama bin Laden X (1988–2011); Ayman al-Zawahiri X (2011–2022); Saif al-Adel (de facto; 2022–present)
- Dates active: August 11, 1988 – present
- Allegiance: Islamic Emirate of Afghanistan
- Group: Groups: JNIM; (Islamic State) AQAP; AQIM; Al-Shabaab; AQIS; Ansaru; Ajnad Bayt Al-Maqdis Former groups: AQBH (until 2002); Abu Hafs al-Masri Brigades (until 2005); AQI (2004–2006); (Islamic State) AQY (until 2009); AQBH (until 2009); AQKB (until 2010); Tawhid al-Jihad (Gaza Strip) (until 2012); (Islamic State) Abdullah Azzam Brigades (until 2015); (Islamic State) Ansar al-Sharia (Mali) (until 2016); Ansar al-Sharia (Libya) (until 2017); Al-Nusra Front (2012–2017); Khorasan (until 2017); Ansar al-Sharia (Derna, Libya) (until 2018); AQSP (until 2018); (Islamic State) Ansar al-Sharia (Egypt) (until 2018); (Islamic State) Ansar al-Sharia (Mauritania) (until 2019); (Islamic State) Imam Shamil Battalion (until 2019); (Islamic State) Ansar al-Sharia (Tunisia) (until 2022); (Islamic State) AQMA (until 2024); Hurras al-Din (until 2025)
- Ideology: Sunni Islamism; Pan-Islamism; Qutbism; Muslim unity; Jihadism; Sunni–Shia alliance; Islamic fundamentalism; Anti-Western sentiment; Anti-Americanism; Anti-Russian sentiment; Anti-imperialism; Antisemitism; Anti-Zionism; Anti-Hindu sentiment; Anti-Sufism; Factions: Ahl-i Hadith; Deobandism; Deobandi jihadism; Salafi jihadism; Takfirism; Wahhabism; Anti-Turkish sentiment; Anti-Shi'ism (denied)
- Size: In Afghanistan: 400 (2023); In the Maghreb: 1,000–5,000 (2015); In Yemen: 3,000 (2022); In Somalia: 7,000–12,000 (2023)
- Wars: War on terror; Afghan conflict; War in North-West Pakistan; Somali Civil War; Insurgency in the Maghreb; Iraq War; Iraqi insurgency; Yemeni civil war; Syrian civil war; other conflicts
- Website: https://al-sahab.co/

Al-Qaeda (Note: /ælˈkaɪ(ə)də/; Arabic: الْقَاعِدَة, romanized: al-Qāʿidah, lit. 'the Foundation', IPA: [alˈqaː.ʕi.da]) is a transnational pan-Islamist militant organization led by Sunni Islamist jihadists who self-identify as a vanguard spearheading a global Islamist revolution to unite the Muslim world under a supra-national Islamic caliphate. Its core membership is primarily composed of Arabs, with additional representation from other ethnic groups. Al-Qaeda has mounted attacks on civilian and military targets of the U.S. and its allies; such as the 1998 U.S. embassy bombings, the USS Cole bombing, and the September 11 attacks. It has been designated a terrorist organization by the United Nations and over two dozen countries around the world.

The organization was founded in a series of meetings held in Peshawar, Pakistan during 1988, attended by Abdullah Yusuf Azzam, Osama bin Laden, Mohammed Atef, Ayman Al-Zawahiri and other veterans of the Soviet–Afghan War. Building upon the networks of Maktab Al-Khidamat, the founding members decided to create the organization to serve as a "vanguard" for jihad. When Iraqi forces invaded and occupied Kuwait in 1990, bin Laden offered to support Saudi Arabia by sending his mujahideen fighters. His offer was rebuffed by the Saudi government, which instead sought the aid of the United States. The stationing of U.S. troops in the Arabian Peninsula prompted bin Laden to declare a jihad against both the rulers of Saudi Arabia – whom he denounced as murtadd (apostates) – and against the US. From 1992, al-Qaeda established its headquarters in Sudan until it was expelled in 1996. It then shifted its base to the Taliban-ruled Afghanistan and later expanded to other parts of the world, primarily in the Middle East and South Asia. In 1996 and 1998, bin Laden issued two fatwās that demanded the withdrawal of U.S. troops from Saudi Arabia.

In 1998, al-Qaeda conducted the US embassy bombings in Kenya and Tanzania, which killed 224 people. The U.S. retaliated by launching Operation Infinite Reach, against al-Qaeda targets in Afghanistan and Sudan. In 2001, al-Qaeda carried out the September 11 attacks, resulting in nearly 3,000 deaths, long-term health consequences of nearby residents, damage to global economic markets, the triggering of drastic geo-political changes as well as generating profound cultural influence across the world. The U.S. launched the war on terror in response and invaded Afghanistan to depose the Taliban and destroy al-Qaeda. In 2003, a U.S.-led coalition invaded Iraq, overthrowing the Ba'athist regime which they falsely accused of having ties with al-Qaeda. In 2004, al-Qaeda launched its Iraqi regional branch. After pursuing him for almost a decade, the U.S. military killed bin Laden in Pakistan in May 2011.

Al-Qaeda members assert that a Judeo-Christian alliance led by the U.S. is waging a war against Islam and conspiring to destroy Islam. Al-Qaeda also opposes man-made laws, and seek to implement sharia law in Muslim countries. Al-Qaeda fighters characteristically deploy tactics such as suicide attacks (Inghimasi and Istishhadi operations) involving simultaneous bombing of several targets in battle-zones. Al-Qaeda's Iraq branch, which later morphed into the Islamic State of Iraq after 2006, was responsible for numerous sectarian attacks against Shias during the Iraqi insurgency. Al-Qaeda ideologues envision the violent removal of all foreign and secularist influences in Muslim countries, which it denounces as corrupt deviations. Following the death of bin Laden in 2011, al-Qaeda vowed to avenge his killing. The group was then led by Egyptian Ayman Al-Zawahiri, until he too was killed by the U.S. in 2022. Zawahiri was de facto replaced by Saif al-Adel, a former micro-manager of al-Qaeda and one of the few surviving founding members. As of 2026, the militant group operates under a decentralized structure, focusing on regional insurgencies rather than global operations.

== Name ==
The English name of the organization is a simplified transliteration of the Arabic noun al-qāʿidah (القاعدة), which means "the foundation" or "the base". The initial al- is the Arabic definite article "the", hence "the base". In Arabic, al-Qaeda has four syllables (/alˈqaː.ʕi.da/). However, since two of the Arabic consonants in the name are not phones found in the English language, the common naturalized English pronunciations include /ælˈkaɪdə/, /ælˈkeɪdə/ and /ˌælkɑːˈiːdə/. Al-Qaeda's name can also be transliterated as al-Qaida, al-Qa'ida, or el-Qaida.

The doctrinal concept of al-Qaeda was first coined by the Palestinian Islamist scholar and jihadist leader Abdullah Azzam in an April 1988 issue of Al-Jihad magazine to describe a religiously committed vanguard of Muslims who wage armed jihad globally to liberate oppressed Muslims from foreign invaders, establish sharia (Islamic law) across the Islamic world by overthrowing the ruling secular governments; and thus restore the past Islamic prowess. This was to be implemented by establishing an Islamic state that would nurture generations of Muslim soldiers that would perpetually attack Americans and the U.S.' allied governments in the Islamic world. Numerous historical models were cited by Azzam as successful examples of his call; starting from the early Muslim conquests of the 7th century to the recent anti-Soviet Afghan mujahideen of the 1980s. According to Azzam's world-view:

It is about time to think about a state that would be a solid base for the distribution of the (Islamic) creed, and a fortress to host the preachers from the hell of the Jahiliyyah [the pre-Islamic period].

Bin Laden explained the origin of the term in 2001:

The name 'al-Qaeda' was established a long time ago by mere chance. The late Abu Ebeida El-Banashiri established the training camps for our mujahedeen against Russia's terrorism. We used to call the training camp al-Qaeda. The name stayed.

It has been argued that two documents seized from the Sarajevo office of the Benevolence International Foundation prove the name was not simply adopted by the mujahideen movement and that a group called al-Qaeda was established in August 1988. Both of these documents contain minutes of meetings held to establish a new military group, and contain the term "al-Qaeda".

Former British Foreign Secretary Robin Cook wrote that the word al-Qaeda should be translated as "the database", because it originally referred to the computer file of the thousands of mujahideen militants who were recruited and trained with CIA help to defeat the Soviets. In April 2002, the group assumed the name Qa'idat Al-Jihad (قاعدة الجهاد qāʿidat al-jihād), which means "the base of Jihad". According to Diaa Rashwan, this was "apparently as a result of the merger of the overseas branch of Egypt's Al-Jihad, which was led by Ayman al-Zawahiri, with the groups bin Laden brought under his control after his return to Afghanistan in the mid-1990s."

== Organization ==
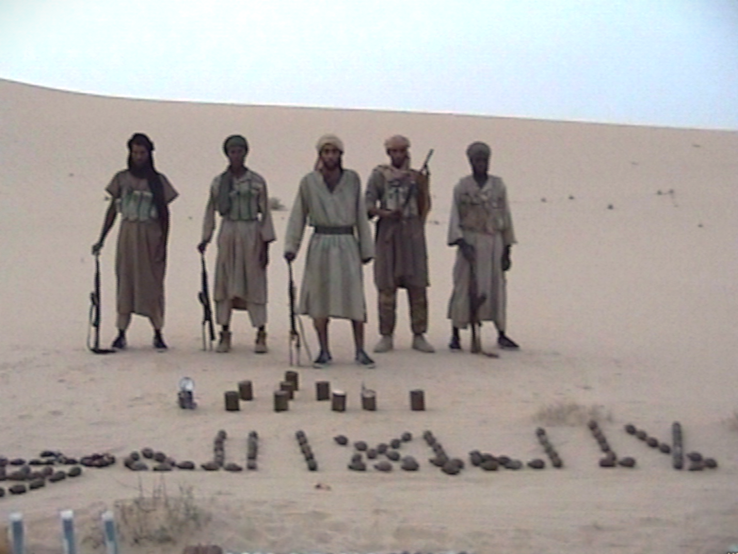
Members of al-Qaeda in the Islamic Maghreb posing with grenades and weapons in Algeria, 2010

Al-Qaeda only indirectly controls its day-to-day operations. Its philosophy calls for the centralization of decision making, while allowing for the decentralization of execution. The top leaders of al-Qaeda have defined the organization's ideology and guiding strategy, and they have also articulated simple and easy-to-receive messages. At the same time, mid-level organizations were given autonomy, but they had to consult with top management before large-scale attacks and assassinations. Top management included the shura council as well as committees on military operations, finance, and information sharing. Through the information committees of al-Qaeda, al-Zawahiri placed special emphasis on communicating with his groups. However, after the war on terror, al-Qaeda's leadership has become isolated. As a result, the leadership has become decentralized, and the organization has become regionalized into several al-Qaeda groups.

The group was initially dominated by Egyptians and Saudis, with some participation from Yemenis and Kuwaitis. Over time, it has evolved into a more international terrorist organization. While its core group originally shared a background in Egypt and the Arabian Peninsula, it has since attracted fighters from other Arab groups, including North Africans, Jordanians, Palestinians, and Iraqis. In the decade following the 9/11 attacks, Muslims from non-Arab backgrounds, such as Pakistanis, Afghans, Turks, Kurds, and Europeans, have also joined the organization.

Many Western analysts do not believe that the global jihadist movement is driven at every level by al-Qaeda's leadership. However, bin Laden held considerable ideological influence over revolutionary Islamist movements across the world. Experts argue that al-Qaeda has fragmented into a number of disparate regional movements, and that these groups bear little connection with one another.

This view mirrors the account given by bin Laden in a 2001 interview:

"this matter isn't about any specific person and ... is not about the al-Qa'idah Organization. We are the children of an Islamic Nation, with Prophet Muhammad as its leader, our Lord is one ... and all the true believers [mu'mineen] are brothers. So the situation isn't like the West portrays it, that there is an 'organization' with a specific name (such as 'al-Qa'idah') and so on. That particular name is very old. It was born without any intention from us. Brother Abu Ubaida ... created a military base to train the young men to fight against the vicious, arrogant, brutal, terrorizing Soviet empire ... So this place was called 'The Base' ['Al-Qa'idah'], as in a training base, so this name grew and became. We aren't separated from this nation. We are the children of a nation, and we are an inseparable part of it, and from those public demonstrations which spread from the far east, from the Philippines to Indonesia, to Malaysia, to India, to Pakistan, reaching Mauritania ... and so we discuss the conscience of this nation."

As of 2010, however, Bruce Hoffman saw al-Qaeda as a cohesive network that was strongly led from the Pakistani tribal areas.

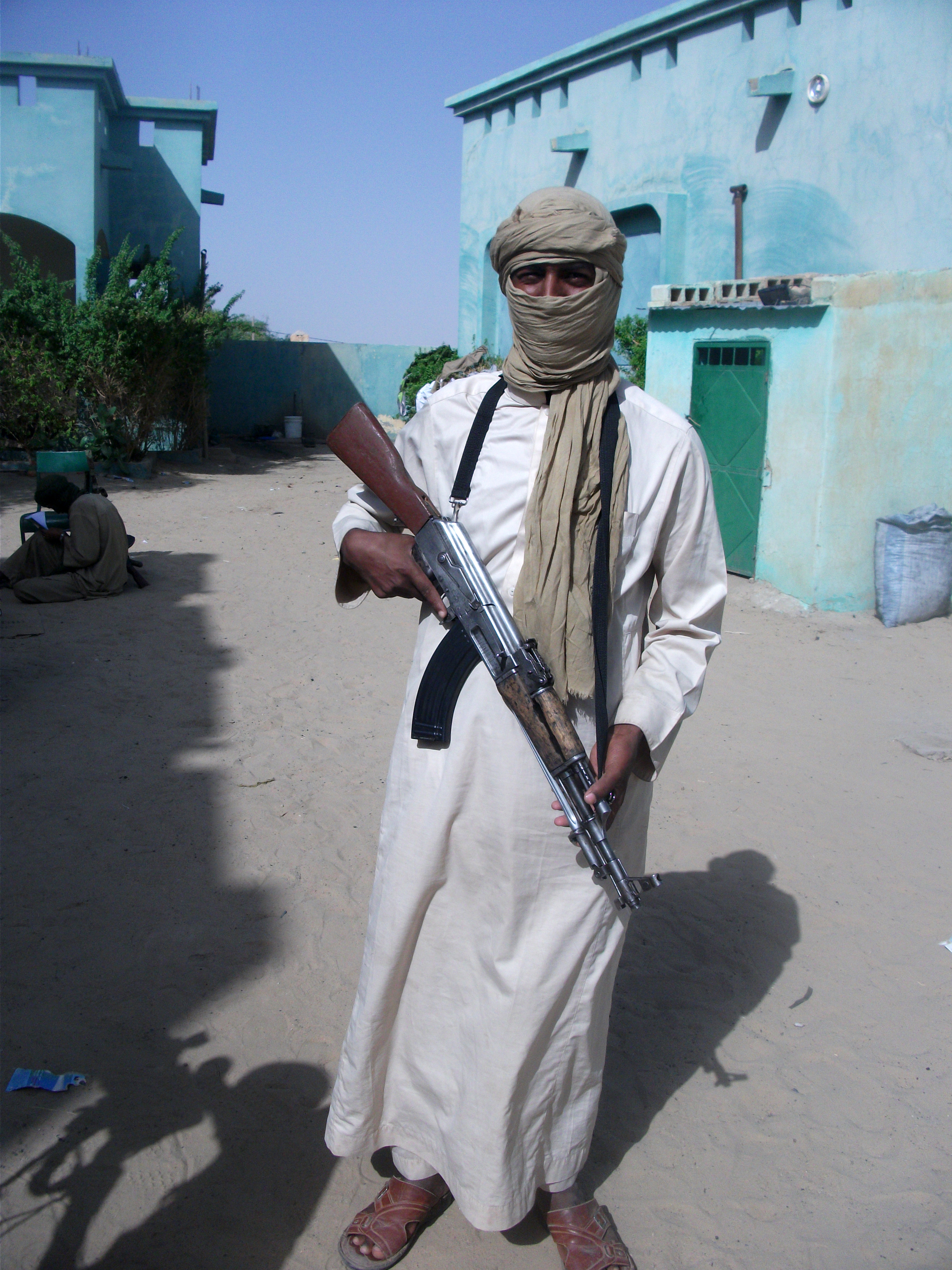
Al-Qaeda militant in Sahel armed with a Type 56 assault rifle, 2012

=== Affiliates ===
Al-Qaeda has the following direct affiliates:

- Al-Qaeda in the Arabian Peninsula (AQAP)
- Al-Qaeda in the Indian subcontinent (AQIS)
- Al-Qaeda in the Islamic Maghreb (AQIM)
- Jama'at Nasr al-Islam wal-Muslimin (JNIM)
- Al-Shabaab

The following are presently believed to be allied with al-Qaeda:

- Fatah al-Islam
- Islamic Jihad Union
- Jaish-e-Mohammed
- Lashkar-e-Taiba

Al-Qaeda's former affiliates or allies include the following:

- Abu Sayyaf (pledged allegiance to ISIL in 2014)
- Caucasus Emirate (inactive by 2016)
- Hurras al-Din (dissolved in 2025)
- Jemaah Islamiyah (dissolved in 2024)
- Islamic Movement of Uzbekistan (main faction joined ISIL)
- Moroccan Islamic Combatant Group (dissolved)
- Al-Mourabitoun (joined JNIM in 2017)
- Al-Qaeda in Iraq (became the Islamic State of Iraq, which later seceded from al-Qaeda and became ISIL)
- Al-Qaeda in the Lands Beyond the Sahel (inactive since 2015)
- Ansar al-Islam (majority merged with ISIL in 2014)
- Ansar Dine (joined JNIM in 2017)
- Islamic Jihad in Yemen (became AQAP)
- Movement for Oneness and Jihad in West Africa (merged with Al-Mulathameen to form Al-Mourabitoun in 2013)
- Rajah Sulaiman Movement (leader arrested in 2024)
- Al-Nusra Front (dissolved in 2016 after breaking ties with al-Qaeda, merged with other Islamist organizations to form Hay'at Tahrir al-Sham, subsequently merged into the Syrian Armed Forces in 2025)

=== Leadership ===
==== Osama bin Laden (1988 – May 2011) ====
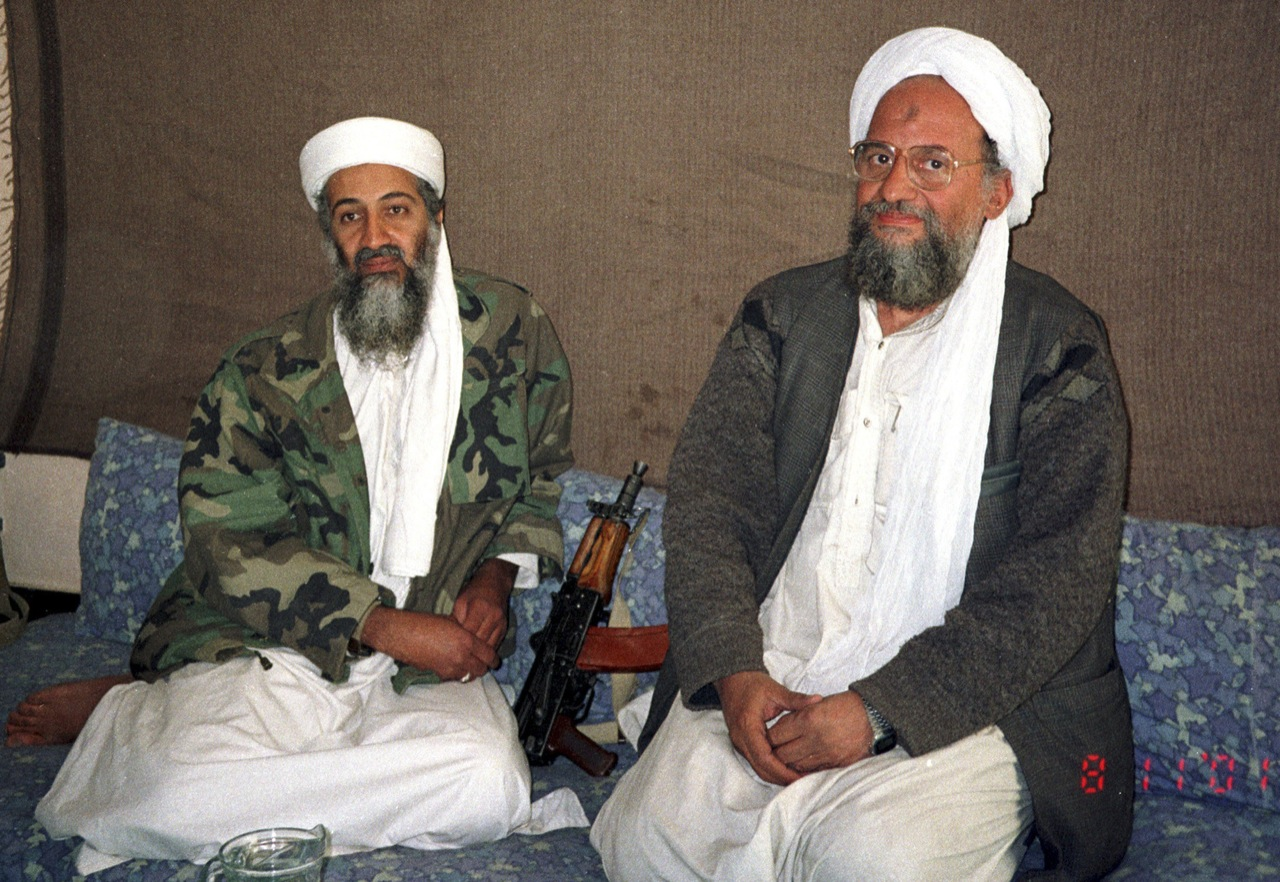
Osama bin Laden (left) and Ayman Al-Zawahiri (right) photographed in 2001

Osama bin Laden served as the emir of al-Qaeda from the organization's founding in 1988 until his assassination by US forces on May 2, 2011. Atiyah Abd Al-Rahman was alleged to be second in command prior to his death on August 22, 2011.

Bin Laden was advised by a Shura Council, which consists of senior al-Qaeda members. The group was estimated to consist of 20–30 people.

==== Ayman al-Zawahiri (May 2011 – July 2022) ====
Ayman al-Zawahiri had been al-Qaeda's deputy emir and assumed the role of emir following bin Laden's death. Al-Zawahiri replaced Saif Al-Adel, who had served as interim commander.

On 4 June 2012, Al-Rahman's alleged successor as his second in command, Abu Yahya Al-Libi, was killed in Pakistan.

Nasir Al-Wuhayshi was alleged to have become al-Qaeda's overall second in command and general manager in 2013. He was concurrently the leader of al-Qaeda in the Arabian Peninsula (AQAP) until he was killed by a US airstrike in Yemen in June 2015. Abu Khayr Al-Masri, Wuhayshi's alleged successor as the deputy to al-Zawahiri, was killed by a U.S. airstrike in Syria in February 2017. Al-Qaeda's next alleged number two leader, Abdullah Ahmed Abdullah, was killed by Israeli agents. His pseudonym was Abu Muhammad Al-Masri, who was killed in November 2020 in Iran. He was involved in the 1998 bombings of the U.S. embassies in Kenya and Tanzania.

Al-Qaeda's network was built from scratch as a conspiratorial network which drew upon the leadership of a number of regional nodes. The organization divided itself into several committees, which include:

- The Military Committee, which is responsible for training operatives, acquiring weapons, and planning attacks.
- The Money/Business Committee, which funds the recruitment and training of operatives through the hawala banking system. US-led efforts to eradicate the sources of "terrorist financing" were most successful in the year immediately following the September 11 attacks. Al-Qaeda continues to operate through unregulated banks, such as the 1,000 or so hawaladars in Pakistan, some of which can handle deals of up to US$10 million. The committee also procures false passports, pays al-Qaeda members, and oversees profit-driven businesses. In the 9/11 Commission Report, it was estimated that al-Qaeda required $30 million per year to conduct its operations.
- The Law Committee reviews Sharia law, and decides upon courses of action conform to it.
- The Islamic Study/Fatwah Committee issues religious edicts, such as an edict in 1998 telling Muslims to kill Americans.
- The Media Committee ran the now-defunct newspaper Nashrat al Akhbar ("Newscast") and handled public relations.
- In 2005, al-Qaeda formed As-Sahab, a media production house, to supply its video and audio materials.

==== Saif Al-Adel (July 2022 – present) ====
Al-Zawahiri was killed on July 31, 2022, in a drone strike in Afghanistan. In 2023, a UN report concluded that de facto leadership of al-Qaeda had passed to Saif Al-Adel, who was operating out of Iran. Adel, a former Egyptian army officer, became a military instructor in al-Qaeda camps in the 1990s and was known for his involvement in the Battle of Mogadishu. The report stated that Al-Adel's leadership could not officially be declared by al-Qaeda because of "political sensitivities" of Afghan government in acknowledging the death of al-Zawahiri as well as due to "theological and operational" challenges posed by the location of Al-Adel in Iran.

=== Command structure ===
Most of al-Qaeda's top leaders and operational directors were veterans who fought against the Soviet invasion of Afghanistan in the 1980s. bin Laden and al-Zawahiri were the leaders who were considered the operational commanders of the organization. Nevertheless, al-Qaeda was not operationally managed by al-Zawahiri. Several operational groups exist, which consult with the leadership in situations where attacks are in preparation. "... al-Zawahiri does not claim to have direct hierarchical control over al Qaeda's vast, networked structure. Al-Qaeda's core leadership seeks to centralize the organization's messaging and strategy rather than to manage the daily operations of its franchises. But formal affiliates are required to consult with al-Qaeda's core leadership before carrying out large-scale attacks." Al-Qaeda central (AQC) is a conglomerate of expert committees, each in supervision of distinct tasks and objectives. Its membership is mostly composed of Egyptian Islamist leaders who participated in the anti-communist Afghan Jihad. Assisting them are hundreds of Islamic field operatives and commanders, based in various regions of the Islamic world. The central leadership assumes control of the doctrinal approach and overall propaganda campaign; while the regional commanders were empowered with independence in military strategy and political maneuvering. This novel hierarchy made it possible for the organisation to launch wide-range offensives.

Nasser Al-Bahri, who was bin Laden's bodyguard for four years in the run-up to 9/11 wrote in his memoir a highly detailed description of how the group functioned at that time. Al-Bahri described al-Qaeda's formal administrative structure and vast arsenal. However, the author Adam Curtis argued that the idea of al-Qaeda as a formal organization is primarily an American invention. Curtis contended the name "al-Qaeda" was first brought to the attention of the public in the 2001 trial of bin Laden and the four men accused of the 1998 US embassy bombings in East Africa. Curtis wrote:

The reality was that bin Laden and Ayman al-Zawahiri had become the focus of a loose association of disillusioned Islamist militants who were attracted by the new strategy. But there was no organization. These were militants who mostly planned their own operations and looked to bin Laden for funding and assistance. He was not their commander. There is also no evidence that bin Laden used the term "al-Qaeda" to refer to the name of a group until after September 11 attacks, when he realized that this was the term the Americans had given it.

During the 2001 trial, the U.S. Department of Justice needed to show that bin Laden was the leader of a criminal organization in order to charge him in absentia under the Racketeer Influenced and Corrupt Organizations Act. The name of the organization and details of its structure were provided in the testimony of Jamal Al-Fadl, who said he was a founding member of the group and a former employee of bin Laden. Questions about the reliability of Al-Fadl's testimony have been raised by a number of sources because of his history of dishonesty, and because he was delivering it as part of a plea bargain agreement after being convicted of conspiring to attack US military establishments. Sam Schmidt, a defense attorney who defended Al-Fadl, said:

There were selective portions of al-Fadl's testimony that I believe was false, to help support the picture that he helped the Americans join together. I think he lied in a number of specific testimony about a unified image of what this organization was. It made al-Qaeda the new Mafia or the new Communists. It made them identifiable as a group and therefore made it easier to prosecute any person associated with al-Qaeda for any acts or statements made by bin Laden.

=== Field operatives ===
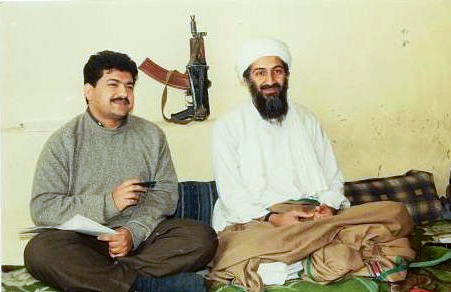
Pakistani journalist Hamid Mir interviewing Osama bin Laden in Afghanistan, 1997

The number of individuals in the group who have undergone proper military training, and are capable of commanding insurgent forces, is largely unknown. Documents captured in the raid on bin Laden's compound in 2011 show that the core al-Qaeda membership in 2002 was 170. In 2006, it was estimated that al-Qaeda had several thousand commanders embedded in 40 countries. As of 2009, it was believed that no more than 200–300 members were still active commanders.

According to the 2004 documentary The Power of Nightmares, al-Qaeda was so weakly linked together that it only consisted of bin Laden and a small clique of close associates. The lack of any significant numbers of convicted al-Qaeda members, despite a large number of arrests on terrorism charges, was cited by the documentary as a reason to doubt whether a widespread entity that met the description of al-Qaeda existed. Al-Qaeda's commanders, as well as its sleeping agents, are hiding in different parts of the world to this day. They are mainly hunted by the American and Israeli secret services.

=== Insurgent forces ===
As of 2006, al-Qaeda maintained two separate forces which are deployed alongside insurgents in Iraq and Pakistan. The first, numbering in the tens of thousands, was "organized, trained, and equipped as insurgent combat forces" in the Soviet–Afghan war. The force was composed primarily of foreign mujahideen from Saudi Arabia and Yemen. Many of these fighters went on to fight in Bosnia and Somalia for global jihad. Another group, which numbered 10,000 in 2006, live in the West and have received rudimentary combat training.

Other analysts have described al-Qaeda's rank and file as being "predominantly Arab" in its first years of operation, but that the organization also includes "other peoples" as of 2007. It has been estimated that 62 percent of al-Qaeda members have a university education. In 2011 and the following year, the Americans successfully settled accounts with bin Laden, Anwar Al-Awlaki, the organization's chief propagandist, and Abu Yahya Al-Libi's deputy commander. The optimistic voices were already saying it was over for al-Qaeda. Nevertheless, it was around this time that the Arab Spring greeted the region, the turmoil of which came great to al-Qaeda's regional forces. Seven years later, al-Zawahiri became arguably the number one leader in the organization, implementing his strategy with systematic consistency. Tens of thousands loyal to al-Qaeda and related organizations were able to challenge local and regional stability and ruthlessly attack their enemies in the Middle East, Africa, South Asia, Southeast Asia, Europe and Russia alike. In fact, from Northwest Africa to South Asia, al-Qaeda had more than two dozen "franchise-based" allies. The number of al-Qaeda militants was set at 20,000 in Syria alone, and they had 4,000 members in Yemen and about 7,000 in Somalia. The war was not over.

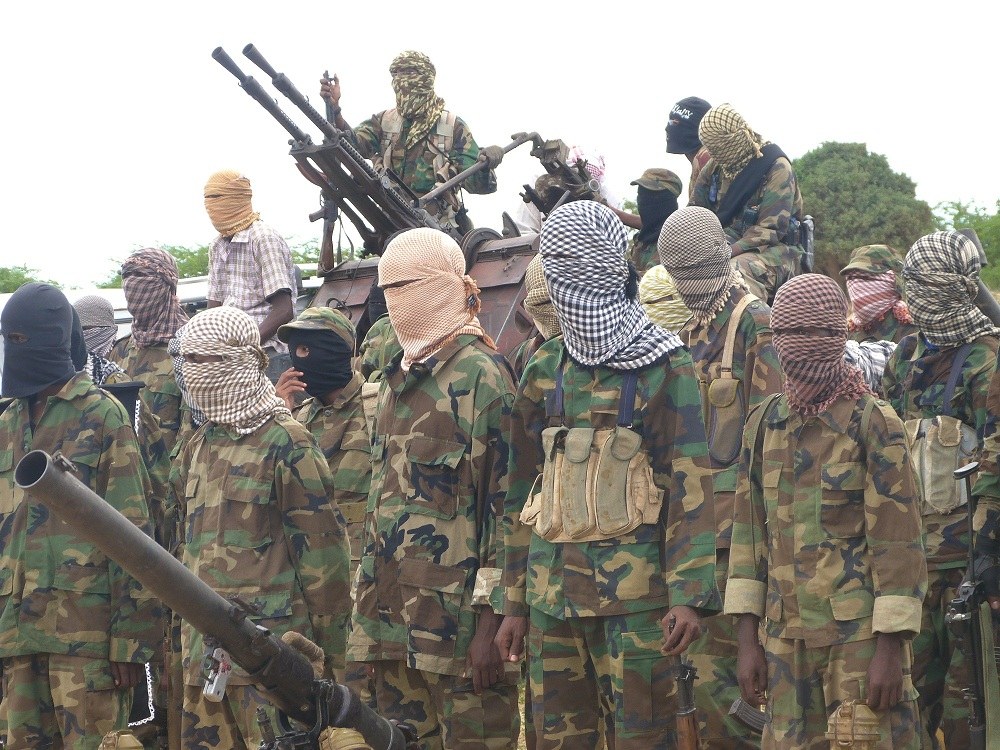
Members of Al-Shabaab, the Al-Qaeda branch in Somalia, in the city of Barawa in 2013.

In 2001, al-Qaeda had around 20 functioning cells and 70,000 insurgents spread over sixty nations. According to latest estimates, the number of active-duty soldiers under its command and allied militias have risen to approximately 250,000 by 2018.

=== Financing ===
Al-Qaeda usually does not disburse funds for attacks, and very rarely makes wire transfers. In the 1990s, financing came partly from the personal wealth of bin Laden. Other sources of income included the heroin trade and donations from supporters in Kuwait, Saudi Arabia, and other Gulf states. A 2009 leaked diplomatic cable stated that "terrorist funding emanating from Saudi Arabia remains a serious concern."

Among the first pieces of evidence regarding Saudi Arabia's support for al-Qaeda was the "Golden Chain", a handwritten list of early al-Qaeda funders seized during a 2002 raid in Sarajevo by Bosnian police. The list was validated by al-Qaeda defector Jamal Al-Fadl, and included the names of both donors and beneficiaries. Bin Laden's name appeared seven times among the beneficiaries, while 20 Saudi and Gulf-based businessmen and politicians were listed among the donors. Notable donors included Adel Batterjee, and Wael Hamza Julaidan. Batterjee was designated as a terror financier by the U.S. Department of the Treasury in 2004, and Julaidan is recognized as one of al-Qaeda's founders.

Documents seized during the 2002 Bosnia raid showed that al-Qaeda widely exploited charities to channel financial and material support to its operatives across the globe. Notably, this activity exploited the International Islamic Relief Organization (IIRO) and the Muslim World League (MWL). The IIRO had ties with al-Qaeda associates worldwide, including al-Zawahiri. Al-Zawahiri's brother worked for the IIRO in Albania and had actively recruited on behalf of al-Qaeda. The MWL was openly identified by al-Qaeda's leader as one of the three charities al-Qaeda primarily relied upon for funding sources.

==== Allegations of Qatari support ====
Several Qatari citizens have been accused of funding al-Qaeda. This includes Abd Al-Rahman Al-Nuaimi, a Qatari citizen and a human-rights activist who founded the Swiss-based non-governmental organization (NGO) Alkarama. In 2013, the U.S. Treasury designated Nuaimi as a terrorist for his activities supporting al-Qaeda. The U.S. Treasury Department has said Nuaimi "has facilitated significant financial support to al-Qaeda in Iraq, and served as an interlocutor between al-Qaeda in Iraq and Qatar-based donors".

Nuaimi was accused of overseeing a $2 million monthly transfer to al-Qaeda in Iraq as part of his role as mediator between Iraq-based al-Qaeda senior officers and Qatari citizens. Nuaimi allegedly entertained relationships with Abu-Khalid Al-Suri, Al-Qaeda's top envoy in Syria, who processed a $600,000 transfer to al-Qaeda in 2013. Nuaimi is also known to be associated with Abd Al-Wahhab Muhammad 'Abd Al-Rahman Al-Humayqani, a Yemeni politician and founding member of Alkarama, who was listed as a Specially Designated Global Terrorist (SDGT) by the U.S. Treasury Department in 2013. The U.S. authorities claimed that Humayqani exploited his role in Alkarama to fundraise on behalf of al-Qaeda in the Arabian Peninsula (AQAP). A prominent figure in AQAP, Nuaimi was also reported to have facilitated the flow of funding to AQAP affiliates based in Yemen. Nuaimi was also accused of investing funds in the charity directed by Humayqani to ultimately fund AQAP. About ten months after being sanctioned by the US Treasury, Nuaimi was also restrained from doing business in the UK.

Another Qatari citizen, Kalifa Mohammed Turki Subayi, was sanctioned by the US Treasury on June 5, 2008, for his activities as a "Gulf-based al-Qaeda financier". Subayi's name was added to the UN Security Council's Sanctions List in 2008 on charges of providing financial and material support to al-Qaeda senior leadership. Subayi allegedly moved al-Qaeda recruits to South Asia-based training camps. He also financially supported Khalid Sheikh Mohammed, a Pakistani national and senior al-Qaeda officer who is believed to be the mastermind behind the September 11 attacks according to the 9/11 Commission Report.

Qataris provided support to al-Qaeda through the country's largest NGO, the Qatar Charity. Al-Qaeda defector Al-Fadl, who was a former member of Qatar Charity, testified in court that Abdullah Mohammed Yusef, who served as Qatar Charity's director, was affiliated to al-Qaeda and simultaneously to the National Islamic Front, a political group that gave bin Laden harbor in Sudan in the early 1990s.

It was alleged that in 1993 bin Laden was using Middle Eastern Sunni charities to channel financial support to al-Qaeda operatives overseas. The same documents also report bin Laden's complaint that the failed assassination attempt of Egyptian President Hosni Mubarak had compromised the ability of al-Qaeda to exploit charities to support its operatives to the extent it was capable of before 1995.

Qatar financed al-Qaeda's enterprises through al-Qaeda's former affiliate in Syria, Jabhat Al-Nusra. The funding was primarily channeled through kidnapping for ransom. The Consortium Against Terrorist Finance (CATF) reported that the Gulf country has funded Al-Nusra since 2013. In 2017, Asharq Al-Awsat estimated that Qatar had disbursed $25 million in support of Al-Nusra through kidnapping for ransom. In addition, Qatar has launched fundraising campaigns on behalf of Al-Nusra. Al-Nusra acknowledged a Qatar-sponsored campaign "as one of the preferred conduits for donations intended for the group".

==== The Golden Chain ====
The "Golden Chain" is a list of sponsors of al-Qaeda seized in March 2002 in a raid by Bosnian police of the premises of the Benevolence International Foundation in Sarajevo.

The list included twenty-five names, twenty of them very wealthy Saudis and Gulf States financial sponsors including bankers, businessmen, and former ministers. Part of the list includes a computer file titled "Tarekh Osama" or "Osama History", but the appellation "Golden Chain" itself is due to Jamal Al-Fadl, who vouched for its authenticity. The computer file contained photographs of the birth and early days of al-Qaeda as well as letters and documents, some in bin Laden's handwriting. In the seized material, records were found of both the plans for al-Qaeda's activities and its organizational structure and operational foundations. These are believed to have been prepared by bin Laden and his mentor Sheikh Abdallah Azzam.

They also found a list of 20 Arab plutocrats, the "Golden Chain", who were suspected of financing international terrorism, including al-Qaeda. The custody of the secret and confidential material was entrusted to bin Laden's confidant Enaam Arnaout, who was convinced that the documents were in the safest and most secure place in the Sarajevo office of the Benevolence International Foundation. During a search of the Benevolence International Foundation's offices in Sarajevo, the relevant law enforcement agencies found clear evidence of a connection between the head of the office, Enaam Arnaout, and bin Laden, and of "militant" subordination between the two, and charges were brought against Arnaout.

Most accounts are vague on what year the Golden Chain document was written; some say 1988 but U.S. counter-terrorism advisor Richard A. Clarke says it dates from 1989. The "Golden Chain" was presented by the U.S. government in the criminal case United States v. Arnaout filed in 2003, and in other legal filings.

The American government has never publicly released the full document, and so the full list of names is a matter of conjecture and speculation. In 2003, the Wall Street Journal reported that it included "billionaire bankers Saleh Kamel and Khalid bin Mahfouz, as well as the Al-Rajhi family, another banking family, and Mr. bin Laden's brothers." Minutes of the Sarajevo meeting on 11 August 1988 confirmed that bin Laden had begun his jihadist movement at that time. Bin Laden decided to recruit members and raise funds from Saudi Arabia. To carry out his jihadist war, he had to enlist the wealthy plutocrats of the Gulf, the "Golden Chain", to fund al-Qaeda. The "Golden Chain" was a copy of a handwritten 1988 draft listing the wealthy financiers of the mujahedin's operations in Afghanistan, known within al-Qaeda as the "Golden Chain". At the top of the document, translated from Arabic by the US Department of Justice, was a quote from the Quran: 'And spend in the cause of God'.

== Strategy ==
In the disagreement over whether al-Qaeda's objectives are religious or political, Mark Sedgwick describes al-Qaeda's strategy as political in the immediate term but with ultimate aims that are religious.

In 2005, Al-Quds Al-Arabi published extracts from a document attributed to Saif al-Adel, "Al-Qaeda's Strategy to the Year 2020". In his 2006 book, Abdel Bari Atwan summarized the reported strategy as comprising five stages:

1. Provoke the United States and the West into invading a Muslim country by staging a massive attack or string of attacks on US soil that resulted in massive civilian casualties.
2. Incite local resistance to occupying forces.
3. Expand the conflict to neighboring countries and engage the US and its allies in a long war of attrition.
4. Convert al-Qaeda into an ideology and set of operating principles that could be loosely franchised in other countries without requiring direct command and control, and use these franchises to incite attacks against the US and its allies until they withdrew from the conflict. Atwan described the 2004 Madrid train bombings as having this effect, in contrast to the 7 July 2005 London bombings.
5. The final stage anticipated that the strain of multiple military engagements would cause the US economy to collapse by 2020, followed by the collapse of the worldwide economic system and global political instability. This was expected to lead to a global jihad led by al-Qaeda and the establishment of a worldwide Wahhabi caliphate.

Atwan noted that, while the plan was unrealistic, "it is sobering to consider that this virtually describes the downfall of the Soviet Union."

In 2005, Fouad Hussein, a Jordanian journalist and author who had spent time in prison with al-Zarqawi, described a seven-phase strategy that he attributed to al-Qaeda, similar to the plan described in "Al-Qaeda's Strategy to the Year 2020". His account outlined the following phases:

1. "The Awakening." This phase was supposed to last from 2001 to 2003. Its goal was to provoke the US into attacking a Muslim country through an attack that killed many civilians on US soil.
2. "Opening Eyes." This phase was supposed to last from 2003 to 2006. Its goal was to recruit young men to the cause and transform al-Qaeda from a group into a movement. Iraq was supposed to become the center of operations, with financial and military support for bases in other states.
3. "Arising and Standing up." This phase was supposed to last from 2007 to 2010. It envisaged additional attacks and a focus on Syria. Hussein believed that other countries in the Arabian Peninsula were also at risk.
4. In Hussein's account, al-Qaeda expected growth in its membership and territory as regimes in the Arabian Peninsula weakened. Attacks in this phase were supposed to focus on oil suppliers and cyberterrorism, targeting the US economy and military infrastructure.
5. The declaration of an Islamic caliphate, projected for between 2013 and 2016. By this stage, al-Qaeda was said to expect substantially reduced resistance from Israel.
6. The declaration of an "Islamic Army" and a "fight between believers and non-believers", described as "total confrontation".
7. "Definitive Victory", projected for completion by 2020.

In 2016, Charles Lister of the Middle East Institute and Katherine Zimmerman of the American Enterprise Institute described an approach focused on building ties with local communities, developing a broad territorial base of operations, and raising income independently of funding from sheikhs.

In a 2025 assessment, Colin Clarke and Clara Broekaert described al-Qaeda as a decentralized network increasingly focused on supporting regional insurgencies and exploiting local grievances. They highlighted the growing strength of al-Shabaab in Somalia and Jama'at Nasr al-Islam wal-Muslimin in the Sahel, while noting that al-Qaeda's weakened central leadership retained an intention to attack the West. Writing in 2026, Farhan Zahid characterized the approach as "strategic patience", prioritizing involvement in local insurgencies through regional affiliates over large-scale international attacks while retaining the long-term objective of establishing a global caliphate.

== Ideology ==
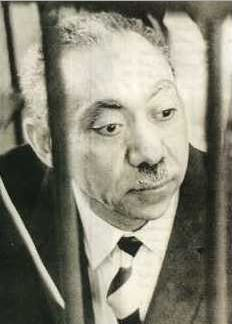
Sayyid Qutb, the Egyptian Islamic scholar and Jihadist theorist who inspired al-Qaeda

The pan-Islamist militant movement of al-Qaeda developed amid the rise of Islamic revivalist and jihadist movements after the Iranian Revolution (1978–1979) and during the Afghan Jihad (1979–1989). The writings of Egyptian Islamist scholar and revolutionary ideologue Sayyid Qutb strongly inspired the founding leaders of al-Qaeda. In the 1950s and 1960s, Qutb preached that because of the lack of sharia law, the Islamic world was no longer Muslim, and had reverted to the pre-Islamic ignorance known as jahiliyyah. To restore Islam, Qutb argued that a vanguard of righteous Muslims was needed in order to establish "true Islamic states", implement sharia, and rid the Muslim world of any non-Muslim influences. In Qutb's view, the enemies of Islam included "world Jewry", which "plotted conspiracies" and opposed Islam. Qutb envisioned this vanguard to march forward to wage armed Jihad against tyrannical regimes after purifying from the wider Jahili societies and organising themselves under a righteous Islamic leadership; which he viewed as the model of early Muslims in the Islamic State of Medina under the leadership of the Islamic prophet Muhammad. This idea would directly influence many Islamist figures such as Abdullah Azzam and bin Laden; and became the core rationale for the formulation of "al-Qaeda" concept in the near future. Outlining his strategy to topple the existing secular orders, Qutb argued in Milestones:

[It is necessary that] a Muslim community to come into existence which believes that 'there is no deity except God,' which commits itself to obey none but God, denying all other authority, and which challenges the legality of any law which is not based on this belief.. . It should come into the battlefield with the determination that its strategy, its social organization, and the relationship between its individuals should be firmer and more powerful than the existing jahili system.

In the words of Mohammed Jamal Khalifa, a close college friend of bin Laden:

Islam is different from any other religion; it's a way of life. We [Khalifa and bin Laden] were trying to understand what Islam has to say about how we eat, who we marry, how we talk. We read Sayyid Qutb. He was the one who most affected our generation.

Qutb also influenced al-Zawahiri. Al-Zawahiri's uncle and maternal family patriarch, Mafouz Azzam, was Qutb's student, protégé, personal lawyer, and an executor of his estate.

Qutb argued that many Muslims were not true Muslims. Some Muslims, Qutb argued, were apostates. These alleged apostates included leaders of Muslim countries, since they failed to enforce sharia law. He also alleged that the West approaches the Muslim World with a "crusading spirit"; in spite of the decline of religious values in the 20th century Europe. According to Qutb; the hostile and imperialist attitudes exhibited by Europeans and Americans towards Muslim countries, their support for Zionism, etc. reflected hatred amplified over a millennium of wars such as the Crusades and was born out of Roman materialist and utilitarian outlooks that viewed the world in monetary terms.

=== Formation ===
The Afghan jihad against the pro-Soviet government further developed the Salafist Jihadist movement which inspired al-Qaeda. During this period, al-Qaeda embraced the ideals of the Indian Muslim militant revivalist Syed Ahmad Barelvi (d. 1831) who led a Jihad movement against British India from the frontiers of Afghanistan and Khyber-Pakhtunkwa in the early 19th century. Al-Qaeda readily adopted Sayyid Ahmad's doctrines such as returning to the purity of early generations (Salaf as-Salih), antipathy towards Western influences and restoration of Islamic political power. According to Pakistani journalist Husain Haqqani:

Sayyid Ahmed's revival of the ideology of jihad became the prototype for subsequent Islamic militant movements in South and Central Asia and is also the main influence over the jihad network of Al Qaeda and its associated groups in the region.

=== Objectives ===
The long-term objective of al-Qaeda is to unite the Muslim World under a supra-national Islamic state known as the Khilafah (Caliphate), headed by an elected Caliph descended from the Ahl al-Bayt (Muhammad's family). The immediate objectives include the expulsion of American troops from the Arabian Peninsula, waging armed Jihad to topple U.S.-allied governments in the region, etc.

The following are the goals and some of the general policies outlined in al-Qaeda's Founding Charter "Al-Qaeda's Structure and Bylaws" issued in the meetings in Peshawar in 1988:

General Goals

i. To promote jihad awareness in the Islamic world
ii. To prepare and equip the cadres for the Islamic world through trainings and by participating in actual combat
iii. To support and sponsor the jihad movement as much as possible
iv. To coordinate Jihad movements around the world in an effort to create a unified international Jihad movement.

General Policies
1. Complete commitment to the governing rules and controls of Shari'a in all the beliefs and actions and according to the book [Qur'an] and Sunna as well as per the interpretation of the nation's scholars who serve in this domain
2. Commitment to Jihad as a fight for God's cause and as an agenda of change and to prepare for it and apply it whenever we find it possible...
4. Our position with respect to the tyrants of the world, secular and national parties and the like is not to associate with them, to discredit them and to be their constant enemy till they believe in God alone. We shall not agree with them on half-solutions and there is no way to negotiate with them or appease them
5. Our relationships with truthful Islamic jihadist movements and groups is to cooperate under the umbrella of faith and belief and we shall always attempt to at uniting and integrating with them...
6. We shall carry a relationship of love and affection with the Islamic movements who are not aligned with Jihad...
7. We shall sustain a relationship of respect and love with active scholars...
9. We shall reject the regional fanatics and will pursue Jihad in an Islamic country as needed and when possible
10. We shall care about the role of Muslim people in the Jihad and we shall attempt to recruit them...
11. We shall maintain our economic independence and will not rely on others to secure our resources.
12. Secrecy is the main ingredient of our work except for what the need deems necessary to reveal

13. Our policy with the Afghani Jihad is support, advise and coordination with the Islamic Establishments in Jihad arenas in a manner that conforms with our policies"

— Al-Qa`ida's Structure and Bylaws, p.2,

=== Theory of Islamic State ===
Al-Qaeda aims to establish an Islamic state in the Muslim world, modelled after the Rashidun Caliphate, by initiating a global Jihad against the "International Jewish-Crusader Alliance" led by the United States, which it sees as the "external enemy" and against the secular governments in Muslim countries, that are described as "the apostate domestic enemy". Once foreign influences and the secular ruling authorities are removed from Muslim countries through Jihad; al-Qaeda supports elections to choose the rulers of its proposed Islamic states. This is to be done through representatives of leadership councils (Shura) that would ensure the implementation of Sharia law. However, it opposes elections that institute parliaments which empower Muslim and non-Muslim legislators to collaborate in making laws of their own choosing. In the second edition of his book Knights Under the Banner of the Prophet, Ayman al-Zawahiri writes:

We demand... the government of the rightly guiding caliphate, which is established on the basis of the sovereignty of sharia and not on the whims of the majority. Its ummah chooses its rulers....If they deviate, the ummah brings them to account and removes them. The ummah participates in producing that government's decisions and determining its direction. ... [The caliphal state] commands the right and forbids the wrong and engages in jihad to liberate Muslim lands and to free all humanity from all oppression and ignorance.

=== Grievances ===
A recurring theme in al-Qaeda's ideology is the perpetual grievance over the violent subjugation of Islamic dissidents by the authoritarian, secularist regimes allied to the West. Al-Qaeda denounces these post-colonial governments as a system led by Westernised elites designed to advance neo-colonialism and maintain Western hegemony over the Muslim World. The most prominent topic of grievance is over the American foreign policy in the Arab World; especially over its strong economic and military support to Israel. Other concerns of resentment include presence of NATO troops to support allied regimes; injustices committed against Muslims in Kashmir, Chechnya, Xinjiang, Syria, Afghanistan, Iraq, and other regions.

== Religious compatibility ==
Abdel Bari Atwan wrote that:

While the leadership's own theological platform is essentially Salafi, the organization's umbrella is sufficiently wide to encompass various schools of thought and political leanings. Al-Qaeda counts among its members and supporters people associated with Wahhabism, Shafi'ism, Malikism, and Hanafism. There are even some Al-Qaeda members whose beliefs and practices are directly at odds with Salafism, such as Yunis Khalis, one of the leaders of the Afghan mujahedin. He was a mystic who visited the tombs of saints and sought their blessings – practices inimical to bin Laden's Wahhabi-Salafi school of thought. The only exception to this pan-Islamic policy is Shi'ism. Al-Qaeda seems implacably opposed to it, as it holds Shi'ism to be heresy. In Iraq it has openly declared war on the Badr Brigades, who have fully cooperated with the US, and now considers even Shi'i civilians to be legitimate targets for acts of violence.

On the other hand, Professor Peter Mandaville states that al-Qaeda follows a pragmatic policy in forming its local affiliates, with various cells being sub-contracted to Shia Muslim and non-Muslim members. The top-down chain of command means that each unit is answerable directly to central leadership, while they remain ignorant of their counterparts' presence or activities. These transnational networks of autonomous supply chains, financiers, underground militias and political supporters were set up during the 1990s, when Bin Laden's immediate aim was the expulsion of American troops from the Arabian Peninsula.

=== Attacks on civilians ===
Under the leadership of bin Laden and Al-Zawahiri, al-Qaeda organization adopted the strategy of targeting non-combatant civilians of enemy states that indiscriminately attacked Muslims. Following the September 11 attacks, al-Qaeda provided a justification for the killing of non-combatants/civilians, entitled, "A Statement from Qaidat Al-Jihad Regarding the Mandates of the Heroes and the Legality of the Operations in New York and Washington". According to critics Quintan Wiktorowicz and John Kaltner, it provides "ample theological justification for killing civilians in almost any imaginable situation."

Among these justifications are that America is leading the west in waging a war on Islam so that attacks on America are a defense of Islam and any treaties and agreements between Muslim majority states and Western countries that would be violated by attacks are null and void. According to the tract, several conditions allow for the killing of civilians including:

- retaliation for the American war on Islam which al-Qaeda alleges has targeted "Muslim women, children and elderly";
- when it is too difficult to distinguish between non-combatants and combatants when attacking an enemy "stronghold" (hist) or non-combatants remain in enemy territory, killing them is allowed;
- those who assist the enemy "in deed, word, mind" are eligible for killing, and this includes the general population in democratic countries because civilians can vote in elections that bring enemies of Islam to power;
- the necessity of killing in the war to protect Islam and Muslims;
- Muhammad, when asked whether the Muslim fighters could use the catapult against the village of Taif, replied affirmatively, even though the enemy fighters were mixed with a civilian population;
- if the women, children and other protected groups serve as human shields for the enemy;
- if the enemy has broken a treaty, killing of civilians is permitted.

Under the leadership of Saif Al-Adel, al-Qaeda's strategy has undergone transformation and the organization has officially renounced the tactic of attacking civilian targets of enemies. In his book Free Reading of 33 Strategies of War published in 2023, Sayf Al-Adel counselled Islamist fighters to prioritize attacking the police forces, military soldiers, state assets of enemy governments, etc. which he described as acceptable targets in military operations. Asserting that attacking women and children of enemies are contrary to Islamic values, Sayf Al-Adel asked: "If we target the general public, how can we expect their people to accept our call to Islam?"

== History ==
=== 1990s ===
Nairobi, Kenya: August 7, 1998 Dar es Salaam, Tanzania: August 7, 1998 Aden, Yemen: October 12, 2000 World Trade Center, US: September 11, 2001 The Pentagon, US: September 11, 2001 Istanbul, Turkey: November 15 and 20, 2003

To prevent the former Afghan king Mohammed Zahir Shah from coming back from exile and possibly becoming head of a new government, bin Laden instructed a Portuguese convert to Islam, Paulo Jose de Almeida Santos, to assassinate Zahir Shah. On November 4, 1991, Santos entered the king's villa in Rome posing as a journalist and tried to stab him with a dagger. A tin of cigarillos in the king's breast pocket deflected the blade and saved Zahir Shah's life, although the king was also stabbed several times in the neck and was taken to hospital, later recovering from the attack. Santos was apprehended by General Abdul Wali, a former commander of the Royal Afghan Army, and jailed for 10 years in Italy.

On December 29, 1992, al-Qaeda launched the 1992 Yemen hotel bombings. Two bombs were detonated in Aden, Yemen. The first target was the Movenpick Hotel and the second was the parking lot of the Goldmohur Hotel.

The bombings were an attempt to eliminate American soldiers on their way to Somalia to take part in the international famine relief effort, Operation Restore Hope. Internally, al-Qaeda considered the bombing a victory that frightened the Americans away, but in the U.S., the attack was barely noticed. No American soldiers were killed because no soldiers were staying in the hotel at the time it was bombed, however, an Australian tourist and a Yemeni hotel worker were killed in the bombing. Seven others, who were mostly Yemeni, were severely injured. Two fatwas are said to have been appointed by al-Qaeda's members, Mamdouh Mahmud Salim, to justify the killings according to Islamic law. Salim referred to a famous fatwa appointed by Ibn Taymiyyah, a 13th-century scholar admired by Wahhabis, which sanctioned resistance by any means during the Mongol invasions.

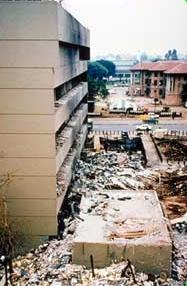
1998 Nairobi embassy bombing

In 1996, bin Laden personally engineered a plot to assassinate U.S. president Bill Clinton while the president was in Manila for the Asia-Pacific Economic Cooperation. However, intelligence agents intercepted a message before the motorcade was to leave, and alerted the U.S. Secret Service. Agents later discovered a bomb planted under a bridge.

On August 7, 1998, al-Qaeda bombed the U.S. embassies in East Africa, killing 224 people, including 12 Americans. In retaliation, a barrage of cruise missiles launched by the U.S. devastated an al-Qaeda base in Khost, Afghanistan. The network's capacity was unharmed. In late 1999 and 2000, al-Qaeda planned attacks to coincide with the millennium, masterminded by Abu Zubaydah and involving Abu Qatada, which would include the bombing of Christian holy sites in Jordan, the bombing of Los Angeles International Airport by Ahmed Ressam, and the bombing of the USS The Sullivans (DDG-68).

On October 12, 2000, al-Qaeda militants in Yemen bombed the missile destroyer USS Cole in a suicide attack, killing 17 sailors, and damaging the vessel while it lay offshore. Inspired by the success of such a brazen attack, al-Qaeda's command core began to prepare for an attack on the U.S. itself.

=== September 11 attacks ===
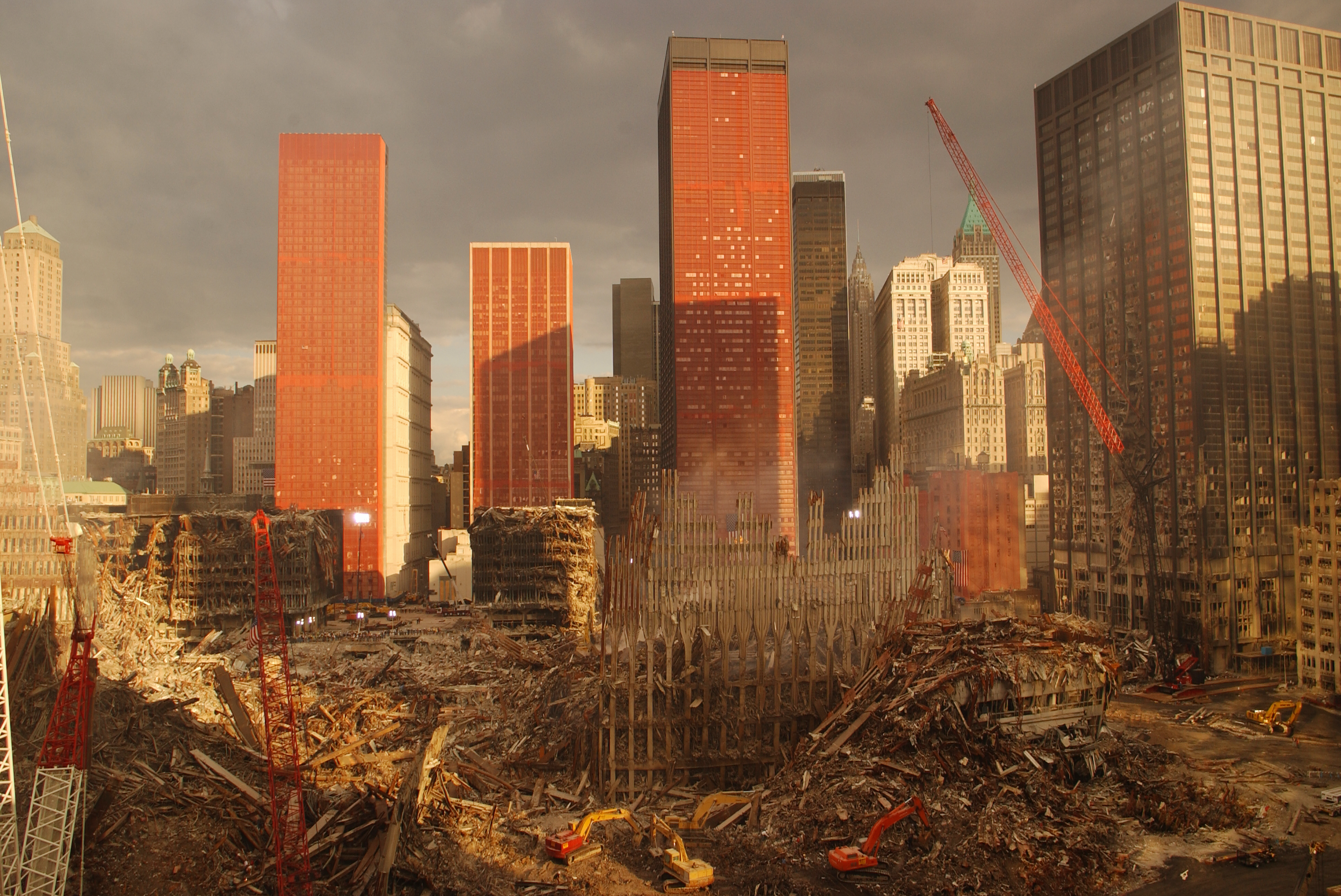
Aftermath of the September 11 attacks

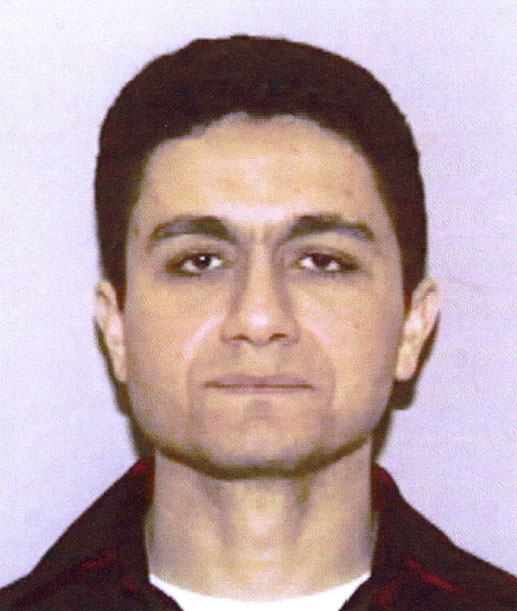
Mohamed Atta, the hijacker-pilot of American Airlines Flight 11

Al-Qaeda's September 11 attacks (9/11) on America killed 2,996 people – 2,507 civilians, 343 firefighters, 72 law enforcement officers, 55 military personnel as well as al-Qaeda's 19 hijackers, who committed murder-suicide. Two commercial airliners were deliberately flown into the Twin Towers of the World Trade Center, a third into the Pentagon, and a fourth, likely targeting either the U.S. Capitol or the White House, crashed in a field in Stonycreek Township near Shanksville, Pennsylvania, after passengers revolted. It was the deadliest foreign attack on American soil since the Japanese attack on Pearl Harbor on December 7, 1941, and to this day remains the deadliest terrorist attack in human history.

The attacks were conducted by al-Qaeda, acting in accord with the 1998 fatwa issued against the US and its allies by persons under the command of bin Laden, Al-Zawahiri, and others. Evidence points to suicide squads led by al-Qaeda military commander Mohamed Atta as the culprits of the attacks, with bin Laden, Ayman Al-Zawahiri, Khalid Sheikh Mohammed, and Hambali as the key planners and part of the political and military command.

Messages issued by bin Laden after 9/11 explained al-Qaeda's motivation. He mainly said that 9/11 came from U.S. foreign policy that were oppressing Muslims. In his "Letter to the American people" published in 2002, bin Laden stated:

Why are we fighting and opposing you? The answer is very simple: ... Because you attacked us and continue to attack us. ... The American government and press still refuses to answer the question: Why did they attack us in New York and Washington?If Sharon is a man of peace in the eyes of Bush, then we are also men of peace!!! America does not understand the language of manners and principles, so we are addressing it using the language it understands.

Bin Laden asserted that America was massacring Muslims in "Palestine, Chechnya, Kashmir, and Iraq" and Muslims should retain the "right to attack in reprisal". He also claimed the 9/11 attacks were not targeted at people, but "America's icons of military and economic power", despite the fact he planned to attack in the morning when most of the people in the intended targets were present and thus generating the maximum number of human casualties.

Evidence later came to light that the original targets for the attack may have been nuclear power stations on the U.S. East Coast. The targets were later altered by Al-Qaeda, as it was feared that such an attack "might get out of hand".

=== War on terror ===
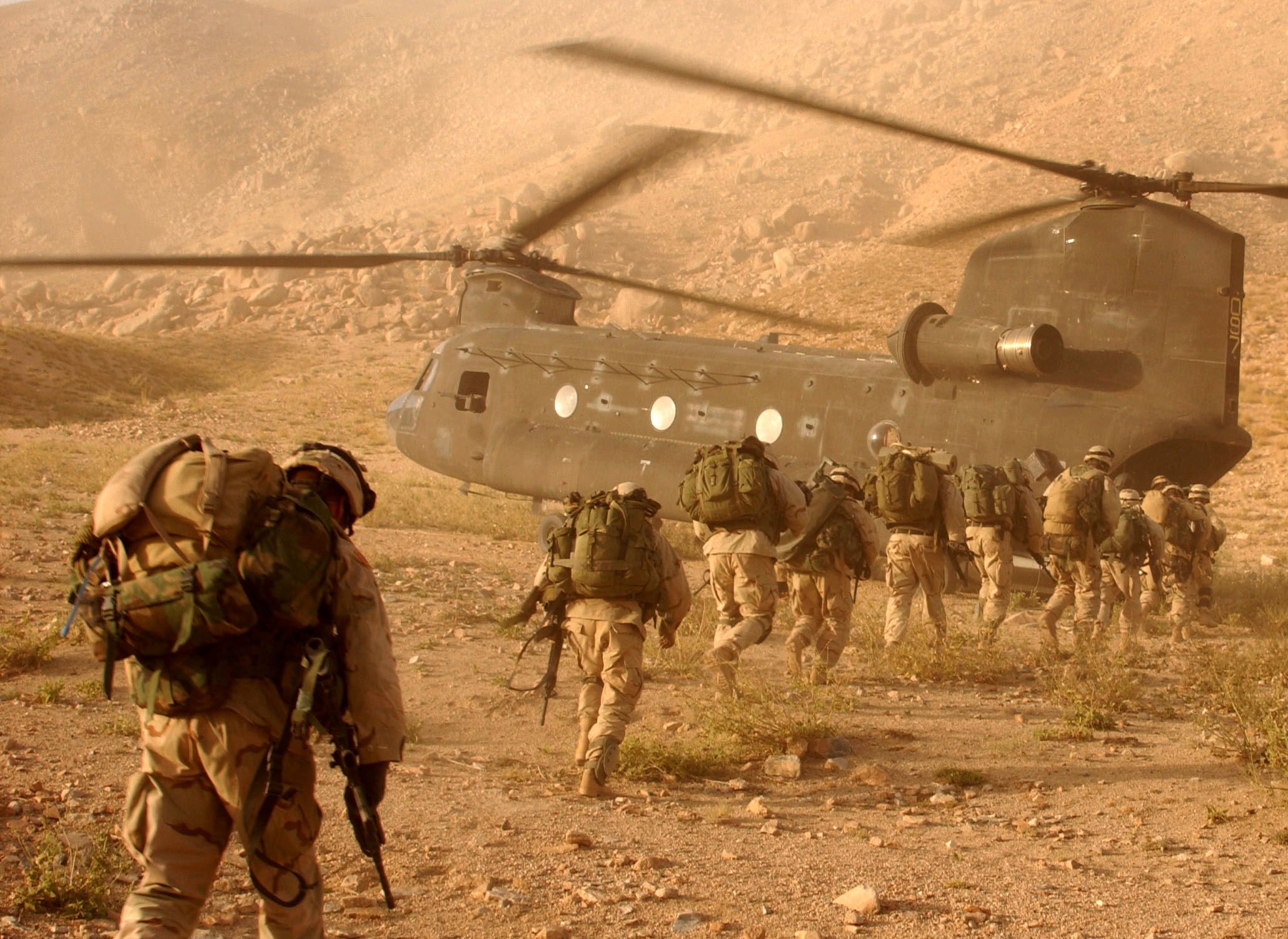
US troops in Afghanistan

In the immediate aftermath of the 9/11 attacks, the U.S. government responded, and began to prepare its armed forces to overthrow the Taliban, which it believed was harboring al-Qaeda. The US offered Taliban leader Mullah Omar a chance to surrender bin Laden and his top associates. The first forces to be inserted into Afghanistan were paramilitary officers from the CIA's elite Special Activities Division (SAD).

The Taliban offered to turn over bin Laden to a neutral country for trial if the US would provide evidence of bin Laden's complicity in the attacks. U.S. president George W. Bush responded by saying: "We know he's guilty. Turn him over", and British Prime Minister Tony Blair warned the Taliban regime: "Surrender bin Laden, or surrender power."

Soon thereafter the U.S. and its allies invaded Afghanistan, and together with the Afghan Northern Alliance removed the Taliban government as part of the war in Afghanistan. As a result of the US special forces and air support for the Northern Alliance ground forces, a number of Taliban and al-Qaeda training camps were destroyed, and much of the operating structure of al-Qaeda is believed to have been disrupted. After being driven from their key positions in the Tora Bora area of Afghanistan, many al-Qaeda fighters tried to regroup in the rugged Gardez region of the nation.

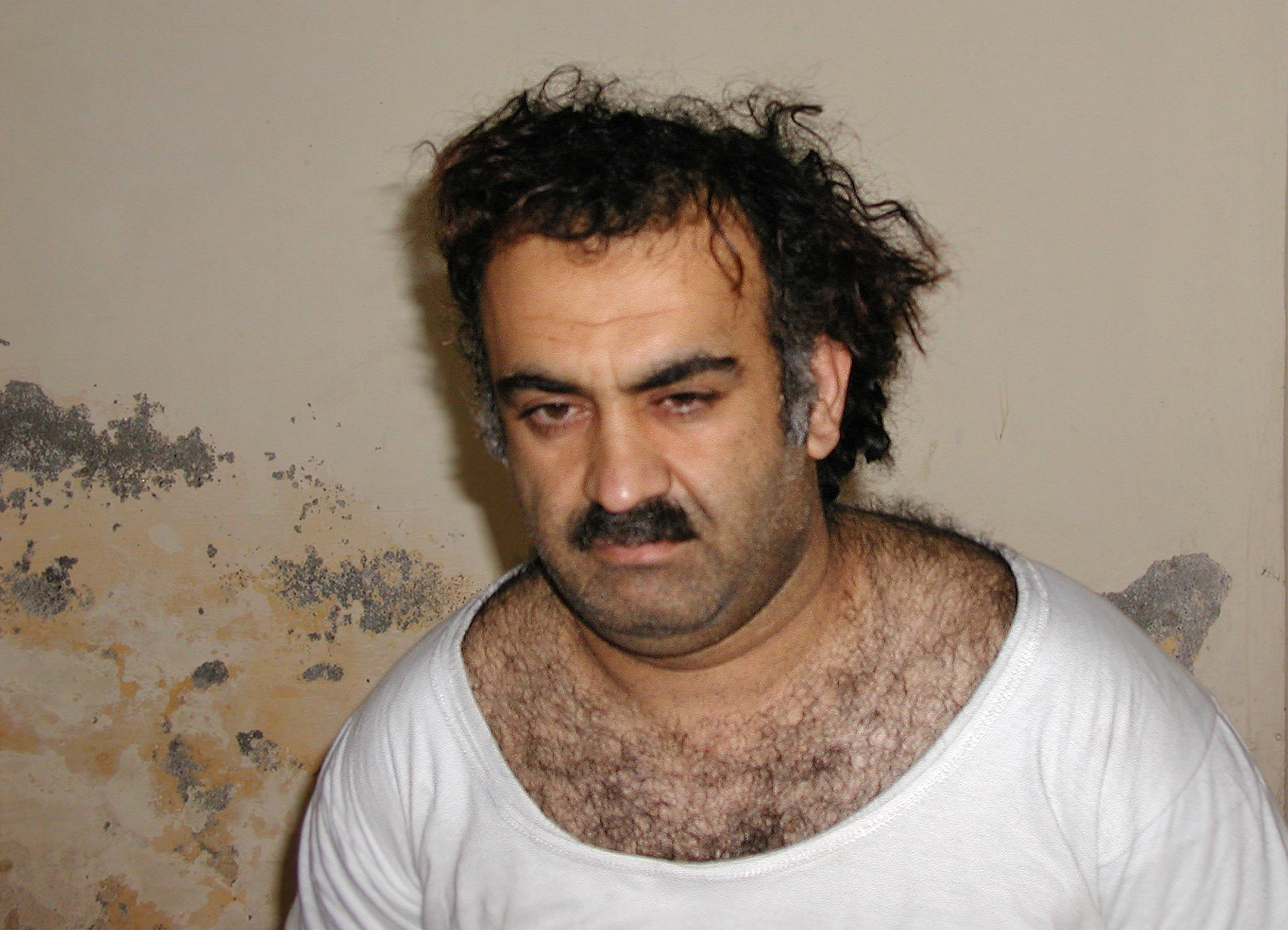
Khalid Sheikh Mohammed after his arrest in Rawalpindi, Pakistan, in March 2003

By early 2002, al-Qaeda had been dealt a serious blow to its operational capacity, and the Afghan invasion appeared to be a success. Nevertheless, a significant Taliban insurgency remained in Afghanistan.

Debate continued regarding the nature of al-Qaeda's role in the 9/11 attacks. The U.S. State Department released a videotape showing bin Laden speaking with a small group of associates somewhere in Afghanistan shortly before the Taliban was removed from power. Although its authenticity has been questioned by a couple of people, the tape definitively implicates bin Laden and al-Qaeda in 9/11. The tape was aired on many television channels, with an accompanying English translation provided by the US Defense Department.

In September 2004, the 9/11 Commission officially concluded that the attacks were conceived and implemented by al-Qaeda operatives. In October 2004, bin Laden appeared to claim responsibility for the attacks in a videotape released through Al Jazeera, saying he was inspired by Israeli attacks on high-rises in the 1982 invasion of Lebanon: "As I looked at those demolished towers in Lebanon, it entered my mind that we should punish the oppressor in kind and that we should destroy towers in America in order that they taste some of what we tasted and so that they be deterred from killing our women and children."

By the end of 2004, the U.S. government proclaimed that two-thirds of the most senior al-Qaeda figures from 2001 had been captured and interrogated by the CIA: Abu Zubaydah, Ramzi bin Al-Shibh, and Abd Al-Rahim Al-Nashiri in 2002; Khalid Sheikh Mohammed in 2003; and Saif al Islam el Masry in 2004. Mohammed Atef and several others were killed. The West was criticized for not being able to handle al-Qaeda despite a decade of the war.

== Activities ==
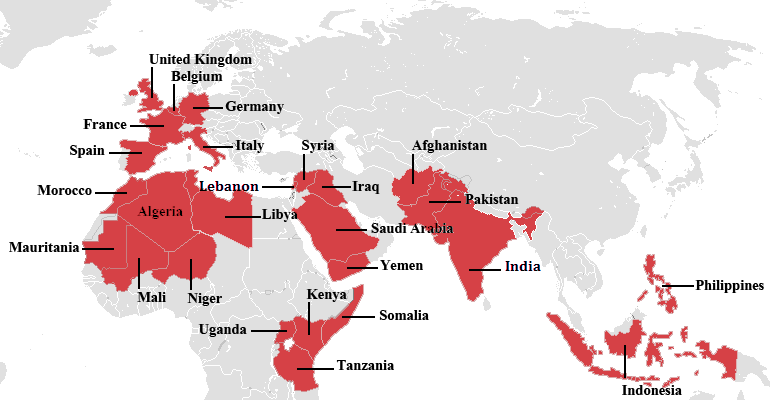
Main countries of activity of al-Qaeda

=== Africa ===
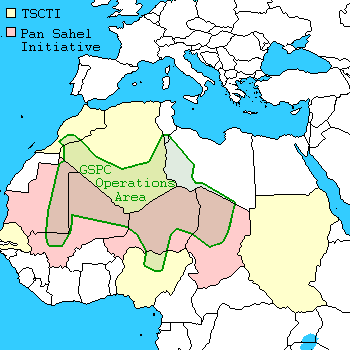
Al-Qaeda in the Islamic Maghreb (formerly GSPC) area of operations

Al-Qaeda involvement in Africa has included a number of bombing attacks in North Africa, while supporting parties in civil wars in Eritrea and Somalia. From 1991 to 1996, bin Laden and other al-Qaeda leaders were based in Sudan.

Islamist rebels in the Sahara calling themselves al-Qaeda in the Islamic Maghreb stepped up their violence in the years before 2009. French officials say the rebels have no real links to the al-Qaeda leadership, but this has been disputed. It seems likely that bin Laden approved the group's name in late 2006, and the rebels "took on the al-Qaeda franchise label", almost a year before the violence began to escalate.

Somali Islamist organization Al-Shabaab occasionally harboured al-Qaeda leaders in Somalia, in exchange for their technical assistance. In September 2009, in a video entitled "At Your Service Osama", Al-Shabaab members publicly declared allegiance to bin Laden—but this reflected an "unrequited courtship", largely ignored by al-Qaeda.

In Mali, the Ansar Dine faction was also reported as an ally of al-Qaeda in 2013.

In 2011, al-Qaeda's North African wing condemned Libyan leader Muammar Gaddafi and declared support for the Anti-Gaddafi rebels.

Following the Libyan Civil War, the removal of Gaddafi and the ensuing period of post-civil war violence in Libya, various Islamist militant groups affiliated with al-Qaeda were able to expand their operations in the region. The 2012 Benghazi attack, which resulted in the death of U.S. Ambassador J. Christopher Stevens and three other Americans, is suspected of having been carried out by various Jihadist networks, such as AQIM, Ansar Al-Sharia and several other al-Qaeda-affiliated groups. The capture of Nazih Abdul-Hamed Al-Ruqai, a senior al-Qaeda operative wanted by the U.S. for his involvement in the 1998 U.S. embassy bombings, on October 5, 2013, by U.S. Navy Seals, FBI, and CIA agents illustrates the importance the U.S. and other Western allies have placed on North Africa.

=== Europe ===
Before 9/11 and the U.S. invasion of Afghanistan, westerners who had been recruits at al-Qaeda training camps were sought after by al-Qaeda's military wing. Language skills and knowledge of Western culture were generally found among recruits from Europe, such was the case with Mohamed Atta, an Egyptian national studying in Germany at the time of his training, and other members of the Hamburg cell. Osama bin Laden, and Mohammed Atef would later designate Atta as the ringleader of the 9/11 hijackers. Following the attacks, Western intelligence agencies determined that al-Qaeda cells operating in Europe had aided the hijackers with financing and communications with the central leadership based in Afghanistan.

In 2003, Islamists carried out a series of bombings in Istanbul, killing 57 people and injuring 700. Seventy-four people were charged by the Turkish authorities. Some had previously met bin Laden, and though they specifically declined to pledge allegiance to al-Qaeda they asked for its blessing and help.

In 2009, three Londoners, Tanvir Hussain, Assad Sarwar and Ahmed Abdullah Ali, were convicted of conspiring to detonate bombs disguised as soft drinks on seven airplanes bound for Canada and the U.S. The MI5 investigation regarding the plot involved more than a year of surveillance work conducted by over two hundred officers. British and U.S. officials said the plot – unlike many similar homegrown European Islamic militant plots – was directly linked to al-Qaeda and guided by senior al-Qaeda members in Pakistan.

In 2012, Russian Intelligence indicated that al-Qaeda had given a call for "forest jihad" and has been starting massive forest fires as part of a strategy of "thousand cuts".

=== Arab world ===
USS Cole after the October 2000 attack

Following Yemeni unification in 1990, Wahhabi networks began moving missionaries into the country. Although it is unlikely bin Laden or Saudi al-Qaeda were directly involved, the personal connections they made would be established over the next decade and used in the USS Cole bombing. Concerns grew over al-Qaeda's group in Yemen.

In Iraq, al-Qaeda forces loosely associated with the leadership were embedded in the Jama'at Al-Tawhid wal-Jihad group commanded by Abu Musab al-Zarqawi. Specializing in suicide operations, they have been a "key driver" of the Sunni insurgency. Although they played a small part in the overall insurgency, between 30% and 42% of all suicide bombings which took place in the early years were claimed by al-Zarqawi's group. Reports have indicated that oversights such as the failure to control access to the Qa'qaa munitions factory in Yusufiyah have allowed large quantities of munitions to fall into the hands of al-Qaeda. In November 2010, the militant group Islamic State of Iraq, which is linked to al-Qaeda in Iraq, threatened to "exterminate all Iraqi Christians".

Al-Qaeda did not begin training Palestinians until the late 1990s. Large groups such as Hamas and Palestinian Islamic Jihad have rejected an alliance with al-Qaeda, fearing that al-Qaeda will co-opt their cells. This may have changed recently. The Israeli security and intelligence services believe al-Qaeda has managed to infiltrate operatives from the Occupied Territories into Israel, and is waiting for an opportunity to attack.

As of 2015, Saudi Arabia, Qatar and Turkey are openly supporting the Army of Conquest, an umbrella rebel group fighting in the Syrian civil war against the Syrian government that reportedly includes an al-Qaeda linked Al-Nusra Front and another Salafi coalition known as Ahrar Al-Sham.

=== Kashmir ===
Bin Laden and al-Zawahiri consider India to be a part of an alleged Crusader-Zionist-Hindu conspiracy against the Islamic world. Bin Laden was involved in training militants for Jihad in Kashmir while living in Sudan in the early 1990s. By 2001, Kashmiri militant group Harkat-ul-Mujahideen had become a part of the al-Qaeda coalition. According to the UN High Commissioner for Refugees (UNHCR), al-Qaeda was thought to have established bases in Pakistan administered Kashmir (in Azad Kashmir, and to some extent in Gilgit–Baltistan) during the 1999 Kargil War and continued to operate there with tacit approval of Pakistan's Intelligence services.

Many of the militants active in Kashmir were trained in the same madrasahs as Taliban and al-Qaeda. Fazlur Rehman Khalil of Kashmiri militant group Harkat-ul-Mujahideen was a signatory of al-Qaeda's 1998 declaration of jihad against America and its allies. In his 2002 Letter to the American People, bin Laden wrote that one of the reasons he was fighting America was because of its support to India on the Kashmir issue. In November 2001, Kathmandu airport went on high alert after threats that bin Laden planned to hijack a plane and crash it into a target in New Delhi. In 2002, U.S. Secretary of Defense Donald Rumsfeld, on a trip to Delhi, suggested that al-Qaeda was active in Kashmir though he did not have any evidence. Rumsfeld proposed hi-tech ground sensors along the Line of Control to prevent militants from infiltrating into Indian-administered Kashmir. An investigation in 2002 found evidence that al-Qaeda and its affiliates were prospering in Pakistan-administered Kashmir with tacit approval of Pakistan's Inter-Services Intelligence. In 2002, U.S. and British special operatives were sent into Indian-administered Kashmir to hunt for bin Laden after receiving reports that he was being sheltered by Kashmiri militant group Harkat-ul-Mujahideen, which had been responsible for kidnapping western tourists in Kashmir in 1995. Britain's highest-ranking al-Qaeda operative Rangzieb Ahmed had previously fought in Kashmir with the group Harkat-ul-Mujahideen and spent time in Indian prison after being captured in Kashmir.

U.S. officials believe al-Qaeda was helping organize attacks in Kashmir in order to provoke conflict between India and Pakistan. Their strategy was to force Pakistan to move its troops to the border with India, thereby relieving pressure on al-Qaeda elements hiding in northwestern Pakistan. In 2006, al-Qaeda claimed they had established a wing in Kashmir. However Indian Army General H. S. Panag argued that the army had ruled out the presence of al-Qaeda in Indian-administered Jammu and Kashmir. Panag also said al-Qaeda had strong ties with Kashmiri militant groups Lashkar-e-Taiba and Jaish-e-Mohammed based in Pakistan. It has been noted that Waziristan has become a battlefield for Kashmiri militants fighting NATO in support of al-Qaeda and Taliban. Dhiren Barot, who wrote the Army of Madinah in Kashmir and was an al-Qaeda operative convicted for involvement in the 2004 financial buildings plot, had received training in weapons and explosives at a militant training camp in Kashmir.

Maulana Masood Azhar, the founder of Kashmiri group Jaish-e-Mohammed, is believed to have met bin Laden several times and received funding from him. In 2002, Jaish-e-Mohammed organized the kidnapping and murder of Daniel Pearl in an operation run in conjunction with al-Qaeda and funded by bin Laden. According to American counter-terrorism expert Bruce Riedel, al-Qaeda and Taliban were closely involved in the 1999 hijacking of Indian Airlines Flight 814 to Kandahar which led to the release of Maulana Masood Azhar and Ahmed Omar Saeed Sheikh from an Indian prison. This hijacking, Riedel said, was rightly described by then Indian Foreign Minister Jaswant Singh as a 'dress rehearsal' for September 11 attacks. Bin Laden personally welcomed Azhar and threw a lavish party in his honor after his release. Ahmed Omar Saeed Sheikh, who had been in prison for his role in the 1994 kidnappings of Western tourists in India, went on to murder Daniel Pearl and was sentenced to death in Pakistan. al-Qaeda operative Rashid Rauf, who was one of the accused in 2006 transatlantic aircraft plot, was related to Maulana Masood Azhar by marriage.

Lashkar-e-Taiba, which is thought to be behind 2008 Mumbai attacks, is also known to have strong ties to senior al-Qaeda leaders living in Pakistan. In late 2002, top al-Qaeda operative Abu Zubaydah was arrested while being sheltered by Lashkar-e-Taiba in a safe house in Faisalabad. The FBI once stated al-Qaeda and Lashkar have been "intertwined" for a long time, while the CIA said that al-Qaeda funds Lashkar-e-Taiba. Jean-Louis Bruguière said in 2009 that "Lashkar-e-Taiba is no longer a Pakistani movement with only a Kashmir political or military agenda. Lashkar-e-Taiba is a member of al-Qaeda."

In a video released in 2008, al-Qaeda operative Adam Yahiye Gadahn said that "victory in Kashmir has been delayed for years; it is the liberation of the jihad there from this interference which, God willing, will be the first step towards victory over the Hindu occupiers of that Islam land."

In September 2009, a U.S. drone strike reportedly killed Ilyas Kashmiri who was the chief of Harkat-ul-Jihad Al-Islami, a Kashmiri militant group associated with al-Qaeda. Kashmiri was described by Riedel as a prominent al-Qaeda member while others have described him as head of military operations for al-Qaeda. Kashmiri was also charged by the US in a plot against Jyllands-Posten, the Danish newspaper which was at the center of the 2005 Muhammad cartoons controversy. US officials also believe that Kashmiri was involved in the Camp Chapman attack against the CIA. In January 2010, Indian authorities notified Britain of an al-Qaeda plot to hijack an Indian Airlines or Air India plane, and crash it into a British city. This information was uncovered from interrogation of Amjad Khwaja, an operative of Harkat-ul-Jihad Al-Islami, who had been arrested in India.

In January 2010, US Defense Secretary Robert Gates, while on a visit to Pakistan, said that al-Qaeda was seeking to destabilize the region and planning to provoke a nuclear war between India and Pakistan.

=== Internet ===
Al-Qaeda and its successors have migrated online to escape detection in an atmosphere of increased international vigilance. The group's use of the Internet has grown more sophisticated, with online activities that include financing, recruitment, networking, mobilization, publicity, and information dissemination, gathering and sharing.

Abu Ayyub Al-Masri's al-Qaeda movement in Iraq regularly releases short videos glorifying the activity of jihadist suicide bombers. In addition, both before and after the death of al-Zarqawi, the umbrella organization to which al-Qaeda in Iraq belongs, the Mujahideen Shura Council, has a regular presence on the Web.

The range of multimedia content includes guerrilla training clips, stills of victims about to be murdered, testimonials of suicide bombers, and videos that show participation in jihad through stylized portraits of mosques and musical scores. A website associated with al-Qaeda posted a video of captured American entrepreneur Nick Berg being decapitated in Iraq. Other decapitation videos and pictures, including those of Paul Johnson, Kim Sun-il (posted on websites), and Daniel Pearl obtained by investigators, have taken place.

In December 2004 an audio message claiming to be from bin Laden was posted directly to a website, rather than sending a copy to Al Jazeera as he had done in the past. Al-Qaeda turned to the Internet for release of its videos in order to be certain they would be available unedited, rather than risk the possibility of al Jazeera editing out anything critical of the Saudi royal family.

The US government charged a British information technology specialist, Babar Ahmad, with terrorist offences related to his operating a network of English-language al-Qaeda websites, such as Azzam.com. He was convicted and sentenced to 12 1/2 years in prison.

==== Online communications ====
In 2007, al-Qaeda released Mujahedeen Secrets, encryption software used for online and cellular communications. A later version, Mujahideen Secrets 2, was released in 2008.

=== Aviation network ===
According to the U.S., as of 2010, al-Qaeda was operating a clandestine aviation network including "several Boeing 727 aircraft", turboprops, and executive jets. At that time, Al-Qaeda was also possibly using aircraft to transport drugs and weapons from South America to various unstable countries in West Africa. A Boeing 727 can carry up to ten tons of cargo. The drugs eventually are smuggled to Europe for distribution and sale, and the weapons are used in conflicts in Africa and possibly elsewhere. Gunmen with links to al-Qaeda have been increasingly kidnapping Europeans for ransom. The profits from the drug and weapon sales, and kidnappings can, in turn, fund more militant activities.

=== Involvement in military conflicts ===
The following is a list of military conflicts in which al-Qaeda and its direct affiliates have taken part militarily.

Start of conflict	End of conflict	Conflict	Location	Branches involved
1991	ongoing	Somali Civil War	Somalia	Al-Qaeda Central
1992	1996	Civil war in Afghanistan (1992–1996)	Islamic State of Afghanistan	Al-Qaeda Central
1992	ongoing	Al-Qaeda insurgency in Yemen	Yemen	Al-Qaeda in the Arabian Peninsula
1996	2001	Civil war in Afghanistan (1996–2001)	Islamic Emirate of Afghanistan	Al-Qaeda Central
2001	2021	War in Afghanistan (2001–2021)	Afghanistan	Al-Qaeda Central
2002	ongoing	Insurgency in the Maghreb (2002–present)	Algeria; Chad; Mali; Mauritania; Morocco; Niger; Tunisia	Al-Qaeda in the Islamic Maghreb
2003	2011	Iraq War	Iraq	Al-Qaeda in Iraq Islamic State of Iraq
2004	ongoing	War in North-West Pakistan	Pakistan	Al-Qaeda Central
2009	2017	Insurgency in the North Caucasus	Russia	Caucasus Emirate
2011	ongoing	Syrian civil war	Syria	al-Nusra Front
2015	ongoing	Saudi Arabian-led intervention in Yemen	Yemen	Al-Qaeda in the Arabian Peninsula

== Broader influence ==
Anders Behring Breivik, the perpetrator of the 2011 Norway attacks, was inspired by al-Qaeda, calling it "the most successful revolutionary movement in the world." While admitting different aims, he sought to "create a European version of al-Qaeda."

The appropriate response to offshoots is a subject of debate. A journalist reported in 2012 that a senior U.S. military planner had asked: "Should we resort to drones and Special Operations raids every time some group raises the black banner of al-Qaeda? How long can we continue to chase offshoots of offshoots around the world?"

== Criticism ==
A number of "religious scholars, former fighters and militants" who previously supported the Islamic State of Iraq (ISI) had turned against the al-Qaeda-supported Iraqi insurgency in 2008; due to ISI's indiscriminate attacks against civilians while targeting U.S.-led coalition forces. American military analyst Bruce Riedel wrote in 2008 that "a wave of revulsion" arose against ISI, which enabled U.S.-allied Sons of Iraq faction to turn various tribal leaders in the Anbar region against the Iraqi insurgency. In response, bin Laden and al-Zawahiri issued public statements urging Muslims to rally behind ISI leadership and support the armed struggle against American forces.

In November 2007, former Libyan Islamic Fighting Group (LIFG) member Noman Benotman responded with a public, open letter of criticism to al-Zawahiri, after persuading the imprisoned senior leaders of his former group to enter into peace negotiations with the Libyan regime. While al-Zawahiri announced the affiliation of the group with al-Qaeda in November 2007, the Libyan government released 90 members of the group from prison several months after "they were said to have renounced violence."

In 2007, on the anniversary of 9/11, the Saudi sheikh Salman Al-Ouda delivered a personal rebuke to bin Laden on television, asking him:

My brother Osama, how much blood has been spilt? How many innocent people, children, elderly, and women have been killed ... in the name of al-Qaeda? Will you be happy to meet God Almighty carrying the burden of these hundreds of thousands or millions [of victims] on your back?

According to Pew polls, support for al-Qaeda had dropped in the Muslim world in the years before 2008. In Saudi Arabia, only ten percent had a favorable view of al-Qaeda, according to a 2007 poll by Terror Free Tomorrow, an American think tank.

In 2007, the imprisoned Dr. Fadl, who was an influential Afghan Arab and former associate of al-Zawahiri, withdrew his support from al-Qaeda and criticized the organization in his book Wathiqat Tarshid Al-'Aml Al-Jihadi fi Misr w'Al-'Alam (English: Rationalizing Jihad in Egypt and the World). In response, al-Zawahiri accused Fadl of promoting "an Islam without jihad" that aligns with Western interests and wrote a nearly two hundred pages long treatise, titled "The Exoneration" which appeared on the Internet in March 2008. In his treatise, al-Zawahiri justified military strikes against U.S. targets as retaliatory attacks to defend Muslim community against American aggression.

In an online town hall forum conducted in 2007, al-Zawahiri denied that al-Qaeda deliberately targeted innocents and accused the American coalition of killing innocent people. Although once associated with al-Qaeda, in 2009, LIFG completed a new "code" for jihad, a 417-page religious document entitled "Corrective Studies". Given its credibility and the fact that several other prominent Jihadists in the Middle East have turned against al-Qaeda, the LIFG's reversal may be an important step toward staunching al-Qaeda's recruitment.

=== Other criticisms ===
Bilal Abdul Kareem, an American journalist based in Syria created a documentary about Al-Shabaab. The documentary included interviews with former members of the group who stated their reasons for leaving Al-Shabaab. The members made accusations of segregation, lack of religious awareness and internal corruption and favoritism. In response to Kareem, the Global Islamic Media Front condemned Kareem, called him a liar, and denied the accusations from the former fighters.

In mid-2014 after the Islamic State of Iraq and the Levant declared that they had restored the Caliphate, an audio statement was released by the then-spokesman of the group Abu Muhammad al-Adnani claiming that "the legality of all emirates, groups, states, and organizations, becomes null by the expansion of the Caliphate's authority." The speech included a religious refutation of al-Qaeda for being too lenient regarding Shi'ites and their refusal to recognize the authority Abu Bakr al-Baghdadi, al-Adnani specifically noting: "It is not suitable for a state to give allegiance to an organization." He also recalled a past instance in which bin Laden called on al-Qaeda members and supporters to give allegiance to Abu Omar al-Baghdadi when the group was still solely operating in Iraq, as the Islamic State of Iraq, and condemned al-Zawahiri for not making this same claim for Abu Bakr al-Baghdadi. Al-Zawahiri was encouraging factionalism and division between former allies of ISIL such as the Al-Nusra Front.

== Flags ==
Flags of al-Qaeda
Variant flag used by al-Qaeda

White variant flag used by al-Qaeda

Seal of the Prophet flag, used from 2007

== Designation as a terrorist group ==
Al-Qaeda is deemed a designated terrorist group by the following countries and international organizations:

- Australia
- Azerbaijan
- Bahrain
- Belarus
- Brazil
- Canada
- China
- European Union
- France
- India
- Indonesia
- Iran
- Ireland
- Israel
- Japan
- Kazakhstan
- Kyrgyzstan
- NATO
- Malaysia
- Netherlands
- New Zealand
- Pakistan
- Philippines
- Russia
- Saudi Arabia
- South Korea
- Sweden
- Switzerland
- Tajikistan
- Turkey designated Al-Qaeda's Turkish branch
- United Arab Emirates
- United Kingdom
- United Nations Security Council
- United States
- Uzbekistan
- Vietnam

== See also ==
- Al-Qaeda involvement in Asia
- Al Qaeda Network Exord
- Allegations of support system in Pakistan for Osama bin Laden
- Belligerents in the Syrian civil war
- Bin Laden Issue Station (former CIA unit for tracking bin Laden)
- Steven Emerson
- International propagation of Salafism and Wahhabism (by region)
- Iran – Alleged Al-Qaeda ties
- Islamic Military Counter Terrorism Coalition
- List of al-Qaeda attacks against Israel
- Operation Cannonball
- Religious terrorism
- Takfir wal-Hijra
- Videos and audio recordings of Osama bin Laden

=== Publications ===
- Al Qaeda Handbook
- Management of Savagery

== Sources ==
=== Bibliography ===
- Mura, Andrea (2015). The Symbolic Scenarios of Islamism: A Study in Islamic Political Thought. London: Routledge.
- Al-Bahri, Nasser (2013). Guarding bin Laden: My Life in Al-Qaeda. London: Thin Man Press. ISBN 978-0-9562473-6-0.
- Atran, Scott (2010). Talking to the Enemy: Faith, Brotherhood, and the (un)making of Terrorists. New York: Ecco Press. ISBN 978-0-06-134490-9.
- Atwan, Abdel Bari (2006). The Secret History of al Qaeda. Berkeley, CA: University of California Press. ISBN 978-0-520-24974-5.
- Atwan, Abdel Bari (2012). After Bin Laden: Al-Qaeda, The Next Generation. London/New York: Saqi Books (London)/ New Press (New York). ISBN 978-0-86356-419-2.
- Basile, Mark (May 2004). "Going to the Source: Why Al Qaeda's Financial Network Is Likely to Withstand the Current War on Terrorist Financing". Studies in Conflict and Terrorism. 27 (3): 169–185. doi:10.1080/10576100490438237. S2CID 109768129.
- Benjamin, Daniel; Simon, Steven (2002). The Age of Sacred Terror (1st ed.). New York: Random House. ISBN 0-375-50859-7.
- Bergen, Peter (2001). Holy War, Inc.: Inside the Secret World of Osama bin Laden (1st ed.). New York: Free Press. ISBN 0-7432-3495-2.
- Bergen, Peter (2006). The Osama bin Laden I Know: An Oral History of al Qaeda's Leader (2nd ed.). New York: Free Press. ISBN 0-7432-7892-5.
- Bergen, Peter; Cruickshank, Paul (June 11, 2008). "The Unraveling: The jihadist revolt against bin Laden". The New Republic. Vol. 238, no. 10. pp. 16–21.
- Bergen, Peter (2011). The Longest War: The Enduring Conflict between America and al-Qaeda. New York: Free Press. ISBN 978-0-7432-7893-5.
- Bin Laden, Osama (2005). Lawrence, Bruce (ed.). Messages to the World: The Statements of Osama bin Laden. London: Verso. ISBN 1-84467-045-7.
- Byman, Daniel (2012). "Breaking the Bonds between Al-Qa'ida and Its Affiliate Organizations" (PDF). Report of the Brookings Institution. Archived (PDF) from the original on August 10, 2022.
- Cassidy, Robert M. (2006). Counterinsurgency and the Global War on Terror: Military Culture and Irregular War. Westport, CT: Praeger Security International. ISBN 0-275-98990-9.
- Coll, Steve (2005). Ghost Wars: The Secret History of the CIA, Afghanistan, and Bin Laden, from the Soviet Invasion to September 10, 2001 (2nd ed.). New York: Penguin Books. ISBN 0-14-303466-9.
- Dalacoura, Katerina (2012). "Transnational Islamist Terrorism: Al Qaeda". Islamist Terrorism and Democracy in the Middle East. Cambridge: Cambridge University Press. pp. 40–65. doi:10.1017/CBO9780511977367.003. ISBN 978-0-511-97736-7. LCCN 2010047275. S2CID 128049972.
- Esposito, John L. (2002). Unholy War: Terror in the Name of Islam. New York: Oxford University Press. ISBN 0-19-515435-5.
- Gallagher, Eugene V.; Willsky-Ciollo, Lydia, eds. (2021). "Al-Qaeda". New Religions: Emerging Faiths and Religious Cultures in the Modern World. Vol. 1. Santa Barbara, California: ABC-CLIO. pp. 13–15. ISBN 978-1-4408-6235-9.
- Gunaratna, Rohan (2002). Inside Al Qaeda (1st ed.). London: C. Hurst & Co. ISBN 1-85065-671-1.
- Hafez, Mohammed M. (March 2007). "Martyrdom Mythology in Iraq: How Jihadists Frame Suicide Terrorism in Videos and Biographies". Terrorism and Political Violence. 19 (1): 95–115. doi:10.1080/09546550601054873. S2CID 145808052.
- Hoffman, Bruce (2002). "The Emergence of the New Terrorism". In Tan, Andrew; Ramakrishna, Kumar (eds.). The New Terrorism: Anatomy, Trends, and Counter-Strategies. Singapore: Eastern Universities Press. pp. 30–49. ISBN 981-210-210-8.
- Jansen, Johannes J.G. (1997). The Dual Nature of Islamic Fundamentalism. Ithaca, NY: Cornell University Press. ISBN 0-8014-3338-X.
- Lahoud, Nelly (2012). "The Merger of Al-Shabab and Qa'idat al-Jihad". CTC Sentinel. 5 (2). Archived from the original on September 10, 2022.
- McGeary, Johanna (February 19, 2001). "A Traitor's Tale". Time. Vol. 157, no. 7. pp. 36–37. Archived from the original on November 21, 2007.
- Napoleoni, Loretta (2003). Modern Jihad: Tracing the Dollars Behind the Terror Networks. London: Pluto Press. ISBN 0-7453-2117-8.
- Qutb, Sayyid (2003). Milestones. Chicago: Kazi Publications. ISBN 0-911119-42-6.
- Rashid, Ahmed (2002) [2000]. Taliban: Militant Islam, Oil and Fundamentalism in Central Asia. New Haven: Yale University Press. ISBN 1-86064-830-4.
- Reeve, Simon (1999). The New Jackals: Ramzi Yousef, Osama Bin Laden and the Future of Terrorism. Boston: Northeastern University Press. ISBN 1-55553-407-4.
- Riedel, Bruce (2008). The Search for al Qaeda: Its Leadership, Ideology, and Future. Washington, D.C.: Brookings Institution Press. ISBN 978-0-8157-7414-3.
- Sageman, Marc (2004). Understanding Terror Networks. Philadelphia: University of Pennsylvania Press. ISBN 0-8122-3808-7.
- Schmid, Alex (2014). "Al Qaeda's "Single Narrative" and Attempts to Develop Counter-Narratives". Terrorism and Counter-Terrorism Studies. doi:10.19165/2014.1.01 (inactive July 11, 2025). ISSN 2468-0664.
- Thomas, Matthew J. (2013). "Exposing and Exploiting Weaknesses in the Merger of al-Qaeda and al-Shabaab". Small Wars & Insurgencies. 24 (3): 413–435. doi:10.1080/09592318.2013.802611. ISSN 0959-2318. S2CID 143419941.
- Trofimov, Yaroslav (2006). Faith at War: A Journey On the Frontlines of Islam, From Baghdad to Timbuktu. New York: Picador. ISBN 978-0-8050-7754-4.
- Wechsler, William F. (2001). "Strangling The Hydra: Targeting Al Qaeda's Finances". In Hoge, James; Rose, Gideon (eds.). How Did This Happen? Terrorism and the New War. New York: PublicAffairs. pp. 129–143. ISBN 1-58648-130-4.
- Wright, Lawrence (2006). The Looming Tower: Al-Qaeda and the Road to 9/11. New York: Knopf. ISBN 0-375-41486-X.
- Wright, Lawrence (June 2, 2008). "The Rebellion Within". The New Yorker. Vol. 84, no. 16. pp. 36–53.

=== Reviews ===
- Akacem, Mohammed (August 2005). "Review: Modern Jihad: Tracing the Dollars behind the Terror Networks". International Journal of Middle East Studies. 37 (3): 444–445. doi:10.1017/S0020743805362143. S2CID 162390565.
- Bale, Jeffrey M. (October 2006). "Deciphering Islamism and Terrorism". Middle East Journal. 60 (4): 777–788.
- Shaffer, R (2015). "The Terrorism, Ideology, and Transformations of Al-Qaeda". Terrorism and Political Violence. 27 (3): 581–590. doi:10.1080/09546553.2015.1055968. S2CID 147008765.

=== Government reports ===
- Kronstadt, K. Allen; Katzman, Kenneth (November 2008). "Islamist Militancy in the Pakistan-Afghanistan Border Region and U.S. Policy" (PDF). US Congressional Research Service. Archived (PDF) from the original on October 9, 2022.
- "Global Al-Qaeda: Affiliates, Objectives, and Future Challenges" (PDF). Subcommittee on Terrorism, Nonproliferation, and Trade of the Committee on Foreign Affairs, House of Representatives. July 18, 2013. Archived from the original on December 2, 2013. Alt URL
- "Progress Report on the Global War on Terrorism". United States Department of State. September 2003. Archived from the original on September 22, 2003.
