= Mohammed Hafez =

Mohammed Hafez or Mohammed Hafeez may refer to:

- Mohammed Hafez (academic) Specialist in islamic movements
- Mohamad Hafez (born 1984), Syrian-American artist and architect
- Mohamed Hafez El-Sayed (born 1963), Egyptian weightlifter
- Mohammed Hafez Ismail (1919 – 1997), Egyptian statesman
