= Al-Qaeda in Bosnia and Herzegovina =

Al-Qaeda branch in Bosnia and Herzegovina

Al-Qaeda in Bosnia and Herzegovina was the al-Qaeda branch based in Bosnia and Herzegovina, formed during the Bosnian War in 1992. During the Bosnian War, the group contributed volunteers to the Bosnian mujahideen (called El Mudžahid), a volunteer detachment of the Army of the Republic of Bosnia and Herzegovina. After the war, the group operated through the Saudi High Commission for Relief of Bosnia and Herzegovina (SHC).

== Origins ==
At the onset of the Bosnian War, the then-president Alija Izetbegović turned to the Muslim world for support in Bosnia's war efforts. This call brought along with it arms, money and an influx of foreign fighters, some of them mujahideen from Afghanistan who had fought against the Soviets. Estimates of the number who came to Bosnia range from 500 to 1,500 foreign fighters, probably around 1,000, many of whom came from Pakistan after their government expelled former fighters of the Afghan resistance. In addition to Afghan resistance fighters, foreign volunteers came from Europe, with Madrid allegedly being a center for recruitment in Europe. Abu Dahdah recruited many fighters out of the Abu Bakr mosque.

It was alleged that between 1993 and 1996, al-Qaeda-leader Osama bin Laden visited camps in the country on a Bosnian passport. According to the German journalist Renate Flottau, bin Laden visited Bosnia and met with Izetbegović in 1993, however Marko Attila Hoare, while not dismissing the possibility out of hand, noted discrepancies between Flottau's claims and Izetbegović's account that he had no recollection of meeting bin Laden. Al-Qaeda, through a Vienna-based charity linked to bin Laden (Third World Relief Agency), funneled millions of dollars in contributions to the Bosnians, trained mujahideen to go and fight in Bosnia, and maintained an office in neighboring Croatia's capital Zagreb.

== Conflict ==
Foreign mujahideen fighters during the Bosnian war served in the El Mudžahid brigade. The experience in Bosnia helped globalize a mujahideen mentality and according to one former al-Qaeda member, many talented leaders of al-Qaeda emerged from this conflict after they developed anti-Western and anti-globalization sentiment.

== Aftermath ==
After the war, al-Qaeda reestablished its connections in Bosnia and Herzegovina through the Saudi High Commission (SHC) charity organization. The charity was formed in 1993 by the decree of King Fahd of Saudi Arabia. It acted as a "fully integrated component of al-Qa[e]da's logistical and financial support infrastructure".

In late 2001, a raid was carried out by United States Special Forces on local SHC headquarters in Ilidža, a suburb of Sarajevo. In the raid documents, including manuals on how to forge the United States Secretary of State office ID cards, as well as manuscripts and notes on meetings with bin Laden were found. Other al-Qaeda fronts such as Vazir (successor of al-Haramain Foundation) and the Global Relief Fund were also shut down.

=== Golden Chain ===
The "Golden Chain" is a list of names that was seized in March 2002 in a raid by Bosnian police of the premises of the Benevolence International Foundation in Sarajevo. The Golden Chain is a list of sponsors of al-Qaeda.

The list included twenty-five names, twenty of them very wealthy Saudis and Gulf States financial sponsors including bankers, businessmen, and former ministers. Part of the list includes a computer file titled "Tarekh Osama" or "Osama History", but the appellation "Golden Chain" itself is due to al Qaeda defector Jamal al-Fadl, who vouched for its authenticity. The computer file contained photographs of the birth and early days of al-Qaeda as well as letters and documents, some in bin Laden's handwriting. In the seized material, records were found of both the plans for al-Qaeda's activities and its organizational structure and operational foundations. These are believed to have been prepared by bin Laden and his mentor Sheikh Abdallah Azzam.

They also found a list of 20 Arab plutocrats, the “Golden Chain”, who were suspected of financing international terrorism, including al-Qaeda. The custody of the secret and confidential material was entrusted to bin Laden's confidant Enaam Arnaout, who was convinced that the documents were in the safest and most secure place in the Sarajevo office of the Benevolence International Foundation. During a search of the Benevolence International Foundation's offices in Sarajevo, the relevant law enforcement agencies found clear evidence of a connection between the head of the office, Enaam Arnaout, and Osama bin Laden, and of “militant” subordination between the two, and charges were brought against Arnaout.
