= Mujahedeen Secrets =

Encryption program for Microsoft Windows

Mujahedeen Secrets (transliterated Arabic: Asrar al-Mujahedeen) is an encryption program for Microsoft Windows. It was publicly offered to supporters of al-Qaeda as a tool to protect the confidentiality of their electronic messages. The authors of the software are anonymous.

== Uses ==
The software allows users to encrypt and decrypt text messages and files with a range of encryption techniques. This is primarily to ensure that any parties intercepting the messages during transmission, such as via Internet e-mail or cellphone, cannot easily view the message's contents.

== Software releases ==
- First release: In 2007, the Global Islamic Media Front, the propaganda arm of Al-Qaeda and other Islamic extremist groups, announced the release of the Mojahedeen Secrets software.
- Second release: In 2008, an updated version, Mojahedeen Secrets 2, was released, offering further encryption methods.
