= Al Qaeda Network Exord =

Al Qaeda Network Exord is a classified order that allows the U.S. military to direct operations against al-Qaeda in 15 to 20 countries around the world, including those not at war with the United States. It was approved by U.S. President George W. Bush and signed by Defense Secretary Donald Rumsfeld in the spring of 2004, and came in response to a desire on the part of the Secretary of Defense to use the military against targets outside of Afghanistan and Iraq; the Central Intelligence Agency (CIA) had been given similar authority in the immediate aftermath of the September 11th attacks.
