= Operation Cannonball =

US Central Intelligence Agency operation

Operation Cannonball is an American Central Intelligence Agency operation disclosed in 2008. Beginning in 2006, it was intended as part of an effort to capture Osama bin Laden and eliminate Al Qaeda forces in Pakistan. There was reportedly "mounting frustration" among Pentagon officials due to the ongoing delay and deployment of special forces units, as originally planned in the Cannonball program. The operation was reportedly hampered by conflicts between CIA offices, leading to large delays in the deployment of the program. Partially to blame for the presently failed deployment of the program was conflict among United States intelligence agencies, along with resources having been diverted to the War in Iraq.

The existence of the covert program, and its various internal conflicts, was revealed to the public by The New York Times on June 30, 2008. The New York Times article was said to be "exposing highly classified Pentagon orders".
