= Attempted assassination of Mohammad Zahir Shah =

1991 stabbing in Rome, Italy

- Location: Rome, Italy
- Date: November 4, 1991; 34 years ago
- Target: Mohammad Zahir Shah
- Weapon: Paper cutter
- Injuries: 1
- Perpetrator: Al-Qaeda
- Motive: Prevent the Najibullah government from restoring the Afghan monarchy

On 4 November 1991, Mohammad Zahir Shah, the former king of Afghanistan, was stabbed and wounded by Paulo Jose de Almeida Santos, a Portuguese convert to Islam posing as a journalist, at his villa in Rome, where he had been living in exile since the 1973 Afghan coup d'état.

== Background ==
In 1973, whilst convalescing from medical treatment in Rome, Zahir Shah was removed from power in a bloodless coup led by his cousin and former Prime Minister, Mohammad Daoud Khan, who abolished the monarchy and established a republic with himself as president. In April 1978, Daoud Khan was deposed and killed in the Saur Revolution, a military coup led by the People's Democratic Party of Afghanistan (PDPA).

In December 1979, the Soviet Union invaded Afghanistan, killing PDPA General Secretary Hafizullah Amin and replacing him with Babrak Karmal, beginning the Soviet–Afghan War. In 1987, Mohammad Najibullah managed to oust Karmal in a power struggle and created a new constitution, restoring the country to its pre-1978 name of "the Republic of Afghanistan" and removing communist ideology as a whole in favour of the free market.

Under Najibullah, Zahir Shah's citizenship was restored and the Najibullah government and the Soviets attempted to involve him in negotiations to end the Afghan Civil War, including a possible restoration of the monarchy. Zahir Shah was considered popular among most Afghans, both rural and urban.

== Attempted assassination ==
To prevent Zahir Shah from coming back from exile and possibly becoming head of a new government, Osama bin Laden, the leader of Al-Qaeda, instructed an Angolan-born Portuguese convert to Islam, Paulo Jose de Almeida Santos, to assassinate the former king. While it was initially suspected that it may have been orchestrated by factions of the mujahideen opposed to the return of Zahir Shah, Santos confirmed Bin Laden's involvement in the assassination attempt in 2002.

On 4 November 1991, Santos entered Zahir Shah's villa in Rome posing as a journalist. After conducting an interview with him, Santos said "Now I must kill you", before stabbing Zahir Shah in his breast-pocket with a sharp-edged paper cutter; the former king's life was saved by a tin of Café Crème cigarillos. Santos then stabbed him in the neck several times, before being overpowered by former General Abdul Wali, a former commander of the Royal Afghan Army and the king's son-in-law. Zahir Shah was rushed to hospital and later recovered, with Santos being sentenced to ten years in a high-security prison in Rebibbia.

== See also ==
- Afghan Civil War (1989–1992)
- National Reconciliation (Afghanistan)
