= Enaam Arnaout =

Syrian American

Enaam M. Arnaout (Kunya: Abu Mahmoud; born 1962) is a Syrian American who pleaded guilty to using charitable donations to support fighters in Bosnia without informing the donors of this, during his tenure as a director of the charity Benevolence International Foundation (which is now banned worldwide by the United Nations).

== Life ==
Arnaout was raised in Hama, Syria. In 1987, Arnaout participated in the Battle of Jaji, and was photographed alongside Osama bin Laden and quoted in the Arab News as saying the Soviet forces had destroyed the trees that the Mujahideen had hoped to use for fortifications.

The government claimed that Enaam Arnaout, aided by Abu Ubaidah al-Banshiri, Mohammed Atef and Yaseen al-Iraqi, purchased AK-47s and mortar rounds from a Pashtun tribesman named Haji Ayoub in about 1990, and that these were subsequently delivered by truck to the Jawr and Jihad Wahl training camps.

== Trial ==
Arnaout entered into a plea agreement on February 10, 2003, in which he pleaded guilty to a single count of racketeering. In that agreement, the prosecution acknowledged that neither Arnaout nor BIF had acted contrary to the interests of the United States, or had any ties to Osama bin Laden or Al Qaeda. Arnaout's statement of guilt acknowledges subverting on the order of $300,000 to $400,000 of charitable funds (out of a total of about $20,000,000) to buy boots, uniforms, tents, and an ambulance for Bosnian fighters, without the knowledge of the charitable donors. Judge Conlon sentenced Arnaout to 136 months in prison.

During a sentencing hearing in August 2003, U.S. District Judge Suzanne Conlon told prosecutors they had "failed to connect the dots" and said there was no evidence that Arnaout "identified with or supported" terrorism.

Both Arnaout and the government appealed to the United States Court of Appeals for the Seventh Circuit. On December 2, 2005, the Seventh Circuit reversed the sentence and remanded the case to Judge Conlon for resentencing. In February 2006, Judge Conlon resentenced Arnaout to 120 months (10 years) in prison.

== Incarceration ==
In 2010, Arnaout and "American Taliban" John Walker Lindh sued to lift restrictions on group prayer by Muslim inmates in the Communication Management Unit at the Federal Correctional Institution at Terre Haute, Indiana. On January 11, 2013, a federal judge ruled in their favor, saying that the government had shown no compelling interest in restricting the religious speech of the inmates by prohibiting them from praying together.

On February 8, 2011, Arnaout was released from prison.
