= Ansar al-Sharia (Mali) =

Radical Islamist group that operates in Mali

- Dates active: 9 December 2012 – present
- Country: Mali
- Allegiance: Movement for Oneness and Jihad in West Africa (2012–2013); Ansar al Sharia
- Ideology: Islamism; Salafi jihadism
- Wars: Islamist insurgency in the Sahel

Ansar al-Sharia (Mali) (Partisans of Islamic Law) is a radical Islamist group that operates in the Azawad region of Mali.

== Background ==
Following the Azawad insurgency in 2012, the northern region of Mali achieved de facto independence from the Mali central government, with the region taken over by a number of Islamist groups including Ansar Dine, Movement for Oneness and Jihad in West Africa and Al-Qaeda in the Islamic Maghreb.

On 9 December 2012, a group of Malian Islamists in the city of Gao announced the creation of a new group called Ansar al-Sharia, a name used by recently founded organizations in a number of Muslim countries including Yemen, Libya and Tunisia.

Most of the group's leaders are from the Arab clans of Berabiches from Timbuktu; some of the families of this tribe reportedly have relations by marriage with elements of Al-Qaeda in the Islamic Maghreb. The ethnic makeup of this group is in contrast to that of the Tuareg-dominated Ansar Dine.

Like the other Ansar al-Sharia groups, the branch in Mali is described as based on certain principles, such as opposition to western-democracy, Salafist Jihadism ideology and the goal of establishing an Islamic emirate. Its formation was not accompanied by the provision of aid and religious preaching that has been typical of other branches of Ansar al-Sharia.

Following the 2013 French intervention in northern Mali, the Jihadist groups formerly running the region switched to fighting an insurgency; however, Ansar al-Sharia has not been credited with participating in any of them.
