= Tanzim Qaedat al-Jihad =

Indonesian paramilitary group

Tanzim Qaedat al-Jihad (Arabic: تنظيم قادة الجهاد, lit. 'Organization for the Basis of Jihad'), also known as Al-Qaeda in the Malay Archipelago, is thought to be a militant splinter group of Southeast Asian Islamist group Jemaah Islamiya. It is thought to have been led by Noordin Mohammad Top.

The group is thought to be inactive since 2024, the year Jemaah Islamiya was disbanded.
