= Benevolence International Foundation =

NGO used as a front for Al Qaeda

- Abbreviation: BIF
- Formation: 1987; 39 years ago
- Defunct: 1994; 32 years ago
- Purpose: Nonprofit used as a front for terrorism

The Benevolence International Foundation (BIF; Benevolence International Fund in Canada), was a purported nonprofit charitable trust based in Saudi Arabia. It was determined to be a front for terrorist group Al-Qaeda and was banned by the United Nations Security Council Committee 1267 and the US Department of the Treasury in November 2002. The BIF's chief executive officer Enaam Arnaout began a ten-year sentence in 2003 after pleading guilty for racketeering in a U.S. federal court.

The nonprofit was founded in 1987 by Adel bin Abdul-Jalil Batterjee of Jeddah, Saudi Arabia. Batterjee was later personally embargoed by the UN from December 2004 until March 2013 and by the US, from December 2004 on. Their website stated that they were a "humanitarian organization helping those afflicted by wars" and providing "short-term relief such as emergency food distribution, long term projects, education and self-sufficiency to the children, widowed, refugees, injured and staff of vital governmental institutions." The BIF had offices in Afghanistan, Azerbaijan, Bangladesh, Bosnia and Herzegovina (Sarajevo and Zenica), Canada, China, Croatia, Georgia (Duisi and Tbilisi), the Netherlands, Pakistan (Islamabad, Peshawar), the Palestinian Territories, Russia (Chechnya, Dagestan, Ingushetia, Moscow), Saudi Arabia (Riyadh and Jeddah), Sudan, Tajikistan, the United Kingdom, the United States and Yemen.

A list of the 20 main financiers of Al-Qaeda, composed by Osama bin Laden in 1988 and dubbed by him the Golden Chain, was found in the Bosnia office of Benevolence International Foundation when it was raided in March 2002.

== History ==
The Islamic Benevolence Committee (Lajnat al-Birr al-Islamiah) was founded in 1987 by Adel bin Abdul-Jalil Batterjee (Arabic: عادل بن عبد الجليل بترجي) of Jeddah Saudi Arabia and had operations in both Jeddah and Peshawar, Pakistan. The group was a "charity" that openly supported fighters against the Soviet invasion of Afghanistan, supplying weapons and funds to the Mujaheddin and facilitating the immigration of foreign volunteer jihadists into that conflict zone.

Another organization, the Benevolence International Corporation, is said to have been started in 1988 by Mohammed Jamal Khalifa of Jeddah, the brother in law of Osama Bin Laden. At the time of founding and operation, it was known as an "import-export" company. It is said that this group was a front for the Abu Sayyaf group.

In 1992 the Benevolence International Corporation (BIC) in the Philippines folded public operations, while the Islamic Benevolence Committee was renamed to the Benevolence International Foundation (BIF). The new entity was incorporated as a tax-exempt nonprofit in Illinois on March 30, 1992, with Enaam Arnaout as its director. Arnaout married an American woman and obtained citizenship in the United States. In 1993 the organization's headquarters moved to Chicago. Meanwhile, the Filipino BIC group would become a group set up to attack U.S. interests in the Philippines. Khalid Sheik Mohammed is said to have led the rest of the group.

On June 15, 1994, US Ambassador Melissa F. Wells visited the BIF headquarters on an envoy from President Bill Clinton, met with Ma'moun Muhammad al-Hasan Bilou, and "praised BIF and its efforts to provide humanitarian relief".

In late 1994, Mohammed Jamal Khalifa travelled to the United States to meet with Mohamed Loay Bayazid, the president of BIC at the time.

== Prosecution ==
Khalifa and Bayazid were arrested in Mountain View, California, in December 1994. The FBI received communications from the Philippines that Khalifa was funding Operation Bojinka, a terrorist plot that was foiled on January 6, 1995. However, Khalifa was deported to Jordan by the INS in May 1995. The Jordanian court acquitted Khalifa and until his death, he lived in Saudi Arabia. Bayazid was also let go.

The U.S. Government alleged that the group sent money and communications to Osama Bin Laden and purchased rockets, mortars, rifles, bayonets, dynamite and other bombs for Al-Qaeda members in Chechnya, Afghanistan, and Pakistan, and redirected funds meant for charity purposes to purposes related to terrorism. The U.S. government also alleged that the group was aiding the travel of terrorists, including Khalifa, Bayazid, and al-Qaeda co-founder Mamdouh Salim. In addition, it was also coordinating the escape of BIF members from Bosnian police.

During a sentencing hearing in August 2003, U.S. District Judge Suzanne Conlon told prosecutors they had "failed to connect the dots" and said there was no evidence that Arnaout "identified with or supported" terrorism.

These allegations were withdrawn as part of a February 2003 plea bargain in which Enaam Arnaout pleaded guilty to racketeering charges. The plea bargain allowed for him to provide information to prosecutors as long as charges that are related to Al-Qaeda are dropped. He publicly denies any link to the group.

A 2011 NPR report claimed that some of the people associated with this group were imprisoned in a highly restrictive Communication Management Unit.
