= Mohamad Hafez =

Syrian-American artist

- محمد حافظ
- Born: Damascus, Syria
- Education: Damascus University Iowa State University
- Website: mohamadhafez.com

Mohamad Hafez (Arabic: محمد حافظ; born 1984) is a Syrian-American artist and architect living in the United States. His work primarily explores around the stories and dislocation of Syrian refugees.

== Early life ==
Hafez was born in 1984 in Syria. He emigrated to the United States in 2003, on a visa to study architecture at the University of Iowa.

== Work ==
Hafez is best known for his miniature diorama works, which depict daily life in Syria, which he has been creating since 2004. His 2017 work Unpacked: Refugee Baggage is a series of miniature dioramas based on interviews that conducted with refugees from the Syrian war. It is intended to humanize the refugee subjects.

In 2021, The New Yorker produced a short film on Hafez's work, directed by Jimmy Goldblum and titled A Broken House. The film later aired on the PBS series POV during the POV Shorts installment "Where I'm From."

== Selected solo exhibitions ==
- 2016 Refugees: Stories of Life's Dreams and Scars - Yale University, New Haven, Connecticut
- 2016 Unsettled Nostalgia - The Harts Gallery, New Milford, Connecticut
- 2016 Desperate Cargo - Real Art Ways, Hartford, Connecticut
- 2016 Sea Garbage - The Athenaeum, St. Johnsbury, Vermont
- 2017 Tomorrow, when Things Have Calmed Down - Hopkins School, New Haven, Connecticut
- 2017 Facades - NHLC, New Haven, Connecticut
- 2017 HOMELAND inSECURITY - Lanoue Gallery, Boston, Massachusetts
- 2017 Critical Refuge - Whitney Humanities Center, Yale University, New Haven, Connecticut
- 2017 UNPACKED: Refugee Baggage - Art Space, New Haven, Connecticut
- 2017 Desperate Cargo - Greenwich Academy, Greenwich, Connecticut
- 2017 UNPACKED: Refugee Baggage - UNICEF House, New York City, New York
- 2018 Damascene Memories - Higgins Gallery, Clark University Worcester, Massachusetts
- 2018 Collateral Damage - Fairfield Art Museum, Walsh Gallery, Fairfield, Connecticut
- 2018 UNPACKED: Refugee Baggage - Christian Petersen Museum, Iowa State University, Ames, Iowa
- 2019 HOMELAND inSECURITY - Cullis Wade Depot Art Gallery, Mississippi State University, Mississippi
- 2019 UNPACKED: Refugee Baggage - The Juilliard School, New York City, New York
- 2019 HOMELAND inSECURITY - Westover School, Middlebury, Connecticut
- 2019 UNPACKED: Refugee Baggage - Harris School of Public Policy, University of Chicago, Illinois
- 2019 UNPACKED: Refugee Baggage - Cullis Wade Depot Art Gallery, Mississippi State University, Mississippi
- 2019 Retrospective - Miossi Gallery at Cuesta College, San Luis Obispo, California

== Selected group exhibitions ==
- 2018 Syria, Then and Now: Stories from Refugees a century apart - Brooklyn Museum, Brooklyn, New York
