= Ansar al-Sharia =

Ansar al-Sharia or Ansar al-Shariah is a name that has been used by a collection of radical or militant Islamist groups or militias in at least eight countries. While they share names and ideology, they lack a unified command structure.

== Current groups ==
- Ansar al-Sharia (Yemen), 2011 – present
- Ansar al-Sharia (Mali), 2012 – present

== Former groups ==
- Ansar al-Sharia (Tunisia), 2011 – 2022
- Ansar al-Sharia (Libya), 2012 – 2017
  - Ansar al-Sharia (Derna, Libya), 2011 – 2018
- Ansar al-Sharia (Egypt), 2012 – 2018
- Ansar al-Sharia (Mauritania), 2013 – 2019
- Ansar al-Sharia (Syria), 2015 – 2017
- Ansarul Sharia Pakistan, 2017 – 2019

== See also ==
- al-Qaeda in the Arabian Peninsula, a militant Islamist organization, primarily active in Yemen and Saudi Arabia
