= Ansar al-Sharia (Mauritania) =

Mauritanian organization

Ansar al-Sharia fi Bilad Shinqit
- أنصار الشريعة في بلاد شنقيط
- Former flag of Ansar al-Sharia fi Bilad Shinqit.
- Leader: Ahmed Salem Ould al-Hassan (2013 - 2019)
- Founded: 11 February 2013
- Dates active: 11 February 2013 – August 2019 (6 years, 6 months and 5 days)
- Dissolved: August 2019
- Country: Mauritania
- Ideology: Salafi Jihadism
- Part of: Ansar al-Sharia

Ansar Al-Sharia fi Bilad Shinqit (Arabic: أنصار الشريعة في بلاد شنقيط, romanized: anṣār aš-šarīʿah fī bilād Šinqīṭ, lit. 'Partisans of Islamic Law in the Land of Chinguetti'), better known as Ansar al-Sharia in Mauritania was a small radical Islamist group that operated in Mauritania.

== Background ==
The Mauritanian Ansar al-Sharia was established by Islamists jailed in the Dar Naïm central prison on 11 February 2013. Ahmed Salem Ould al-Hassan, one of the group's founders, described its purpose as combating secularists, implementing Sharia, and reinstating the position of Islamic scholars within the nation. The group was said to have been influenced by the founding and activities of Ansar al-Sharia (Tunisia).

At the time of its founding, it was joined by some Imams from extremist mosques and a very few Mauritanian Islamist politicians.
