= Mohammed Hafez (academic) =

Mohammed M. Hafez is a specialist in Islamist movements, political militancy, and violent radicalization. He is the author of Why Muslims Rebel and Suicide Bombers in Iraq: The Strategy and Ideology of Martyrdom.

Hafez received his PhD from the London School of Economics and Political Science in 2000. At LSE, he studied under Fred Halliday.

Hafez is currently a professor in the Department of National Security Affairs at the Naval Postgraduate School.

Hafez is also the author of over 50 scholarly articles and policy pieces on militant Islamist ideologies, radicalization, foreign fighters, political violence and suicide bombers.

== Books ==
- Suicide Bombers in Iraq: The Strategy and Ideology of Martyrdom (United States Institute of Peace, 2007)
- Manufacturing Human Bombs: The Making of Palestinian Suicide Bombers (United States Institute of Peace, 2006)
- Why Muslims Rebel: Repression and Resistance in the Islamic World (Lynne Rienner, 2003)
